= 2017–18 Phoenix Suns season =

Professional basketball season

- Head coach: Earl Watson; Jay Triano (interim)
- General manager: Ryan McDonough
- Owners: Robert Sarver
- Arena: Talking Stick Resort Arena

Results
- Record: 21–61 (.256)
- Place: Division: 5th (Pacific); Conference: 15th (Western)
- Playoff finish: Did not qualify
- Stats at Basketball Reference

Local media
- Television: Fox Sports Arizona
- Radio: KTAR

The 2017–18 Phoenix Suns season was the 50th season of the franchise in the National Basketball Association (NBA), as well as their 25th season at the Talking Stick Resort Arena. It was also their third season in five in which the Suns earned a top-five draft pick in the NBA draft, which became the second straight year of gaining the #4 pick in Josh Jackson.

Three games into the season, head coach Earl Watson was fired. Guard Eric Bledsoe implied he wanted out of Phoenix and was barred from playing with the team by general manager Ryan McDonough and fined $10,000. Under interim head coach Jay Triano, the Suns started 4–1 after suspending Bledsoe. The Suns later traded Bledsoe to the Milwaukee Bucks on November 7, 2017, in exchange for center Greg Monroe and two protected draft picks. After dealing with point guard problems and injuries, the Suns traded for Elfrid Payton on February 8, 2018, in exchange for a second-round pick they had previously acquired.

== Key dates ==
- April 17, 2017: Phoenix Suns' general manager Ryan McDonough is confirmed to continue staying as the team's general manager and President of Basketball Operations for at least this season.
- April 18, 2017: Steve Albert announces his retirement from broadcasting.
- May 4, 2017: Sideline reporter Kevin Ray is confirmed to be the new play-by-play broadcaster for the Phoenix Suns starting this season.
- May 16, 2017: The NBA Draft Lottery took place, with the Suns holding the #4 despite having the second-best odds at the #1 pick. Devin Booker and Noah Smith, an 11-year-old Suns fan with microdeletion syndrome and Special Olympics athlete, represented the Suns during the event, while the Original Sun Dick Van Arsdale participated as the team's representative for the lottery pick's official placement.
- June 22, 2017: The 2017 NBA draft took place at the Barclays Center in Brooklyn, New York; the Suns selected small forward Josh Jackson from the University of Kansas with their top pick in the draft, while Phoenix's second-round picks were seniors shooting guard Davon Reed of the University of Miami and combo forward Alec Peters from Valparaiso University at picks 32 and 54, respectively.
- July 1, 2017: The NBA free agency period began.
- July 2, 2017: Phoenix offered a four-year deal worth $24 million to center/power forward Alan Williams, a player that was born and raised in Phoenix; Mike James of the Panathinaikos Athens Superfoods B.C. agrees to being the first two-way contract in franchise history.
- July 3, 2017: The Suns officially provide a two-way contract for two-time summer league invite point guard Mike James, who previously went to Eastern Arizona College before going to Lamar University and then playing in European leagues, with his most recent stop being with the Panathinaikos Athens Superfoods B.C. in Greece; Leandro Barbosa was also waived, receiving $500,000 from the team.
- July 19, 2017: Former Suns player James Jones retired from playing basketball in order to be named the team's Vice President of Basketball Operations; Ryan McDonough was confirmed to a contract extension as the President of Basketball Operations and general manager until at least the 2019–20 season.
- July 20, 2017: Brandon Knight was confirmed to miss the entire season after tearing his ACL.
- July 26, 2017: Alan Williams signed his three-year deal worth $17 million, with his second and third years being non-guaranteed.
- July 30, 2017: The Suns were confirmed to face off against the Brisbane Bullets of the Australian National Basketball League at Talking Stick Resort Arena.
- August 10, 2017: The Phoenix Suns unveiled new home and away jerseys, displayed as both the Association and Icon designs, respectively.
- August 14, 2017: The NBA announces every team's official schedules for the season, as well as the Suns having three nationally televised games on ESPN and one game on TNT.
- August 22, 2017: The Suns sign the Sudan-born shooting guard Peter Jok from the University of Iowa to a partially guaranteed deal.
- August 25, 2017: It was confirmed that rookie shooting guard Davon Reed would miss 4–6 months of playing time due to surgery on his left meniscus; Brandon Knight also had surgery on his torn anterior cruciate ligament that day and missed the entire season.
- September 14, 2017: Tyler Ulis leaked the Suns' retro jersey design from the late 1960s and early 1970s; NBA 2K18 also revealed at least one of the Suns' alternate jerseys for the season.
- September 15, 2017: The Suns unveiled their new alternate jersey design called the "Statement".
- September 21, 2017: Center Alex Len agreed to a one-year qualifying offer worth $4.2 million to remain with the Phoenix Suns.
- September 22, 2017: Former #1 pick in the 2013 NBA draft Anthony Bennett was announced as the team's last training camp candidate for the season; Alan Williams was confirmed to have partially torn his meniscus during practice after accidentally landing on teammate Marquese Chriss; Troy Daniels was acquired as a temporary back-up shooting guard via a trade with the Memphis Grizzlies alongside Memphis' own 2018 middle second-round draft pick from either themselves, the Charlotte Hornets, or the Miami Heat in exchange for giving up a Top-55 protected second-round draft pick; Marquese Chriss unveiled the Hardwood Classics design representing the team's first home jersey for the 50th season in the NBA.
- September 25, 2017: Media Day for the Suns commences with Alex Len officially confirming his one-year deal was signed and T. J. Warren is going to sign a four-year contract extension worth $50 million.
- October 1, 2017: The Suns unveiled the rest of their new NBA uniforms as a part of the NBA's newest deal with Nike.
- October 3, 2017: The NBA announced changes to the 2018 NBA All-Star Game, where two captains pick the starters and reserves for their teams; Phoenix began their preseason with a 114–112 road win against the Portland Trail Blazers.
- October 6, 2017: After a 112–101 preseason loss to the Utah Jazz, it was announced that Suns Ring of Honor and Hall of Famer Connie Hawkins had died.
- October 11, 2017: Before a preseason game against the Portland Trail Blazers began, the Suns waived training camp invitees Peter Jok and Anthony Bennett.
- October 13, 2017: Before the game against Australia's Brisbane Bullets commenced, the Suns signed a French power forward Tidjan Keita. The Suns defeated the Brisbane Bullets by a score of 114–93.
- October 14, 2017: The Suns announced their final roster to enter the regular season, with both the recently signed Tidjan Keita and the partially guaranteed Elijah Millsap being cut alongside the previously cut Peter Jok and Anthony Bennett.
- October 18, 2017: The regular season began against the Portland Trail Blazers wearing their retro uniforms; throughout the rest of the season, the Suns wore a black "Hawk" patch on their jerseys to commemorate the memory of Connie Hawkins.
- October 20, 2017: Before beginning the second game of the season against the Los Angeles Lakers, the Suns held a memorial service for the Connie Hawkins outside the stadium.
- October 22, 2017: After point guard Eric Bledsoe announced he wanted out of Phoenix, the Suns fired head coach Earl Watson after the third game of the season; Jay Triano, the former associate head coach of the team, became the interim head coach for the rest of the season; Nate Bjorkgren, Mehmet Okur, and Jason Fraser were also fired from the coaching staff.
- October 23, 2017: Phoenix won their first game with a 117–115 win over the Sacramento Kings.
- October 24, 2017: The Phoenix Suns hired Northern Arizona Suns head coach Tyrone Ellis, as well as assistant coaches Bret Burchard and Brandon Rosenthal, to take over the vacant assistant coaching spots; Josh Jackson was fined $35,000 for a menacing hand gesture against the fans of the Los Angeles Clippers during Earl Watson's last game as head coach for the Suns on October 21.
- November 7, 2017: The Suns traded disgruntled point guard Eric Bledsoe to the Milwaukee Bucks in exchange for center Greg Monroe and protected future 1st and 2nd-round picks.
- November 23, 2017: The NBA fully revealed their penultimate jerseys of the season, the "Statement" jersey. The "Statement" jersey for Phoenix involved a mixture of the 1990s black alternate jersey and the 2000s "PHX" alternate jersey.
- December 6, 2017: Shooting guard Devin Booker strained his adductor in the game the previous day and was announced for two to three weeks.
- December 7, 2017: The Suns signed point guard Mike James from his two-way contract to an extended contract for the rest of the season while waiving small forward Derrick Jones Jr.
- December 8, 2017: Phoenix signed Danuel House to fill their remaining two-way contract.
- December 13, 2017: Isaiah Canaan signed with the team under the team's disabled player exception following the injuries to Brandon Knight, Davon Reed, Alan Williams, and Devin Booker.
- December 14, 2017: NBA 2K18 leaked the entire NBA's final jerseys of the season, named the "City" jerseys. In Phoenix's case, their jerseys used the "Los Suns" moniker from previous seasons, but the color of the jersey became purple instead of orange as in previous seasons with the Los Suns name.
- December 22, 2017: The Suns waived former two-way contracted point guard Mike James from the team before Devin Booker returned from his injury.
- December 23, 2017: Isaiah Canaan's contract was converted to a full, one-year, veteran's minimum contract.
- December 26, 2017: Devin Booker returned from injury and recorded 32 points, 6 assists, and 5 rebounds in a 99–97 win over the Memphis Grizzlies.
- December 27, 2017: The "City" jersey was revealed via Nike's website.
- January 31, 2018: Isaiah Canaan fractured his left ankle.
- February 1, 2018: Center Greg Monroe was waived; Josh Gray of the Northern Arizona Suns signed a 10-day contract with the Phoenix Suns to replace Isaiah Canaan.
- February 8, 2018: On the trade deadline, the Suns traded the second-round pick they had previously acquired from the Troy Daniels deal to the Orlando Magic in exchange for Elfrid Payton; Isaiah Canaan was waived.
- February 11, 2018: Josh Gray signed his second 10-day contract with the team.
- February 16, 2018: The 2018 NBA All-Star Weekend in Los Angeles begins.
- February 17, 2018: Devin Booker won the three-point contest recording a record-high 28 points in the final round.
- February 20, 2018: Shaquille Harrison of the Northern Arizona Suns signs a 10-day contract, replacing Josh Gray.
- March 13, 2018: Shaquille Harrison signed a multi-year deal with the Phoenix Suns.
- March 26, 2018: Center Alan Williams made his debut following his injury.
- March 31, 2018: Five former Phoenix Suns members – Charlie Scott, Jason Kidd, Steve Nash, Rick Welts, and Grant Hill were named members of the Naismith Basketball Hall of Fame.
- April 6, 2018: Devin Booker was confirmed as one of 35 potential players for the Team USA Basketball squad for the 2018–2020 (later 2021) period, being the Suns first player since both Amar'e Stoudemire and Shawn Marion in 2004 to get invited.
- May 22, 2018: The NBA announces the members of the All-NBA Rookie Team, with Josh Jackson making the All-NBA Second Rookie Team.

== Offseason ==
=== Draft picks ===
| Round | Pick | Player | Position(s) | Nationality | College |
|---|---|---|---|---|---|
| 1 | 4 | Josh Jackson | Small Forward | United States | Kansas |
| 2 | 32 | Davon Reed | Shooting Guard | United States | Miami (FL) |
| 2 | 54 | Alec Peters | Power Forward | United States | Valparaiso |

The Phoenix Suns entered the draft with only one first-round pick and two second-round picks this season. Their first-round pick was their second straight pick at #4, despite having the second-best odds at the #1 pick that year. That draft later resulted in the Top 4 selections having the same teams representing the top of the draft similar to the previous year's draft. Meanwhile, their first second-round pick was given to them for having the second-worst record of the season last season despite having a better record than their previous season. Their own second-round pick was also used in a trade with the Atlanta Hawks during the 2017 trade deadline in exchange for the rights to Mike Scott, the draft rights to Turkish shooting guard/small forward Cenk Akyol, and some cash considerations worth $500,000, although it wasn't conveyed to Atlanta due to their second-round pick(s) remaining in the top 55 of this year's draft. Finally, their second (and final) second-round pick was given to them by the Toronto Raptors for trading defensive small forward P. J. Tucker to them that same day in exchange for their second-round picks in 2017 & 2018, as well as the rights to Jared Sullinger and cash considerations worth $1,000,000. The Raptors' second-round pick won the tiebreaker over both the Cleveland Cavaliers and the Los Angeles Clippers (who originally held Picks 55 & 56 respectively that draft), but ultimately lost out to the Boston Celtics for pick 53 that year. Speaking of which, the Suns were also initially planned to get the Minnesota Timberwolves' second round selection for this year, but traded it away in a different trade with the Boston Celtics (back when it was still considered to be a first-round draft pick) in order to get Brandan Wright on the team under the same season they first acquired Isaiah Thomas. In addition to that, the Los Angeles Lakers' first-round pick that had belonged to the Suns before the 2014–15 season came and went was originally perceived to be conveyed to the Philadelphia 76ers this year, but the Lakers still wound up with pick #2 again to keep their pick for this season; that 2018 pick could later be potentially given to the Boston Celtics in order for them to trade away their #1 pick this year to Philadelphia.

With the fourth pick in the 2017 NBA Draft, the Suns selected freshman small forward Josh Jackson from the University of Kansas. During his only season with Kansas, Jackson showcased his talent. In the 35 games Josh played with the Jayhawks, he recorded averages of 16.3 points, 7.4 rebounds, 3.0 assists, 1.7 steals, and 1.1 blocks per game while also earning the Big 12 Conference's Freshman of the Year Award, First Team All-Big 12 honors, and mixed honors with the NCAA Men's Basketball All-Americans; more specifically, he'd get Second Team honors from the Sporting News, while he had Third Team honors from the Associated Press and the National Association of Basketball Coaches. Meanwhile, with the Suns' first second-round pick, they selected senior shooting guard Davon Reed from the University of Miami. Throughout his career in Miami, Florida, Reed managed to provide career averages of 10.3 points and 3.6 rebounds per game, but managed his best work as a senior with 14.9 points and 4.8 rebounds per game. Davon's considered handiwork, however, comes on the defensive end, as he managed to earn All-ACC Defensive Team honors in 2017 alongside being a member of the All-ACC Third Team and holding great academics throughout his college career. Finally, with the last second-round pick, Phoenix selected power forward Alec Peters from Valparaiso University. Under Alec's last season at Valparaiso, he became one of only two players to record over 20 points and 10 rebounds per game in the NCAA's Division I with 23.0 points and 10.1 rebounds per game recorded for them in his senior year (with the other player being senior power forward/center Tim Kempton Jr., son of former Suns player Tim Kempton Sr., from Lehigh University). As a result, Peters was named the Horizon League Men's Basketball Player of the Year in 2017. He also was named the Horizon League Tournament's MVP in 2015, an Academics All-American First Team member in 2017, became a three-time member of the All-Horizon League First Team from 2015 to 2017, and was even twice mentioned as an honorable mention for the Associated Press' All-American Teams. Like first-round pick Josh Jackson, Alec Peters was also named a member of the National Association of Basketball Coaches' All-American Third Team in 2017 himself. Peters was originally projected to be a late-first-round pick before his right leg injury near the end of his senior season led to his draft stock slipping to the late second round; he also became the team's second two-way contract of the season on September 18 (first contract being Mike James), meaning he'd split his playing time between the Phoenix Suns and their NBA G League affiliate, the Northern Arizona Suns, for the vast majority of the season.

=== Free agency ===
This season, the only player on the Suns set to become an unrestricted free agent as of the end of the 2016–17 NBA season was the twice-returned Ronnie Price. However, for restricted free agents, both centers Alex Len and Alan Williams were given qualifying offers on June 27, 2017, and could have opportunities to remain with the team if the Suns wanted to keep both of them. T. J. Warren also stayed for a longer period of time, signing a four-year deal worth $50 million on September 25, 2017. In addition, veteran guard Leandro Barbosa and small forwards Derrick Jones Jr. and Elijah Millsap, all have team options for another season, with the latter two having them near the mid-season deadline on January 7, 2018, although neither player got to that point in time. Alan Williams also qualified for the NBA's Early Bird rights due to previously debuting late in the 2015–16 NBA season and essentially signing a two-year deal around that time. This season also marks the first season where NBA teams get to add 16 or even 17 players to their official roster using two-way contracts, which allows NBA teams to add players with less than three full years of NBA experience to enter the league with the condition of staying on their NBA G League team for the majority of the season for higher salaries than they could otherwise get in the recently rebranded league.

Summer League invite Mike James, a point guard who previously went to Eastern Arizona College and a Greek Basket League star with the Panathinaikos Superfoods, announced prior to free agency that he would try to earn a two-way contract. On July 2, the Suns gave Alan Williams a four-year deal worth around $24 million to stay with his hometown team. A day later, the Suns renounced their rights to Leandro Barbosa making him a free agent in the process. Mike James also officially signed a deal with the Suns the same day they announced their team for the 2017 NBA Summer League. After originally being offered a four-year deal worth $24 million from the Suns, Williams officially received a three-year partially guaranteed deal worth $17 million on July 9 and signed it on July 26. A day before Williams signed with the Suns, however, it was reported that Brandon Knight tore his ACL during a pickup game in Florida. With the announcement of Knight's ACL injury causing him to be out for most of the season, the Suns qualified to have an additional $6.8 million to spend as a disabled player exception, likely extending their roster to 18 players at some point this season. The roster potentially required that extra player again on August 25 with the announcement of rookie shooting guard Davon Reed being out for four to six months due to surgery on his left meniscus and then on September 22 with center/power forward Alan Williams being out for a currently undetermined time with a partially torn meniscus of his own. A day before his teammate got injured, though, the Suns signed their other center, Alex Len, to a one-year qualifying offer worth $4.2 million to remain on their squad. On November 11, 2017, it was announced that Leandro Barbosa would return to his native land of Brazil for a second time, this time being a part of the Franca Basquetebol Clube. Ronnie Price ultimately was the only player from last season's roster to not play at all entering this season.

On August 22, 2017, the Suns signed former Iowa University shooting guard Peter Jok to a partially guaranteed deal to prove his worth in training camp. On September 11, it was originally announced that the Suns signed shooting guard and former first-round draft pick R. J. Hunter as a possible temporary replacement for injured rookie Davon Reed. It was later reported from The Arizona Republic on that same day that Hunter alongside shooting guards Isaiah Canaan, Andre Dawkins, and Northern Arizona Suns' player Xavier Silas had all come to Phoenix for workouts, but none of them received a training camp offer with the Suns. On September 22, after Len's agreement was announced, former 2013 NBA draft number-one pick Anthony Bennett was confirmed as a partially guaranteed training camp deal player alongside Peter Jok. Furthermore, that same day also led to them gaining Troy Daniels from a trade to help shore up the shooting guard spot. Furthermore, on the same day Alex Len officially signed his qualifying offer (and Alan Williams had successful surgery on his meniscus), it was confirmed that T. J. Warren signed a four-year contract extension with the Suns worth $50 million. On October 11, the Suns cut Peter Jok and Anthony Bennett before their final preseason game against the Portland Trail Blazers began. Two days later, before their actual last preseason game began against the Brisbane Bullets from Australia, the Suns signed a French power forward from Canada named Tidjan Keita. All of these players were part of the Northern Arizona Suns G League squad instead, with both Keita and Elijah Millsap being cut a day later (Millsap was later traded to the Iowa Wolves after being cut by Phoenix via the Northern Arizona squad for the #1 pick in the 2017 NBA G League Draft).

On December 7, 2017, after point guard Mike James finished the last day of his original two-way contract with Phoenix, he'd be retained by them with a full-blown contract, albeit at the price of being forced to waive small forward Derrick Jones Jr. earlier than expected. On the same day, after a loss to the Washington Wizards, the Suns signed Danuel House to a two-way contract, filling up the spot originally held for Mike James earlier in the year. However, Phoenix used their disabled player's injury exception to sign recent Northern Arizona Suns and former Houston Rockets combo guard Isaiah Canaan on December 13, 2017, with the tipping point involving star shooting guard Devin Booker being out for a few weeks. Isaiah was previously acquired by the Northern Arizona Suns trading their 2018 first-round pick to the Agua Caliente Clippers expansion squad for him. Canaan stayed with Phoenix even after Devin Booker returned from his injury by converting his deal into a standard one year, veteran's minimum contract, while the Suns waived former two-way contracted point guard Mike James from the team on December 22, 2017. However, after Canaan fractured his tibia on the same day they officially waived center Greg Monroe from the team (January 31), the Suns signed Northern Arizona Suns point guard Josh Gray to a 10-day contract a day later. In the aftermath of the February 8, 2018 NBA trade deadline, the Suns were forced to waive Isaiah Canaan (with him still receiving his full salary for the year) in order to gain Elfrid Payton in their trade with the Orlando Magic in exchange for a second-round pick from Memphis. However, Canaan still got paid the full salary for the season and use the team's facilities to help his body recover from his season-ending injury. Meanwhile, Josh Gray signed his second 10-day contract with Phoenix on February 11, although he was waived on February 21 (with his contract expiring that day) with fellow Northern Arizona Suns player Shaquille Harrison signing his own 10-day contract that day. Harrison signed his second 10-day contract on March 3 before signing a multi-year contract with Phoenix on March 13.

==== Trades ====
On September 22, 2017, the same day they had former #1 pick Anthony Bennett join their training camp roster, the Suns traded their own top-55 protected second-round pick to the Memphis Grizzlies (which wasn't be conveyed to Memphis) in exchange for shooting guard Troy Daniels and a second-round pick of their own, which was the middle choice between the Charlotte Hornets, Memphis, and the Miami Heat (which ultimately became Charlotte's second-round pick). A month later, before the Suns fired head coach Earl Watson, star point guard Eric Bledsoe released a Tweet on Twitter saying he didn't want to be with the team. As a result of that tweet, he was sent home for the disruption. Teams that had talked with the Suns for their disgruntled star point guard included the Denver Nuggets, Milwaukee Bucks, New York Knicks, and Cleveland Cavaliers. While waiting for a potential trade, they eventually let Bledsoe return for practices with the squad, but didn't allow him to play in games. Ultimately, a trade with the Milwaukee Bucks was made November 7, 2017. In that deal, the Suns received center Greg Monroe (who was on an expiring contract), a protected first-round pick that'd be conveyed in 2018 (if it was at picks #11–16; 2019 if it's at picks #4–18; 2020 if it's at picks #8–30; or 2021 as a fully unprotected pick), and a second-round pick that was conveyed to Phoenix if it was at picks #48–60 or be conveyed to the Brooklyn Nets later on by the end of the season; and Greg Monroe was waived by having his contract be bought out on January 31, 2018. Finally, on the February 8, 2018 trade deadline, the Suns traded the Charlotte Hornets' second-round pick they previously acquired from the Troy Daniels deal in exchange for point guard Elfrid Payton from the Orlando Magic for at least the rest of the season.

=== Front office changes ===
While general manager Ryan McDonough was originally confirmed to remain as the team's general manager and President of Basketball Operations on April 19, 2017, for at least one more season, he was given a contract extension to remain for both roles throughout the end of the decade on July 19, 2017. While McDonough never led the team to the playoffs throughout his original tenure (having a winning season only in his first year as general manager and being named the runner-up for the NBA Executive of the Year that year), what won him over was the youth movement that he arranged. Furthermore, on that same day, it was announced that former Suns player and three-time NBA Finals champion small forward/shooting guard James Jones was the new Vice President of Basketball Operations, to oversee basketball matters for the team like upcoming draft picks, trades, and free agency moves.

=== Coaching changes ===
On October 22, 2017, after having two of some of the worst losses in franchise history to start the season, the Suns fired head coach Earl Watson. That same day, the Suns hired Canadian associate head coach Jay Triano to be interim head coach for the rest of the season. Later on that day, the Suns also fired assistant coaches Nate Bjorkgren, Mehmet Okur, and Jason Fraser. A day later, it was announced that the head coach of the Northern Arizona Suns affiliate team, Tyrone Ellis, was named as one of the new assistant coaches, with Marlon Garnett also being promoted as a full-time assistant coach that same day. However, Tyrone wasn't officially called over until October 24, 2017, alongside Northern Arizona Suns assistant coaches Bret Burchard and Brandon Rosenthal taking over some of the vacant coaching spots for the Phoenix Suns (with Tyler Gatlin being left to take over as the head coach for the G League squad for the preseason before returning as assistant (and later associate) coach for Cody Toppert's new coaching staff for Northern Arizona's regular season). For Northern Arizona, they found their newest assistant coaches to join Tyler Gatlin on November 20 with Nick Friedman and two-time former Phoenix Suns (and one-time Bakersfield Jam player back when the Northern Arizona squad was called that) center Earl Barron joining that newly completed coaching staff for the season. During the season, Phoenix also looked to target potential new coaching candidates, including former Memphis Grizzlies head coach David Fizdale, former Suns and current (at the time) Utah Jazz assistant coach Igor Kokoškov, and Villanova University head coach Jay Wright around the conclusion of the season. In fact, on March 23, 2018, it was confirmed by general manager Ryan McDonough that the team has begun their coaching search earlier than anticipated.

== Roster ==
2017–18 Phoenix Suns roster
Players

| Pos. | No. | Player | Height | Weight | DOB | From |
|---|---|---|---|---|---|---|
| F | 35 | Dragan Bender | 7 ft 1 in (2.16 m) | 225 lb (102 kg) | 1997–11–17 | Croatia |
| G | 1 | Devin Booker | 6 ft 6 in (1.98 m) | 210 lb (95 kg) | 1996–10–30 | Kentucky |
| C | 4 | Tyson Chandler | 7 ft 1 in (2.16 m) | 240 lb (109 kg) | 1982–10–02 | Manuel Dominguez HS (CA) |
| F | 0 | Marquese Chriss | 6 ft 10 in (2.08 m) | 240 lb (109 kg) | 1997–07–02 | Washington |
| G | 30 | Troy Daniels | 6 ft 4 in (1.93 m) | 205 lb (93 kg) | 1991–07–15 | VCU |
| F | 3 | Jared Dudley | 6 ft 7 in (2.01 m) | 240 lb (109 kg) | 1985–07–10 | Boston College |
| G | 10 | Shaquille Harrison (R) | 6 ft 4 in (1.93 m) | 190 lb (86 kg) | 1993–10–06 | Tulsa |
| G/F | 23 | Danuel House (TW) | 6 ft 7 in (2.01 m) | 220 lb (100 kg) | 1993–06–07 | Texas A&M |
| F | 20 | Josh Jackson (R) | 6 ft 8 in (2.03 m) | 200 lb (91 kg) | 1997–02–10 | Kansas |
| G | 11 | Brandon Knight | 6 ft 3 in (1.91 m) | 195 lb (88 kg) | 1991–12–02 | Kentucky |
| C | 21 | Alex Len | 7 ft 1 in (2.16 m) | 250 lb (113 kg) | 1993–06–16 | Maryland |
| G | 2 | Elfrid Payton | 6 ft 4 in (1.93 m) | 185 lb (84 kg) | 1994–02–22 | Louisiana |
| F | 25 | Alec Peters (R/TW) | 6 ft 9 in (2.06 m) | 235 lb (107 kg) | 1995–04–13 | Valparaiso |
| G | 32 | Davon Reed (R) | 6 ft 6 in (1.98 m) | 210 lb (95 kg) | 1995–06–11 | Miami (FL) |
| G | 8 | Tyler Ulis | 5 ft 10 in (1.78 m) | 160 lb (73 kg) | 1996–01–05 | Kentucky |
| F | 12 | T. J. Warren | 6 ft 8 in (2.03 m) | 215 lb (98 kg) | 1993–09–05 | NC State |
| F/C | 15 | Alan Williams | 6 ft 8 in (2.03 m) | 265 lb (120 kg) | 1993–01–28 | UC Santa Barbara |

Coaches
Head coach
- Jay Triano (interim)
Assistant(s)
- Tyrone Corbin
- Marlon Garnett
- Tyrone Ellis (player development)
- Scott Duncan (player development)
- Bret Burchard (player development)
- Brandon Rosenthal (player development)

Legend
- (DP) Unsigned draft pick
- (FA) Free agent
- (S) Suspended
- (R) Rookie
- (GL) On assignment to G League affiliate
- (TW) Two-way affiliate player
- Injured

Roster

=== Salaries ===
| Player | 2017–18 Salary |
|---|---|
| Brandon Knight | $13,618,750 |
| Tyson Chandler | $13,000,000 |
| Jared Dudley | $10,000,000 |
| Alan Williams | $6,000,000 |
| Josh Jackson | $5,090,040 |
| Dragan Bender | $4,468,800 |
| Oleksiy "Alex" Len | $4,200,000 |
| Troy Daniels | $3,408,520 |
| Elfrid Payton | $3,332,340 |
| T. J. Warren | $3,152,930 |
| Marquese Chriss | $3,073,800 |
| Devin Booker | $2,319,360 |
| Tyler Ulis | $1,312,611 |
| Davon Reed | $815,615 |
| Shaquille Harrison | $230,399 |
| Alec Peters | $75,000 |
| Danuel House Jr. | $75,000 |
| Total | $89,413,909 |

This season was the first season since the 2011–12 season where the Suns no longer paid for the contract they gave to Michael Beasley, since they paid the total amount needed to remove him on their roster on September 3, 2013. However, after waiving Leandro Barbosa, the Suns still owed him about $500,000 of guaranteed money. Similarly, because the Suns waived both Derrick Jones Jr. and Mike James earlier than anticipated, they'd only receive $385,625 and around $250,000 of guaranteed money this season respectively. The Suns also bought out Greg Monroe's contract for the year, which cost $17,884,176 for this season only (with Phoenix receiving $1,500,000 back after Greg signed his new deal with the Boston Celtics), as well as give Isaiah Canaan his full salary of $1,069,308 after he was waived. Furthermore, because of the sliding scale, the newly implemented two-way contracts, earning as little as $75,000 and about as much as $279,000 in a season, depending on where they play under a majority of their time, players like Mike James at the time, late second round rookie Alec Peters, and Danuel House did not affect their salary cap, regardless of how much they get paid for throughout the season.

== Pre-season ==
This pre-season marked the first pre-season where the number of games was intentionally shortened for the purpose of better quality control as the season continued onward, going from the usual 7–8 games to 5 games. It was also announced on July 31 that the Suns would play a preseason game against the Brisbane Bullets from the NBL in Australia on October 13 at the Talking Stick Resort Arena. Their official preseason schedule was announced a day later, with the only other NBA teams the Suns being the Portland Trail Blazers and Utah Jazz both on the road and at home. While the Suns started and closed the preseason out strongly, they had a tough time in the middle of it, ending the preseason with a 2–3 record.

2017 pre-season game log
Total: 2–3 (Home: 1–2; Road: 1–1)
Pre-season: 2–3 (home: 1–2; road: 1–1)

| Game | Date | Team | Score | High points | High rebounds | High assists | Location Attendance | Record |
|---|---|---|---|---|---|---|---|---|
| 1 | October 3 | @ Portland | W 114–112 | T. J. Warren (24) | Alex Len (13) | Devin Booker (5) | Moda Center; 15,507 | 1–0 |
| 2 | October 6 | @ Utah | L 101–112 | Alex Len, Troy Daniels (18) | Alex Len (9) | Tyler Ulis (6) | Vivint Smart Home Arena; 17,196 | 1–1 |
| 3 | October 9 | Utah | L 102–120 | Devin Booker (19) | Alex Len (6) | Eric Bledsoe (7) | Talking Stick Resort Arena; 7,643 | 1–2 |
| 4 | October 11 | Portland | L 104–113 | Josh Jackson (22) | Marquese Chriss (12) | Eric Bledsoe (6) | Talking Stick Resort Arena; 13,230 | 1–3 |
| 5 | October 13 | Brisbane | W 114–93 | Devin Booker (31) | Dragan Bender, Tyson Chandler (9) | Devin Booker (6) | Talking Stick Resort Arena; 8,297 | 2–3 |

2017–18 season schedule

== Regular season ==
According to a Twitter leak on the Los Angeles Clippers' home schedule, it revealed that the Phoenix Suns would play the Clippers at the Staples Center on October 21 and December 20, 2017; the former date being the first game the Clippers will play on their home court. Phoenix's full schedule was released on August 14, 2017.

=== Standings ===
| Pacific Division | W | L | PCT | GB | Home | Road | Div | GP |
|---|---|---|---|---|---|---|---|---|
| y – Golden State Warriors | 58 | 24 | .707 | – | 29‍–‍12 | 29‍–‍12 | 13–3 | 82 |
| Los Angeles Clippers | 42 | 40 | .512 | 16.0 | 22‍–‍19 | 20‍–‍21 | 12–4 | 82 |
| Los Angeles Lakers | 35 | 47 | .427 | 23.0 | 20‍–‍21 | 15‍–‍26 | 6–10 | 82 |
| Sacramento Kings | 27 | 55 | .329 | 31.0 | 14‍–‍27 | 13‍–‍28 | 5–11 | 82 |
| Phoenix Suns | 21 | 61 | .256 | 37.0 | 10‍–‍31 | 11‍–‍30 | 4–12 | 82 |

Western Conference
| # | Team | W | L | PCT | GB | GP |
|---|---|---|---|---|---|---|
| 1 | z – Houston Rockets * | 65 | 17 | .793 | – | 82 |
| 2 | y – Golden State Warriors * | 58 | 24 | .707 | 7.0 | 82 |
| 3 | y – Portland Trail Blazers * | 49 | 33 | .598 | 16.0 | 82 |
| 4 | x – Oklahoma City Thunder | 48 | 34 | .585 | 17.0 | 82 |
| 5 | x – Utah Jazz | 48 | 34 | .585 | 17.0 | 82 |
| 6 | x – New Orleans Pelicans | 48 | 34 | .585 | 17.0 | 82 |
| 7 | x – San Antonio Spurs | 47 | 35 | .573 | 18.0 | 82 |
| 8 | x – Minnesota Timberwolves | 47 | 35 | .573 | 18.0 | 82 |
| 9 | Denver Nuggets | 46 | 36 | .561 | 19.0 | 82 |
| 10 | Los Angeles Clippers | 42 | 40 | .512 | 23.0 | 82 |
| 11 | Los Angeles Lakers | 35 | 47 | .427 | 30.0 | 82 |
| 12 | Sacramento Kings | 27 | 55 | .329 | 38.0 | 82 |
| 13 | Dallas Mavericks | 24 | 58 | .293 | 41.0 | 82 |
| 14 | Memphis Grizzlies | 22 | 60 | .268 | 43.0 | 82 |
| 15 | Phoenix Suns | 21 | 61 | .256 | 44.0 | 82 |

=== Game log ===
2017–18 game log
Total: 21–61 (Home: 10–31; Road: 11–30)
October: 3–4 (home: 2–2; road: 1–2)

| Game | Date | Team | Score | High points | High rebounds | High assists | Location Attendance | Record |
|---|---|---|---|---|---|---|---|---|
| 1 | October 18 | Portland | L 76–124 | Eric Bledsoe (15) | Dragan Bender (7) | Eric Bledsoe (3) | Talking Stick Resort Arena; 18,055 | 0–1 |
| 2 | October 20 | L.A. Lakers | L 130–132 | Eric Bledsoe (28) | Devin Booker (11) | Devin Booker (8) | Talking Stick Resort Arena; 18,055 | 0–2 |
| 3 | October 21 | @ L.A. Clippers | L 88–130 | Alex Len (15) | Tyson Chandler (14) | Mike James (6) | Staples Center; 19,068 | 0–3 |
| 4 | October 23 | Sacramento | W 117–115 | Devin Booker (22) | Tyson Chandler (14) | Mike James (7) | Talking Stick Resort Arena; 14,903 | 1–3 |
| 5 | October 25 | Utah | W 97–88 | T. J. Warren (27) | Alex Len (13) | Tyler Ulis (5) | Talking Stick Resort Arena; 16,022 | 2–3 |
| 6 | October 28 | @ Portland | L 107–114 | Devin Booker (34) | Alex Len (8) | Devin Booker (6) | Moda Center; 19,343 | 2–4 |
| 7 | October 31 | @ Brooklyn | W 122–114 | Devin Booker (30) | Alex Len (15) | Mike James (5) | Barclays Center; 12,936 | 3–4 |

November : 5–11 (home: 2–7; road: 3–4)

| Game | Date | Team | Score | High points | High rebounds | High assists | Location Attendance | Record |
|---|---|---|---|---|---|---|---|---|
| 8 | November 1 | @ Washington | W 122–116 | T. J. Warren (40) | Marquese Chriss, T. J. Warren (10) | Mike James (6) | Capital One Arena; 14,790 | 4–4 |
| 9 | November 3 | @ New York | L 107–120 | Devin Booker (34) | Tyson Chandler (10) | Mike James (8) | Madison Square Garden; 19,404 | 4–5 |
| 10 | November 5 | @ San Antonio | L 95–112 | T. J. Warren (17) | Tyson Chandler (14) | Tyler Ulis (7) | AT&T Center; 18,038 | 4–6 |
| 11 | November 6 | Brooklyn | L 92–98 | T. J. Warren (20) | Alex Len (14) | Tyler Ulis (3) | Talking Stick Resort Arena; 15,905 | 4–7 |
| 12 | November 8 | Miami | L 115–126 | Devin Booker (30) | Marquese Chriss (9) | Devin Booker (6) | Talking Stick Resort Arena; 16,500 | 4–8 |
| 13 | November 10 | Orlando | L 112–128 | Alex Len (21) | Alex Len (13) | Devin Booker (5) | Talking Stick Resort Arena; 16,507 | 4–9 |
| 14 | November 11 | Minnesota | W 118–110 | Devin Booker, T. J. Warren (35) | Devin Booker (9) | Devin Booker (6) | Talking Stick Resort Arena; 16,910 | 5–9 |
| 15 | November 13 | L.A. Lakers | L 93–100 | Devin Booker (36) | Tyson Chandler (15) | Devin Booker, T. J. Warren (3) | Talking Stick Resort Arena; 17,533 | 5–10 |
| 16 | November 16 | Houston | L 116–142 | Troy Daniels (23) | Alex Len (13) | Devin Booker (10) | Talking Stick Resort Arena; 16,875 | 5–11 |
| 17 | November 17 | @ L.A. Lakers | W 122–113 | Devin Booker (33) | Alex Len (18) | Mike James (8) | Staples Center; 18,997 | 6–11 |
| 18 | November 19 | Chicago | W 113–105 | T. J. Warren (27) | Alex Len (8) | Devin Booker (6) | Talking Stick Resort Arena; 16,264 | 7–11 |
| 19 | November 22 | Milwaukee | L 107–113 (OT) | Devin Booker (23) | Tyson Chandler (12) | Devin Booker (4) | Talking Stick Resort Arena; 16,270 | 7–12 |
| 20 | November 24 | New Orleans | L 91–115 | T. J. Warren (18) | Tyson Chandler (9) | Mike James (4) | Talking Stick Resort Arena; 16,574 | 7–13 |
| 21 | November 26 | @ Minnesota | L 108–119 | Mike James (26) | Tyson Chandler, Marquese Chriss (7) | Mike James (7) | Target Center; 16,448 | 7–14 |
| 22 | November 28 | @ Chicago | W 104–99 | Devin Booker (33) | Alex Len (18) | Mike James (7) | United Center; 18,324 | 8–14 |
| 23 | November 29 | @ Detroit | L 107–131 | Devin Booker (22) | Josh Jackson, Greg Monroe (7) | Greg Monroe (5) | Little Caesars Arena; 18,096 | 8–15 |

December : 6–9 (home: 2–5; road: 4–4)

| Game | Date | Team | Score | High points | High rebounds | High assists | Location Attendance | Record |
|---|---|---|---|---|---|---|---|---|
| 24 | December 2 | @ Boston | L 111–116 | Devin Booker (38) | Tyson Chandler (18) | Devin Booker, Mike James (5) | TD Garden; 18,624 | 8–16 |
| 25 | December 4 | @ Philadelphia | W 115–101 | Devin Booker (46) | Tyson Chandler (12) | Tyler Ulis (12) | Wells Fargo Center; 20,564 | 9–16 |
| 26 | December 5 | @ Toronto | L 113–126 | Devin Booker (19) | Greg Monroe (10) | Devin Booker (8) | Air Canada Centre; 19,800 | 9–17 |
| 27 | December 7 | Washington | L 99–109 | T. J. Warren (23) | Alex Len, T. J. Warren (8) | Tyler Ulis (6) | Talking Stick Resort Arena; 15,925 | 9–18 |
| 28 | December 9 | San Antonio | L 101–104 | Mike James (25) | Greg Monroe (11) | Tyson Chandler, Mike James, Tyler Ulis, T. J. Warren (2) | Talking Stick Resort Arena; 16,575 | 9–19 |
| 29 | December 12 | @ Sacramento | L 92–99 | T. J. Warren (18) | Tyson Chandler (10) | Mike James (5) | Golden 1 Center; 17,583 | 9–20 |
| 30 | December 13 | Toronto | L 109–115 | Troy Daniels (32) | Greg Monroe (11) | Tyler Ulis (8) | Talking Stick Resort Arena; 15,517 | 9–21 |
| 31 | December 16 | @ Minnesota | W 108–106 | Dragan Bender, Troy Daniels (17) | Alex Len (19) | Isaiah Canaan (7) | Target Center; 18,109 | 10–21 |
| 32 | December 18 | @ Dallas | W 97–91 | T. J. Warren (19) | Alex Len (14) | Isaiah Canaan (6) | American Airlines Center; 19,245 | 11–21 |
| 33 | December 20 | @ L.A. Clippers | L 95–108 | T. J. Warren (22) | T. J. Warren (10) | Mike James, T. J. Warren (4) | Staples Center; 18,995 | 11–22 |
| 34 | December 21 | Memphis | W 97–95 | T. J. Warren (27) | Greg Monroe (12) | Greg Monroe (7) | Talking Stick Resort Arena; 16,339 | 12–22 |
| 35 | December 23 | Minnesota | L 106–115 | T. J. Warren (24) | Tyson Chandler (15) | Isaiah Canaan (9) | Talking Stick Resort Arena; 16,482 | 12–23 |
| 36 | December 26 | Memphis | W 99–97 | Devin Booker (32) | Marquese Chriss (13) | Devin Booker, Tyler Ulis (6) | Talking Stick Resort Arena; 17,105 | 13–23 |
| 37 | December 29 | @ Sacramento | W 111–101 | Devin Booker, T. J. Warren (26) | Tyson Chandler (11) | Isaiah Canaan (6) | Golden 1 Center; 17,583 | 14–23 |
| 38 | December 31 | Philadelphia | L 110–123 | Devin Booker (32) | Tyson Chandler (11) | Devin Booker, Tyler Ulis (6) | Talking Stick Resort Arena; 16,983 | 14–24 |

January : 4–10 (home: 3–3; road: 1–7)

| Game | Date | Team | Score | High points | High rebounds | High assists | Location Attendance | Record |
|---|---|---|---|---|---|---|---|---|
| 39 | January 2 | Atlanta | W 104–103 | Devin Booker (34) | Marquese Chriss (11) | Devin Booker (7) | Talking Stick Resort Arena; 15,921 | 15–24 |
| 40 | January 3 | @ Denver | L 111–134 | Devin Booker (17) | Greg Monroe (10) | Devin Booker (5) | Pepsi Center; 14,079 | 15–25 |
| 41 | January 5 | @ San Antonio | L 89–103 | Devin Booker (21) | Tyson Chandler (12) | Tyler Ulis (6) | AT&T Center; 18,501 | 15–26 |
| 42 | January 7 | Oklahoma City | W 114–100 | Devin Booker (26) | Tyson Chandler (13) | Josh Jackson, Tyler Ulis (5) | Talking Stick Resort Arena; 18,055 | 16–26 |
| 43 | January 12 | Houston | L 95–112 | Devin Booker (27) | Tyson Chandler (11) | Devin Booker, Tyler Ulis (9) | Talking Stick Resort Arena; 18,055 | 16–27 |
| 44 | January 14 | Indiana | L 97–120 | Josh Jackson (21) | Tyson Chandler (14) | Devin Booker (7) | Talking Stick Resort Arena; 17,091 | 16–28 |
| 45 | January 16 | @ Portland | L 111–118 | Devin Booker (43) | Alex Len (10) | Devin Booker (8) | Moda Center; 18,604 | 16–29 |
| 46 | January 19 | @ Denver | W 108–100 | Devin Booker (30) | Tyson Chandler (9) | Isaiah Canaan (6) | Pepsi Center; 15,732 | 17–29 |
| 47 | January 22 | @ Milwaukee | L 105–109 | T. J. Warren (23) | Greg Monroe (7) | Jared Dudley (9) | Bradley Center; 14,766 | 17–30 |
| 48 | January 24 | @ Indiana | L 101–116 | Josh Jackson (20) | Greg Monroe (17) | Devin Booker, Isaiah Canaan (4) | Bankers Life Fieldhouse; 14,060 | 17–31 |
| 49 | January 26 | New York | L 85–107 | T. J. Warren (20) | Greg Monroe (10) | Isaiah Canaan, Jared Dudley (4) | Talking Stick Resort Arena; 17,068 | 17–32 |
| 50 | January 28 | @ Houston | L 102–113 | Devin Booker (37) | Tyson Chandler (15) | Devin Booker (10) | Toyota Center; 18,055 | 17–33 |
| 51 | January 29 | @ Memphis | L 109–120 | T. J. Warren (24) | Josh Jackson, Alex Len (8) | Tyler Ulis (7) | FedExForum; 13,202 | 17–34 |
| 52 | January 31 | Dallas | W 102–88 | Josh Jackson (21) | Marquese Chriss (12) | Devin Booker, T. J. Warren (4) | Talking Stick Resort Arena; 15,923 | 18–34 |

February : 1–10 (home: 0–6; road: 1–4)

| Game | Date | Team | Score | High points | High rebounds | High assists | Location Attendance | Record |
|---|---|---|---|---|---|---|---|---|
| 53 | February 2 | Utah | L 97–129 | Josh Jackson (20) | Dragan Bender (9) | Devin Booker (6) | Talking Stick Resort Arena; 16,560 | 18–35 |
| 54 | February 4 | Charlotte | L 110–115 | Josh Jackson (23) | Tyson Chandler (10) | Devin Booker (9) | Talking Stick Resort Arena; 14,487 | 18–36 |
| 55 | February 6 | @ L.A. Lakers | L 93–112 | T. J. Warren (24) | Tyson Chandler (13) | Tyler Ulis (7) | Staples Center; 18,997 | 18–37 |
| 56 | February 7 | San Antonio | L 81–129 | Alex Len (14) | Marquese Chriss (10) | Josh Gray (7) | Talking Stick Resort Arena; 15,993 | 18–38 |
| 57 | February 10 | Denver | L 113–123 | T. J. Warren (31) | Dragan Bender (8) | Elfrid Payton (9) | Talking Stick Resort Arena; 16,325 | 18–39 |
| 58 | February 12 | @ Golden State | L 83–129 | Elfrid Payton (29) | Tyson Chandler (9) | Elfrid Payton (9) | Oracle Arena; 19,596 | 18–40 |
| 59 | February 14 | @ Utah | L 97–107 | Devin Booker (28) | Elfrid Payton (11) | Elfrid Payton (12) | Vivint Smart Home Arena; 18,306 | 18–41 |
All-Star Break
| 60 | February 23 | L.A. Clippers | L 117–128 | Devin Booker, T. J. Warren (27) | Alex Len (13) | Elfrid Payton (6) | Talking Stick Resort Arena; 17,126 | 18–42 |
| 61 | February 24 | Portland | L 104–106 | Devin Booker (30) | Alex Len (13) | Elfrid Payton (11) | Talking Stick Resort Arena; 17,112 | 18–43 |
| 62 | February 26 | @ New Orleans | L 116–125 | Devin Booker (40) | Josh Jackson (12) | Dragan Bender (7) | Smoothie King Center; 14,302 | 18–44 |
| 63 | February 28 | @ Memphis | W 110–102 | Devin Booker (34) | Alex Len (11) | Josh Jackson, Alex Len, Elfrid Payton (4) | FedExForum; 13,484 | 19–44 |

March : 0–14 (home: 0–6; road: 0–8)

| Game | Date | Team | Score | High points | High rebounds | High assists | Location Attendance | Record |
|---|---|---|---|---|---|---|---|---|
| 64 | March 2 | Oklahoma City | L 116–124 | Devin Booker (39) | Elfrid Payton (10) | Devin Booker, Elfrid Payton (8) | Talking Stick Resort Arena; 18,055 | 19–45 |
| 65 | March 4 | @ Atlanta | L 112–113 | T. J. Warren (35) | Elfrid Payton (10) | Elfrid Payton (14) | Philips Arena; 15,166 | 19–46 |
| 66 | March 5 | @ Miami | L 103–125 | Devin Booker (31) | Josh Jackson (7) | Dragan Bender (6) | American Airlines Arena; 19,600 | 19–47 |
| 67 | March 8 | @ Oklahoma City | L 87–115 | Devin Booker (30) | Devin Booker, Troy Daniels (6) | Elfrid Payton (6) | Chesapeake Energy Arena; 18,203 | 19–48 |
| 68 | March 10 | @ Charlotte | L 115–122 | Troy Daniels (17) | Marquese Chriss, Davon Reed (6) | Tyler Ulis (10) | Spectrum Center; 19,336 | 19–49 |
| 69 | March 13 | Cleveland | L 107–129 | Josh Jackson, T. J. Warren (19) | T. J. Warren (10) | Elfrid Payton (7) | Talking Stick Resort Arena; 18,055 | 19–50 |
| 70 | March 15 | @ Utah | L 88–116 | T. J. Warren (19) | Josh Jackson, Alex Len (9) | Shaquille Harrison, Tyler Ulis (3) | Vivint Smart Home Arena; 18,306 | 19–51 |
| 71 | March 17 | Golden State | L 109–124 | Josh Jackson (36) | Alex Len (9) | Elfrid Payton (9) | Talking Stick Resort Arena; 18,055 | 19–52 |
| 72 | March 20 | Detroit | L 88–115 | Alex Len (19) | Alex Len (12) | Elfrid Payton, Tyler Ulis (5) | Talking Stick Resort Arena; 17,400 | 19–53 |
| 73 | March 23 | @ Cleveland | L 95–120 | Troy Daniels (20) | Marquese Chriss (10) | Tyler Ulis (9) | Quicken Loans Arena; 20,562 | 19–54 |
| 74 | March 24 | @ Orlando | L 99–105 | Josh Jackson (18) | Alex Len (9) | Elfrid Payton (8) | Amway Center; 17,393 | 19–55 |
| 75 | March 26 | Boston | L 94–102 | Josh Jackson (23) | Dragan Bender (10) | Tyler Ulis (8) | Talking Stick Resort Arena; 18,055 | 19–56 |
| 76 | March 28 | L.A. Clippers | L 99–111 | Tyler Ulis (23) | Marquese Chriss (13) | Josh Jackson (5) | Talking Stick Resort Arena; 17,005 | 19–57 |
| 77 | March 30 | @ Houston | L 103–104 | Josh Jackson (27) | Marquese Chriss (12) | Tyler Ulis (11) | Toyota Center; 18,055 | 19–58 |

April : 2–3 (home: 1–2; road: 1–1)

| Game | Date | Team | Score | High points | High rebounds | High assists | Location Attendance | Record |
|---|---|---|---|---|---|---|---|---|
| 78 | April 1 | @ Golden State | L 107–117 | Marquese Chriss, Josh Jackson (22) | Dragan Bender (11) | Tyler Ulis (8) | Oracle Arena; 19,596 | 19–59 |
| 79 | April 3 | Sacramento | W 97–94 | Josh Jackson (28) | Marquese Chriss (13) | Tyler Ulis (9) | Talking Stick Resort Arena; 16,826 | 20–59 |
| 80 | April 6 | New Orleans | L 103–122 | Marquese Chriss (23) | Josh Jackson (11) | Shaquille Harrison (5) | Talking Stick Resort Arena; 18,055 | 20–60 |
| 81 | April 8 | Golden State | L 100–117 | Danuel House (22) | Dragan Bender (14) | Tyler Ulis (10) | Talking Stick Resort Arena; 18,055 | 20–61 |
| 82 | April 10 | @ Dallas | W 124–97 | Alec Peters (36) | Dragan Bender (13) | Shaquille Harrison (10) | American Airlines Center; 20,041 | 21–61 |

2017–18 season schedule

== Player statistics ==
Legend
| GP | Games played | GS | Games started | MPG | Minutes per game |
| FG% | Field-goal percentage | 3P% | 3-point field-goal percentage | FT% | Free-throw percentage |
| RPG | Rebounds per game | APG | Assists per game | SPG | Steals per game |
| BPG | Blocks per game | PPG | Points per game |

Phoenix Suns statistics
| Player | GP | GS | MPG | FG% | 3P% | FT% | RPG | APG | SPG | BPG | PPG |
|---|---|---|---|---|---|---|---|---|---|---|---|
| Dragan Bender | 82 | 37 | 25.2 | .386 | .366 | .765 | 4.4 | 1.6 | 0.3 | 0.6 | 6.5 |
| Eric Bledsoe* | 3 | 3 | 27.7 | .400 | .308 | .786 | 2.3 | 3.0 | 1.3 | 0.7 | 15.7 |
| Devin Booker | 54 | 54 | 34.5 | .432 | .383 | .878 | 4.5 | 4.7 | 0.9 | 0.3 | 24.9 |
| Isaiah Canaan* | 19 | 1 | 22.0 | .382 | .333 | .902 | 2.3 | 4.0 | 0.8 | 0.1 | 9.1 |
| Tyson Chandler | 46 | 46 | 25.0 | .647 | .000 | .617 | 9.1 | 1.2 | 0.3 | 0.6 | 6.5 |
| Marquese Chriss | 72 | 49 | 21.2 | .423 | .295 | .608 | 5.5 | 1.2 | 0.7 | 1.0 | 7.7 |
| Troy Daniels | 79 | 15 | 20.5 | .403 | .400 | .875 | 1.6 | 0.6 | 0.3 | 0.1 | 8.9 |
| Jared Dudley | 48 | 0 | 14.3 | .393 | .363 | .771 | 1.9 | 1.6 | 0.5 | 0.2 | 3.2 |
| Josh Gray | 5 | 0 | 17.2 | .268 | .231 | .636 | 2.0 | 2.4 | 1.6 | 0.4 | 6.4 |
| Shaquille Harrison | 23 | 2 | 16.7 | .476 | .231 | .737 | 2.7 | 2.4 | 1.1 | 0.3 | 6.6 |
| Danuel House Jr. | 23 | 3 | 17.5 | .434 | .259 | .806 | 3.3 | 1.1 | 0.3 | 0.3 | 6.6 |
| Josh Jackson | 77 | 35 | 25.4 | .417 | .263 | .634 | 4.6 | 1.5 | 1.0 | 0.5 | 13.1 |
| Mike James* | 32 | 10 | 20.9 | .388 | .268 | .762 | 2.5 | 3.5 | 0.8 | 0.2 | 10.4 |
| Derrick Jones Jr.* | 6 | 0 | 5.5 | .500 | .000 | .833 | 0.7 | 0.5 | 0.2 | 0.7 | 1.5 |
| Oleksiy "Alex" Len | 69 | 13 | 20.2 | .566 | .333 | .684 | 7.5 | 1.2 | 0.4 | 0.9 | 8.5 |
| Greg Monroe* | 20 | 14 | 23.3 | .626 | .000 | .674 | 8.0 | 2.5 | 0.8 | 0.3 | 11.3 |
| Elfrid Payton* | 19 | 19 | 29.0 | .435 | .200 | .685 | 5.3 | 6.2 | 1.0 | 0.3 | 11.8 |
| Alec Peters | 20 | 0 | 11.3 | .378 | .310 | .800 | 1.9 | 0.6 | 0.1 | 0.1 | 4.1 |
| Davon Reed | 21 | 1 | 11.5 | .289 | .289 | .667 | 1.9 | 0.6 | 0.5 | 0.1 | 3.0 |
| Tyler Ulis | 71 | 43 | 23.4 | .388 | .288 | .832 | 1.8 | 4.4 | 1.0 | 0.1 | 7.8 |
| T. J. Warren | 65 | 65 | 33.0 | .498 | .222 | .757 | 5.1 | 1.3 | 1.0 | 0.6 | 19.6 |
| Alan Williams | 5 | 0 | 14.0 | .389 | .000 | .630 | 5.7 | 0.6 | 0.6 | 0.2 | 4.0 |

* – Stats with the Suns.

== Awards and records ==
=== Awards ===
- Josh Jackson earned All-NBA First Team Las Vegas Summer League Honors due to his consistent overall performances throughout the 2017 NBA Summer League.
- As a result of the new updates for entry into the Naismith Basketball Hall of Fame, both former Suns point guards Jason Kidd and Steve Nash, as well as former small forward Grant Hill were eligible for entry into the Hall of Fame in 2018. On March 29, 2018, it was reported that all three of these players were elected to the Basketball Hall of Fame under the Class of 2018. Two days later, during the Final Four in San Antonio, it was confirmed that former 1970's Suns player Charlie Scott and former Suns CEO and executive Rick Welts would join them as well. This made them the first team to have four former players of theirs entering the Basketball of Fame in the same year.
- On April 6, 2018, Devin Booker became the first Suns player to be invited to the Team USA Basketball squad since Amar'e Stoudemire and Shawn Marion back in 2004.
- Josh Jackson was named a member of an All-NBA Second Rookie Team this season on May 22, 2018. He earned the honor above Edrice Adebayo for his improved performances entering 2018. He was the second Suns player to earn that honor, with Marquese Chriss getting in last year, as well as the third year a Suns rookie was in an All-Rookie Team with Devin Booker being on the All-NBA Rookie First Team in 2016.

==== Week/Month ====
- Josh Jackson was named a consistent candidate for the Western Conference's Rookie of the Month starting in the calendar month of 2018 onward.

==== All-Star ====
- Devin Booker was announced to participate in the three-point contest for the second time in three years on January 23, 2018. While Booker injured himself on February 4 against the Charlotte Hornets, which left him out most of the month, he was still able to participate in the three-point contest.
  - Three days after making his playing return against the Utah Jazz, he won the three-point contest over finalists Tobias Harris and Klay Thompson on February 17, 2018. To win, Booker first tied Thompson with 19 points scored in the first round before recording a record-high 28 points to win the final round over Harris' 17 points and Thompson's 25 points. He became the second Suns player to win the three-point contest, joining Quentin Richardson in 2005.
- Josh Jackson was named the last member of the All-NBA Second Rookie Team on May 22, 2018.

=== Records ===
- Mike James became the first two-way contract player in NBA history to start in an NBA game, doing it on October 23, 2017, under interim head coach Jay Triano for the first win of the season.
- On October 28, 2017, Devin Booker hit 258 three-pointers in the NBA before turning 21 years old. That breaks the record previously set by Bradley Beal at 229 before he became 21 years old himself.
- With the 34 point performance he had that night, he officially had the third-most 30+ point games in the NBA before turning 21 years old, with him getting what would be his 21st 30+ game there.
- He'd also end his time as a 20-year-old player by scoring 2,897 points in the NBA, still being the fourth youngest player in the NBA to do so before turning 21 years old.
- Devin Booker became the fifth active player in NBA history to have at least 28 games of 30 or more points in 175 games in the league, joining Vince Carter, LeBron James, Dwyane Wade, and Kevin Durant.
- On January 29, 2018, the Phoenix Suns took the record for the most NBA games played where they made at least one three-pointer in each game (reaching the record of 1,109 games with that status), starting in the 2004–05 season and breaking that record early in the first quarter that night by a three-pointer from Troy Daniels.
- Marquese Chriss becomes the third-youngest player to record 100 career steals, blocks, and three-pointers on January 31, 2018, in their 102–88 win over the Dallas Mavericks. The only players younger than him to do that were LeBron James and Kevin Durant, with Kobe Bryant being the only other player under 21 years old to be a part of that record.
- Shaquille Harrison became the first player since Mario Chalmers in 2008 to have two of his first four games involve four or more steals in each of those games. He also joined Alvan Adams as the only Suns players to have that same feat during their first four games of their rookie seasons.
- Devin Booker became the third-youngest player in NBA history to reach 4,000 points at 21 years, 143 days, reaching that mark by recording 39 points (and 6 rebounds and 8 assists) in a 124–116 loss to the Oklahoma City Thunder on March 2, 2018. The only players younger than him to reach that mark at such a young age are LeBron James at 20 years old and Kevin Durant at 21 years, 66 days old.

=== Team records ===
- Mike James becomes the first rookie since Walter Davis to record at least four straight games of 10+ points in their first four games with the franchise as a rookie.
- Isaiah Canaan became the first bench player in franchise history to record his first two games with at least 15 points and 5 assists in each game he came off the bench.
- Elfrid Payton recorded 9 assists in a 123–113 loss to the Denver Nuggets on February 10, 2018. That was the most for a new point guard coming to Phoenix in his first game since Stephon Marbury made his Suns debut back in 2001.
- Elfrid Payton recorded a triple-double with 13 points, 12 assists, and 11 rebounds in only his third game with the Suns in a 107–97 loss to the Utah Jazz on February 14, 2018. This resulted in the quickest triple-double for a new Suns player in franchise history, breaking the record previously held by the late Connie Hawkins in his fifth game back in 1969.
- Shaquille Harrison made his NBA debut with 4 steals on February 23, 2018, in a 128–117 loss to the Los Angeles Clippers. That was the most steals for a Suns player's debut game since Alvan Adams back in his rookie year of 1975.
- Alec Peters broke the franchise record for most three-pointers made by a rookie on April 10, 2018, in a blowout 124–97 win over the Dallas Mavericks at the end of the season. He broke the record previously held by Devin Booker, who had 6 in his rookie season for a game.

=== Milestones ===
- Tyson Chandler overtook center Sam Lacey to become the 41st highest rebounder in NBA history. Chandler recorded 9 rebounds in the second game of the season on October 19, 2017, with a 132–130 loss over the Los Angeles Lakers.
- Tyson Chandler also tied power forward Shawn Kemp to become the 48th best shot blocker in NBA history with a block that same night. He surpassed Kemp five days later with a single block in a 97–88 win over the Utah Jazz.
- Tyson Chandler overtook Hall of Fame center Bob Lanier to become the 40th highest rebounder in NBA history a day later on October 21. He'd get to 10–12 rebounds early in the third quarter to overtake Bob Lanier's position and reach the 9,700 rebound threshold respectively before ending the night with 14 rebounds in a blowout 130–88 loss on the road against the Los Angeles Clippers.
- Tyson Chandler later tied both Hall of Fame small forward Julius Erving and center Greg Ostertag to become the 46th best shot blocker in league history, thanks to a single block in a 108–106 win over the Minnesota Timberwolves on December 16, 2017. Chandler became the sole possessor of that mark ten days later with a block involved in his improbable buzzer-beating 99–97 win over the Memphis Grizzlies.
- Tyson Chandler wound up becoming only the 40th player in NBA history to reach the historic 10,000 rebound barrier. He recorded his 10,000th rebound in the fourth quarter on January 14, 2018, against the Indiana Pacers. Chandler recorded 14 rebounds that night to reach 10,003 total rebounds in a loss to Indiana.
- Tyson Chandler overtook Johnny Kerr to become the 39th highest rebounder in NBA history. He recorded 4 rebounds in an injury ridden 122–115 loss to the Charlotte Hornets on March 10, 2018.

=== Team milestones ===
- Eric Bledsoe surpassed both former point guards Kyle Macy and Stephon Marbury as the team's newest 24th best scorer in franchise history on October 19, 2017, in a close 132–130 loss over the Los Angeles Lakers in what was to be the penultimate game for Earl Watson as head coach of the Suns and for Eric as a Suns player. Bledsoe recorded a three-pointer in the first quarter to tie Macy's mark before making two free-throws and another three-pointer to not only surpass Macy by the end of the first quarter, but easily surpass Marbury with two more baskets early in the third quarter; he'd end the game with 28 points in a rather unfortunate, yet close loss that night.
- Early in the season, Alex Len tied former teammate Channing Frye (who has 286 blocks with Phoenix) as the 11th best shot blocker in Phoenix Suns history. He recorded a block on October 28, 2017, in a 114–107 loss to the Portland Trail Blazers. He then overtook Frye's spot on November 1, 2017, with a block at 8:16 in the second quarter in a comeback 122–116 win over the Washington Wizards.
- Jared Dudley surpassed former center James Edwards as the team's newest 30th best scorer in team history. Jared hit that mark early in the first quarter by scoring a lay-up and a three-pointer early in the first quarter (ending the quarter with 8 points) on November 8, 2017, in a 126–115 loss against the Miami Heat. Not too long afterward, Dudley surpassed his two-time former teammate Markieff Morris (once with the Suns and once with the Washington Wizards) to be the 29th best scorer in team history in the same game, finishing the night off with 13 points total before the end of the third quarter. He reverted to the 30th best scorer before the end of the season via Devin Booker breaking through his scoring barrier by March 2018.
- Not long afterward, Alex Len overtook former Suns power forward/center Clifford R. Robinson to make it into the Suns' top 10 for blocked shots in terms of tenures with the franchise. He recorded two blocks to go with a double-double of 21 points and 13 rebounds on November 10, 2017, in a 128–112 blowout loss to the Orlando Magic.
- Devin Booker and T. J. Warren became the first teammates since Steve Nash and Amar'e Stoudemire did it back on March 31, 2008, to record a game where they both scored at least 35 points in the same night, doing so on November 11, 2017, in a 118–110 win over the Minnesota Timberwolves.
- Devin Booker became the first Suns player since Charlie Scott back in 1973 to have seven 30+ point games during the first 17 games of a regular season.
- On November 24, 2017, Alex Len became the 10th player in franchise history to record 300 blocks with the Phoenix Suns. He recorded 2 blocks to reach #300 in a blowout 115–91 loss to the New Orleans Pelicans.
- Center Alex Len surpassed former power former Garfield Heard as the 9th best shot blocker in franchise history. He surpassed Garfield Heard's spot on December 7, 2017, with two blocks in the first half against the Washington Wizards before the team lost 109–99 under their first game without Devin Booker due to a relatively serious injury at the time.
- Center Tyson Chandler became only the fifth Suns player in franchise history to record 10,000 rebounds throughout an entire career, joining Paul Silas, Charles Barkley, Shawn Marion, and Shaquille O'Neal on January 14, 2018, in a blowout loss against the Indiana Pacers.
- Devin Booker replaced Joe Johnson to become the newest member of the franchise's top 10 for three-point shooters with five three-point shots made in a 113–102 loss to the Houston Rockets.
- Jared Dudley became only the 29th player in franchise history to break the 4,000 point barrier with the Suns, doing it by reaching the mark on January 29, 2018, against the Memphis Grizzlies, with the first two free-throws he made at the start of the second quarter before recording 13 points in a 120–109 loss in Memphis.
- In only his third season in the NBA, Devin Booker overtook both former center James Edwards and his former teammate in power forward Markieff Morris to become the team's newest 30th best scorer in franchise history, doing so around the end of February 2018. On February 26, 2018, Booker recorded 40 points to go with 10 rebounds and 7 assists in a loss to the New Orleans Pelicans to overtake James Edwards, while he'd overtake Markieff Morris as the 30th best scorer in franchise history two days later on February 28 with a three-pointer in the second quarter, with Booker ending the game with 34 points scored in a 110–102 win over the Memphis Grizzlies.
- Not long afterward, Booker became the 30th player in franchise history to break through the 4,000 point barrier on March 2 in a 124–116 loss against the Oklahoma City Thunder. During that game, Booker had 39 points to go with 8 assists and 6 rebounds to break through that barrier with 4,010+ points in only his third season in the league.
- On that same night, center Alex Len tied former center Oliver Miller to become the team's 8th best shot blocker in franchise history. He tied that mark by tying a career-high 6 blocks in that loss against the Thunder. Len surpassed Oliver Miller with a block against Oklahoma City six days later on March 8.
- On March 4, 2018, Devin Booker overtook his teammate, Jared Dudley, to be the 29th highest scorer in franchise history in a close, heartbreaking 113–112 loss to the Atlanta Hawks. During that game, Booker recorded 20 points, while Dudley didn't play at all.
- Four days later, Devin Booker overtook former shooting guard and current broadcaster Eddie Johnson to be the 28th highest scorer in franchise history. In that game, he scored 30 points in a blowout loss to the Oklahoma City Thunder.

== Injuries/Personal games missed ==
| Player | Duration | | Reason for Missed Time | Games Missed |
| Player | Start | End | Reason for Missed Time | Games Missed |
|---|---|---|---|---|
| Jared Dudley | June 23, 2017 | October 23, 2017 | Required surgery on a left toe bone and ligament. | 3 |
| Brandon Knight | July 20, 2017 | The Entire Season | Accidentally tore his ACL while playing a pickup game in Florida. | 82 |
| Davon Reed | August 25, 2017 | January 14, 2018 | Needed surgery on a torn left meniscus. | 43 |
| Alan Williams | September 22, 2017 | March 26, 2018 | Partially tore his right meniscus during practice. | 74 |
| Oleksiy "Alex" Len | October 14, 2017 | October 20, 2017 | Sprained left ankle during practice. | 1 |
| Eric Bledsoe | October 23, 2017 | November 7, 2017 (Traded) | Sent home after subtly demanding a trade via Twitter. | 8 |
| Alec Peters | October 23, 2017 | January 12, 2018 | Assigned to the Northern Arizona Suns by Phoenix via two-way contract. | 39 |
| Jared Dudley | October 25, 2017 | November 5, 2017 | Training to get back into proper game shape. | 5 |
| Derrick Jones Jr. | November 7, 2017 | November 24, 2017 | Assigned to the Northern Arizona Suns by Phoenix. | 8 |
| Greg Monroe | November 7, 2017 | November 16, 2017 | Had a sore left calf on October 26 back when he played in Milwaukee. | 4 |
| Tyson Chandler | November 8, 2017 | November 11, 2017 | Was dealing with back spasms at the time. | 2 |
| Jared Dudley | November 11, 2017 | November 24, 2017 | Sprained right knee in the fourth quarter during the home Orlando game. | 6 |
| Tyson Chandler | November 16, 2017 | November 22, 2017 | Had an illness. | 3 |
| Devin Booker | November 26, 2017 | November 28, 2017 | Had an inflamed right big toe. | 1 |
| Devin Booker | December 5, 2017 | December 26, 2017 | Strained adductor in fourth quarter against Toronto. | 9 |
| Danuel House | December 26, 2017 | January 5, 2018 | Hurt his right foot against Minnesota. | 5 |
| Jared Dudley | January 2, 2018 | January 7, 2018 | Had an illness entering the new year. | 3 |
| T. J. Warren | January 5, 2018 | January 7, 2018 | Acquired an illness after the road Denver game. | 1 |
| Isaiah Canaan | January 5, 2018 | January 14, 2018 | Tore his left adductor during the road Denver game. | 3 |
| Marquese Chriss | January 7, 2018 | January 26, 2018 | Strained right hip in second quarter against Oklahoma City. | 6 |
| Josh Jackson | January 12, 2018 | January 14, 2018 | Strained right hip during off day practicing. | 1 |
| T. J. Warren | January 14, 2018 | January 19, 2018 | Got sore back after the home Houston game. | 2 |
| Alex Len | January 24, 2018 | January 29, 2018 | Got sore right ankle during the road Milwaukee game. | 2 |
| Devin Booker | January 28, 2018 | January 31, 2018 | Had a rib contusion in the fourth quarter of the road Houston game. | 1 |
| Marquese Chriss | January 28, 2018 | January 31, 2018 | Sprained left ankle during the road Houston game. | 1 |
| Alex Len | January 31, 2018 | February 4, 2018 | Flared up ankle injury after road Memphis game. | 2 |
| Isaiah Canaan | January 31, 2018 | The Rest of The Season | Fractured his tibia near the end of the first quarter against Dallas. | 30 |
| Marquese Chriss | February 3, 2018 | February 6, 2018 | Suspended for arguing with an assistant coach after the home Utah game. | 1 |
| Devin Booker | February 4, 2018 | February 14, 2018 | Hurt left hip during fourth quarter in home Charlotte game. | 4 |
| Tyson Chandler | February 6, 2018 | February 12, 2018 | Hurt his neck after the road Los Angeles Lakers game. | 2 |
| Tyler Ulis | February 7, 2018 | February 14, 2018 | Hurt his back during the home San Antonio game. | 2 |
| Tyson Chandler | February 14, 2018 | March 4, 2018 | Neck continued to hurt him after the All-Star break. | 6 |
| Tyler Ulis | February 23, 2018 | March 10, 2018 | Back continued hurting after the All-Star break. | 8 |
| T. J. Warren | February 28, 2018 | March 2, 2018 | Hurt his tailbone during the road New Orleans game. | 1 |
| Troy Daniels | March 5, 2018 | March 8, 2018 | Hyperextended his right knee before playing the home Miami game. | 1 |
| T. J. Warren | March 8, 2018 | March 13, 2018 | Had a sore back during the home Miami game. | 2 |
| Josh Jackson | March 10, 2018 | March 13, 2018 | Hurt left knee during road Oklahoma City game. | 1 |
| Devin Booker | March 10, 2018 | March 13, 2018 | Strained left triceps after road Oklahoma City game. | 1 |
| Tyson Chandler | March 13, 2018 | The Rest of The Season | Neck continued hurting him alongside shoulder. | 14 |
| Devin Booker | March 17, 2018 | The Rest of The Season | Hand hurt him badly before home Golden State game. | 12 |
| T. J. Warren | March 20, 2018 | The Rest of The Season | Injured hand after home Golden State game. | 11 |
| Elfrid Payton | March 28, 2018 | The Rest of The Season | Got left knee tendonitis during home Boston game. | 7 |
| Alex Len | March 28, 2018 | April 3, 2018 | Tweaked ankle during home Boston game. | 3 |
| Alan Williams | April 6, 2018 | The Rest of The Season | Got discomfort during home Sacramento game. | 3 |
| Marquese Chriss | April 8, 2018 | The Rest of The Season | Experienced hip pain after home New Orleans game. | 2 |
| Josh Jackson | April 8, 2018 | The Rest of The Season | Hurt his quadriceps during the home New Orleans game. | 2 |
| Troy Daniels | April 10, 2018 | April 10, 2018 | Sprained his ankle during the home Golden State game. | 1 |

== Transactions ==
=== Trades ===
September 22, 2017

To Phoenix Suns

(United States) Troy Daniels
2018 second-round pick (from Charlotte via Memphis)

To Memphis Grizzlies

2018 Top-55 protected second-round pick

November 7, 2017

To Phoenix Suns

(United States) Greg Monroe
2020 protected first-round pick
2018 Top-47 protected second-round pick

To Milwaukee Bucks

(United States) Eric Bledsoe

February 8, 2018

To Phoenix Suns

(United States) Elfrid Payton

To Orlando Magic

2018 second-round pick (from Charlotte via Memphis & Phoenix)

I: The second round pick the Suns originally planned to get before trading it to Orlando involved them getting the middle second round choice between the Memphis Grizzlies, the Charlotte Hornets, and the Miami Heat. Since the Hornets had the middle record of those three teams, their selection became the pick that was traded to Phoenix first and then Orlando afterward.
II: For the Milwaukee Bucks' two selections traded to Phoenix, they were originally both meant to convey with varying protections to their names at hand. Specifically, their first-round pick would convey to Phoenix if it was inside the top 16 and their second round pick could only convey if it was outside of the top 47. Unfortunately for the Suns, the Bucks landed directly in the worst of both worlds this season, meaning they not only could not get their second round pick at all (being conveyed to the Brooklyn Nets via another trade instead), but the tiebreaker for the first round resulted in Milwaukee's pick staying with them since it was outside of the top 16. Their first-round pick remained protected until 2020 due to another external factor of not having one of the best records in a season finally being lifted that year.

=== Free agents ===
==== Re-signed ====
| Player | Signed | Date |
|---|---|---|
| Alan Williams | Signed 3-year partially guaranteed deal worth $17 Million | July 27, 2017 |
| Alex Len | Signed 1-year qualifying offer worth $4.2 Million | September 25, 2017 |
| T. J. Warren | Signed 4-year contract extension worth $50 Million | September 26, 2017 |
| Mike James | Re-signed for a 1-year non-guaranteed deal worth $580,607 | December 7, 2017 |

==== Additions ====
| Player | Signed | Former team |
|---|---|---|
| Mike James | Originally signed two-way contract around $235,008 | (Greece) Panathinaikos Athens Superfoods B.C. |
| Danuel House Jr. | Signed two-way contract worth around $75,000–$204,000 | Houston Rockets / Rio Grande Valley Vipers |
| Isaiah Canaan | Signed 1-year disabled player's exception worth $1,069,308 | Houston Rockets / Northern Arizona Suns |
| Josh Gray | Signed two 10-day contracts worth $92,160 | Northern Arizona Suns |
| Shaquille Harrison | Signed two 10-day contracts / 2-year deal worth $1,608,642 | Northern Arizona Suns |

a: Mike James initially signed with the Suns as their first ever two-way contract, which was first implemented by the NBA this season. Originally, James could only earn as much as $235,008 under that deal due to the fact that he had no interest in playing for anyone in the NBA G League. However, he later signed a full-scale deal with the Suns after his two-way contract expired on December 9, 2017 to earn $580,607 minimum for the year due to the fact that two-way contracts earned less pay when compared to other NBA players, including those that get called up directly from the NBA G League to the NBA.
b: After Mike James concluded his original two-way contract with the Suns, the team decided to sign former Washington Wizards player, Houston Rockets trainee, and Rio Grande Valley Vipers player Danuel House Jr. to his own two-way contract. However, because he signed one later in the season, his days playing in the NBA were much shorter, which also meant a shorter payscale for House by comparison.
c: Danuel House Jr. was previously a player for the Houston Rockets' training camp squad before being transferred to the Rio Grande Valley Vipers at the start of the season.
d: Isaiah Canaan originally signed a short-term disabled player's exception once star shooting Devin Booker got hurt in the month of December. However, due to his surprisingly positive performances during that time, Canaan signed a full-length contract around Devin Booker's return on January 7, 2017.
e: During this season, Isaiah Canaan played for the Houston Rockets before being waived in the month of November. A month later, Canaan signed a short-term deal to play for the new expansion Agua Caliente Clippers, but the Agua Caliente squad traded him to the Northern Arizona Suns before having a chance to play a game for them. However, Canaan did play one single game for the Northern Arizona Suns before being called back up into the NBA.
f: Originally, Shaquille Harrison signed only two 10-day contracts with the Phoenix Suns, similar to that of his former teammate, Josh Gray. However, when Harrison surprised the team with his defensive abilities, the Phoenix Suns gave him a partially guaranteed two-year deal for $1,608,642 on March 13, 2018.

==== Subtractions ====
| Player | Reason left | New team |
|---|---|---|
| Leandro Barbosa | Waived | (Brazil) Franca Basquetebol Clube |
| Ronnie Price | Free Agent / Waived | —N/a (Retired) |
| Elijah Millsap | Waived | Northern Arizona Suns / Iowa Wolves |
| Eric Bledsoe | Traded | Milwaukee Bucks |
| Derrick Jones Jr. | Waived | Northern Arizona Suns / Miami Heat / Sioux Falls Skyforce |
| Mike James | Waived | New Orleans Pelicans / (Greece) Panathinaikos Athens Superfoods B.C. |
| Greg Monroe | Waived / Bought out contract | Boston Celtics |
| Isaiah Canaan | Waived | Phoenix Suns |
| Josh Gray | Second 10-day contract expired / Waived | Northern Arizona Suns |

g: Ronnie Price did not sign with any team during the season. During the 2018–19 NBA season, he returned to the Suns as scout for the team, officially retiring as a player in the league.
h: After being the last cut in training camp before the regular season began, Elijah Millsap was considered eligible to return to the Northern Arizona Suns after being waived from the parent team. However, before the start of the 2017–18 NBA G League season, Millsap was traded to the Iowa Wolves where he remained for the rest of the season.
i: To make room for Mike James once his two-way contract expired, they waived Derrick Jones Jr.
j: Derrick Jones Jr. played for the Northern Arizona Suns for the rest of 2017 before signing a two-way contract with the Miami Heat on December 31, 2017. On the Miami contract, he split time between the Miami Heat and the Sioux Falls Skyforce of the NBA G League for the rest of early 2018, mostly with Sioux Falls.
k: When Devin Booker returned from injury, the Suns waived Mike Jones.
l: Mike James had signed another two-way contract with the New Orleans Pelicans before the January 15, 2018, deadline for two-way contract signees, but ultimately requested a waiver from the Pelicans after a few games there and returned to Greece with the Panathinaikos Athens Superfoods B.C. for the rest of the season.
m: Greg Monroe was bought out from his contract on January 31, 2018, hours before Isaiah Canaan's injury occurred.
n: After fracturing his tibia, Canaan remained with the team before the season's trade deadline concluded. Once the Suns traded for Elfrid Payton, Canaan was waived from the team on February 8, 2018, though he still trained in Phoenix for recovery.
o: Canaan briefly returned to the Phoenix Suns for the start of the following season on August 3, 2018.
p: Josh Gray signed a second 10-day contract on February 11, 2018, but was waived near the end of his original 10-day contract in order to sign his former Northern Arizona teammate, Shaquille Harrison.
