= Josh Gray (basketball) =

American basketball player (born 1993)

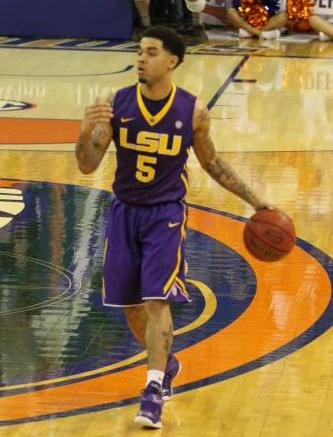
- Gray with the LSU Tigers in 2015

Golden Eagle Ylli
- Position: Point guard

Personal information
- Born: September 9, 1993 (age 33) Lake Charles, Louisiana, U.S.
- Listed height: 6 ft 1 in (1.85 m)
- Listed weight: 168 lb (76 kg)

Career information
- High school: Washington-Marion (Lake Charles, Louisiana); Christian Life (Houston, Texas); Wheatley (Houston, Texas)
- College: Texas Tech (2012–2013); Odessa (2013–2014); LSU (2014–2016)
- NBA draft: 2016: undrafted
- Playing career: 2016–present

Career history
- 2016–2018: Northern Arizona Suns
- 2018: Phoenix Suns
- 2018: Northern Arizona Suns
- 2018–2019: Changwon LG Sakers
- 2019–2020: New Orleans Pelicans
- 2019–2020: →Erie Bayhawks
- 2021: Fort Wayne Mad Ants
- 2021–2022: Long Island Nets
- 2022–2023: Lokomotiv Kuban
- 2023: Real Betis
- 2023–2024: Heidelberg
- 2024: Shijiazhuang Xianglan
- 2024–2025: Khasin Khuleguud
- 2025: CS Maristes
- 2025: Dorados de Chihuahua
- 2026–present: Golden Eagle Ylli

Career highlights
- NBA G League Scoring Leader (2020)
- Stats at NBA.com
- Stats at Basketball Reference

Joshia Gray (born September 9, 1993) is an American professional basketball player for the CS Maristes of Lebanese Basketball League. He previously played for the Long Island Nets of the NBA G League, as well college basketball for Texas Tech, Odessa College and LSU.

== Early life ==
Born in Lake Charles, Louisiana, Gray had a difficult time growing up, losing his mother when he was 16 and getting trouble with the law as a teenager, being arrested multiple times, forcing him to bounce from school to school.

Gray first attended Washington-Marion Magnet High School, leading them to the 2010 Louisiana Class 4A State Semifinals in his sophomore season. As a junior, he transferred to Christian Life Center Academy, where he averaged 20 points per game and led them to a 20–4 record. In his senior season, he transferred to Wheatley High School where he averaged 24 points, six assists and three steals and led them to the Class 4A playoffs.

== College career ==
Gray began his college career at Texas Tech, averaging 26.7 minutes per game, 9.3 points, 3.2 assists and 2.5 steals as a freshman. In his sophomore season, he transferred to Odessa College, averaging 34.7 points, 5.9 assists and 2.7 steals, earning First Team JC All-America honors and the conference MVP.

As a junior, he transferred to LSU and was able to play immediately for them due to Odessa being a junior college. He would then average 7.1 points, 2.3 rebounds, and 3.8 assists as a junior and 5.4 points, 2.1 rebounds and 1.8 assists as a senior, with the latter season having eventual #1 pick Ben Simmons as a teammate that year.

== Professional career ==
=== Northern Arizona Suns (2016–2018) ===
After going undrafted in the 2016 NBA draft, Gray tried out with the Orlando Magic in the 2016 NBA Summer League. Gray was then acquired by the Northern Arizona Suns on October 31, 2016, after multiple successful local tryouts, which included paid tryouts with the Los Angeles D-Fenders and Austin Spurs. On November 12, he made his professional debut in a 121–104 win over the Iowa Energy, recording 13 points, three rebounds and three assists in 18 minutes off the bench. On November 27, he recorded his first career triple-double after posting 24 points, 13 rebounds and 11 assists in a 98–89 win over the Sioux Falls Skyforce.

=== Phoenix Suns (2018) ===
On February 1, 2018, after Isaiah Canaan fractured his fibula the previous night against the Dallas Mavericks, the Phoenix Suns signed Gray to a 10-day contract to help shore up the point guard spot a bit. He made his debut a day later, recording 7 points, 1 rebound, and 1 assist in 8 minutes of play in a blowout loss to the Utah Jazz. Gray would put up season-highs of 9 points and a team-high 7 assists in a February 6 blowout loss to the San Antonio Spurs. He would sign his second 10-day contract on February 11 before being waived on February 21 for Shaquille Harrison. He returned to Northern Arizona afterwards.

=== Changwon LG Sakers (2018–2019) ===
On August 18, 2018, Changwon LG Sakers of the Korean Basketball League was reported to have signed Gray.

=== New Orleans Pelicans (2019–2020) ===
In July 2019, Gray joined the Brooklyn Nets for the 2019 NBA Summer League. On July 25, the New Orleans Pelicans announced that Gray had signed a two-way contract. Gray averaged 22.5 points, 5.1 rebounds, 7.3 assists and 2.4 steals per game in 37 games in the G League.

On November 24, 2020, Gray was traded to the Oklahoma City Thunder, but was then waived on December 1, 2020. On December 18, 2020, Gray signed with the Indiana Pacers but was waived on the next day.

=== Fort Wayne Mad Ants (2021) ===
On January 11, 2021, Gray was included in the single site season roster by the Fort Wayne Mad Ants.

=== Long Island Nets (2021–2022) ===
On September 23, 2021, the Long Island Nets announced that they had acquired the returning right to Gray from the Fort Wayne Mad Ants for the returning right to Justin Anderson. On October 10, 2021, Gray signed with the Brooklyn Nets, but was waived the next day. On October 25, 2021, Gray was included in the training camp roster of the Long Island Nets. On January 27, 2022, Gray was waived.

=== Lokomotiv Kuban (2022–2023) ===
In 2022, Gray signed with Lokomotiv Kuban of the VTB United League.

=== Real Betis (2023) ===
On January 27, 2023, he signed with Real Betis of the Liga ACB.

=== Khasin Khuleguud (2024–2025) ===
On December 31, 2024, Gray signed with the Khasin Khuleguud of The League.

=== CS Maristes (2025) ===
On February 20, 2025, Gray signed with the CS Maristes of Lebanese Basketball League.

== Personal life ==
The son of Charnella Robinson and Noah Gray Sr., he has one son, Kayson, as well as four brothers: Novon, Travon, Joseph and Noah Jr. Gray graduated with a bachelor's degree in interdisciplinary studies.

== Career statistics ==
Legend
GP	Games played	GS	Games started	MPG	Minutes per game
FG%	Field goal percentage	3P%	3-point field goal percentage	FT%	Free throw percentage
RPG	Rebounds per game	APG	Assists per game	SPG	Steals per game
BPG	Blocks per game	PPG	Points per game	**Bold**	Career high

=== NBA ===
==== Regular season ====
Year	Team	GP	GS	MPG	FG%	3P%	FT%	RPG	APG	SPG	BPG	PPG
2017–18	Phoenix	**5**	0	**17.2**	.268	**.231**	**.636**	**2.0**	**2.4**	**1.6**	**0.4**	**6.4**
2019–20	New Orleans	2	0	11.5	**.500**	–	–	1.0	1.0	.0	.0	1.0
Career		7	0	15.6	.279	.231	.636	1.7	2.0	1.1	0.3	4.9

=== College ===
Year	Team	GP	GS	MPG	FG%	3P%	FT%	RPG	APG	SPG	BPG	PPG
2012–13	Texas Tech	31	**31**	**26.7**	.363	.188	**.697**	**2.5**	3.2	**2.0**	**.1**	**9.3**
2014–15	LSU	31	20	24.8	.396	**.264**	.583	2.1	**3.8**	1.0	.0	7.1
2015–16	LSU	**32**	9	15.5	**.440**	.211	.650	2.1	1.8	1.0	.0	5.4
Career		94	60	22.3	.392	.216	.651	2.2	2.9	1.3	.0	7.3
