= Alan Williams (basketball) =

American basketball player (born 1993)

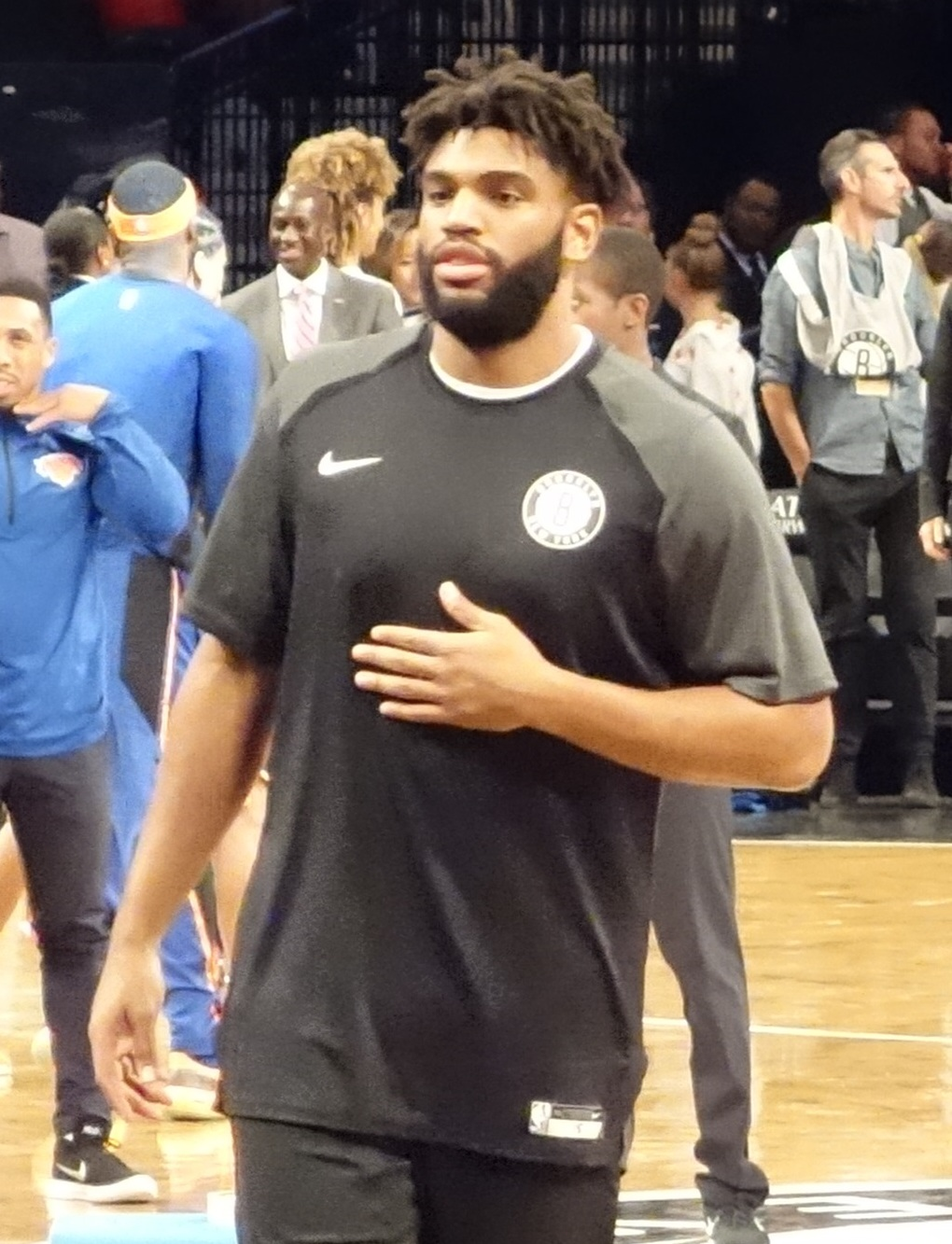
- Williams with the Brooklyn Nets in 2018

No. 15 – Nagoya Diamond Dolphins
- Position: Center / power forward
- League: B.League

Personal information
- Born: January 28, 1993 (age 33) Phoenix, Arizona, U.S.
- Listed height: 6 ft 8 in (2.03 m)
- Listed weight: 256 lb (116 kg)

Career information
- High school: North (Phoenix, Arizona)
- College: UC Santa Barbara (2011–2015)
- NBA draft: 2015: undrafted
- Playing career: 2015–present

Career history
- 2015–2016: Qingdao DoubleStar Eagles
- 2016–2018: Phoenix Suns
- 2016; 2018: →Northern Arizona Suns
- 2018–2019: Brooklyn Nets
- 2018–2019: →Long Island Nets
- 2019: Shaanxi Xinda
- 2019–2022: Lokomotiv Kuban
- 2022–2023: South East Melbourne Phoenix
- 2023: Nagoya Diamond Dolphins
- 2023–2024: South East Melbourne Phoenix
- 2024–2025: Goyang Sono Skygunners
- 2025–present: Nagoya Diamond Dolphins

Career highlights
- First-team All-NBA G League (2019); CBA leading rebounder (2016); 2× NCAA rebounding leader (2014, 2015); Big West Player of the Year (2014); 3× First-team All-Big West (2013–2015)
- Stats at NBA.com
- Stats at Basketball Reference

Alan Travis Williams (born January 28, 1993) is an American professional basketball player for the Nagoya Diamond Dolphins of the Japanese B.League. He played college basketball for UC Santa Barbara before beginning his professional career with the Qingdao DoubleStar Eagles of the Chinese Basketball Association in 2015.

== High school career ==
Williams attended North High School. After playing in just one game as a freshman and averaging just 3.5 points as a sophomore, Williams averaged 12.5 points, 10.9 rebounds and 3.3 blocks per game as a junior in 2009–10. As a senior in 2010–11, he averaged 22.1 points, 16.2 rebounds, 4.5 blocks, 2.0 steals, and 1.5 assists, leading North to a Metro Region championship and the Class 5A quarterfinals. He was named Arizona State Player of the Year that season.

== College career ==
Williams played four seasons of college basketball for UC Santa Barbara between 2011 and 2015, finishing his career as the Gauchos' all-time leader in rebounds and second all-time leading scorer. As a junior in 2013–14, he was named the Big West Conference Player of the Year. He also earned first-team All-Big West honors as a sophomore, junior, and senior, and led the NCAA in rebounding as a junior and senior. In 112 games (101 starts) over his four-year career, Williams averaged 15.5 points, 10.0 rebounds, 1.0 assists, 1.0 steals and 1.9 blocks in 27.0 minutes per game.

== Professional career ==
=== 2015 NBA Summer League ===
After going undrafted in the 2015 NBA draft, Williams played for the Charlotte Hornets (three games in Orlando) and Houston Rockets (four games in Las Vegas) during the 2015 NBA Summer League. For his play with the Rockets in Las Vegas, he earned All-NBA Summer League Second Team honors.

=== Qingdao DoubleStar Eagles (2015–2016) ===
On July 25, 2015, Williams signed a one-year deal with the Qingdao DoubleStar Eagles of the Chinese Basketball Association. He appeared in 35 of the team's 38 games during the 2015–16 season, as the Eagles missed a playoff berth with a 16–22 win–loss record. Over those 35 games, he averaged 20.8 points, a league-leading 15.4 rebounds, 2.1 assists, 1.3 steals and 1.6 blocks per game.

=== Phoenix Suns (2016–2018) ===
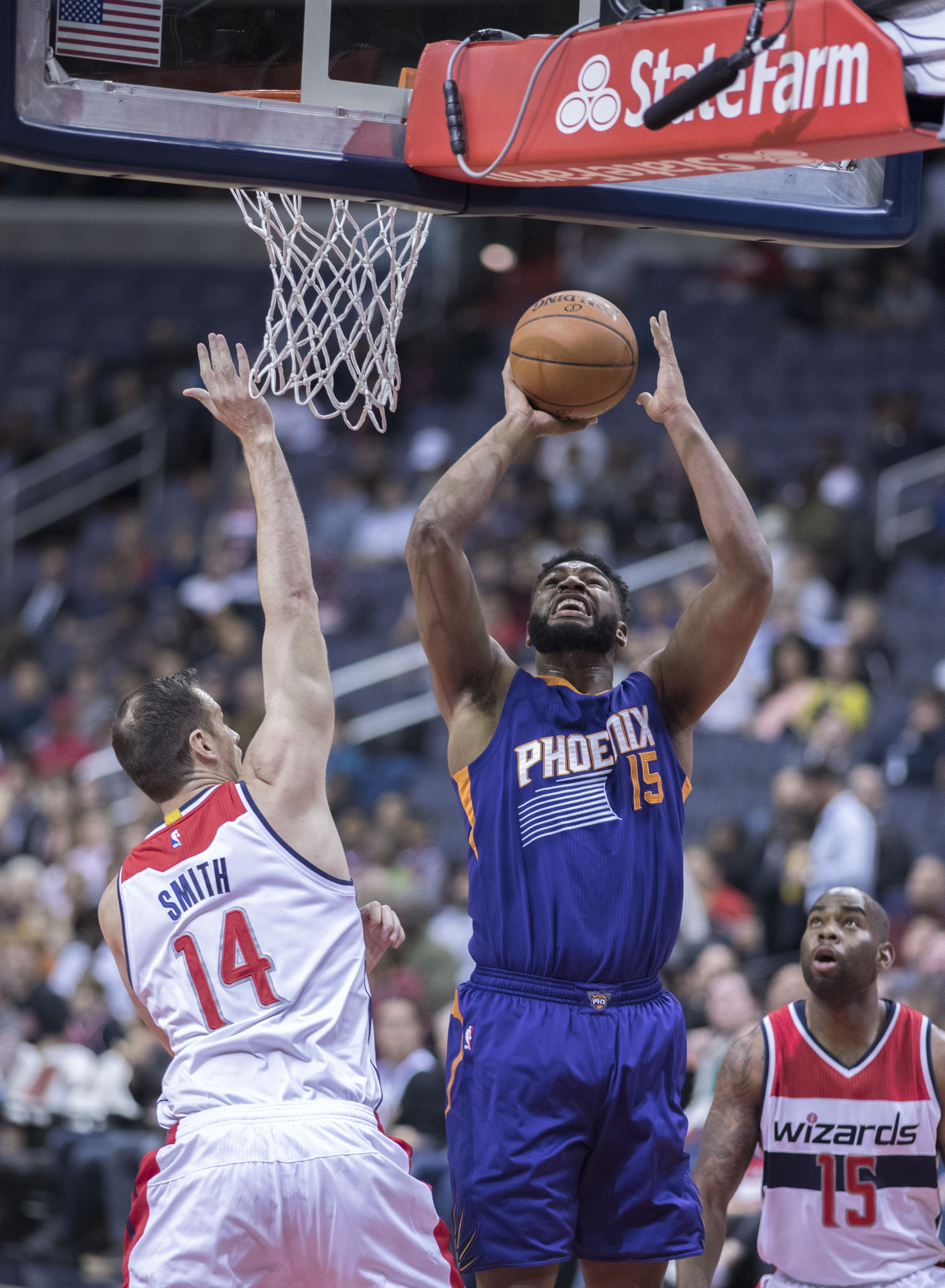
Williams playing for the Suns in 2016

On March 8, 2016, Williams signed a 10-day contract with the Phoenix Suns. He made his NBA debut on March 17 during a 103–69 loss to the Utah Jazz, recording one point and one steal in two minutes. The following day, he signed a multi-year deal with the Suns. On April 9, he recorded a then season-high seven rebounds in a 121–100 win over the New Orleans Pelicans. In the Suns' season finale on April 13, Williams recorded his first double-double in the NBA with season highs of 14 points and 12 rebounds (alongside 3 blocks) in a 114–105 win over the Los Angeles Clippers.

With the Suns' Summer League team in 2016, Williams was the only player to average a double-double throughout the event, averaging 11.8 points and a league-leading 11.2 rebounds over six games, which earned him All-NBA Summer League First Team honors. On September 1, 2016, his contract for the 2016–17 season was fully guaranteed by the Suns. On November 18, 2016, he had a season-best game with 15 points and 15 rebounds in a 116–96 win over the Indiana Pacers. On December 14, he was assigned to the Northern Arizona Suns of the NBA Development League. He was recalled the next day. On February 10, 2017, he had 14 points and 11 rebounds to go with a season-high four blocks in a 115–97 win over the Chicago Bulls. With Tyson Chandler sustaining an injury early in the game and Alex Len missing the game with a suspension, Williams made the most of his 24 minutes on the court. On February 24, 2017, he scored a then season-high 16 points on 8-of-9 shooting in 15 minutes off the bench in a 128–121 overtime loss to the Chicago Bulls. Two days later, he scored a career-high 17 points and tied his career high with 15 rebounds in a 100–96 loss to the Milwaukee Bucks, becoming just the 10th NBA player with multiple 15/15 games in his first 35 career games in the past 19 seasons. On March 5, Williams had 11 points and matched his career best with 15 rebounds in a 109–106 win over the Boston Celtics. On March 9, he had 16 points and 10 rebounds for his fifth straight double-double off the bench in a 122–110 loss to the Los Angeles Lakers. He became the first player in Suns history with five straight double-doubles off the bench. On April 5, 2017, he scored 16 and grabbed a career-best 17 rebounds in a 120–111 loss to the Golden State Warriors.

On July 26, 2017, Williams re-signed with the Suns to a multi-year contract. On September 25, 2017, he was ruled out for six months after undergoing a meniscus repair of his right knee. On March 15, 2018, he was assigned to the Northern Arizona Suns. He was recalled on March 16, reassigned on March 20, and recalled again on March 25. On March 26, he made his season debut for Phoenix against the Boston Celtics. In 16 minutes off the bench, he recorded three points and five rebounds in a 102–94 loss.

On July 2, 2018, Williams was waived by the Suns.

=== Brooklyn/Long Island Nets (2018–2019) ===
On September 24, 2018, Williams signed a two-way contract with the Brooklyn Nets. Under the terms of the deal, he split his time between Brooklyn and their NBA G League affiliate, the Long Island Nets. He was waived by Brooklyn on January 2, 2019, but was then re-signed to another two-way contract on January 11. He made his NBA debut that night and remained with the team for the rest of the 2018–19 season.

=== Shaanxi Xinda (2019) ===
In July and August 2019, Williams played with Shaanxi Xinda of the Chinese NBL.

=== Lokomotiv Kuban (2019–2022) ===
On August 13, 2019, Williams signed with Lokomotiv Kuban of the VTB United League for the 2019–20 season.

On June 4, 2020, Williams re-signed with Lokomotiv Kuban for the 2020–21 season. In November 2020, he was ruled out for the rest of the season with a knee injury.

Williams returned to Lokomotiv Kuban for the 2021–22 season but left the team in March 2022.

=== S.E. Melbourne Phoenix (2022–2023) ===
On August 5, 2022, Williams signed with the South East Melbourne Phoenix in Australia for the 2022–23 NBL season. He led the league in rebounding with 9.6 per game.

=== Nagoya Diamond Dolphins (2023) ===
Following the NBL season, he joined the Nagoya Diamond Dolphins of the Japanese B.League.

=== S.E. Melbourne Phoenix (2023–2024) ===
Williams returned to the Phoenix for the 2023–24 NBL season on a two-year deal, but missed the start of the season with a knee injury. He went on to average a league-leading 10.9 rebounds per game before being ruled out for the rest of the season on January 19, 2024, with another knee injury. On March 7, 2024, it was announced that Williams and the Phoenix agreed to mutually terminate his remaining contract.

=== Goyang Sono Skygunners (2024–2025) ===
On June 12, 2024, Williams signed with the Goyang Sono Skygunners of the Korean Basketball League. His contract would expire on December 22, replacing by Alpha Kaba. On February 12, 2025, Williams re-signed with the Goyang Sono Skygunners to replace Alpha Kaba.

=== Second stint with Nagoya Diamond Dolphins (2025–present) ===
On May 29, 2025, Williams signed with the Nagoya Diamond Dolphins of the Japanese B.League.

== Personal life ==
Williams' father, Cody Sr., is a Justice of the Peace for Maricopa County. He served on the Phoenix City Council from 1994 to 2002. while his mother, Jeri, is the former Chief of Police in Phoenix. His younger brother, Coady Jr., also attended college in Santa Barbara.

== Career statistics ==
Legend
GP	Games played	GS	Games started	MPG	Minutes per game
FG%	Field goal percentage	3P%	3-point field goal percentage	FT%	Free throw percentage
RPG	Rebounds per game	APG	Assists per game	SPG	Steals per game
BPG	Blocks per game	PPG	Points per game	**Bold**	Career high

=== College ===
Year	Team	GP	GS	MPG	FG%	3P%	FT%	RPG	APG	SPG	BPG	PPG
2011–12	UCSB	**30**	19	17.1	.510	.00	.595	6.5	.5	.5	1.3	6.9
2012–13	UCSB	28	**28**	28.3	.469	-	.724	10.7	0.9	1.0	2.3	17.1
2013–14	UCSB	28	**28**	31.1	**.533**	-	.685	11.5	1.2	**1.2**	**2.4**	**21.3**
2014–15	UCSB	26	26	**32.6**	.458	-	**.768**	**11.8**	**1.7**	**1.2**	1.8	17.3
Career		112	101	27.0	.492	.00	.706	10.0	1.0	1.0	1.9	15.5

=== CBA ===
Year	Team	GP	GS	MPG	FG%	3P%	FT%	RPG	APG	SPG	BPG	PPG
2015-16	Eagles	35	-	29.5	.505	.000	.675	15.4	2.1	1.3	1.6	20.8
Career		67	0	13.0	.506	.000	.626	5.5	.6	.6	.6	6.2

=== NBA ===
==== NBA ====
Year	Team	GP	GS	MPG	FG%	3P%	FT%	RPG	APG	SPG	BPG	PPG
2015–16	Phoenix	10	0	6.8	.417	.000	.643	3.8	.5	.4	.5	2.9
2016–17	Phoenix	**47**	0	**15.1**	.517	.000	.625	**6.2**	.5	.6	**.7**	**7.4**
2017–18	Phoenix	5	0	14.0	.389	.000	**.667**	4.4	**1.6**	**1.0**	.2	4.0
2018–19	Brooklyn	5	0	5.2	**.615**	.000	.500	3.8	.6	.2	.0	3.6
Career		67	0	13.0	.506	.000	.626	5.5	.6	.6	.6	6.2

==== NBA minor league ====
Year	Team	GP	GS	MPG	FG%	3P%	FT%	RPG	APG	SPG	BPG	PPG
2016–17	NAS	1	1	20	50.0	-	.750	9	2	1.0	-	20
2017–18	NAS	3	3	16	46.8	-	.571	9.3	2.3	1.0	2.0	16
2018–19	LIN	41	40	19.8	48.0	.400	.777	12.9	2.4	0.7	0.9	19.8
Career		45	44	19.6	48.0	.400	.770	12.6	2.3	0.7	0.9	19.6

=== VTB ===
==== VTB ====
Year	Team	GP	GS	MPG	FG%	3P%	FT%	RPG	APG	SPG	BPG	PPG
2019-20	Loko	19	9	24.2	.489	.0	.700	10.1	2.1	0.8	1.1	11.2
2020-21	Loko	7	7	34.2	.596	.0	.725	13.1	1.9	1.6	1.6	22.1
2021-22	Loko	4	2	25.3	.489	1.0	.600	8.8	1.5	0.5	0.3	9.8
Career		30	18	26.7	.526	.500	.702	10.6	1.9	1.0	1.1	13.6

==== EuroCup ====
Year	Team	GP	GS	MPG	FG%	3P%	FT%	RPG	APG	SPG	BPG	PPG	PIR
2019–20	Loko	10	3	22.1	.493	.0	.718	9.4	1.9	.7	.3	9.4	15.8
2020–21	Loko	8	8	27.3	.495	.0	.619	12.5	2.1	1.0	0.9	14.5	16.9
2021–22	Loko	9	3	19.9	.414	.333	.613	7.1	1.7	1.2	0.3	7.6	10.4
Career		27	14	13.0	.470	.333	.652	9.6	1.9	1.0	0.7	10.3	43.1

=== NBL ===
Year	Team	GP	GS	MPG	FG%	3P%	FT%	RPG	APG	SPG	BPG	PPG
2022–23	SEM	28	-	25.3	.543	.125	.787	9.8	1.8	1.0	0.5	16.6
2023–24	SEM	15	-	25.2	.431	.294	.597	10.9	2.5	0.8	0.9	16.7
Career		43	-	25.2	.507	.240	.728	10.2	2.1	0.9	0.7	16.6

=== B.League ===
Year	Team	GP	GS	MPG	FG%	3P%	FT%	RPG	APG	SPG	BPG	PPG
2022–23	Nagoya D	19	6	24.0	.447	.20	.709	10.7	2.5	1.2	.8	14.5
2025–26	Nagoya D	12	0	18.6	.458	1	.644	4.4	1	.6	.5	6.2
Career (～2022-2023)		19	6	24.0	.447	.20	.709	10.7	2.5	1.2	.8	14.5

=== KBL ===
Year	Team	GP	GS	MPG	FG%	3P%	FT%	RPG	APG	SPG	BPG	PPG
2024–25	SONO	30	-	27.7	.452	.10	.718	11.0	3.3	1.1	.5	15.8
Career		30	-	27.7	.452	.10	.718	11.0	3.3	1.1	.5	15.8
