= Cody Toppert =

American basketball player (born 1983)

Washington Wizards
- Title: Assistant coach
- League: NBA

Personal information
- Born: January 10, 1983 (age 43) Albuquerque, New Mexico, U.S.
- Listed height: 6 ft 4 in (1.93 m)
- Listed weight: 202 lb (92 kg)

Career information
- High school: Albuquerque Academy (Albuquerque, New Mexico)
- College: Cornell (2001–2005)
- NBA draft: 2005: undrafted
- Playing career: 2005–2012
- Position: Shooting guard
- Coaching career: 2008–present

Career history

Playing
- 2005–2006: Albuquerque Thunderbirds
- 2006: Taranaki Mountainairs
- 2006–2007: FC Barreirense
- 2007–2008: CSKA Sofia
- 2008: Great Falls Explorers
- 2009–2010: BG Göttingen
- 2009–2010: Plymouth Raiders
- 2009–2011: Fulgor Libertas Forlì
- 2011–2012: Ourense Baloncesto
- 2012: Bàsquet Mallorca

Coaching
- 2008–2009: Scottsdale Christian Academy (assistant)
- 2015–2017: Rio Grande Valley Vipers (assistant)
- 2017–2018: Northern Arizona Suns
- 2018–2019: Phoenix Suns (assistant)
- 2019–2022: Memphis (assistant)
- 2022–2023: LSU (assistant)
- 2023–2026: Capital City Go-Go
- 2026–present: Washington Wizards (assistant)

Career highlights
- As player: NBA D-League champion (2006)

Cody Arlyn Toppert (born January 10, 1983) is an American basketball coach and former player. He currently serves as an assistant coach for the Washington Wizards of the National Basketball Association (NBA).

== High school career ==
Toppert was born in Albuquerque, New Mexico, and attended the Albuquerque Academy (1998–2001), where he was a two-time USA Today All-American. He was named New Mexico's 2001 Player of the Year, while earning first team all-city, district, and state honors, while twice being named the District Most Valuable Player. During his varsity career, Toppert was invited to play in the Adidas ABCD Camp and was named the top shooting guard at the Five-Star Basketball Camp. Toppert's father, Bob, mother, Linda, and brother, Chad, all played basketball for the University of New Mexico in Albuquerque.

== College career ==
Toppert went on to star at Cornell University (2001–2005) where he was a four-year starter under coach Steve Donahue. He finished his college career as 9th all-time at Cornell in career scoring with 1,232 points, first in career three-pointers made (237), and second in all-time games played (108). Toppert is sixth in Ivy League history in total three-point field goals made.

== Professional career ==
Upon graduation in 2005, Toppert became the first ever player allocated to the NBDL's Albuquerque Thunderbirds, coached by former NBA Defensive Player of the Year, Michael Cooper. In his first season, Toppert helped guide the Thunderbirds to their first ever D-League championship. Following his success, Toppert chose to play overseas, where he played in New Zealand for the Taranaki Mountainairs, leading the league in scoring at 22.1 points per game. He then moved on to Europe, playing in Portugal for FC Barreirense, where he averaged 12.2 points, 3.2 rebounds, and 1.5 steals per game, carrying his club to their first ever appearance in the Cup of Portugal's final four. Toppert also led the organization to its first ever appearance in the final eight of the Taca De Liga Cofidis.

Toppert played the 2007–08 season for the Great Falls Explorers of the CBA under former NBA All-Star Scott Wedman. He averaged 16ppg, 3rpg, 3apg and 1.5spg, and was three times named to the honor roll for CBA Player of the Week. In 2009, he was signed by MEG Göttingen of the German Basketball Bundesliga. In 2010 Toppert moved to BC Wiessenhorn, where he averaged 19 points per game, 6.5 rebounds and 2 assists. In summer 2010, he signed for Plymouth Raiders of the British Basketball League.

After one year in England, Toppert signed for Fulgor Libertas Forli of Italy before moving to Spain with Club Ourense Baloncesto. He would go on to complete his career with Basquet Mallorca Bàsquet Mallorca of LEB Oro, Spanish second division.

== Coaching career ==
After retiring, Toppert spent two years as the Director of Basketball Development and coach for ELEV|8 Sports Institute in Delray Beach, Fla., where during the offseason he also trained players preparing for the NBA Pre Draft and international play. Additionally, he coached at numerous camps and clinics across the country, including the NBA Pre Draft Combine in 2013 and 2014. For a brief period, Toppert was an assistant coach at Scottsdale Christian Academy. While at ELEV8, Toppert amassed a 101–19 record in 3 seasons.

On October 14, 2015, Toppert was hired by the Rio Grande Valley Vipers as an assistant coach.

On November 2, 2017, Toppert was named head coach of the Northern Arizona Suns, shortly before the start of their first season in the NBA G League. In his official G League coaching debut, the Suns lost to the Agua Caliente Clippers, 126–118. However, during his tenure, he managed to have five Northern Arizona Suns players the chance to enter the NBA (again), three of which being promotions to the Phoenix Suns. Northern Arizona also made 14.9 three-pointers per game under Toppert, which led the league and would rank 1st in NBA History.

After leading the G-League in NBA call-ups in his first season with Northern Arizona, he was promoted to an assistant coaching position with the Phoenix Suns. However, after putting up a 19–63 record up in Phoenix under head coach Igor Kokoškov, Igor Kokoškov was let go, leading Toppert to accept a position on the staff of Penny Hardaway at the University of Memphis. Coach Toppert has worked with 3 NBA All-Stars, 12 players selected in the NBA Draft and developed the 3 of the 4 highest paid undrafted players in NBA History.

On June 10, 2019, Toppert was added as an assistant coach on the Memphis Tigers men's basketball team, replacing Sam Mitchell on head coach Penny Hardaway's staff. The Tigers finished 1st in Opponent FG% on defense, and Toppert supervised the development of James Wiseman and Precious Achiuwa. Toppert supervised and tracked their performance using LUCEO's Sports PD App, which he helped develop in his time with the Suns. Toppert has also created and managed the Tigers analytics program, which is considered to be among the most advanced in college basketball. On November 23, 2021, Toppert was selected to the Athletic's 40 under 40 list of rising stars in college basketball. The 2022 Tigers advanced to the second round of the NCAA tournament falling to Gonzaga.

In April 2022, Toppert was announced as an addition to Matt McMahon's staff at LSU.

On June 26, 2020, Toppert was announced as the head coach of Eberlein Drive in The Basketball Tournament 2020.

=== Capital City Go-Go ===
On September 21, 2023, Toppert became the head coach of the Capital City Go-Go of the NBA G League.

==== 2023–24 season ====
In his first season, Toppert led the Go-Go to a regular season record of 20–14. This tied the franchise record for wins in a season at the time and secured a fourth-place finish in the Eastern Conference, marking their third consecutive postseason appearance. Overall the team won 29 games a then franchise best.

==== 2024–25 season ====
Toppert replicated his success in his second season as head coach. The team once again finished with a regular season record of 20–14, tying the previous season's record and once more earning a spot in the playoffs, this time finishing with a franchise best 31 wins.

Toppert's coaching has consistently produced strong results in terms of wins and player development, with the Go-Go making the playoffs in both of his seasons as head coach. His teams have consistently been among the G League's best in offensive and defensive ratings, and seven players from his Go-Go teams have earned NBA call-ups.

=== Washington Wizards ===
On July 6, 2026, Toppert was added to Brian Keefe's coaching staff on the Washington Wizards under the role of assistant coach.
