= Bret Burchard =

American basketball player and coach

Salt Lake City Stars
- Position: Assistant coach
- League: NBA G League

Personal information
- Born: Columbia, Missouri

Career information
- College: Taylor University
- Coaching career: 2008–present

Career history

Coaching
- 2008–2010: Taylor University (assistant)
- 2016–2017: Northern Arizona Suns (assistant)
- 2017: Northern Arizona Suns (associate)
- 2017–2018: Phoenix Suns (assistant)
- 2018–2020: Northern Arizona Suns
- 2023–present: Salt Lake City Stars (assistant)

Bret Burchard is an American former basketball player currently working as an assistant coach for the Salt Lake City Stars of the NBA G League. He attended Taylor University.

== Coaching career ==
Buchard began his coaching career as an assistant coach for his college, Taylor University.

In 2010, he began working for the Phoenix Suns organization. Burchard was originally a part of the inaugural season's coaching staff for the Northern Arizona Suns NBA G League team. Early in the 2017–18 season, Burchard was named an associate head coach for the Northern Arizona squad. However, during the middle of that same season, he was promoted to the Phoenix Suns as a player development assistant coach after the firing of the original coaching staff held together under former coach Earl Watson at the time.

On July 25, 2018, he was named the head coach of the Northern Arizona Suns, the NBA G League affiliate of the Phoenix Suns, after serving as an assistant coach for Phoenix the previous season.

On June 19, 2019, the Suns announced that he would return as the head coach for the 2019–20 season.

On September 20, 2023, Burchard joined the Salt Lake City Stars of the NBA G League as an assistant coach.

== Personal life ==
Brett's father is Bob Burchard, the recently retired head coach at Columbia College in Missouri. He served as the head coach for 31 years.
