= Nate Bjorkgren =

American basketball coach (born 1975)

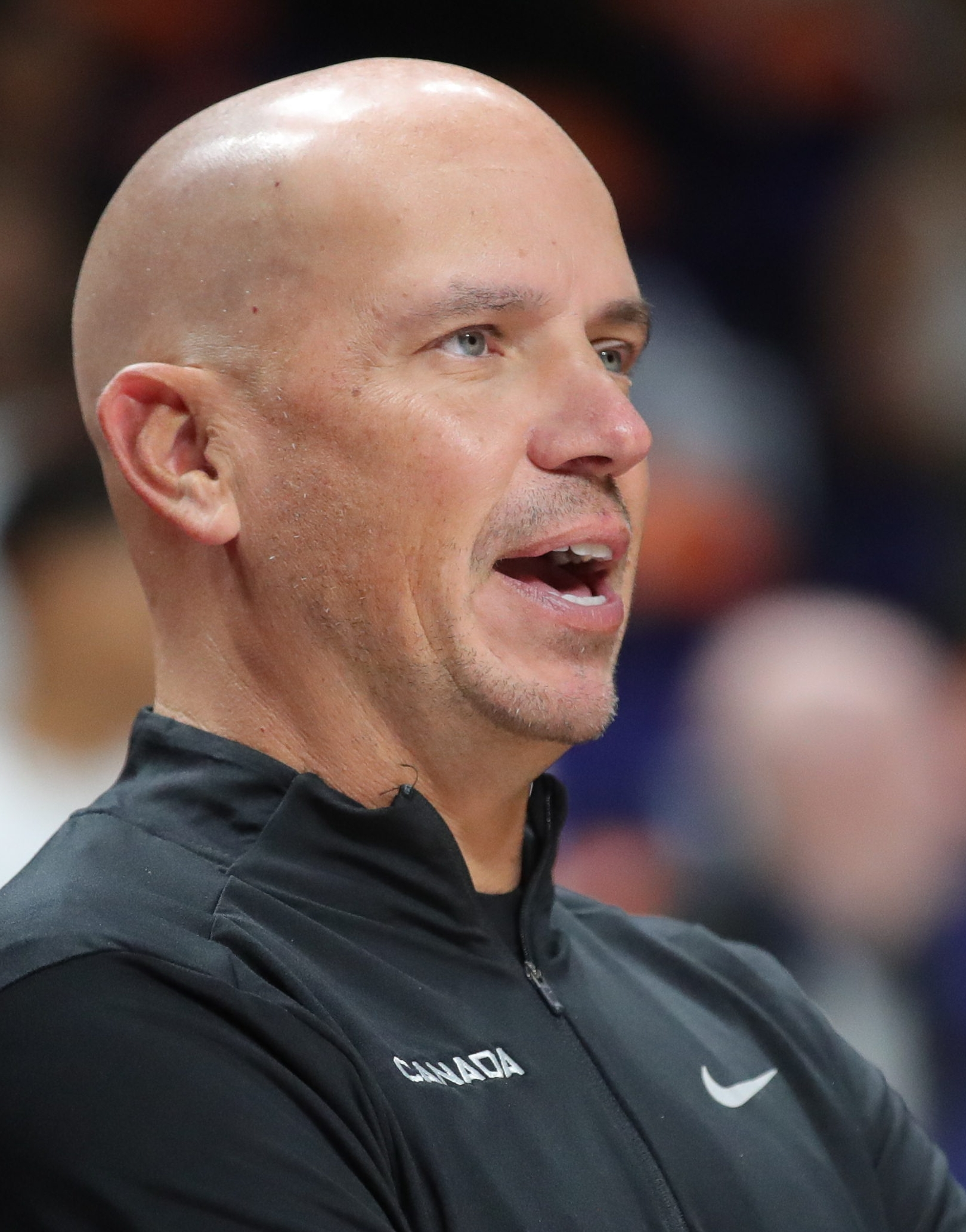

Portland Trail Blazers
- Position: Assistant coach
- League: NBA

Personal information
- Born: June 20, 1975 (age 51) Storm Lake, Iowa, U.S.

Career information
- High school: Storm Lake (Storm Lake, Iowa)
- College: South Dakota (1994–1996); Buena Vista (1996–1998)
- Coaching career: 2004–present

Career history

Coaching
- 2004–2007: Cactus Shadows HS
- 2007–2011: Iowa Energy (assistant)
- 2011–2013: Dakota Wizards / Santa Cruz Warriors
- 2013–2014: Iowa Energy
- 2014–2015: Bakersfield Jam
- 2015–2017: Phoenix Suns (assistant)
- 2018–2020: Toronto Raptors (assistant)
- 2020–2021: Indiana Pacers
- 2021–2023: Toronto Raptors (assistant)
- 2023–2024: Portland Trail Blazers (special assistant)
- 2024-present: Portland Trail Blazers (assistant)

Career highlights
- As assistant coach: NBA champion (2019); NBA D-League champion (2011)

Nathan Robert Bjorkgren (BEE-ork-Gren; born June 20, 1975) is an American professional basketball coach who is an assistant coach for the Portland Trail Blazers of the National Basketball Association (NBA). He played college basketball for the University of South Dakota and Buena Vista University. He was previously an assistant coach for the Phoenix Suns from 2015 to 2017 and the Toronto Raptors from 2018 to 2020. He was the head coach of the Indiana Pacers for the 2020–2021 season.

== Early life and college career ==
Bjorkgren was born in Storm Lake, Iowa on June 20, 1975. Bjorkgren led the Storm Lake High School Tornadoes Basketball team to a 17–4 season as a senior in 1993. When Bjorkgren started playing basketball in college, he first began by playing for South Dakota in 1994. After a couple of seasons playing there, he decided to transfer to Buena Vista University in his hometown. During his time there, Bjorkgren helped Buena Vista out in gaining the Iowa Intercollegiate Athletic Conference Championship in their 1996–97 season under first-year Head Coach Brian Van Haaften. At the time, it was the university's first conference championship earned since 1976. He eventually graduated in 1998 with a degree in Exercise Science.

== High school coaching career ==
Bjorkgren began his high school coaching career at small Sioux Central High School, in Sioux Rapids, Iowa, first as an assistant coach and then a head coach at age 23. He then coached at Linn-Mar High School in Marion, Iowa, under head coach Mark Hutcheson as a head coach of the Sophomore team and assistant to the varsity team until moving to Arizona. Four years after graduating from Buena Vista University, Bjorkgren moved out to Phoenix, Arizona. From 2004 to 2007, Bjorkgren continued his coaching career, this time with Cactus Shadows High School in Cave Creek, Arizona. During each of his three seasons with Cactus Shadows, he led the Falcons to the Cactus 4A State Tournament. In addition, he also was named both the Regional Coach of the Year during the 2004–05 and 2005–06 seasons and the Arizona State High School Coach of the Year for the 2005–06 season.

== Professional coaching career ==
=== D-League ===
After his third and final season at Cactus Shadows High School, Bjorkgren was called up in 2007 for an assistant coach role under Nick Nurse's coaching staff for a new expansion D-League team with his home state's Iowa Energy. During his last season as assistant coach for Iowa, Bjorkgren made his coaching debut in the D-League under an overtime victory for the Energy. Under his last season as assistant coach for the Energy, the team won their first ever D-League championship with his assistance at hand. That led to the Dakota Wizards to call upon Bjorkgren's service as the team's new head coach. During the Wizards' last season under the Dakota name, he coached the team to an improved 29–21 record after having a 19–31 record the previous season before losing in the first round to the Bakersfield Jam. After that, the Dakota Wizards changed their name to the Santa Cruz Warriors due to the Golden State Warriors gaining complete control over the franchise by that point. Under their first season with the Warriors name, Bjorkgren improved the team even further, managing the team to the point where they made it to their first D-League Finals as the Warriors, before eventually losing to the Rio Grande Valley Vipers 2–0. Before trying again with the Warriors, Bjorkgren signed a new deal to return to the Iowa Energy as their head coach. In his only season there, Bjorkgren improved the Energy from a 14–36 record to a more improved 31–19 record, which helped him gain recognition by scouts as a potential NBA head coach someday. After losing out to the Rio Grande Valley Vipers once again, Bjorkgren signed up to a new deal to coach the Bakersfield Jam. During his only season coaching the Jam, he also improved the team, managing to go from an average 24–26 record to a more improved 34–16 record. While he helped his players earn multiple honors that season, the Jam ultimately lost in the playoffs 2–1 to the Austin Spurs in the first round.

=== NBA ===
On July 30, 2015, Bjorkgren got promoted to the NBA by being named both an assistant coach and the leading player development coordinator for the Phoenix Suns under head coach Jeff Hornacek. Before being officially hired, though, he took on the head coach role for the Phoenix Suns' Summer League team in the 2015 NBA Summer League, where he led the team to a 5–2 record, making it to the Las Vegas Finals before losing to the San Antonio Spurs. Under his debut season, he went from being both an assistant head coach and player development coordinator to a full-time assistant coach after both assistant coaches Jerry Sichting and Mike Longabardi were fired by December 28, 2015. With the coaching staff undermanned and the Suns performing poorly due, at least in part, to injuries involving some of their key players, it ultimately led to Jeff Hornacek being fired by February 1, 2016, after finishing the month of January with a 2–12 record. Bjorkgren was immediately considered a prime candidate to take over the vacant coaching spot before the position was ultimately given to Earl Watson. However, despite performing under one of the worst seasons in franchise history, Bjorkgren continued to remain as a part of Earl Watson's newest coaching staff, being one of only two members of Earl Watson's original staff to remain there after the 2015–16 NBA season ended.

==== Phoenix Suns ====
Bjorkgren also took on the role of the Suns' Summer League coach once again for the 2016 NBA Summer League, this time recording a 4–2 record, with the team missing out on their third Las Vegas Finals showing after losing to the 24th-seeded Minnesota Timberwolves. After his second season with the Suns saw some minor improvements, Bjorkgren was removed from the team alongside player development coaches Mehmet Okur and Jason Fraser on October 22, 2017, after some poor performances led to a 0–3 start for the team's 50th anniversary season.

==== Toronto Raptors ====
He then became a part of the Toronto Raptors under their advanced scouting department for the rest of the season onward. On July 25, 2018, Bjorkgren was hired by the Toronto Raptors as an assistant coach. During his first season with Toronto, Bjorkgren reached the 2019 NBA Finals, where the Raptors bested the Golden State Warriors 4–2 in a best of seven series. He became the first assistant coach to win both an NBA Finals and NBA D-League (now NBA G League) Championship throughout a coaching career, winning both under Nick Nurse as head coach.

==== Indiana Pacers ====
On October 20, 2020, the Indiana Pacers hired Bjorkgren as their new head coach. On June 9, 2021, after only one season as head coach, Bjorkgren was fired when the team missed the playoffs for the first time since the 2014–15 season after their loss against the Washington Wizards in the play-in tournament.

==== Return to Toronto ====
In 2021, Bjorkgren rejoined the Raptors as a consultant. He was let go after the 2022–23 season with the departure of Nick Nurse.

==== Portland Trail Blazers (2023–present) ====
During the 2023–24 NBA season, Bjorkgren joined the Portland Trail Blazers as a Special Assistant to the coaching staff. On June 24, 2024, Bjorkgren was promoted to assistant coach. He served as acting head coach for two games in December 2024 during Chauncey Billups' absence.

== National team career ==
Bjorkgren was an assistant coach for the Canada men's national basketball team under Nick Nurse, until the latter's resignation in 2023. Prior to his departure, Nurse temporarily named Bjorkgren to the position of Associate Head Coach of the national team during 2023 FIBA Basketball World Cup qualification.

Bjorkgren remained as an assistant coach for Team Canada under Nurse's successor, Jordi Fernández. He helped in guiding the team to a bronze medal to at the 2023 FIBA World Cup, losing to Serbia in the semifinals, but defeating the United States in a 127-118 overtime win. He was also present for Canada's campaign at the 2024 Paris Olympics, where Canada lost in the quarterfinals to hosts and eventual finalists France.

== Head coaching record ==
Legend
Regular season	G	Games coached	W	Games won	L	Games lost	W–L %	Win–loss %
Playoffs	PG	Playoff games	PW	Playoff wins	PL	Playoff losses	PW–L %	Playoff win–loss %

Team	Year	G	W	L	W–L%	Finish	PG	PW	PL	PW–L%	Result
Indiana	2020–21	72	34	38	.472	2nd in Central	—	—	—	—	Missed playoffs
Career		72	34	38	.472		—	—	—	—	
