= 2017–18 NBA G League season =

- League: NBA G League
- Sport: Basketball

Draft
- Top draft pick: Eric Stuteville
- Picked by: Northern Arizona Suns

Regular season
- Top seed: Austin Spurs; Westchester Knicks
- Season MVP: Lorenzo Brown (Raptors 905)

Finals
- Champions: Austin Spurs
- Runners-up: Raptors 905
- Finals MVP: Nick Johnson (Austin Spurs)

NBA G League seasons
- ← 2016–17 2018–19 →

The 2017–18 NBA G League season was the 17th season of the NBA G League (formerly the NBA D-League), the minor league for the National Basketball Association (NBA). It was the first season after the league rebranded to become the NBA G League as part of multi-year partnership with Gatorade.

The Austin Spurs won the league title, sweeping Raptors 905 in the NBA G League Finals.

== League changes ==
The league expanded to a record 26 teams from 22 teams during the 2016–17 season. There was one relocation (Erie BayHawks to Lakeland, Florida to become the Lakeland Magic) and four expansion teams introduced this season (the Agua Caliente Clippers, a new Erie BayHawks, the Memphis Hustle, and the Wisconsin Herd), each owned and affiliated with an NBA team. The Iowa Energy were purchased by the Minnesota Timberwolves at the end of the previous season and rebranded as the Iowa Wolves. The Miami Heat purchased the controlling interest in the Sioux Falls Skyforce, their affiliate since 2013. The Los Angeles D-Fenders also relocated to a new facility within El Segundo and were rebranded as the South Bay Lakers. The purchases and expansion of these teams by individual NBA teams left just four NBA teams without a developmental affiliate, down from eight the previous season. It also decreased the number of independently owned D-League/G League teams from seven to four. Meanwhile, the NBA also started using two-way contracts for their team rosters, allowing players to be more easily called up or sent down.

The league retained its Eastern and Western Conferences, but realigned each conference into three divisions each. Along with the league expansion, the league also expanded its playoff field from eight teams to twelve. Each of the division winners and three wild cards per conference qualify. The top two seeds in each conference earn a bye over the first round.

The NBA announced a title sponsorship deal with Gatorade prior to the season, under which it has been renamed the NBA G League. The G League also experimented with new broadcast arrangements, including airing 120 games on Eleven Sports, and streaming games on the typically video game-oriented live streaming service Twitch, which included interactive stats, and commentary provided by prominent Twitch personalities.

== Regular season ==
Finals standings.

x – qualified for playoffs; y – Division champion; z – Conference champion

=== Eastern Conference ===
Atlantic Division

Team (affiliate)	W	L	PCT	GB	Home	Road
z – Westchester Knicks (NYK)	32	18	.640	0	13–12	19–6
x – Raptors 905 (TOR)	31	19	.620	1	18–7	13–12
Long Island Nets (BKN)	27	23	.540	5	14–11	13–12
Maine Red Claws (BOS)	17	33	.340	15	14–11	3–22

Central Division

Team (affiliate)	W	L	PCT	GB	Home	Road
y – Fort Wayne Mad Ants (IND)	29	21	.580	0	19–6	10–15
x – Grand Rapids Drive (DET)	29	21	.580	0	16–9	13–12
Windy City Bulls (CHI)	24	26	.480	5	13–12	11–14
Canton Charge (CLE)	22	28	.440	7	9–16	13–12
Wisconsin Herd (MIL)	21	29	.420	8	8–17	13–12

Southeast Division

Team (affiliate)	W	L	PCT	GB	Home	Road
y – Erie BayHawks (ATL)	28	22	.560	0	15–10	13–12
x – Lakeland Magic (ORL)	28	22	.560	0	15–10	13–12
Greensboro Swarm (CHA)	16	34	.320	12	9–16	7–18
Delaware 87ers (PHI)	16	34	.320	12	6–19	10–15

=== Western Conference ===
Midwest Division

Team (affiliate)	W	L	PCT	GB	Home	Road
y – Oklahoma City Blue (OKC)	28	22	.560	0	15–10	13–12
Sioux Falls Skyforce (MIA)	25	25	.500	3	13–12	12–13
Iowa Wolves (MIN)	24	26	.480	4	14–11	10–15
Memphis Hustle (MEM)	21	29	.420	7	10–15	11–14

Pacific Division

Team (affiliate)	W	L	PCT	GB	Home	Road
y – Reno Bighorns (SAC)	29	21	.580	0	14–11	15–10
x – South Bay Lakers (LAL)	28	22	.560	1	16–9	12–13
Santa Cruz Warriors (GSW)	23	27	.460	6	13–12	10–15
Northern Arizona Suns (PHX)	23	27	.460	6	13–12	10–15
Agua Caliente Clippers (LAC)	23	27	.460	6	14–11	9–16

Southwest Division

Team (affiliate)	W	L	PCT	GB	Home	Road
z – Austin Spurs (SAS)	32	18	.640	0	17–8	15–10
x – Rio Grande Valley Vipers (HOU)	29	21	.580	3	14–11	15–10
x – Texas Legends (DAL)	29	21	.580	3	16–9	13–12
Salt Lake City Stars (UTA)	16	34	.320	16	11–14	5–20

== Playoffs ==
For the fourth time ever and first time since the 2014 playoffs, a team went undefeated in postseason play to win the championship. The Austin Spurs won the G League Finals over Raptors 905 by scores of 105-93 and 98–76 to win the title.

First Round (March 30 & March 31)	Conference Semifinal (April 2 & April 3)
1	Westchester Knicks	80
4	Raptors 905	92
4	Raptors 905	92
5	Grand Rapids Drive	88
Eastern Conference
2	Fort Wayne Mad Ants	116
3	Erie BayHawks	119
3	Erie BayHawks	96
6	Lakeland Magic	90
1	Austin Spurs	117
4	Rio Grande Valley Vipers	91
4	Rio Grande Valley Vipers	107
5	Texas Legends	100
Western Conference
2	Reno Bighorns	109
6	South Bay Lakers	126
3	Oklahoma City Blue	105
6	South Bay Lakers	125

Conference Final (April 5 & April 6)
4	Raptors 905	118
3	Erie BayHawks	106
1	Austin Spurs	104
6	South Bay Lakers	93

Finals (April 8 & April 10); Best-of-three
E4	Raptors 905	0
W1	Austin Spurs	2

=== Finals boxscore ===
April 8, 2018
7:00 p.m. ET

Boxscore

Raptors 905 93, Austin Spurs 105
Scoring by quarter: 23–30, 26–24, 27–27, 17–24
Pts: Lorenzo Brown 20; Rebs: Kennedy Meeks 9 Asts: Lorenzo Brown 10	Pts: Derrick White 35; Rebs: Jaron Blossomgame 11; Asts: Darrun Hilliard 4

H-E-B Center at Cedar Park, Cedar Park, Texas
Attendance: 4,321
Referees:
- #24 Brandon Adair
- #37 Matt Myers
- #48 Vladimir Voyard-Tadal

April 10, 2018
8:00 p.m. ET

Boxscore

Austin Spurs 98, Raptors 905 76
Scoring by quarter: 28–18, 18–20, 27–24, 25–14
Pts: Nick Johnson 17; Rebs: Jaron Blossomgame 10; Asts: Olivier Hanlan 7	Pts: Malcolm Miller, Kaza Kajami-Keane 12; Rebs: Alfonzo McKinnie, Kennedy Meeks 9 Asts: Lorenzo Brown 10
Austin wins series, 2–0

Hershey Centre, Mississauga, Ontario
Attendance: 3,262
Referees:
- #11 Randy Richardson
- #19 Phenizee Ransom
- #35 John Butler

== Statistics ==
=== Individual statistic leaders ===
Category	Player	Team	Statistic
Points per game	Antonio Blakeney	Windy City Bulls	32.0
Rebounds per game	Amile Jefferson	Iowa Wolves	12.9
Assists per game	Josh Magette	Erie BayHawks	10.2
Steals per game	Josh Gray	Northern Arizona Suns	2.4
Blocks per game	Amida Brimah	Austin Spurs	2.6
Turnovers per game	Daniel Hamilton	Oklahoma City Blue	5.0
Fouls per game	Isaiah Hicks	Westchester Knicks	3.9
Minutes per game	Ryan Arcidiacono	Windy City Bulls	39.5
FG%	Damian Jones	Santa Cruz Warriors	67.8%
FT%	Quinn Cook	Santa Cruz Warriors	94.9%
3FG%	Andre Ingram	South Bay Lakers	46.7%
Double-doubles	Amile Jefferson	Iowa Wolves	35
Triple-doubles	Daniel Hamilton	Oklahoma City Blue	9

=== Individual game highs ===
Category	Player	Team	Statistic
Points	Trey Davis	Maine Red Claws	57
Rebounds	Devin Williams	Maine Red Claws	23
Assists	Josh Magette	Erie BayHawks	19
Steals	Tra-Deon Hollins	Fort Wayne Mad Ants	10
Blocks	Jimmie Taylor	Sioux Falls Skyforce	11
Three-pointers	Milton Doyle	Long Island Nets	11

=== Team statistic leaders ===
Category	Team	Statistic
Points per game	Rio Grande Valley Vipers	120.5
Rebounds per game	South Bay Lakers	47.0
Assists per game	Rio Grande Valley Vipers	26.3
Steals per game	Rio Grande Valley Vipers	10.6
Blocks per game	Austin Spurs	6.6
Turnovers per game	Rio Grande Valley Vipers	18.5
FG%	Santa Cruz Warriors	50.2%
FT%	Austin Spurs	79.8%
3FG%	Memphis Hustle	39.4%
+/−	Raptors 905	+5.0

== Player death ==
On March 24, 2018, Grand Rapids Drive player Zeke Upshaw collapsed on-court during the final minute of the team's regular season finale. Two days later, Upshaw died at the age of 26. Autopsy reports indicated that Upshaw had died from a sudden cardiac arrest. The start of the NBA G League playoffs were delayed out of respect for Upshaw's death, and the NBA's Detroit Pistons gave Upshaw an honorary call-up to their roster.
