= Motor City Cruise =

American minor league basketball team of the NBA G League

- Conference: Eastern
- League: NBA G League
- Founded: 2003
- History: Long Beach Jam; ABA: 2003–2005; Bakersfield Jam; D-League: 2006–2016; Northern Arizona Suns; 2016–2021; Motor City Cruise; 2021–present
- Arena: Wayne State Fieldhouse
- Location: Detroit, Michigan
- Team colors: Royal blue, red, grey, black, white
- President: Durand Walker
- General manager: Max Unger
- Head coach: Steve Scalzi
- Ownership: Detroit Pistons
- Affiliation: Detroit Pistons
- Championships: ABA: 1 (2004); D-League/G League: 0
- Division/conference titles: D-League/G League: 1 (2013)
- Website: Official website

The Motor City Cruise are an American professional basketball team in the NBA G League based in Detroit. They are affiliated with the Detroit Pistons, and play their home games at Wayne State Fieldhouse. The franchise began play as the Long Beach Jam in 2003 under the revived American Basketball Association and moved to Bakersfield in the D-League in 2006 as the Bakersfield Jam. After ten years in Bakersfield, California, the franchise was moved to Prescott Valley, Arizona, in 2016 by the Phoenix Suns and were subsequently renamed the Northern Arizona Suns. In 2021, the team relocated to Detroit after being purchased by the Pistons.

== History ==
=== Long Beach Jam (2003–2005) ===
During the year-long hiatus that the American Basketball Association had in the 2002–03 season, one of the teams the league approved of would be the Long Beach Jam. In the team's inaugural season, the Jam managed to procure NBA Hall of Famer Dennis Rodman, fellow veteran Corey Gaines, up-and-coming player Matt Barnes, and Japanese point guard Yuta Tabuse on their squad. Schea Cotton, played SG/SF after playing years overseas. They also got former NBA Finals winning head coach Paul Westhead during the start of the season, but he managed to procure himself an assistant coach gig with the Orlando Magic after their first game of the season. Nevertheless, with the presence of players like Rodman, Gaines and Tabuse under new head coach Earl Cureton, the Jam would hold a 24–7 record. It was not only considered the best record of the league that season, but also gave the Jam a bye all the way into the Finals, where they competed against the winner of the Kansas City Knights (the previous champions of the ABA) and the Juárez Gallos. In the championship round, the Jam barely escaped against the Knights to win the ABA Championship with a final score of 126–123.

In their second and final season under the Long Beach name, the Jam began their season under a pedestrian 8–6 record with another NBA Hall of Famer, this time Nate "Tiny" Archibald, leading the way as head coach during the first half of the 2004–05 season. On January 17, 2005, Archibald resigned from his position as head coach and had former player and future head coach of the Phoenix Mercury, Corey Gaines, assigned as their new head coach during the second half of their season. In that season, they managed to produce an 18–10 record in a greatly expanded ABA, with Gaines improving the team with a 10-4 second half during that season, which produced them with the second-best record in the Red Division. The Jam competed in the playoffs and made it to the quarterfinals, where they lost 130–115 to the Utah Snowbears (who produced a 25–1 that season), who would surprisingly end up forfeiting their last match to the Bellevue Blackhawks (potentially due to sunk costs with the team) since the Snowbears folded soon afterwards, while Bellevue lost the championship match to the Arkansas RimRockers. After the end of that season, the Jam withdrew from the 2005–06 ABA season to move to the NBA Development League the following season afterward, with the intent to also move to Bakersfield around that same period of time.

=== Bakersfield Jam (2006–2016) ===
After their first season in Bakersfield ended in 2007, there was a contest where the fans could decide on a new name for the team. The choices were to rename the team Desperados, Roughnecks, Oilers, or keep the name Jam. On May 17, the team announced that the team will remain the Bakersfield Jam, as that name won the poll in a landslide vote.

The team played at Rabobank Arena until 2009 and later at the Jam Events Center.

On April 29, 2009, it was reported that the Jam had ceased operations, citing lack of sufficient fan attendance. However, on June 18, the Jam announced that they had not shut down and plan to play in the 2009–10 season, with further details to come the following day.

On April 30, 2014, it was reported that the Jam would enter a hybrid operation with the Phoenix Suns. Not only would that lead to the Suns having exclusive collaborations with the team, but it would also allow the Jam to operate under their own management in the process. On May 9, it was confirmed that the Suns and the Jam would agree to working under a hybrid affiliation. Four days later, the Jam completed their transition by allowing Suns scout Bubba Barrage to be the team's newest general manager and letting Nate Bjorkgren coach the Jam in place of Will Voigt. Since the Dignity Health Event Center seated only 500, the team did not sell individual general admission tickets and were sold to season ticket holders only.

On May 29, 2015, it was announced that Nate Bjorkgren would leave the Jam to take part in the Suns' organization as a leading player development and assistant coach. Three months later, former NBA coach Chris Jent would be the newest head coach for the Jam.

=== Northern Arizona Suns (2016–2021) ===
Northern Arizona Suns logo

On April 12, 2016, the Phoenix Suns announced that the organization had officially purchased the Jam and were relocating the franchise to the town of Prescott Valley, Arizona, for the 2016–17 season and became the Northern Arizona Suns. In response, the previous owners of the Jam franchise, Stan Ellis and David Higdon, announced that they have been working with the D-League in securing a new franchise and affiliation before the 2016–17 season, although it did not come to fruition. On May 2, it was announced that former Arizona Sundogs and current Arizona Rattlers president, Chris Presson, would become the new team president for the Suns. The new team logo and jerseys for Northern Arizona was officially unveiled on May 11 and the front office personnel and coaching staff were announced on August 16. They played their games at the Findlay Toyota Center. During their first season as the Northern Arizona Suns, the team started out the season strong, entering with a 10–1 record. However, the Suns would enter a major losing streak after having Tyler Ulis and Alan Williams briefly play for them via assignment, and would ultimately not recover from it afterward.

In the 2017 offseason, the D-League rebranded as the NBA G League. On October 20, 2017, the Suns had assistant general manager Louis Lehman take over general manager duties for the Northern Arizona Suns, while previous general manager Bubba Barrage remained in Phoenix as director of player personnel. Three days later, head coach Tyrone Ellis became an assistant coach for Phoenix alongside Northern Arizona assistants Bret Burchard and Brandon Rosenthal, leaving assistant coach Tyler Gatlin as the interim head coach during the G League preseason. Cody Toppert was named the head coach just prior to the start of the season. The team finished the season with a 23–27 record and missed the playoffs. At the end of the season, head coach Toppert was promoted to an assistant coaching position in Phoenix. He would be replaced by former Northern Arizona Suns assistant and Phoenix Suns' assistant coach Bret Burchard.

Following the pandemic-shorted 2019–20 season, the Phoenix Suns originally announced that the team would relocate to the metro Phoenix area for the following season. However, the team withdrew entirely from the 2020–21 season amidst the COVID-19 pandemic when the G League held the abbreviated season in a bubble in Orlando, Florida.

=== Motor City Cruise (2021–present) ===
On July 29, 2020, the Detroit Pistons announced that the organization had purchased the Northern Arizona Suns from the Phoenix Suns and were relocating the franchise to Detroit for the 2021–22 season to play at Wayne State Fieldhouse. It was also announced that the team's affiliation with the Grand Rapids Drive would end upon the completion of the 2020–21 season. On October 30, the team name was announced as the Motor City Cruise.

On March 17, 2021, the Cruise announced the hiring of Rob Murphy as president and general manager. Pistons' assistant coach DJ Bakker was named the first head coach for the Cruise on August 23.

On September 10, 2026, Steve Scalzi was revealed at the new head coach.

== Season-by-season record ==
Season	League	Division/Conference	Finish	Wins	Losses	Pct.	Postseason results
Long Beach Jam
2003–04	ABA	—	1st	24	7	.774	Won ABA Championship (Kansas City) 126–123
2004–05	ABA	Red	2nd	18	10	.643	Won ABA Quarterfinals (Las Vegas) 148–126; Lost ABA Semifinals (Utah Snowbears) 115–130
2005–06	Suspended operations for D-League application						
Bakersfield Jam
2006–07	D-League	Western	6th	19	31	.380	
2007–08	D-League	Western	5th	11	39	.220	
2008–09	D-League	Western	3rd	26	24	.520	Lost First Round (Utah) 81–94
2009–10	D-League	Western	8th	17	33	.340	
2010–11	D-League	Western	4th	29	21	.580	Lost First Round (Rio Grande Valley) 1–2
2011–12	D-League	Western	3rd	28	22	.560	Won First Round (Dakota) 2–0; Lost Semifinals (Los Angeles) 0–2
2012–13	D-League	Western	1st	36	14	.720	Lost First Round (Austin) 0–2
2013–14	D-League	Western	5th	24	26	.480	
2014–15	D-League	Western	2nd	34	16	.680	Lost First Round (Austin) 1–2
2015–16	D-League	Pacific	3rd	22	28	.440	
Northern Arizona Suns
2016–17	D-League	Pacific	3rd	22	28	.448	
2017–18	G League	Pacific	4th	23	27	.460	
2018–19	G League	Pacific	5th	12	38	.240	
2019–20	G League	Pacific	5th	8	34	.190	Season cancelled by COVID-19 pandemic
2020–21	G League	Opted out of single-site season					
Motor City Cruise
2021–22	G League	Eastern	2nd	22	10	.688	Lost Conference Semifinal (Delaware) 116–124
2022–23	G League	Eastern	8th	17	15	.531	
2023–24	G League	Eastern	9th	16	18	.471	
2024–25	G League	Eastern	7th	19	15	.559	
ABA regular season				42	17	.712	2003–2005
D/G League regular season				385	439	.467	2006–present
Playoffs				6	11	.353	2003–present
Regular season and Playoffs combined				427	440	.493	2003–present

== Current roster ==
Motor City Cruise roster
Players

Pos.	No.	Player	Height	Weight	DOB	From
F	4	Dawson Garcia	6 ft 9 in (2.06 m)	235 lb (107 kg)	2001-09-20	Marquette
G	–	Elijah Harkless (TW)	6 ft 3 in (1.91 m)	195 lb (88 kg)	2000-02-03	UNLV
F	–	Isaac Jones (TW)	6 ft 8 in (2.03 m)	245 lb (111 kg)	2000-07-11	Washington State
C	34	Ugonna Onyenso (TW)	6 ft 11 in (2.11 m)	225 lb (102 kg)	2004-09-25	Nigeria
C	–	Vianney Salatchoum	6 ft 10 in (2.08 m)	215 lb (98 kg)	2002-02-07	TCU
C	7	O'Mar Stanley	6 ft 8 in (2.03 m)	240 lb (109 kg)	2001-10-02	Boise State
F	9	John Ukomadu	6 ft 7 in (2.01 m)	195 lb (88 kg)	2001-10-30	Eastern Kentucky
G/F	3	Brice Williams	6 ft 5 in (1.96 m)	214 lb (97 kg)	2001-07-05	Nebraska

Coaches
Head coach
- Jamelle McMillan
Assistant(s)
- Marcus Stout (Associate HC)

Legend
- (DP) Unsigned draft pick
- (FA) Free agent
- (S) Suspended
- (P) Prospects
- (NBA) On assignment from NBA affiliate
- (TW) Two-way affiliate player
- Injured

Roster
Updated: July 2, 2026

== Head coaches ==
#	Head coach	Term	Regular season				Playoffs				Achievements
#	Head coach	Term	G	W	L	Win%	G	W	L	Win%	Achievements
1	Paul Westhead	2003	1	1	0	1.000	—	—	—	—	
2	Earl Cureton	2003–2004	30	23	7	.767	1	1	0	1.000	ABA Championship (2004)
3	Nate Archibald	2004–2005	14	8	6	.571	—	—	—	—	
4	Corey Gaines	2005	14	10	4	.714	2	1	1	.500	
5	Jim Harrick	2006–2007	50	19	31	.380	—	—	—	—	
6	Sean Rooks	2007–2008	50	11	39	.220	—	—	—	—	
7	Scott Roth	2008–2009	50	26	24	.520	1	0	1	.000	
8	Will Voigt	2009–2014	250	134	116	.536	9	3	6	.333	
9	Nate Bjorkgren	2014–2015	50	34	16	.680	3	1	2	.333	
10	Chris Jent	2015–2016	50	22	28	.440	—	—	—	—	
11	Tyrone Ellis	2016–2017	50	22	28	.440	—	—	—	—	
12	Cody Toppert	2017–2018	50	23	27	.460	—	—	—	—	
13	Bret Burchard	2018–2020	50	12	38	.240	—	—	—	—	
14	DJ Bakker	2021–2023	64	39	25	.609	2	1	1	.500	
15	Jamelle McMillan	2023–2026	68	35	33	.515	0	0	0	–	
16	Steve Scalzi	2026–present				–	0	0	0	–	

== NBA affiliates ==
=== Bakersfield Jam ===
- Atlanta Hawks (2012–2014)
- Golden State Warriors (2006–2010)
- Los Angeles Clippers (2009–2014)
- Los Angeles Lakers (2010–2011)
- Orlando Magic (2008–2009)
- Phoenix Suns (2011–2016)
- Sacramento Kings (2006–2008)
- Toronto Raptors (2011–2014)
- Utah Jazz (2013–2014)

=== Northern Arizona Suns ===
- Phoenix Suns (2016–2021)

=== Motor City Cruise ===
- Detroit Pistons (2021–present)
