= 2001 National Basketball Development League supplemental draft =

The 2001 NBDL Supplemental Draft was a supplemental draft for the newly formed National Basketball Association Development League (abbreviated NBDL from 2001 through 2004, then NBADL since 2005). It was held on November 3, 2001, before the league's inaugural 2001–02 season, and took place two days after the 2001 NBDL Draft. The supplemental draft was a one-time occurrence designed to fill out the league's rosters and to ensure competitive play. In this draft, all eight of the league's charter teams took turns selecting available recent college graduates, semi-professional and/or professional players. The draft consisted of four rounds of eight selections each, but there were five instances of a team passing on their draft selection. In all, 27 players were drafted out of 32 possible selections; the Huntsville Flight and Fayetteville Patriots passed on two players apiece, while the Columbus Riverdragons passed on one.

Lorenzo Coleman, a 7 ft 1 in (2.16 m) center who graduated from Tennessee Tech in 1998, was the first overall selection. Nearly half (11) of the 27 players selected in the supplemental draft were also chosen in an NBA draft. Among them, Kaniel Dickens later became an NBA Development League All-Star after the annual contest began in 2007. No other players in the NBDL Supplemental Draft were ever selected as D-League All-Stars. The oldest player taken in the 2001 NBDL Supplemental Draft was Dwayne Schintzius, who had graduated from Florida in 1990 and was 33 years old on draft day. Schintzius had spent the 1990s playing in the NBA for six different teams before ending up in the D-League. The D-League's first-season MVP was Ansu Sesay, who had been selected 14th overall in the Supplemental Draft by the Greenville Groove.

There were two schools that had two different players drafted. Florida's Schintzius and Brent Wright were selected 18th and 22nd overall, respectively, while Charlotte had Kelvin Price and Galen Young go 7th and 19th overall, respectively.

== Key ==
Pos.	G	F	C
Position	Guard	Forward	Center

^	Denotes player who has been selected to (an) NBA Development League All-Star Game(s)
*	Denotes player who has been selected to (an) NBA Development League All-Star Game(s) and was also selected in an NBA draft
†	Denotes player who was also selected in an NBA Draft

== Draft ==
Round	Pick	Player	Position	Nationality	Team	College	Year graduated
1	1	Lorenzo Coleman	C	United States	Roanoke Dazzle	Tennessee Tech	1998
1	2	Derek Hood	F	United States	Mobile Revelers	Arkansas	1999
1	3	Makhtar N'Diaye	C	Senegal	North Charleston Lowgators	North Carolina	1998
1	4	Kendric Johnson	G	United States	Asheville Altitude	San Jose State	1999
1	5	Tremaine Fowlkes^{†}	G/F	United States	Columbus Riverdragons	Fresno State	1997
1	6	Eric Chenowith^{†}	C	United States	Greenville Groove	Kansas	2001
1	7	Kelvin Price	F	United States	Huntsville Flight	Charlotte	1999
1	8	Kaniel Dickens*	G/F	United States	Fayetteville Patriots	Idaho	2000
2	9	Dan Earl	G	United States	Roanoke Dazzle	Penn State	2000
2	10	Isaac Fontaine	G	United States	Mobile Revelers	Washington State	1997
2	11	Chris Robinson^{†}	G/F	United States	North Charleston Lowgators	Western Kentucky	1996
2	12	Paul Grant^{†}	C	United States	Asheville Altitude	Wisconsin	1997
2	13	Chris Garner	G	United States	Columbus Riverdragons	Memphis	1997
2	14	Ansu Sesay^{†}	F/C	United States	Greenville Groove	Mississippi	1998
2	15	Shelly Clark	F	United States	Huntsville Flight	Illinois	1995
2	16	Bryan Bracey^{†}	G/F	United States	Fayetteville Patriots	Oregon	2001
3	17	Ricky Moore	G	United States	Roanoke Dazzle	Connecticut	1999
3	18	Dwayne Schintzius^{†}	C	United States	Mobile Revelers	Florida	1990
3	19	Galen Young^{†}	F	United States	North Charleston Lowgators	Charlotte	1999
3	20	Maurice Jeffers^{†}	G	United States	Asheville Altitude	Saint Louis	2001
3	21	Stais Boseman	G	United States	Columbus Riverdragons	Southern California	1997
3	22	Brent Wright	F	United States	Greenville Groove	Florida	2000
3	23	Passed	—	—	Huntsville Flight	—	—
3	24	Passed	—	—	Fayetteville Patriots	—	—
4	25	Thomas Hamilton	C	United States	Roanoke Dazzle	Pittsburgh	1994
4	26	Vernon Jennings	G	United States	Mobile Revelers	Miami (FL)	2000
4	27	Paul McPherson	G	United States	North Charleston Lowgators	DePaul	1999
4	28	Jimmy King^{†}	G/F	United States	Asheville Altitude	Michigan	1995
4	29	Passed	—	—	Columbus Riverdragons	—	—
4	30	Darnell Hoskins	F	United States	Greenville Groove	Dayton	1997
4	31	Passed	—	—	Huntsville Flight	—	—
4	32	Passed	—	—	Fayetteville Patriots	—	—
