= All-NBA G League Team =

American basketball honor

The All-NBA G League Team is an annual NBA G League (G League) honor bestowed on the best players in the league following every G League season. The voting is conducted by the league's head coaches. The team has been selected in every season of the league's existence, dating back to its inaugural season in 2001–02. The All-NBA Development League Team is composed of three five-man lineups—a first, second, and third team, typically comprising a total of 15 roster spots. The All-NBA Development League Team originally had two teams, but was expanded to three teams in 2007–08.

Players receive five points for a first team vote, three points for a second team vote, and one point for a third team vote. The five players with the highest point totals make the first team, with the next five making the second team and so forth. In the case of a tie at the fifth position of any team, the roster is expanded. If the first team consists of six players due to a tie, the second team will still consist of five players with the potential for more expansion in the event of additional ties. Omar Cook, Will Conroy, Blake Ahearn, Jerel McNeal, Quinn Cook, Johnathan Motley, Justin Anderson, Mason Jones, and Mac McClung hold the record for the most total selections with three apiece.

== Selections ==
	Indicates the player who won the NBA G League Most Valuable Player in the same year
Player (X)	Denotes the number of times the player has been selected to any all-league team at that point

=== 2001–02 to 2006–07 ===
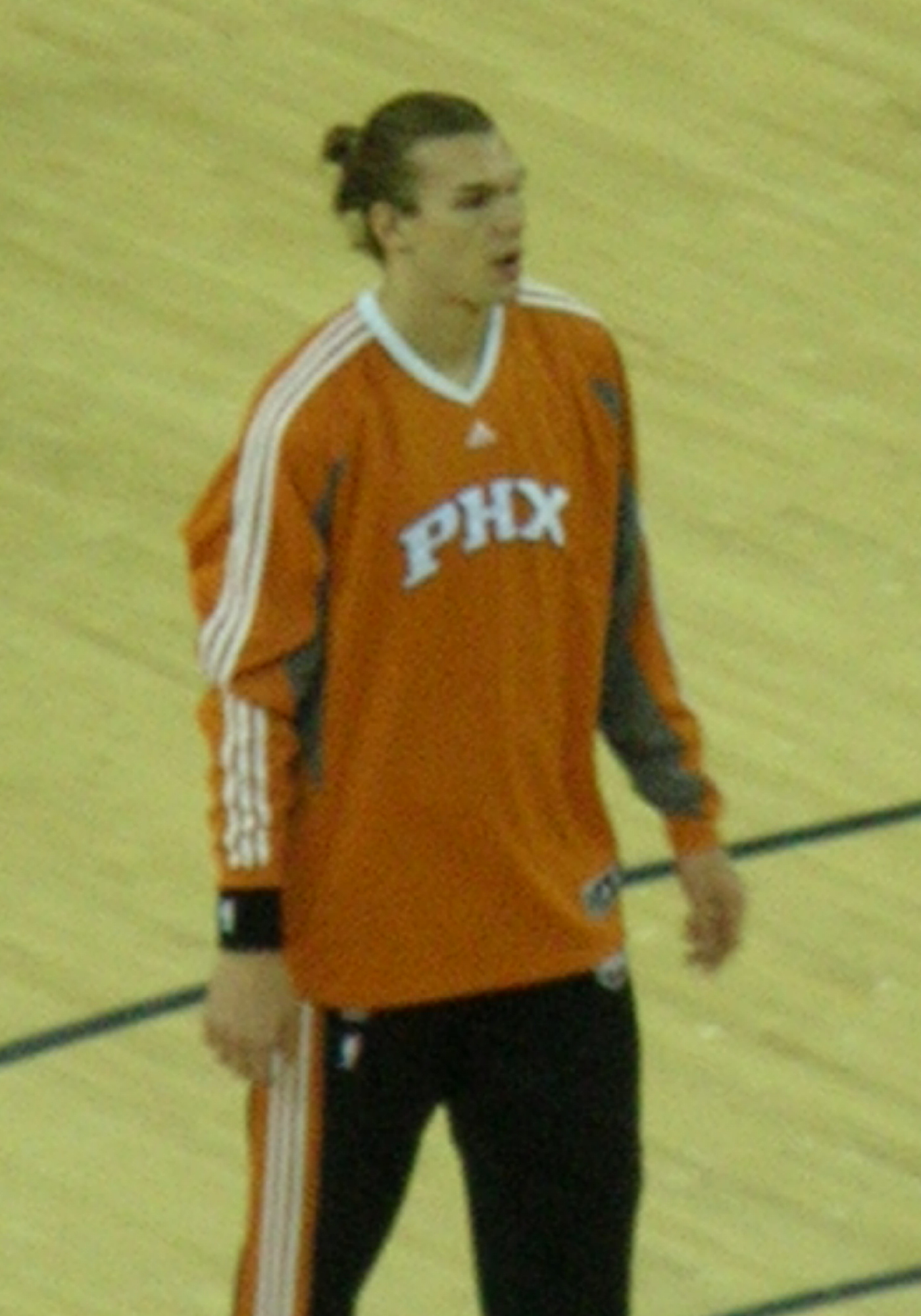
Lou Amundson earned First Team honors in 2006–07.

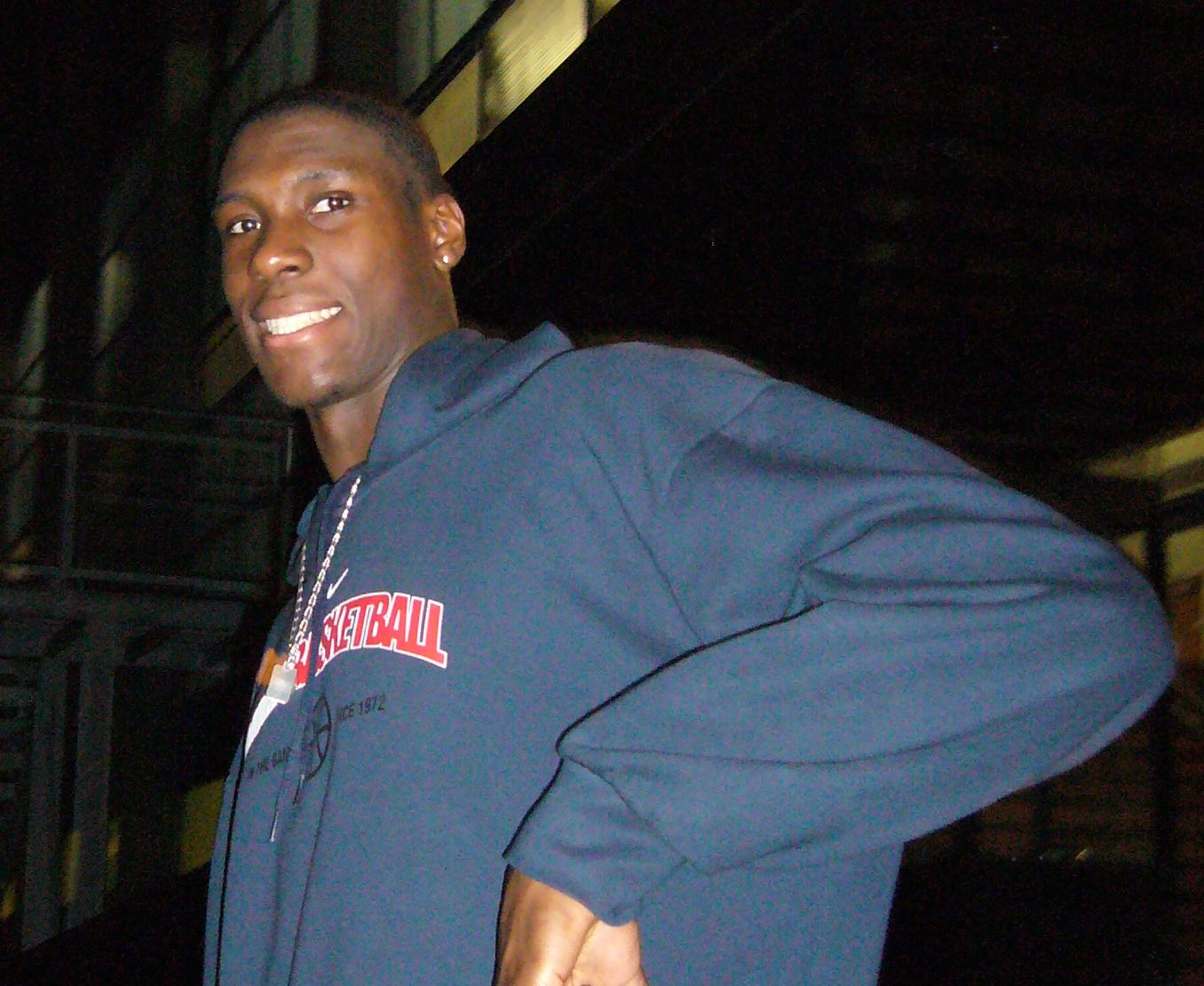
Ian Mahinmi earned First Team honors in 2007–08.

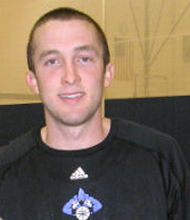
Blake Ahearn has been selected to the All-NBA D-League Team three times.

Season	First team		Second team	
Season	Players	Teams	Players	Teams
2001–02	Isaac Fontaine	Mobile Revelers	Omar Cook	Fayetteville Patriots
2001–02	Tremaine Fowlkes	Columbus Riverdragons	Paul Grant	Asheville Altitude
2001–02	Thomas Hamilton	Greenville Groove	Derek Hood	Mobile Revelers
2001–02	Ansu Sesay	Greenville Groove	Terrell McIntyre	Fayetteville Patriots
2001–02	Billy Thomas	Greenville Groove	Sedric Webber	North Charleston Lowgators
2002–03	Devin Brown	Fayetteville Patriots	Cory Alexander	Roanoke Dazzle
2002–03	Tierre Brown	North Charleston Lowgators	Ernest Brown	Mobile Revelers
2002–03	Tang Hamilton	Columbus Riverdragons	Derek Hood (2)	Mobile Revelers
2002–03	Mikki Moore	Roanoke Dazzle	Nate Johnson	Columbus Riverdragons
2002–03	Jeff Trepagnier	Asheville Altitude	Sedric Webber (2)	North Charleston Lowgators
2003–04	Josh Asselin	Roanoke Dazzle	Omar Cook (2)	Fayetteville Patriots
2003–04	Tierre Brown (2)	Charleston Lowgators	Britton Johnsen	Fayetteville Patriots
2003–04	Jason Collier	Fayetteville Patriots	Brandon Kurtz	Asheville Altitude
2003–04	Desmond Penigar	Asheville Altitude	Philip Ricci	Huntsville Flight
2003–04	Marque Perry	Roanoke Dazzle	Junie Sanders	Fayetteville Patriots
2003–04	—		Ime Udoka	Charleston Lowgators
2004–05	Cory Alexander (2)	Roanoke Dazzle	Damone Brown	Huntsville Flight
2004–05	Matt Carroll	Roanoke Dazzle	Omar Cook (3)	Fayetteville Patriots
2004–05	Hiram Fuller	Florida Flame	Ron Slay	Asheville Altitude
2004–05	Kirk Haston	Florida Flame	James Thomas	Roanoke Dazzle
2004–05	Isiah Victor	Roanoke Dazzle	David Young	Fayetteville Patriots
2004–05	—		Derrick Zimmerman	Columbus Riverdragons
2005–06	Andre Barrett	Florida Flame	Erik Daniels	Fayetteville Patriots
2005–06	Will Bynum	Roanoke Dazzle	John Lucas III	Tulsa 66ers
2005–06	Marcus Fizer	Austin Toros	Scott Merritt	Austin Toros
2005–06	Anthony Grundy	Roanoke Dazzle	Luke Schenscher	Fort Worth Flyers
2005–06	Ime Udoka (2)	Fort Worth Flyers	Jamar Smith	Austin Toros
2005–06	—		Isiah Victor (2)	Roanoke Dazzle
2006–07	Lou Amundson	Colorado 14ers	Will Conroy	Tulsa 66ers
2006–07	Elton Brown	Colorado 14ers	B. J. Elder	Austin Toros
2006–07	Randy Livingston	Idaho Stampede	Kevinn Pinkney	Bakersfield Jam
2006–07	Renaldo Major	Dakota Wizards	Jared Reiner	Sioux Falls Skyforce
2006–07	Von Wafer	Colorado 14ers	Jeremy Richardson	Fort Worth Flyers
2006–07	—		Jawad Williams	Anaheim Arsenal

=== 2007–08 to present ===
Season	First team		Second team		Third team	
Season	Players	Teams	Players	Teams	Players	Teams
2007–08	Sean Banks	Los Angeles D-Fenders	Blake Ahearn	Dakota Wizards	Morris Almond	Utah Flash
2007–08	Eddie Gill	Colorado 14ers	Lance Allred	Idaho Stampede	Jelani McCoy	Los Angeles D-Fenders
2007–08	Randy Livingston (2)	Idaho Stampede	Andre Barrett (2)	Austin Toros	Carlos Powell	Dakota Wizards
2007–08	Ian Mahinmi	Austin Toros	Rod Benson	Dakota Wizards	Billy Thomas (2)	Colorado 14ers
2007–08	Kasib Powell	Sioux Falls Skyforce	Kaniel Dickens	Colorado 14ers	Marcus Williams	Austin Toros
2008–09	Blake Ahearn (2)	Dakota Wizards	Derrick Byars	Bakersfield Jam	Lance Allred (2)	Idaho Stampede
2008–09	Will Conroy (2)	Albuquerque Thunderbirds	Josh Davis	Colorado 14ers	Ronald Dupree	Utah Flash
2008–09	Erik Daniels (2)	Erie BayHawks	Chris Hunter	Fort Wayne Mad Ants	Eddie Gill (2)	Colorado 14ers
2008–09	Courtney Sims	Iowa Energy	Trey Johnson	Bakersfield Jam	Dontell Jefferson	Utah Flash
2008–09	Marcus Williams (2)	Austin Toros	James White	Anaheim Arsenal	Cartier Martin	Iowa Energy
2009–10	Mike Harris	Rio Grande Valley Vipers	Brian Butch	Bakersfield Jam	Alade Aminu	Bakersfield Jam
2009–10	Dwayne Jones	Austin Toros	Will Conroy (3)	Rio Grande Valley Vipers	Antonio Anderson	Rio Grande Valley Vipers
2009–10	Cartier Martin (2)	Iowa Energy	Alonzo Gee	Austin Toros	Earl Barron	Iowa Energy
2009–10	Curtis Stinson	Iowa Energy	Rob Kurz	Fort Wayne Mad Ants	Curtis Jerrells	Austin Toros
2009–10	Reggie Williams	Sioux Falls Skyforce	Mustafa Shakur	Tulsa 66ers	Larry Owens	Tulsa 66ers
2010–11	Joe Alexander	Texas Legends	Jeff Adrien	Rio Grande Valley Vipers	Antonio Daniels	Texas Legends
2010–11	Chris Johnson	Dakota Wizards	Marcus Cousin	Rio Grande Valley Vipers	Patrick Ewing Jr.	Reno Bighorns
2010–11	Ivan Johnson	Erie BayHawks	Orien Greene	Utah Flash	Jerel McNeal	Rio Grande Valley Vipers
2010–11	Trey Johnson (2)	Bakersfield Jam	Othyus Jeffers	Iowa Energy	DeShawn Sims	Maine Red Claws
2010–11	Curtis Stinson (2)	Iowa Energy	Larry Owens (2)	Tulsa 66ers	Sean Williams	Texas Legends
2011–12	Blake Ahearn (3)	Reno Bighorns	Eric Dawson	Austin Toros	Morris Almond (2)	Maine Red Claws
2011–12	Justin Dentmon	Austin Toros	Jeff Foote	Springfield Armor	Brandon Costner	Los Angeles D-Fenders
2011–12	Greg Smith	Rio Grande Valley Vipers	Courtney Fortson	Los Angeles D-Fenders	Dennis Horner	Springfield Armor
2011–12	Malcolm Thomas	Los Angeles D-Fenders	Marcus Lewis	Tulsa 66ers	Jerry Smith	Springfield Armor
2011–12	Edwin Ubiles	Dakota Wizards	Elijah Millsap	Los Angeles D-Fenders	Sean Williams (2)	Texas Legends
2012–13	Brian Butch (2)	Bakersfield Jam	Damion James	Bakersfield Jam	Justin Holiday	Idaho Stampede
2012–13	Andrew Goudelock	Rio Grande Valley Vipers	Cory Joseph	Austin Toros	Jerome Jordan	Los Angeles D-Fenders
2012–13	Jerel McNeal (2)	Bakersfield Jam	Kris Joseph	Springfield Armor	D. J. Kennedy	Rio Grande Valley Vipers
2012–13	Tony Mitchell	Fort Wayne Mad Ants	Travis Leslie	Santa Cruz Warriors	DaJuan Summers	Maine Red Claws
2012–13	Demetris Nichols	Sioux Falls Skyforce	Tim Ohlbrecht	Rio Grande Valley Vipers	Chris Wright	Maine Red Claws
2013–14	Ron Howard	Fort Wayne Mad Ants	Jorge Gutierrez	Canton Charge	Seth Curry	Santa Cruz Warriors
2013–14	Kevin Murphy	Idaho Stampede	DeAndre Liggins	Sioux Falls Skyforce	Troy Daniels	Rio Grande Valley Vipers
2013–14	Othyus Jeffers (2)	Iowa Energy	James Nunnally	Texas Legends	Tony Mitchell (2)	Fort Wayne Mad Ants
2013–14	Robert Covington	Rio Grande Valley Vipers	Chris Wright (2)	Maine Red Claws	Terrence Williams	Los Angeles D-Fenders
2013–14	Justin Hamilton	Sioux Falls Skyforce	Hilton Armstrong	Santa Cruz Warriors	Arinze Onuaku	Canton Charge
2014–15	Jerrelle Benimon	Idaho Stampede	Chris Babb	Maine Red Claws	Jabari Brown	Los Angeles D-Fenders
2014–15	Seth Curry (2)	Erie BayHawks	Bryce Cotton	Austin Spurs	Eric Griffin	Texas Legends
2014–15	Earl Barron (2)	Bakersfield Jam	James Michael McAdoo	Santa Cruz Warriors	Jerel McNeal (3)	Bakersfield Jam
2014–15	Tim Frazier	Maine Red Claws	Arinze Onuaku (2)	Canton Charge	Adonis Thomas	Grand Rapids Drive
2014–15	Willie Reed	Grand Rapids Drive	Elliot Williams	Santa Cruz Warriors	Damien Wilkins	Iowa Energy
2015–16	Erick Green	Reno Bighorns	Jimmer Fredette	Westchester Knicks	Sean Kilpatrick	Delaware 87ers
2015–16	Vander Blue	Los Angeles D-Fenders	Will Cummings	Rio Grande Valley Vipers	Quinn Cook	Canton Charge
2015–16	Jarnell Stokes	Sioux Falls Skyforce	Coty Clarke	Maine Red Claws	Devin Ebanks	Grand Rapids Drive
2015–16	Jeff Ayres	Los Angeles D-Fenders	Nick Minnerath	Canton Charge	Ryan Gomes	Los Angeles D-Fenders
2015–16	Alex Stepheson	Iowa Energy	DeAndre Liggins (2)	Sioux Falls Skyforce	Jordan Bachynski	Westchester Knicks
2016–17	Quinn Cook (2)	Canton Charge	Josh Magette	Los Angeles D-Fenders	Marcus Georges-Hunt	Maine Red Claws
2016–17	Vander Blue (2)	Los Angeles D-Fenders	Brianté Weber	Sioux Falls Skyforce	Axel Toupane	Raptors 905
2016–17	Keith Benson	Sioux Falls Skyforce	Abdel Nader	Maine Red Claws	John Holland	Canton Charge
2016–17	Dakari Johnson	Oklahoma City Blue	Alex Poythress	Fort Wayne Mad Ants	Jalen Jones	Maine Red Claws
2016–17	Edy Tavares	Raptors 905	Shawn Long	Delaware 87ers	Eric Moreland	Canton Charge
2017–18	Lorenzo Brown	Raptors 905	Antonio Blakeney	Windy City Bulls	Jaron Blossomgame	Austin Spurs
2017–18	Thomas Bryant	South Bay Lakers	Alex Caruso	South Bay Lakers	Trey Burke	Westchester Knicks
2017–18	Quinn Cook (3)	Santa Cruz Warriors	Amile Jefferson	Iowa Wolves	Luke Kornet	Westchester Knicks
2017–18	Georges Niang	Salt Lake City Stars	Johnathan Motley	Texas Legends	Walter Lemon Jr.	Fort Wayne Mad Ants
2017–18	Jameel Warney	Texas Legends	Christian Wood	Delaware 87ers	Landry Nnoko	Grand Rapids Drive
2018–19	Chris Boucher	Raptors 905	Isaiah Hartenstein	Rio Grande Valley Vipers	PJ Dozier	Maine Red Claws
2018–19	Angel Delgado	Agua Caliente Clippers	Walter Lemon Jr. (2)	Windy City Bulls	Amile Jefferson (2)	Lakeland Magic
2018–19	Jordan Loyd	Raptors 905	Yante Maten	Sioux Falls Skyforce	Kalin Lucas	Grand Rapids Drive
2018–19	Jordan McRae	Capital City Go-Go	Johnathan Motley (2)	Agua Caliente Clippers	Duncan Robinson	Sioux Falls Skyforce
2018–19	Alan Williams	Long Island Nets	Theo Pinson	Long Island Nets	Christian Wood (2)	Wisconsin Herd
2019–20	Jaylen Adams	Wisconsin Herd	Donta Hall	Grand Rapids Drive	Justin Anderson	Long Island Nets
2019–20	Jarrell Brantley	Salt Lake City Stars	B. J. Johnson	Lakeland Magic	Dusty Hannahs	Memphis Hustle
2019–20	Devontae Cacok	South Bay Lakers	Josh Magette (2)	Lakeland Magic	Jemerrio Jones	Wisconsin Herd
2019–20	Frank Mason III	Wisconsin Herd	Johnathan Motley (3)	Agua Caliente Clippers	Vic Law	Lakeland Magic
2019–20	Jarrod Uthoff	Memphis Hustle	Tremont Waters	Maine Red Claws	Marial Shayok	Delaware Blue Coats
2020–21	Moses Brown	Oklahoma City Blue	Oshae Brissett	Fort Wayne Mad Ants	Tyler Cook	Iowa Wolves
2020–21	Mamadi Diakite	Lakeland Magic	Henry Ellenson	Raptors 905	Tre Jones	Austin Spurs
2020–21	Jared Harper	Westchester Knicks	Malachi Flynn	Raptors 905	Jordan Poole	Santa Cruz Warriors
2020–21	Kevin Porter Jr.	Rio Grande Valley Vipers	Alize Johnson	Raptors 905	Jarrod Uthoff (2)	Erie BayHawks
2020–21	Paul Reed	Delaware Blue Coats	Brodric Thomas	Canton Charge	Robert Woodard II	Austin Spurs
2021–22	Justin Anderson (2)	Fort Wayne Mad Ants	Cat Barber	College Park Skyhawks	Luka Garza	Motor City Cruise
2021–22	Mason Jones	South Bay Lakers	Charles Bassey	Delaware Blue Coats	Jared Harper (2)	Birmingham Squadron
2021–22	Justin Tillman	College Park Skyhawks	Braxton Key	Motor City Cruise	Justin Jackson	Texas Legends
2021–22	Trevelin Queen	Rio Grande Valley Vipers	Saben Lee	Motor City Cruise	Carlik Jones	Texas Legends
2021–22	Moses Wright	Agua Caliente Clippers / Texas Legends	Reggie Perry	Raptors 905	Anthony Lamb	Rio Grande Valley Vipers
2022–23	David Duke Jr.	Long Island Nets	Jamaree Bouyea	Sioux Falls Skyforce	Justin Anderson (3)	Fort Wayne Mad Ants
2022–23	Jay Huff	Capital City Go-Go / South Bay Lakers	Sharife Cooper	Cleveland Charge	Chris Chiozza	Long Island Nets
2022–23	Carlik Jones (2)	Windy City Bulls	Darius Days	Rio Grande Valley Vipers	Moussa Diabaté	Ontario Clippers
2022–23	Kenneth Lofton Jr.	Memphis Hustle	Mfiondu Kabengele	Maine Celtics	Isaiah Mobley	Cleveland Charge
2022–23	Neemias Queta	Stockton Kings	Luka Šamanić	Maine Celtics	Xavier Moon	Ontario Clippers
2023–24	Kenneth Lofton Jr. (2)	Delaware Blue Coats / Salt Lake City Stars	Darius Bazley	Delaware Blue Coats / Salt Lake City Stars	JD Davison	Maine Celtics
2023–24	Mac McClung	Osceola Magic	Justin Champagnie	Sioux Falls Skyforce / Capital City Go-Go	Elfrid Payton	Indiana Mad Ants
2023–24	Jason Preston	Memphis Hustle / Salt Lake City Stars	Malcolm Hill	Birmingham Squadron	Jahmi'us Ramsey	Oklahoma City Blue / Raptors 905
2023–24	Oscar Tshiebwe	Indiana Mad Ants	Mason Jones (2)	Stockton Kings	Adama Sanogo	Windy City Bulls
2023–24	Alondes Williams	Sioux Falls Skyforce	Trevelin Queen (2)	Osceola Magic	Ethan Thompson	Capitanes de la Ciudad de México
2024–25	Jaylen Nowell	Capital City Go-Go	Bryce McGowens	Rip City Remix	Chuma Okeke	Westchester Knicks
2024–25	JD Davison (2)	Maine Celtics	Elijah Harkless	San Diego Clippers / Salt Lake City Stars	Isaac Jones	Stockton Kings
2024–25	Mac McClung (2)	Osceola Magic	Mason Jones (3)	Stockton Kings	Josh Christopher	Sioux Falls Skyforce
2024–25	Malachi Flynn (2)	Austin Spurs	Moses Brown (2)	Westchester Knicks	T. J. Warren	Westchester Knicks
2024–25	Oscar Tshiebwe (2)	Salt Lake City	Drew Timme	Long Island Nets	Trey Alexander	Grand Rapids Gold
2025–26	DaQuan Jeffries	Stockton Kings	Kobe Bufkin	South Bay Lakers	RayJ Dennis	College Park Skyhawks
2025–26	Isaac Jones (2)	Motor City Cruise	Killian Hayes	Cleveland Charge	PJ Hall	Greensboro Swarm
2025–26	Mac McClung (3)	Windy City Bulls	A. J. Lawson	Raptors 905	Ron Harper Jr.	Maine Celtics
2025–26	Tristen Newton	Rio Grande Valley Vipers	Drew Timme (2)	South Bay Lakers	Alijah Martin	Raptors 905
2025–26	Lester Quiñones	Osceola Magic	Jahmir Young	Sioux Falls Skyforce	Daishen Nix	Rio Grande Valley Vipers

== See also ==
- All-NBA Team
