= List of NBA G League champions =

The NBA G League Finals is the championship game or series for the NBA G League and the conclusion of the league's postseason. The league was previously known as the National Basketball Development League (NBDL) from 2001 to 2005 and the National Basketball Association Development League (NBA D-League) from 2005 to 2017.

Since the league's inception in 2001–02, a variety of formats has been used to determine the champion. From the inaugural postseason in 2002 until 2006, the four teams with the best records advanced to the postseason. In the first two seasons, both the semifinal round and the Finals were held in a best-of-three format. Then, between 2004 and 2007, the playoffs used a single-elimination tournament among the four teams, with two semifinal games and one winner-take-all championship match.

In 2007, the league expanded to twelve teams and was divided into Eastern and Western Conferences, comprising six teams each. All playoff rounds were one game each, ending with the Eastern Conference's Dakota Wizards winning the championship 129–121 in overtime against the Colorado 14ers. The best-of-three format for the Finals returned in 2008. With the league's continued expansion to fourteen teams in 2008 and sixteen teams in 2009, the two-conference format was replaced with a three-division format consisting of Western, Southwestern and Central Divisions. Both the 2008 and 2009 NBADL championship series were between teams representing the Western and Southwestern Divisions, with no Central teams making it to the finals. The 2009–10 season saw a reformatting to having Eastern and Western Conferences, with the 2012–13 season being the only one with a third conference named as the Central and the 2013–14 season having just Divisions rather than conferences. Due to there being two more teams in the Western Conference (nine) than the Eastern Conference (seven), and because the top eight teams with the best regular season records qualified for the postseason irrespective of conference, the 2010 and 2012 NBADL Finals consisted of two Western Conference teams. Finally, in the 2014–15 season, the playoff structure was changed so the teams were separated by conference in seeding. The 2021 edition of the Finals was a one-game match, which equaled the number of games played for the other playoff rounds as played by the eight teams that were seeded solely by record. The league returned to the best-of-three format for the Finals in 2022.

The Rio Grande Valley Vipers lead the league in championship appearances (seven) and championships (four).

== Key ==
**Bold**	Winning team of the Finals
^{†}	Had or tied for the best regular season record for that season
Team (X)	Denotes the number of times the team has won (also includes past names of franchise, if applicable)

== Champions ==
Year	Champion	Division	Coach	Result	Runner-up	Division	Coach
2002	**Greenville Groove**^{†}	—	Milton Barnes	2–0	North Charleston Lowgators^{†}	—	Alex English
2003	**Mobile Revelers**	—	Sam Vincent	2–1	Fayetteville Patriots^{†}	—	Jeff Capel II
2004	**Asheville Altitude**^{†}	—	Joey Meyer	108–106 (OT) (Note: One-game championship)	Huntsville Flight	—	Ralph Lewis
2005	**Asheville Altitude** (2)	—	Joey Meyer	90–67 (Note: One-game championship)	Columbus Riverdragons^{†}	—	Jeff Malone
2006	**Albuquerque Thunderbirds**	—	Michael Cooper	119–108 (Note: One-game championship)	Fort Worth Flyers^{†}	—	Sam Vincent
2007	**Dakota Wizards**^{†}	Eastern	Dave Joerger	129–121 (OT) (Note: One-game championship)	Colorado 14ers	Western	Joe Wolf
2008	**Idaho Stampede**^{†}	Western	Bryan Gates	2–1	Austin Toros	Southwest	Quin Snyder
2009	**Colorado 14ers**^{†}	Southwest	Bob MacKinnon Jr	2–0	Utah Flash	Western	Brad Jones
Year	Champion	Conference	Coach	Result	Runner-up	Conference	Coach
2010	**Rio Grande Valley Vipers**	Western	Chris Finch	2–0	Tulsa 66ers	Western	Nate Tibbetts
2011	**Iowa Energy**^{†}	Eastern	Nick Nurse	2–1	Rio Grande Valley Vipers	Western	Chris Finch
2012	**Austin Toros**	Western	Brad Jones	2–1	Los Angeles D-Fenders^{†}	Western	Eric Musselman
2013	**Rio Grande Valley Vipers** (2)	Central	Nick Nurse	2–0	Santa Cruz Warriors	Western	Nate Bjorkgren
2014	**Fort Wayne Mad Ants**^{†}	Eastern	Conner Henry	2–0	Santa Cruz Warriors	Western	Casey Hill
2015	**Santa Cruz Warriors**^{†} (2)	Western	Casey Hill	2–0	Fort Wayne Mad Ants	Eastern	Conner Henry
2016	**Sioux Falls Skyforce**^{†}	Eastern	Dan Craig	2–1	Los Angeles D-Fenders	Western	Casey Owens
2017	**Raptors 905**^{†}	Eastern	Jerry Stackhouse	2–1	Rio Grande Valley Vipers	Western	Matt Brase
2018	**Austin Spurs**^{†} (2)	Western	Blake Ahearn	2–0	Raptors 905	Eastern	Jerry Stackhouse
2019	**Rio Grande Valley Vipers**^{†} (3)	Western	Joseph Blair	2–1	Long Island Nets^{†}	Eastern	Will Weaver
2020	No NBA G League playoffs due to the COVID-19 pandemic						
2021	**Lakeland Magic**	—	Stan Heath	97–78 (Note: One-game championship)	Delaware Blue Coats	—	Connor Johnson
2022	**Rio Grande Valley Vipers** (4)	Western	Mahmoud Abdelfattah	2–0	Delaware Blue Coats	Eastern	Coby Karl
2023	**Delaware Blue Coats**	Eastern	Coby Karl	2–0	Rio Grande Valley Vipers	Western	Kevin Burleson
2024	**Oklahoma City Blue**	Western	Kameron Woods	2–1	Maine Celtics	Eastern	Blaine Mueller
2025	**Stockton Kings**^{†}	Western	Quinton Crawford	2–1	Osceola Magic^{†}	Eastern	Dylan Murphy
2026	**Greensboro Swarm**	Eastern	D.J. Bakker	2–0	Stockton Kings	Western	Will Scott

== Results by teams ==
Teams	Finals appearances	Championships	Runners-up	Years won	Years runners-up	Playoff appearances
Rio Grande Valley Vipers	7	4	3	2010, 2013, 2019, 2022	2011, 2017, 2023	12
Asheville Altitude / Tulsa 66ers^{[a]} / Oklahoma City Blue	4	3	1	2004, 2005, 2024	2010	10
Dakota Wizards / Santa Cruz Warriors^{[f]}	4	2	2	2007, 2015	2013, 2014	13
Columbus Riverdragons / Austin Toros^{[b]} / Austin Spurs	4	2	2	2012, 2018	2005, 2008	11
Utah Flash / Delaware 87ers / Delaware Blue Coats	4	1	3	2023	2009, 2021, 2022	7
Huntsville Flight / Albuquerque Thunderbirds / New Mexico Thunderbirds / Canton Charge / Cleveland Charge^{[d]}	2	1	1	2006	2004	11
Colorado 14ers / Texas Legends^{[c]}	2	1	1	2009	2007	6
Fort Wayne / Indiana Mad Ants / Noblesville Boom^{[g]}	2	1	1	2014	2015	7
Raptors 905	2	1	1	2017	2018	5
Reno Bighorns / Stockton Kings	2	1	0	2025	—	9
Greenville Groove	1	1	0	2002	—	1
Mobile Revelers	1	1	0	2003	—	2
Idaho Stampede / Salt Lake City Stars	1	1	0	2008	—	6
Iowa Energy / Iowa Wolves	1	1	0	2011	—	5
Sioux Falls Skyforce	1	1	0	2016	—	8
Erie BayHawks / Lakeland Magic / Osceola Magic	1	1	0	2021	—	7
Greensboro Swarm	1	1	0	2026	—	2
Long Island Nets	1	0	1	—	2019	4
North Charleston Lowgators / Charleston Lowgators / Florida Flame^{[e]}	1	0	1	—	2002	4
Fayetteville Patriots	1	0	1	—	2003	2
Fort Worth Flyers	1	0	1	—	2006	2
Maine Celtics	1	0	1	—	2024	6
Los Angeles D-Fenders / South Bay Lakers	2	0	2	—	2012, 2016	8
Bakersfield Jam / Northern Arizona Suns / Motor City Cruise	0	—	—	—	—	6
Capital City Go-Go	0	—	—	—	—	3
Grand Rapids Drive	0	—	—	—	—	3
Westchester Knicks	0	—	—	—	—	3
Erie BayHawks / College Park Skyhawks	0	—	—	—	—	2
Erie BayHawks / Birmingham Squadron	0	—	—	—	—	2
Memphis Hustle	0	—	—	—	—	2
Agua Caliente / Ontario / San Diego Clippers^{[h]}	0	—	—	—	—	1
Windy City Bulls	0	—	—	—	—	1
NBA G League Ignite	0	0	0	0	0	1
Wisconsin Herd	0	—	—	—	—	0
Rip City Remix	0	—	—	—	—	0
Capitanes de la Ciudad de México	0	—	—	—	—	0

== See also ==
- List of NBA champions

== Notes ==
- **^{a}** The Asheville Altitude relocated and became the Tulsa 66ers in 2005–06.
- **^{b}** The Columbus Riverdragons relocated and became the Austin Toros in 2005–06.
- **^{c}** The Colorado 14ers went on hiatus in 2009–10 and returned as the Texas Legends in 2010–11 after a relocation.
- **^{d}** The Huntsville Flight relocated and became the Albuquerque Thunderbirds in 2005–06, then the franchise renamed itself to the New Mexico Thunderbirds in 2010–11. The franchise was then purchased and relocated in 2011–12 and became known as the Canton Charge and then the Cleveland Charge in 2021–22.
- **^{e}** After two years as the North Charleston Lowgators, the franchise became known as the Charleston Lowgators for one season prior to their relocation. The franchise was known as the Florida Flame for the 2004 through 2006 seasons.
- **^{f}** The Dakota Wizards relocated and became the Santa Cruz Warriors in 2012–13.
- **^{g}** The Fort Wayne Mad Ants relocated to Indianapolis in 2023–24, playing as the Indiana Mad Ants. After the 2024–25 season, the team relocated again, this time to the Indianapolis suburb of Noblesville, as the Noblesville Boom.
- **^{h}** The Agua Caliente Clippers rebranded as the Ontario Clippers in 2022 without relocating. Starting in 2024–25, the team relocated to Oceanside, California as the San Diego Clippers.
