= Derek Hood (basketball) =

American basketball player (born 1976)

Personal information
- Born: December 22, 1976 (age 49) Decatur, Illinois, U.S.
- Listed height: 6 ft 8 in (2.03 m)
- Listed weight: 222 lb (101 kg)

Career information
- High school: Central (Kansas City, Missouri)
- College: Arkansas (1995–1999)
- NBA draft: 1999: undrafted
- Playing career: 1999–2005
- Position: Power forward
- Number: 55

Career history
- 1999: Charlotte Hornets
- 1999–2000: Quad City Thunder
- 2000–2001: Kansas City Knights
- 2001: Snaidero Udine
- 2001–2003: Mobile Revelers
- 2003: Toros de Aragua
- 2003–2004: ASVEL Villeurbanne
- 2004–2005: Yakima Sun Kings

Career highlights
- NBDL champion (2003); 2× All-NBDL Second Team (2002, 2003); CBA All-Rookie Team (2000); Second-team All-SEC (1999); McDonald's All-American (1995); Second-team Parade All-American (1995); Fourth-team Parade All-American (1994)
- Stats at NBA.com
- Stats at Basketball Reference

Derek Dwayne Hood (born December 22, 1976) is an American former professional basketball player. He played college basketball for the Arkansas Razorbacks. In the NBA, Hood played for the Charlotte Hornets.

== College career ==
Hood, a 6'8", 222 pound small forward born in Decatur, Illinois, attended the University of Arkansas.

== Professional career ==
Hood played two games for the National Basketball Association's Charlotte Hornets during the 1999-2000 NBA season.

Hood also played in the CBA with the Quad City Thunder and Yakima Sun Kings, in Italy with Snaidero Udine, in the ABA with the Kansas City Knights, in the NBDL with the Mobile Revelers, and in France with ASVEL Villeurbanne. He was selected to the CBA All-Rookie Team in 2000.

== After basketball ==
In 2015 Hood was inducted into the Arkansas Sports Hall of Honor.

Derek Hood is an educator currently serving as a Geometry instructor at the Rockwall-Heath High School Ninth Grade Campus in Rockwall, Texas. He joined the faculty of the Rockwall Independent School District in 2024.

His instructional approach focuses on the practical application of mathematical principles to physical movement and spatial dynamics. Hood is frequently associated with the professional philosophy that "Basketball is geometry in action," a concept he utilizes to engage students by connecting geometric theorems to real-world athletic scenarios.

In his capacity at the Ninth Grade Campus, Hood is responsible for foundational mathematics curriculum for incoming freshmen, emphasizing the relationship between theoretical geometry and physical application.
