= Thomas Hamilton (basketball) =

American basketball player (born 1975)

Personal information
- Born: April 3, 1975 (age 50) Chicago, Illinois, U.S.
- Listed height: 7 ft 2 in (2.18 m)
- Listed weight: 330 lb (150 kg)

Career information
- High school: King (Chicago, Illinois)
- NBA draft: 1994: undrafted
- Playing career: 1994–2003
- Position: Center
- Number: 30

Career history
- 1995–1996: Boston Celtics
- 1999–2000: Houston Rockets
- 2001–2002: Roanoke Dazzle
- 2002–2003: Greenville Groove

Career highlights
- All-NBDL First Team (2002)
- Stats at NBA.com
- Stats at Basketball Reference

Thomas Thaddeus Hamilton (born April 3, 1975) is an American former professional basketball player.

== High school career ==
Hamilton attended Chicago's Martin Luther King High School, graduating in 1993. He was a high school teammate of Rashard Griffith (the 38th pick in the 1995 NBA draft) and the pair led their school to the 1993 Illinois State Basketball Championship.

The 7-foot, 2-inch, 330-pound center signed a letter of intent to play for Lou Henson at the University of Illinois, but was not academically eligible, and ultimately attended the University of Pittsburgh, though he did not play on the basketball team. In fact, prior to the 1995–96 NBA season, Hamilton had never played basketball professionally nor in college.

== Professional career ==
=== Boston Celtics (1995–1996) ===
Hamilton went undrafted in the 1994 NBA draft, but started working out with the Toronto Raptors. He was signed by the Raptors on October 6, 1995, but was released on October 18.

Hamilton was signed by the Boston Celtics at the beginning of the 1995–96 season, but did not appear in a game until about five weeks remained in the regular season. He spent most of the season on both the injured and suspended lists. When he was fit to play, he appeared in 11 games and scored a total of 25 points. He averaged two rebounds and nearly one block per game in limited action. His weight was listed at 360 pounds when he taken off of the suspended list and appeared in his first NBA game. In his NBA debut on March 17, 1996, Hamilton had two points, two rebounds, and two blocked shots against the New Jersey Nets. He would score a career-high 13 points and grab six rebounds in only 12 minutes against the Washington Bullets on April 10. On June 28, Hamilton was waived by the Celtics.

=== Chicago Bulls and Miami Heat (1996–1999) ===
Hamilton was signed by the Chicago Bulls on October 23, 1996, but was released on December 18 without playing a game.

Hamilton was signed again by the Bulls on October 6, 1997, but he was waived on October 21.

Hamilton was signed by the Miami Heat on January 26, 1999, but was waived on February 4 without appearing in a game.

=== Houston Rockets (1999–2000) ===
Hamilton was signed by the Houston Rockets at the beginning of the 1999–2000 NBA season. He played in 22 games and made seven starts. He suffered a lower back strain and placed on the injured list for nearly two months until he was released on January 13, 2000. He averaged 12.4 minutes, 3.7 points, 4.1 rebounds, and 0.6 blocks per game with the Rockets playing small forward. That was his second year at that position with the same injury. Rockets legend Calvin Murphy nicknamed him "2 Sandwiches" in his tenure with Houston.

=== Roanoke Dazzle (2001–2002) ===
On September 28, 2001, Hamilton signed with the Washington Wizards, but was waived on October 4.

On November 3, 2001, Hamilton was selected with the 25th overall pick in the 2001 NBDL supplemental draft by the Roanoke Dazzle. He was selected to the All-NBDL First Team in 2002.

On September 30, 2002, Hamilton signed with the New Orleans Hornets, but was waived on October 12.

== Personal life ==
Hamilton's son, Thomas Jr., was a top basketball player at Chicago's Whitney Young High School before transferring to IMG Academy. He played college basketball for the Texas Tech Red Raiders basketball team.

== Career statistics ==
Legend
GP	Games played	GS	Games started	MPG	Minutes per game
FG%	Field goal percentage	3P%	3-point field goal percentage	FT%	Free throw percentage
RPG	Rebounds per game	APG	Assists per game	SPG	Steals per game
BPG	Blocks per game	PPG	Points per game	**Bold**	Career high
†	Won an NBA championship

=== NBA ===
==== Regular season ====
Year	Team	GP	GS	MPG	FG%	3P%	FT%	RPG	APG	SPG	BPG	PPG
1995–96	Boston	11	0	6.4	.290	–	.389	2.0	.1	.0	**.8**	2.3
1999–00	Houston	**22**	**7**	**12.4**	**.443**	–	**.522**	**4.1**	**.7**	**.2**	.6	**3.7**
Career		33	7	10.4	.400	–	.463	3.4	.5	.1	.7	3.2

=== NBDL ===
==== Regular season ====
Year	Team	GP	GS	MPG	FG%	3P%	FT%	RPG	APG	SPG	BPG	PPG
2001–02	Roanoke	18	16	**31.8**	.583	–	**.507**	**10.4**	**2.0**	**.4**	**1.8**	**12.1**
2001–02†	Greenville	**32**	**28**	24.8	**.595**	.000	.471	8.8	1.7	.3	1.0	8.8
2002–03	Greenville	6	0	11.8	.556	.000	.455	3.2	.3	.3	.0	4.2
Career		56	44	25.7	.589	.000	.486	8.7	1.7	.3	1.1	9.3

==== Playoffs ====
Year	Team	GP	GS	MPG	FG%	3P%	FT%	RPG	APG	SPG	BPG	PPG
2002†	Greenville	5	5	24.0	.600	–	.500	7.8	1.2	3.0	2.6	7.6
