= Kaniel Dickens =

American basketball player (born 1978)

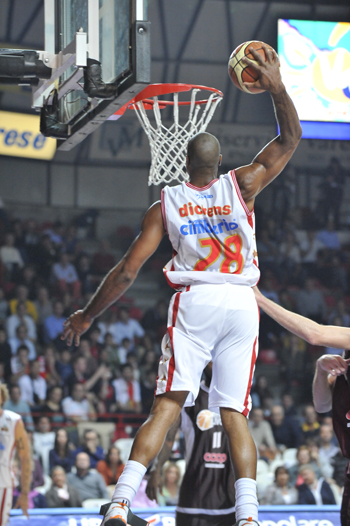
- Dickens with Cimberio Varese in 2009

Personal information
- Born: July 21, 1978 (age 48) Denver, Colorado, U. S.
- Listed height: 6 ft 8 in (2.03 m)
- Listed weight: 215 lb (98 kg)

Career information
- High school: East (Denver, Colorado)
- College: Tyler JC (1997–1998); Idaho (1998–2000)
- NBA draft: 2000: 2nd round, 50th overall pick
- Drafted by: Utah Jazz
- Playing career: 2000–2011
- Position: Power forward / small forward
- Number: 28, 45

Career history
- 2000–2001: Ural Great Perm
- 2001: Harlem Globetrotters
- 2001: Fayetteville Patriots
- 2002: Mobile Revelers
- 2002–2003: Beijing Olympians
- 2003: Ovarense
- 2003: Dakota Wizards
- 2003: Portland Trail Blazers
- 2004: Dakota Wizards
- 2004: Joventut Badalona
- 2005: Idaho Stampede
- 2005: New Jersey Nets
- 2005–2006: Fayetteville Patriots
- 2006–2007: Cherkaski Mavpy
- 2007–2008: Colorado 14ers
- 2008: Cleveland Cavaliers
- 2008: Colorado 14ers
- 2008–2009: Cimberio Varese
- 2009–2010: SLUC Nancy
- 2010–2011: Mazzeo San Severo
- 2011: Southland Sharks

Career highlights
- LegaDue champion (2009); All-NBA D-League Second Team (2008); CBA champion (2004); All-CBA First Team (2004)
- Stats at NBA.com
- Stats at Basketball Reference

Kaniel Dickens (born July 21, 1978) is an American former professional basketball player. He was selected by the Utah Jazz in the second round (50th pick overall) in the 2000 NBA draft.

== College career ==
Dickens first played college basketball for Barton Junior College and then Tyler Junior College. He ended his college career by playing two seasons at the University of Idaho. At Idaho, Dickens averaged 9.3 points and 5.7 rebounds.

== Professional career ==
In addition to being drafted 50th overall by the Jazz, Dickens was drafted 42nd by the Idaho Stampede of the Continental Basketball Association and 21st by the Las Vegas Silver Bandits of the International Basketball League. Dickens played the 2000–01 season for Ural Great in Russia.

Dickens was signed as a free agent by the Portland Trail Blazers on December 19, 2003, and appeared in 3 games for them during the 2003–04 season. He signed a 10-day contract with the New Jersey Nets on 01/05/2005 and saw action in 11 games.

=== 2007–08 season ===
Dickens began the 2007–2008 season with the Colorado 14ers of the NBDL. In 29 games (28 starts), prior to his NBA callup, Dickens averaged a team high 20.4 points and 5.2 rebounds. Dickens was selected to play in the 2008 D-League All-Star Game.

On February 22, 2008, Dickens was signed to a ten-day contract with the Cleveland Cavaliers so they would have enough players to face the Washington Wizards that night, due to a depleted roster because of a blockbuster trade the day prior. Dickens saw his first action as a Cavalier on that very night, logging seven minutes with one rebound and a blocked shot.

On March 3, 2008, the Cavaliers signed Dickens to a second ten-day contract. His contract expired on March 13, 2008, allowing Dickens to become a free agent. Dicken's final NBA game was played on March 6, 2008, in a 96 - 107 loss to the Chicago Bulls. In his final game, Dickens recorded only 2 points and no other stats.

In August 2008 he signed with Italian club S.S. Basket Napoli. He was waived in September and signed with Pallacanestro Varese later that month.

In August 2009 he signed a contract with the French Pro A team SLUC Nancy.

For the 2011 New Zealand NBL season, Dickens signed with the Southland Sharks.
