= Isaac Fontaine =

American basketball player (born 1975)

Personal information
- Born: April 16, 1975 (age 51) Sacramento, California, U.S.
- Listed height: 6 ft 4 in (1.93 m)
- Listed weight: 210 lb (95 kg)

Career information
- High school: Jesuit Carmichael (Sacramento, California)
- College: Washington State (1993–1997)
- NBA draft: 1997: undrafted
- Playing career: 1997–2005
- Position: Shooting guard

Career history
- 1997: Scavolini Pesaro
- 1997–1998: SLUC Nancy
- 1998–2000: Connecticut Pride
- 2000–2001: La Crosse Bobcats
- 2001: Basket Rimini
- 2001–2003: Mobile Revelers
- 2002: Memphis Grizzlies
- 2003: Alaska Aces
- 2003–2004: Huntsville Flight
- 2004: Basket Napoli
- 2004–2005: Zhejiang Whirlwinds

Career highlights
- CBA champion (1999); All-NBDL First Team (2002); 2× First-team All-Pac-10 (1996, 1997)
- Stats at NBA.com
- Stats at Basketball Reference

Isaac Henry Sedric Fontaine IV (born April 16, 1975) is an American former professional basketball player. Born in Sacramento, California, he played collegiately at Washington State University. He played in the NBA for the Memphis Grizzlies during the 2001–02 season, playing six games. The following season, in 2002–03, he played with the Mobile Revelers of the NBA Development League.

Fontaine won a Continental Basketball Association (CBA) championship with the Connecticut Pride in 1999.
