= Casey Hill =

American basketball coach (born 1983)

California Golden Bears
- Position: Assistant coach
- League: Atlantic Coast Conference

Personal information
- Born: 1983 (age 42–43) Lawrence, Kansas, U.S.

Career information
- College: Trinity University (2003–2007)
- Coaching career: 2010–present

Career history

Coaching
- 2010–2011: Tokyo Apache (assistant)
- 2011–2012: Santa Cruz Warriors (assistant)
- 2013–2017: Santa Cruz Warriors
- 2017–2018: Agua Caliente Clippers
- 2018–2020: Los Angeles Clippers (assistant)
- 2020–2026: New Orleans Pelicans (assistant)
- 2026–present: California (assistant)

Career highlights
- NBA D-League champion (2015)

Casey Hill (born 1983) is an American professional basketball coach who's currently an assistant coach for the California Golden Bears men's basketball team. Prior to this, he had most recently served as an assistant coach for the New Orleans Pelicans of the National Basketball Association (NBA). Hill previously served four years as the head coach for the Santa Cruz Warriors of the NBA G League.

== Playing career ==
Casey Hill played for Trinity University in San Antonio. During Hill's time as a Trinity player (from 2003–04 to 2006–07) the Tigers advanced three times to the NCAA Division III Playoffs. The 2004–05 team ended the season in the NCAA Div.III Elite Eight. Trinity also captured two Southern Collegiate Athletic Conference Championships with Hill as a player. Notably, Hill wore a t-shirt under his jersey for his entire college playing career.

== Coaching career ==
During the 2010–11 season he served as an assistant basketball coach to his father – longtime NBA coach Bob Hill – for the Tokyo Apache. The Tokyo Apache were a basketball team that competed in the top-level Japanese professional League.

The Golden State Warriors hired Hill in 2011. During the 2011–12 season he worked as an assistant coach for the Tokyo Apache. In 2012–13 Casey served as an assistant coach for Santa Cruz Warriors. In 2013, he became the head coach for the Santa Cruz Warriors. In 2015, Hill led Santa Cruz to the NBA Development League Championship. In 2017, Hill was hired as head coach by the Agua Caliente Clippers.

On August 1, 2018, Hill was hired by the Los Angeles Clippers as an assistant coach.

On November 16, 2020, Hill was hired as an assistant coach by the New Orleans Pelicans. On April 17, 2026, it was announced that Hill would not return to the Pelicans' staff for the 2026–27 NBA season.

On August 26, 2026, Hill was hired as an assistant coach for the California Golden Bears men's basketball team.

== Personal life ==
Hill's father is Bob Hill, a college, NBA, and international basketball coach. Hill has two brothers. The oldest, Cameron, is currently the head women's basketball coach at Trinity University in San Antonio and is the owner of CHB, specializing in player development and team training. The other brother, Chris, is the head basketball coach at Jesuit College Preparatory School of Dallas.
