= Paul Grant (basketball) =

American basketball player (born 1974)

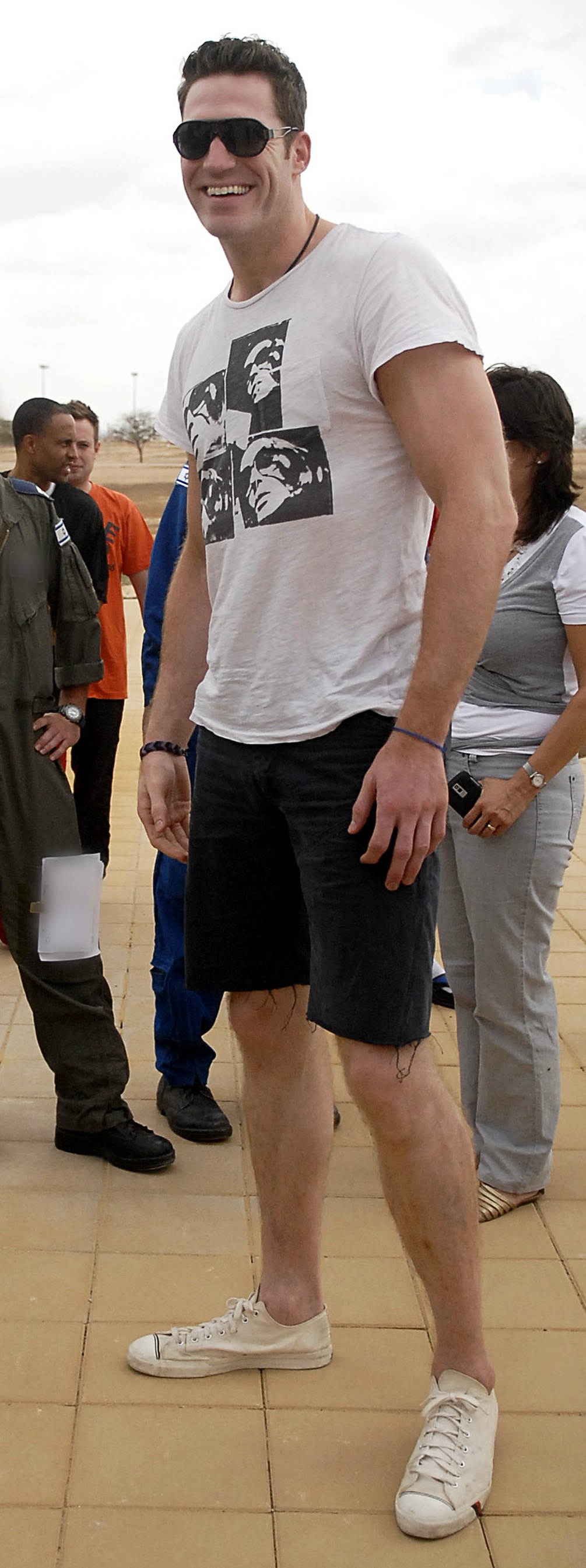

Personal information
- Born: January 6, 1974 (age 52) Pittsburgh, Pennsylvania, U.S.
- Listed height: 7 ft 0 in (2.13 m)
- Listed weight: 255 lb (116 kg)

Career information
- High school: Brother Rice (Birmingham, Michigan)
- College: Boston College (1992–1995); Wisconsin (1996–1997)
- NBA draft: 1997: 1st round, 20th overall pick
- Drafted by: Minnesota Timberwolves
- Playing career: 1997–2004
- Position: Center
- Number: 40, 7, 45
- Coaching career: 2007–present

Career history

Playing
- 1997–1999: Minnesota Timberwolves
- 1999: Milwaukee Bucks
- 1999–2000: Rockford Lightning
- 2000–2001: Indiana Legends
- 2000: Los Angeles Stars
- 2001–2003: Asheville Altitude
- 2003: NIS Vojvodina
- 2004: Utah Jazz

Coaching
- 2007–2013: MIT (assistant)

Career highlights
- All-NBDL Second Team (2002)
- Stats at NBA.com
- Stats at Basketball Reference

Paul Edward Grant (born January 6, 1974) is an American former professional basketball player. He was born in Pittsburgh, Pennsylvania.

== Early life and career ==
Grant attended Brother Rice High School in Michigan, and played at Boston College for three seasons, but then transferred to Wisconsin for his senior year. He was named honorable mention All-Big Ten after leading the Badgers in scoring, field goal percentage, and blocked shots. He also played in the Portsmouth Invitational Tournament and the Nike Desert Classic.

Grant was drafted by the Minnesota Timberwolves as the 20th pick in the 1997 NBA draft. He was on the injured list for his entire rookie season because of a stress fracture in his foot. He finally made his NBA debut on February 5, 1999, in a 110–92 win over the Denver Nuggets.

On March 11, 1999, he was traded to the Milwaukee Bucks with Stephon Marbury, Chris Carr and Bill Curley, in a three-way deal with the New Jersey Nets, for Terrell Brandon, Brian Evans, a 1999 first-round draft choice and a future first-round draft choice.

Grant played for the Rockford Lightning of the CBA in 1999–2000. During the 2000–01 season he played for both the Los Angeles Stars and the Indiana Legends of the ABA, then played for the Asheville Altitude of the NBDL in 2001–02. In January 2003 he signed with KK NIS Vojvodina from Serbia for the remainder of the season.

Grant participated in the 2002–03 and 2003–04 training camps with the Utah Jazz, who signed him on January 1, 2004; he was waived five days later. On January 8, he was signed to a 10-day contract with the Jazz. He coached workouts in Haverhill Massachusetts from 2005 to 2006, working with young players.

In 2007, Grant was named to the staff of the MIT Men's Basketball team as an assistant coach. On April 13, 2008, he assisted MIT associate head coach, Oliver Eslinger, at the NEBCA All-Star Game.
