= Ansu Sesay =

American basketball player (born 1976)

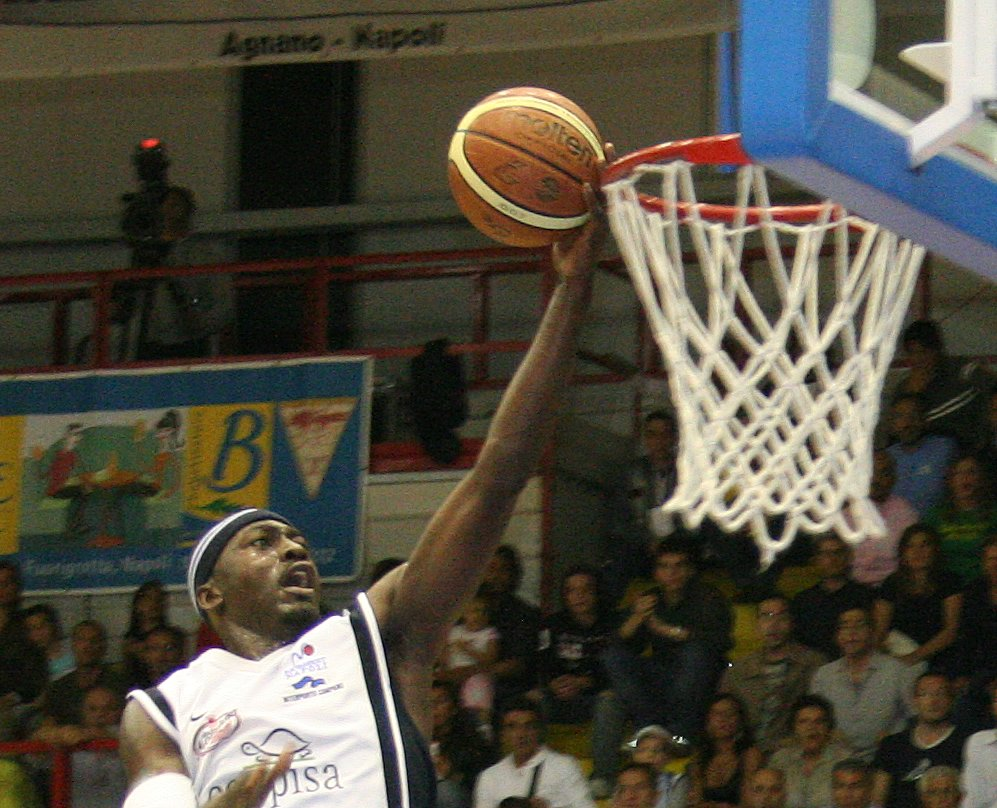
- Sesay playing for Eldo Napoli

Personal information
- Born: July 29, 1976 (age 50) Greensboro, North Carolina, U.S.
- Listed height: 6 ft 9 in (2.06 m)
- Listed weight: 225 lb (102 kg)

Career information
- High school: Willowridge (Houston, Texas)
- College: Ole Miss (1994–1998)
- NBA draft: 1998: 2nd round, 30th overall pick
- Drafted by: Dallas Mavericks
- Playing career: 1999–2010
- Position: Small forward
- Number: 45, 5, 4, 9, 17

Career history
- 1999–2000: Rockford Lightning
- 2000: Sta. Lucia Realtors
- 2000–2001: Quad City Thunder
- 2001–2002: Greenville Groove
- 2002–2004: Seattle SuperSonics
- 2004–2005: Golden State Warriors
- 2005: Roseto Basket
- 2005–2007: Basket Napoli
- 2007–2008: AJ Milano
- 2008–2010: Alba Berlin
- 2010: STB Le Havre
- 2010: Jahesh Tarabar Qom

Career highlights
- German Cup champion (2009); Italian Cup champion (2006); NBDL Most Valuable Player (2002); All-NBDL First Team (2002); Consensus second-team All-American (1998); SEC Player of the Year (1998); 2× First-team All-SEC (1997, 1998)
- Stats at NBA.com
- Stats at Basketball Reference
Medals
Men's basketball
Representing United States
Summer Universiade
Gold medal – first place	1997 Trapani	Team competition

Ansu Martin Sesay Jr. (born July 29, 1976) is an American former professional basketball player.

== High school and college career ==
Sesay attended Willowridge High School in Houston, Texas. He led his team to the school's first state title in basketball in 1994.

Sesay starred at University of Mississippi, where he was named first-team all-SEC during both his junior and senior seasons and was the SEC's player of the year during his senior year.

== NBA ==
Sesay was selected 30th overall by the Dallas Mavericks in the 1998 NBA draft. After the NBA's lockout ended, he tore his ACL during a condensed training camp and spent the entire 1999 season on the injured list. He then spent the 1999–2000 season in the CBA, playing 54 games for Rockford, where he averaged nearly 12 points and five boards per game.

The Mavericks invited Sesay back to camp in 2000 but early in the preseason was dealt along with guard Dana Barros to Detroit for forward Loy Vaught. The next day, the Pistons released Sesay, and he returned to the CBA, playing 13 games for Quad City and finishing with averages of 10.5 points and 5.6 rebounds per game.

He signed for a brief period in training camp with the Los Angeles Clippers on September 28, 2001, but did not see any official playing time with the team. He was cut after playing in just one game and was subsequently the second-round pick of the NBDL's Greenville Groove in the league's supplemental Draft. Playing for the NBDL's best team, Sesay displayed a multitude of talents and was one of the league's leaders in several categories, including scoring, rebounding, and assists. He was named first-team all-NBDL and the league's inaugural MVP, but the highpoint of Sesay's season had to be when he was called up on a 10-day contract by the Seattle SuperSonics on March 29, 2002, as injuries ravaged their roster. Though Sesay was expected to just be a warm body, he joined the team's rotation the next night in a win over the Portland Trail Blazers a night later, playing 12 minutes and scoring seven points in his NBA debut. Three nights later, still less than a week from the NBA's minor league, Sesay was playing 28 minutes against the Houston Rockets and was on the court down the stretch. Throughout the rest of the month, Sesay played intermittently as the Sonics clinched a playoff berth. When the second season started, the return to health of forwards Rashard Lewis and Vladimir Radmanovic put Sesay on the bench for only garbage minutes in the series' first games. After Lewis went out again midway through game three, Sesay became a key part of the team's game four rotation. His eight rebounds in 26 minutes helped out a 91–79 victory which forced a deciding game five.

Ansu Sesay impressed enough during his eight-game stint with the Sonics, on a 46.3% shooting, that he made his way onto the team's playoff roster and was part of Nate McMillan's postseason rotation. After the season, the Sonics re-signed the restricted free agent to a two-year deal, and Sesay was expected to be a part of the team's rotation. Sesay's season got off to a bad start when he strained his back during training camp, keeping him out of the majority of the Sonics preseason games. More of a concern in the long run for Sesay was his ability to make shots. By opening night, however, Sesay was in the lineup and played 16 minutes.

Sesay dropped off dramatically in the next season. During the month of November 2002, he shot 29%, and scarcely improved to 30% in December 2002. Nonetheless, he remained valuable and stayed in the rotation because of his defensive ability. Sesay had the ability to defend shooting guards, small forwards and power forwards, and he saw action at each of the three positions. A natural small forward, Sesay started at power forward during the month of January when the Sonics were without injured Vladimir Radmanovic. Playing more regularly, Sesay's touch began to return, and he shot 41.9% in January 2003 and an even 50% in February 2003.

The Sonics pair of trades at the trade deadline 2003 effectively ended Sesay's season. He was placed on the injured list with a lower back strain and remained there for the rest of the season. The Sonics missed his versatility during that period. In addition to the three positions mentioned above, the Sonics coaching staff also discussed playing Sesay at the point when backup Kenny Anderson was injured during the early part of the 2002–2003 season.

He went on to play for the Golden State Warriors (2004-January 2005).

He played 127 regular season NBA games with averages of 10.2 MPG, 3.2 PPG and 1.8 RPG on .434 field goal percentage and .640 free throw percentage in 10.2 minutes per game. He also appeared in 4 playoff games for the Sonics.

== Overseas ==
Sesay played in the Philippine Basketball Association for the Sta. Lucia Realtors in the summer of 2000, winning the Best Import award. He led the Realtors to their first Finals appearance on 2000, losing in 5 games to the San Miguel Beermen led by Stephen Howard.

In 2001, he also "served" a 1-day contract with Montepaschi Siena, not appearing in any games. In January 2005, he joined Italian league team Sedima Roseto (Jan-Jun 2005). From 2005 to 2007, Sesay stayed with Carpisa Napoli (Eldo Napoli in 2006–07), where he helped win the Italian Cup title in 2006.

In 2007–08, Sesay signed with another Italian team, Armani Jeans Milano, where he wore jersey number 4 and averaged 10.5 points, 4.9 rebounds and 1.4 steals in 14 Euroleague games. In August 2008, ALBA Berlin inked power forward Ansu Sesay to a one-year deal, with an option to extend it until the end of the 2009–10 season. Alba head coach stated that Sesay is the athletic power forward who can hit outside shots that they were looking for. Sesay wore jersey number 9 with Alba.

== Personal life ==
Sesay is of Sierra Leonan descent. Sesay has five children.
