= Lorenzo Coleman =

American basketball player

Personal information
- Born: September 9, 1975
- Died: November 24, 2013 (aged 38)
- Listed height: 7 ft 1 in (2.16 m)
- Listed weight: 264 lb (120 kg)

Career information
- College: Tennessee Tech (1993–1997)
- NBA draft: 1997: undrafted
- Position: Center

Career history
- 2001–2002: Roanoke Dazzle
- 2004–2006: Xinjiang Flying Tigers
- 2007: Zhejiang Golden Bulls

Lorenzo Coleman (September 9, 1975 −November 24, 2013) was an American basketball player.

== College career ==
Coleman played college basketball for Tennessee Tech for four years, and had 437 blocks in 114 games.

== Professional career ==
In the 2001 NBDL Supplemental Draft, Coleman was drafted first overall by the Roanoke Dazzle. He played 46 games for Roanoke in 2001–02 and led the NBDL in field goal percentage, at .606.

Coleman played for the Harlem Globetrotters in 2002.

== Death ==
Coleman died on November 24, 2013, at the age of 38 after suffering an aortic aneurysm a couple of weeks earlier.

== See also ==
- List of NCAA Division I men's basketball career blocks leaders
