= 2001–02 National Basketball Development League season =

2001–02 NBDL season
- League: NBDL
- Sport: Basketball

Draft
- Top draft pick: Chris Andersen
- Picked by: Fayetteville Patriots

Regular season
- Top seed: North Charleston Lowgators
- Season MVP: Ansu Sesay (Greenville Groove)
- Top scorer: Isaac Fontaine (Mobile Revelers) (17.4 ppg)

Finals
- Champions: Greenville Groove
- Runners-up: North Charleston Lowgators

NBA Development League seasons
- 2002–03 →

The 2001–02 NBDL season was the inaugural season for the National Basketball Development League. The league started with eight teams: Asheville Altitude, Columbus Riverdragons, Fayetteville Patriots, Greenville Groove, Huntsville Flight, Mobile Revelers, North Charleston Lowgators and Roanoke Dazzle. The season ended with the Groove defeating the Lowgators 2–0 in the best-of-three Finals series to win the inaugural NBDL championship.

== Regular season standings ==
| Team | W | L | PCT | GB |
|---|---|---|---|---|
| North Charleston Lowgators | 36 | 20 | .643 | — |
| Greenville Groove | 36 | 20 | .643 | — |
| Columbus Riverdragons | 31 | 25 | .554 | 5 |
| Mobile Revelers | 30 | 26 | .536 | 6 |
| Huntsville Flight | 26 | 30 | .464 | 10 |
| Asheville Altitude | 26 | 30 | .464 | 10 |
| Fayetteville Patriots | 21 | 35 | .375 | 15 |
| Roanoke Dazzle | 18 | 38 | .321 | 18 |

== Statistics leaders ==
| Category | Player | Team | Stat |
|---|---|---|---|
| Points per game | Isaac Fontaine | Mobile Revelers | 17.4 |
| Rebounds per game | Thomas Hamilton | Greenville Groove | 9.4 |
| Assists per game | Omar Cook | Fayetteville Patriots | 7.8 |
| Steals per game | Fred House | North Charleston Lowgators | 2.5 |
| Blocks per game | Lee Scruggs | Asheville Altitude | 2.1 |
| Field goal percentage | Lorenzo Coleman | Roanoke Dazzle | 60.6% |
| 3-pt field goal percentage | Terry Dehere | North Charleston Lowgators | 45.0% |
| Free throw percentage | Isaac Fontaine | Mobile Revelers | 90.5% |

Source: Basketball-Reference

== Season award winners ==
| Award | Winner | Team |
|---|---|---|
| Most Valuable Player | Ansu Sesay | Greenville Groove |
| Rookie of the Year | Fred House | North Charleston Lowgators |
| Defensive Player of the Year | Jeff Myers | Greenville Groove |
| Sportsmanship Award | Mike Wilks | Huntsville Flight |

=== All-NBDL Teams ===
- First Team:
  - Forward: Tremaine Fowlkes – Columbus Riverdragons
  - Forward: Ansu Sesay – Greenville Groove
  - Center: Thomas Hamilton – Greenville Groove
  - Guard: Isaac Fontaine – Mobile Revelers
  - Guard: Billy Thomas – Greenville Groove
- Second Team:
  - Forward: Derek Hood – Mobile Revelers
  - Forward: Sedric Webber – North Charleston Lowgators
  - Center: Paul Grant – Asheville Altitude
  - Guard: Omar Cook – Fayetteville Patriots
  - Guard: Terrell McIntyre – Fayetteville Patriots
- Honorable Mention:
  - Forward: Nate Johnson – Columbus Riverdragons
  - Forward: Rahim Lockhart – Greenville Groove
  - Forward: Gabe Muoneke – Columbus Riverdragons
  - Forward: Greg Stempin – Fayetteville Patriots
  - Center: Jeff Aubry – Fayetteville Patriots
  - Center: Eric Chenowith – Huntsville Flight
  - Guard: Nate Green – North Charleston Lowgators
  - Guard: Artie Griffin – Roanoke Dazzle
  - Guard: Fred House – North Charleston Lowgators
  - Guard: Jimmie Hunter – Huntsville Flight
  - Guard: Jeff Myers – Greenville Groove

Source: NBA.com

== Inaugural head coaches ==
- Asheville- Joey Meyer
- Columbus - Jeff Malone
- Fayetteville - Nate Archibald
- Greenville - Milton Barnes
- Huntsville - Bob Thornton
- Mobile - Sam Vincent
- North Charleston - Alex English
- Roanoke - Kent Davison

== Playoffs ==
There were only 8 teams in the league. For the playoffs, the four teams with the best record in the league were seeded one to four. Each round of the playoffs were played a best-of-three series.

Semifinals (Best-of-3)
2 | Greenville | 2
3 | Columbus | 1
1 | North Charleston | 2
4 | Mobile | 1

Finals (Best-of-3)
2 | Greenville | 2
1 | North Charleston | 0

List of Playoff games

- Semifinals
- March 28: Columbus 81, Greenville 78
- March 29: Greenville 96, Columbus 78
- April 6: Greenville 79, Columbus 78
- March 24: Mobile 78, North Charleston 75
- April 3: North Charleston 77, Mobile 70
- April 6: North Charleston 80, Mobile 78
- Finals
- April 8: Greenville 81, North Charleston 63
- April 10: Greenville 75, North Charleston 68

Greenville defeated North Charleston on April 10 to win the first NBDL championship.
