= San Diego Clippers (NBA G League) =

American professional basketball team of the NBA G League

- Conference: Western
- League: NBA G League
- Founded: 2017
- History: Agua Caliente Clippers of Ontario; 2017–2022; Ontario Clippers; 2022–2024; San Diego Clippers; 2024–present
- Arena: Frontwave Arena
- Location: Oceanside, California
- Team colors: Navy blue, red, pacific blue, silver
- General manager: Dee Brown
- Head coach: Paul Hewitt
- Ownership: Los Angeles Clippers
- Affiliation: Los Angeles Clippers
- Showcase Cup titles: 1 (2022)
- Website: sandiego.gleague.nba.com

The San Diego Clippers are an American professional basketball team in the NBA G League based in the San Diego County. They are affiliated with the Los Angeles Clippers, and play their home games at Frontwave Arena. The Clippers began play in the 2017–18 season.

== History ==
From 2009 to 2014, the L.A. Clippers had been affiliated with the former Bakersfield Jam (now the Motor City Cruise) before the Jam switched to a single affiliation with the Phoenix Suns. In December 2015, Doc Rivers, head coach of the Los Angeles Clippers, mentioned the need for the Clippers to own an NBA Development League team.

In April 2017, the Clippers were reported to be looking to add a minor-league affiliate in the NBA Development League either in nearby Ontario or Bakersfield for the 2017–18 season. In May 2017, the Clippers reportedly had settled on the Ontario location; possibly calling the team the Agua Caliente Clippers. On May 15, the Agua Caliente Clippers of Ontario were announced and the team played at Citizens Business Bank Arena. The team was named after the Agua Caliente Band of Cahuilla Indians, a federally recognized tribe with resorts and casinos in Palm Springs and were the presenting sponsor of the Clippers.

In 2021, Paul Hewitt was named the team's head coach. In the 2021–22 season, the Clippers appeared in the Western Conference Finals for the first time in franchise history.

On July 5, 2022, the team officially changed their name to the Ontario Clippers.

Ontario Clippers logo from 2022 to 2024

On December 22, 2022, the Clippers defeated the Windy City Bulls 99–97 to win the 2022 NBA G League Winter Showcase Cup.

On March 11, 2024, it was announced the Clippers would be relocating to the San Diego County city of Oceanside, rebranding as the San Diego Clippers, using its NBA affiliate's former identity from 1978 to 1984. The announcement was made at Frontwave Arena, a 7,500-capacity venue that serves as the team's new home arena.

Since moving to San Diego, the Clippers joined Halo Sports & Entertainment, Steve Ballmer's umbrella brand that also encompasses the Los Angeles Clippers, Intuit Dome, and the Kia Forum.

== Season-by-season ==
Season	Conference	Division	Regular season				Playoffs
Season	Conference	Division	Finish	Wins	Losses	Pct.	Playoffs
Agua Caliente Clippers
2017–18	Western	Pacific	5th	23	27	.460	
2018–19	Western	Pacific	3rd	26	24	.520	
2019–20	Western	Pacific	3rd	22	22	.500	Season cancelled by COVID-19 pandemic
2020–21	—	—	16th	5	10	.333	
2021–22	Western	—	2nd	22	11	.667	Won Conference Semifinal (South Bay) 112–110; Lost Conference Final (Rio Grande Valley) 114–125
Ontario Clippers
2022–23	Western	—	9th	17	15	.531	
2023–24	Western	—	12th	15	19	.441	
San Diego Clippers
2024–25	Western	—	13th	12	22	.353	
Regular-season record			142	150	.486		
Playoff record			1	1	.500		

== Current roster ==
San Diego Clippers roster
Players

Pos.	No.	Player	Height	Weight	DOB	From
G	27	Matt Allocco	6 ft 4 in (1.93 m)	197 lb (89 kg)	2001-01-08	Notre Dame
F/C	–	Daniel Batcho	6 ft 11 in (2.11 m)	235 lb (107 kg)	2002-01-10	Louisiana Tech
G	21	Desmond Cambridge Jr.	6 ft 4 in (1.93 m)	180 lb (82 kg)	1998-12-30	Arizona State
F	–	Zee Hamoda	6 ft 7 in (2.01 m)	170 lb (77 kg)	2002-01-20	Nicholls State
F	25	Vance Jackson	6 ft 9 in (2.06 m)	230 lb (104 kg)	1997-08-20	East Carolina
F	–	Nick Martinelli (TW)	6 ft 7 in (2.01 m)	220 lb (100 kg)	2004-04-20	Northwestern
G	–	Jalen Pickett (TW)	6 ft 2 in (1.88 m)	202 lb (92 kg)	1999-10-22	Penn State
G	9	Jason Preston	6 ft 3 in (1.91 m)	181 lb (82 kg)	1999-08-10	Ohio
G	45	Hunter Sallis	6 ft 4 in (1.93 m)	185 lb (84 kg)	2003-03-26	Wake Forest
C	–	Jamarion Sharp (TW)	7 ft 5 in (2.26 m)	235 lb (107 kg)	2001-08-26	Mississippi

Coaches
Head coach
- Paul Hewitt
Assistant(s)
- Tim Dather
- Taylor Hollowell
- Darnell Jackson

Legend
- (DP) Unsigned draft pick
- (FA) Free agent
- (S) Suspended
- (P) Prospects
- (NBA) On assignment from NBA affiliate
- (TW) Two-way affiliate player
- Injured

Roster
Updated: March 5, 2026

== Radio and television ==
Play-by-play broadcaster Brian S. Arrington and analyst Eddie Talbert Jr. of Fox Sports 1350 AM/Riverside comprise the television broadcast team.

== Head coaches ==
#	Head coach	Term	Regular season				Playoffs				Achievements
#	Head coach	Term	G	W	L	Win%	G	W	L	Win%	Achievements
1	Casey Hill	2017–2018	50	23	27	.460	—	—	—	—	
2	Brian Adams	2018–2020	50	26	24	.520	—	—	—	—	
3	Paul Hewitt	2021–present	80	44	36	.550	2	1	1	.500	

== NBA affiliates ==
=== San Diego Clippers ===
- Los Angeles Clippers (2024–present)

=== Ontario Clippers ===
- Los Angeles Clippers (2022–2024)

=== Agua Caliente Clippers of Ontario ===
- Los Angeles Clippers (2017–2022)
