= Fayetteville Patriots =

- League: NBA Development League
- Founded: 2001
- Folded: 2006
- History: Fayetteville Patriots; 2001–2006
- Arena: Cumberland County Crown Coliseum
- Location: Fayetteville, North Carolina
- Team colors: Red, navy blue, white
- Ownership: NBA
- Affiliations: Charlotte Bobcats; Detroit Pistons; New York Knicks
- Championships: none
- Division/conference titles: 1 (2002–03)
| Home | Away |

The Fayetteville Patriots were an NBA Development League team based in Fayetteville, North Carolina, United States.

== Franchise history ==
In 2001, the Fayetteville Patriots became one of the National Basketball Development League's eight charter franchises. Jeff Capel II was hired as coach. They played their home games at the Cumberland County Crown Coliseum in Fayetteville, North Carolina. The league would later re-brand as the NBA Development League (or D-League) in 2005.

Capel left after the 2004–05 season. The Patriots finished last in the D-League in the 2005–06 season with a 16–32 record. They got a lift in late February and early March, with the acquisition of Amir Johnson and Alex Acker from the Detroit Pistons. On May 2, 2006, the D-League decided to no longer field a team in Fayetteville. The announcement came a day after the league decided the same fate for the Roanoke Dazzle franchise, based in Roanoke, Virginia.

== Season-by-season ==
| Season | Regular Season | | | | Playoffs |
| Season | Finish | Wins | Losses | Pct. | Playoffs |
|---|---|---|---|---|---|
Fayetteville Patriots
| 2001–02 | 7th | 21 | 35 | .375 | |
| 2002–03 | 1st | 32 | 18 | .640 | Won Semifinals (Roanoke) 2–0; Lost D-League Finals (Mobile) 2–1 |
| 2003–04 | 4th | 21 | 25 | .457 | Lost Semifinals (Asheville) 116–111 |
| 2004–05 | 5th | 17 | 31 | .354 | |
| 2005–06 | 8th | 16 | 32 | .333 | |
| Regular Season Record | | 107 | 141 | .431 | 2001–2006 |
| Playoff Record | | 3 | 3 | .500 | 2001–2006 |

== Notable players ==
- Chris Andersen, first draft pick of the NBDL, first call-up to the NBA from the NBDL with the Denver Nuggets in 2001, 2013 NBA Finals champion with the Miami Heat; former New Orleans Hornet, Memphis Grizzly and Cleveland Cavalier
- Gerald Green, 2007 NBA Slam Dunk Contest Champion, former Minnesota Timberwolf, Dallas Maverick, New Jersey Net, Indiana Pacer, Phoenix Sun, Boston Celtic, Miami Heat, and Houston Rocket
- Mateen Cleaves, 2000 NCAA National Champion & Most Outstanding Player of the Final Four, former Detroit Piston, Sacramento King, Cleveland Cavalier, and Seattle SuperSonic
- Amir Johnson, former Detroit Piston, Toronto Raptor, and Boston Celtic
- Alex Acker, former Detroit Piston and Los Angeles Clipper
- Terrell McIntyre, former Italian Club "Mens Sana Basket" player
- Matt Barnes, former Orlando Magic, Los Angeles Clipper, Sacramento King, New York Knick, Philadelphia 76er, Golden State Warrior, Phoenix Sun, Los Angeles Laker and Sacramento King; won an NBA championship with the Golden State Warriors in 2017.
- Devin Brown, former San Antonio Spur, Denver Nugget, Utah Jazz, New Orleans Hornet, Cleveland Cavalier and Chicago Bull; won an NBA championship as a member of the Spurs in 2005

== NBA affiliates ==
- Charlotte Bobcats (2005–2006)
- Detroit Pistons (2005–2006)
- New York Knicks (2005–2006)
