= Florida Flame =

- League: NBA Development League
- Founded: 2001
- Folded: 2006
- History: North Charleston Lowgators; 2001–2003; Charleston Lowgators; 2003–2004; Florida Flame; 2004–2006
- Arena: Germain Arena
- Location: Fort Myers, Florida
- Team colors: Apple green, blue, orange
- Head coach: Jeff Malone
- Ownership: Flame Ownership Group; Scotty Gelt
- Affiliations: Boston Celtics; Miami Heat; Minnesota Timberwolves; Orlando Magic
- Championships: none

The Florida Flame was an NBA Development League team based in Fort Myers, Florida.

The Flame announced they would temporarily shut down operations during 2006–07, due to not having a home arena in which to play. The team maintained its league membership in hopes of finding a venue for the next season. When that didn't happen, the Flame quietly folded all operations in late 2007.

== Franchise history ==
The North Charleston Lowgators began play in the National Basketball Development League in 2001–02. Alex English served as the coach for the inaugural season. The team was renamed the Charleston Lowgators in the fall of 2003. The Charleston Lowgators relocated to Fort Myers in fall 2004 and became the Florida Flame. In September 2005, the NBA announced that the Flame would be affiliated with the Boston Celtics, Miami Heat, Minnesota Timberwolves, and Orlando Magic for the upcoming season.

== Players of note ==
- Kirk Haston
- Carl English
- Earl Barron
- Dorell Wright
- Gerald Green
- Dwayne Jones
- Andre Barrett
- Theron Smith
- Bracey Wright
- Smush Parker
- Chuck Eidson
- Tierre Brown
- Ime Udoka

=== Roster at end of 2005–06 season ===
Florida Flame Roster
Head Coach: Jeff Malone				(Mississippi State)
Asst. Coach: Terry Thimlar				(Indiana State)
PF	4	(Alabama)	Duane Erwin	(Memphis 2005)
C	5	(North Carolina)	George Leach	(Indiana 2004)
SG	6	(Texas)	Bracey Wright	(Indiana 2005)
SG/SF	7	(New York (state))	Lenny Stokes	(Cincinnati 2003)
PF/C	9	(Arkansas)	Roman Brown	(Florida Gulf Coast 2004)
SG/SF	10	(California)	Austin Nichols	(Humboldt State 2004)
PG	11	(New York (state))	Andre Barrett	(Seton Hall 2004)
PG	13	(Rhode Island)	T. J. Sorrentine	(Vermont 2005)
PG/SG	22	(California)	E. J. Rowland	(St. Mary's 2005)
SG	25	(North Carolina)	Jonathan Moore	(North Carolina Central 2005)
SG/SF	33	(Tennessee)	Reed Rawlings	(Samford 2001)
C/PF	34	(Virginia)	Elton Brown	(Virginia 2004)

== Year-by-year record ==
Season	Finish	Wins	Losses	Pct.	Postseason Results
North Charleston Lowgators
2001–02	1st	36	20	.643	Won Semifinals (Mobile) 2–1; Lost D-League Finals (Greenville) 2–0
2002–03	2nd	26	24	.520	Lost Semifinals (Mobile) 2–0
Charleston Lowgators
2003–04	2nd	27	19	.587	Lost Semifinals (Huntsville) 108–100
Florida Flame
2004–05	6th	17	31	.354	Missed playoffs
2005–06	3rd	25	23	.521	Lost Semifinals (Albuquerque) 80–71
Regular season		131	117	.528	
Playoffs		2	6	.250	

== NBA affiliates ==
=== Florida Flame ===
- Boston Celtics (2005–2006)
- Miami Heat (2005–2006)
- Minnesota Timberwolves (2005–2006)
- Orlando Magic (2005–2006)

=== Charleston Lowgators ===
- None
