= Oklahoma City Blue =

American minor league basketball team of the NBA G League

- Conference: Western
- League: NBA G League
- Founded: 2001
- History: Asheville Altitude; 2001–2005; Tulsa 66ers 2005–2014; Oklahoma City Blue; 2014–present
- Arena: Paycom Center
- Location: Oklahoma City, Oklahoma
- Team colors: Blue, sunset, navy blue, yellow
- General manager: D. J. White
- Head coach: Daniel Dixon
- Ownership: Professional Basketball Club LLC
- Affiliation: Oklahoma City Thunder
- Championships: 3 (2004, 2005, 2024)
- Website: oklahomacity.gleague.nba.com

The Oklahoma City Blue are an American professional basketball team in the NBA G League based in Oklahoma City. They are affiliated with the Oklahoma City Thunder, and play their home games at Paycom Center, an arena shared with the Thunder.

The franchise began as the Asheville Altitude in 2001 playing in Asheville, North Carolina, for four seasons. They won the 2004 and 2005 NBDL championship, becoming the first (and so far only) team to win consecutive league championships. After struggling with poor attendance, the franchise relocated to Tulsa, Oklahoma, and played nine seasons as the Tulsa 66ers. Before the 2014–15 season, the franchise relocated again to Oklahoma City, Oklahoma, becoming the Oklahoma City Blue. One of three teams still playing from the first league season, they are the oldest surviving NBA G League champion to play in the league.

== History ==
=== Asheville Altitude (2001–2005) ===
The franchise began in 2001 when NBA Commissioner David Stern and deputy commissioner Russ Granik formed the National Basketball Development League. Asheville, North Carolina was chosen to have one of the first eight franchises located in the southeastern United States. The franchise hired Joey Meyer and began their inaugural season in the 2001–02 season.

In its inaugural season, the Altitude had a 26–30 record, finishing sixth in the league. Center Paul Grant was named to the league's inaugural All-NBDL Second Team. After accumulating a 49–57 record after two seasons, the Altitude won back-to-back championships in its final two seasons in Asheville. Despite the Altitude's recent success, the franchise experienced poor attendance with fans often numbering in the dozens despite a 5,000 seat capacity. In its first four seasons, the Altitude averaged 788 fans a game and suffered at least $100,000 in losses.

After the 2004–05 season, team president Rudy Bourg announced the Altitude had been sold to an independent ownership group and would relocate prior to the start of next season.

=== Tulsa 66ers (2005–2014) ===
Before the start of the 2005–06 season, the league announced expansion to the southwest United States with Tulsa, Oklahoma being chosen as a host city. Initially planned to being independently owned and operated by the league, Southwest Basketball, LLC, operated by owner David Kahn, purchased the Altitude and relocated the franchise to Tulsa. The franchise also rebranded and was renamed to the Tulsa 66ers, in honor of the U.S. Route 66 which runs through the city and the state of Oklahoma. Starting in 2005, the National Basketball Association announced an affiliation and assignment system for the league. Under the system, the 66ers were directly affiliated with the Chicago Bulls, Indiana Pacers, Milwaukee Bucks and the New Orleans Hornets. Prior to the start of the 2006–07 season, the franchise's affiliation with the Bulls and Pacers ended with the addition of the New York Knicks. Before the relocation of the Oklahoma City Thunder, the franchise had its final affiliations with the Bucks, Knicks, and the Dallas Mavericks during the 2007–08 season.

On August 1, 2008, the newly relocated Oklahoma City Thunder agreed to purchase the 66ers for $2.25 million, becoming only the third NBA franchise to own a D-League team. In the agreement, the Thunder owned full control of the team's business and basketball operations and became the sole affiliate of the Thunder.

=== Oklahoma City Blue (2014–present) ===
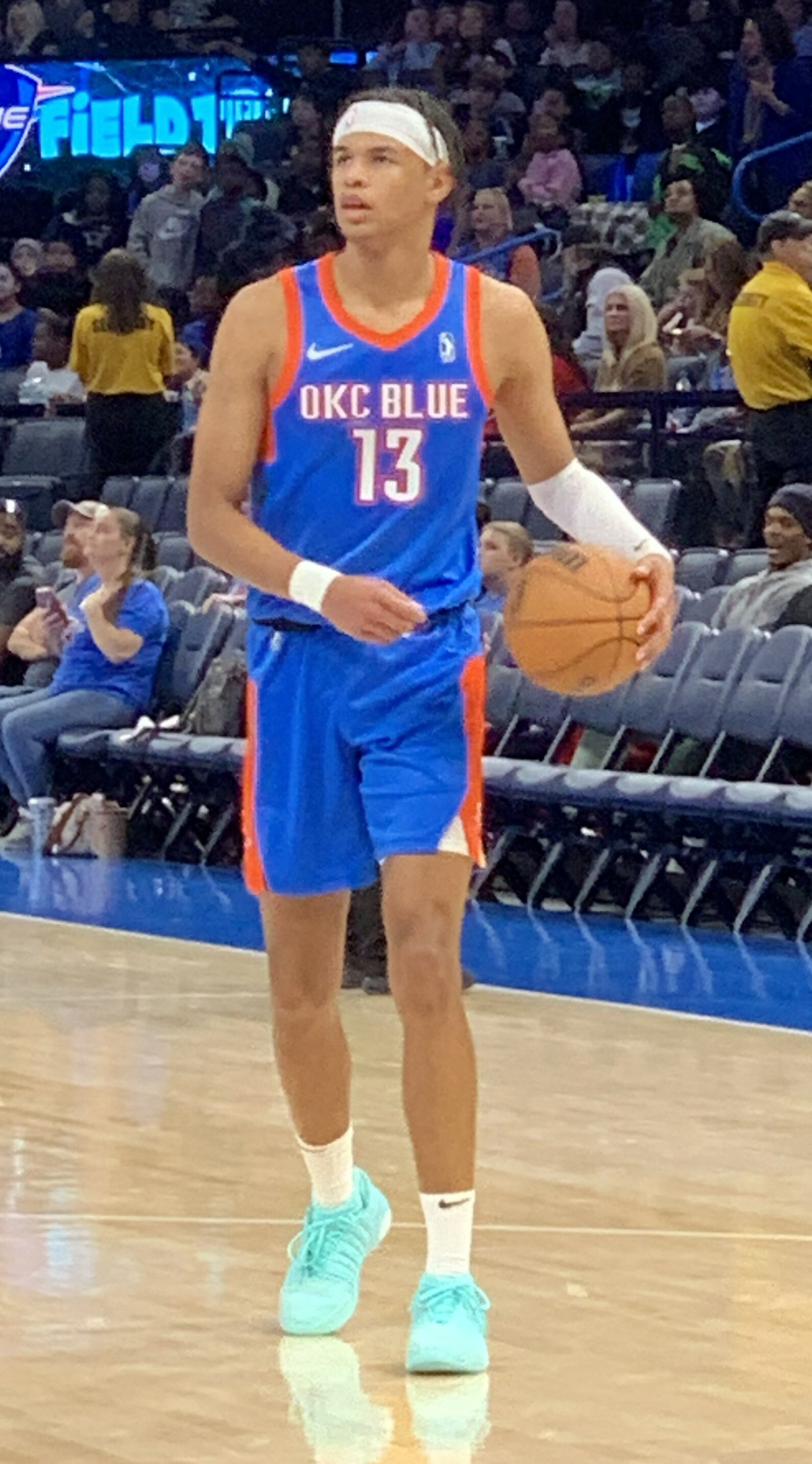
Ousmane Dieng was named NBA G League Finals MVP in 2024.

After getting offers from four venues, Professional Basketball Club felt none were suitable and announced the 66ers would move to Oklahoma City and play in the Cox Convention Center across the street from the Chesapeake Energy Arena where the parent club Oklahoma City Thunder plays starting with the 2014–15 season. The team's front offices are located in the Chesapeake Energy Arena along with the rest of the front office staff of the parent club Oklahoma City Thunder. With the move, the team was rebranded from the 66ers to the Blue. In the 2016–17 season, the team was the regular season Western Conference champion with 34 wins, a franchise record.

In 2021, the Cox Convention Center was leased to a film production company and the arena was closed to become Prairie Surf Studios. The Blue then moved into their parent team's home arena, the Paycom Center (then recently renamed from Chesapeake Energy Arena) in 2021.

==== 2023–2024: First championship in Oklahoma City ====
Headed into the 2023–24 season, the Blue finished the regular season with a 21–13 record and qualified for the playoffs for the first time since the 2018–19 season. Entering the playoffs as the third seed, the Blue defeated Rio Grande Valley Vipers in the first round in a 126–125 overtime win behind Ousmane Dieng's game winner. Advancing into the semifinals, the Blue defeated Sioux Falls Skyforce in a 111–93 win after winning the fourth quarter 34–18 to advance to the conference finals for the first time since 2019. Facing off against the top-seeded Stockton Kings, the Blue outscored the Kings by 24 points to lead 58–45 at halftime. Despite a late comeback, the Blue won 114–107 and advanced to their second-ever G League Finals since the team was known as the Tulsa 66ers. In the best-of-three series against Maine Celtics, the Blue split the first two games, with both teams winning at home. In the decisive game three, the Blue built on an early lead and outscored the Celtics by 16 points to hold a 63–40 halftime lead. After a back-and-forth third quarter, the Blue led 92–67 entering the fourth quarter. Behind Dieng and Jahmi'us Ramsey, the Blue won its first-ever championship, defeating the Celtics 117–100, clinching their first championship since becoming the only affiliate for the Oklahoma City Thunder. Thunder assignment Ousmane Dieng was named NBA G League Finals MVP after scoring 25 points, 6 rebounds, 4 assists, and 2 blocks.

== Season-by-season record ==
Season	Regular season				Playoffs			
Season	W	L	W–L%	Finish	W	L	W–L%	Finish
Asheville Altitude
2001–02	26	30	.464	6th	—	—	—	Missed playoffs
2002–03	23	27	.460	7th	—	—	—	Missed playoffs
2003–04	28	18	.609	1st	2	0	1.000	Won D-League Championship
2004–05	27	21	.563	2nd	2	0	1.000	Won D-League Championship
Tulsa 66ers
2005–06	24	24	.500	T-5th	—	—	—	Missed playoffs
2006–07	21	29	.420	4th	—	—	—	Missed playoffs
2007–08	26	24	.520	3rd	—	—	—	Missed playoffs
2008–09	15	35	.300	5th	—	—	—	Missed playoffs
2009–10	27	23	.540	5th	2	1	.667	Lost D-League Finals
2010–11	33	17	.660	3rd	1	1	.500	Lost in Semifinals
2011–12	23	27	.460	6th	—	—	—	Missed playoffs
2012–13	27	23	.540	3rd	1	1	.500	Lost in Semifinals
2013–14	24	26	.480	5th	—	—	—	Missed playoffs
Oklahoma City Blue
2014–15	28	22	.560	2nd	0	1	.000	Lost in First Round
2015–16	19	31	.380	4th	—	—	—	Missed playoffs
2016–17	34	16	.680	1st	1	1	.500	Lost in Conference Finals
2017–18	28	22	.560	1st	0	1	.000	Lost in First Round
2018–19	34	16	.680	1st	1	1	.500	Lost in Semifinals
2019–20	20	22	.476	3rd	—	—	—	Season cancelled
2020–21	8	7	.533	9th	—	—	—	Missed playoffs
2021–22	15	20	.429	10th	—	—	—	Missed playoffs
2022–23	13	19	.406	10th	—	—	—	Missed playoffs
2023–24	21	13	.618	3rd	5	1	.833	Won G League Championship
2024–25	18	16	.529	7th	—	—	—	Missed playoffs
2025–26	12	24	.333	13th	—	—	—	Missed playoffs

== Players and personnel ==
=== Current roster ===
Oklahoma City Blue roster
Players

Pos.	No.	Player	Height	Weight	DOB	From
F	12	Jabri Abdur-Rahim	6 ft 8 in (2.03 m)	220 lb (100 kg)	2002–03–22	Providence
G	16	Zack Austin	6 ft 5 in (1.96 m)	216 lb (98 kg)	2001-08-11	Pittsburgh
G	23	Brooks Barnhizer (TW)	6 ft 6 in (1.98 m)	227 lb (103 kg)	2002-03-02	Northwestern
G	35	Buddy Boeheim	6 ft 5 in (1.96 m)	205 lb (93 kg)	1999-11-11	Syracuse
G	–	Josh Dix (TW)	6 ft 6 in (1.98 m)	210 lb (95 kg)	2004-06-29	Creighton
G	–	Otega Oweh (TW)	6 ft 4 in (1.93 m)	215 lb (98 kg)	2003-06-21	Kentucky
C	98	Seth Maxwell	7 ft 0 in (2.13 m)	235 lb (107 kg)	1998-11-21	Indiana Wesleyan
G	5	Anthony Pritchard	6 ft 2 in (1.88 m)	185 lb (84 kg)	2003–05–06	Central Michigan
SG	40	Zhaire Smith	6 ft 4 in (1.93 m)	205 lb (93 kg)	1999-06-04	Texas Tech
G	11	Bryce Thompson	6 ft 5 in (1.96 m)	200 lb (91 kg)	2002–02–26	Oklahoma State

Coaches
Head coach
- Daniel Dixon
Assistant(s)
- Bryce Alford
- Ryan Greer
- Ellie Mack

Legend
- (DP) Unsigned draft pick
- (FA) Free agent
- (S) Suspended
- (P) Prospects
- (NBA) On assignment from NBA affiliate
- (TW) Two-way affiliate player
- Injured

Roster
Updated: April 12, 2026

=== Head coaches ===
#	Name	Years	Regular season				Playoffs				Achievements
#	Name	Years	GC	W	L	W–L%	GC	W	L	W–L%	Achievements
Asheville Altitude
1	Joey Meyer	2001–2008	348	175	173	.503	4	4	0	1.000	2 Championships (2004, 2005)
Tulsa 66ers
2	Paul Woolpert	2008–2009	50	15	35	.300	—	—	—	—	—
3	Nate Tibbetts	2009–2011	100	60	40	.600	13	6	7	.462	—
4	Dale Osbourne	2011–2012	50	23	27	.460	—	—	—	—	—
5	Darko Rajaković	2012–2014	100	51	49	.510	5	2	3	.400	—
Oklahoma City Blue
6	Mark Daigneault	2014–2019	250	143	107	.572	11	4	7	.364	3 Coach of the Month awards
7	Grant Gibbs	2019–2022	92	43	49	.467	—	—	—	—	—
8	Kameron Woods	2022–2025	100	52	48	.520	6	5	1	.857	1 Championship (2024)
9	Daniel Dixon	2025–present	—	—	—	—	—	—	—	—	—

== NBA affiliates ==
=== Asheville Altitude ===
- None

=== Tulsa 66ers ===
- Chicago Bulls (2005–2006)
- Dallas Mavericks (2007–2008)
- Indiana Pacers (2005–2006)
- Milwaukee Bucks (2005–2008)
- New Orleans/Oklahoma City Hornets (2005–2007)
- New York Knicks (2006–2008)
- Oklahoma City Thunder (2008–2014)

=== Oklahoma City Blue ===
- Oklahoma City Thunder (2014–present)
