= 2002–03 National Basketball Development League season =

- League: National Basketball Development League
- Sport: Basketball

Draft
- Top draft pick: Mikki Moore
- Picked by: Roanoke Dazzle

Regular season
- Top seed: Fayetteville Patriots
- Season MVP: Devin Brown (Greenville Groove)
- Top scorer: Nate Johnson (Columbus Riverdragons) (19.5 ppg)

Finals
- Champions: Mobile Revelers
- Runners-up: Fayetteville Patriots

NBA Development League seasons
- ← 2001–02 2003–04 →

The 2002–03 NBDL season was the second for the National Basketball Development League. The season ended with the Mobile Revelers defeating the Fayetteville Patriots 2 games to 1 to win their first and only NBDL Championship.

== Regular season standings ==
Team	W	L	PCT	GB
Fayetteville Patriots	32	18	.640	—
North Charleston Lowgators	26	24	.520	6
Mobile Revelers	26	24	.520	6
Roanoke Dazzle	26	24	.520	6
Asheville Altitude	23	27	.460	9
Columbus Riverdragons	23	27	.460	9
Greenville Groove	22	28	.440	10
Huntsville Flight	22	28	.440	10

== Season award winners ==
Award	Winner	Team
NBDL Most Valuable Player	Devin Brown	Fayetteville Patriots
NBDL Rookie of the Year	Devin Brown	Fayetteville Patriots
NBDL Defensive Player of the Year	Mikki Moore	Roanoke Dazzle

=== League leaders ===
- Cory Alexander: Roanoke Dazzle, Minutes Played (1794)
- Nate Johnson: Columbus Riverdragons, Field Goals (354)
- Nate Johnson: Columbus Riverdragons, Field Goal Attempts (759)
- Peter Cornell: North Charleston Lowgators, Field Goal Pct. (.594)
- Billy Thomas: Greenville Groove, 3-Pt Field Goals (84)
- Billy Thomas: Greenville Groove, 3-Pt Field Goal Attempts (241)
- Isaac Fontaine: Mobile Revelers, 3-Pt Field Goal Pct. (.442)
- Nate Johnson: Columbus Riverdragons, Free Throws (225)
- Terrence Shannon: Roanoke Dazzle, Free Throw Attempts (321)
- Jason Capel: Fayetteville Patriots, Free Throw Pct. (.885)
- Rodney Bias: Huntsville Flight, Offensive Rebounds (153)
- Tang Hamilton: Columbus Riverdragons, Defensive Rebounds (310)
- Tang Hamilton: Columbus Riverdragons, Total Rebounds (452)
- Cory Alexander: Roanoke Dazzle, Assists (306)
- Jeff Trepagnier: Asheville Altitude, Steals (111)
- Jeff Aubry: Fayetteville Patriots, Blocks (70)
- Cory Alexander: Roanoke Dazzle, Turnovers (198)
- Jameel Watkins: Fayetteville Patriots, Personal Fouls (196)
- Nate Johnson: Columbus Riverdragons, Points (955)
- Cory Alexander: Roanoke Dazzle, Minutes per game (35.9)
- Nate Johnson: Columbus Riverdragons, Points per game (19.5)
- Tang Hamilton: Columbus Riverdragons, Rebounds per game (9.0)
- Cory Alexander: Roanoke Dazzle, Assists per game (6.1)
- Jeff Trepagnier: Asheville Altitude, Steals per game (2.3)
- Karim Shabazz: North Charleston Lowgators, Blocks per game (1.8)

== Playoffs ==
There were only 8 teams in the league. For the playoffs, the four teams with the best record in the league were seeded one to four. Each round of the playoffs were played a best-of-three series.

Semifinals (Best-of-3)
1	Fayetteville	2
4	Roanoke	0
3	Mobile	2
2	North Charleston	0

NBDL Championship (Best-of-3)
1	Fayetteville	1
3	Mobile	2

Mobile beats Fayetteville in three games to win the championship.

- Semifinals (Best of 3)
- March 25: Fayetteville 101, Roanoke 88
- March 30: Fayetteville 78, Roanoke 77
- March 28: Mobile 88, North Charleston 79
- March 30: North Charleston 69, Mobile 81
- Finals (Best of 3)
- April 4: Mobile 92, Fayetteville 82
- April 9: Fayetteville 77, Mobile 71
- April 11: Mobile 75, Fayetteville 72
