= Greenville Groove =

- League: NBA Development League
- Founded: 2001
- Folded: 2003
- History: Greenville Groove; 2001–2003
- Arena: BI-LO Center
- Location: Greenville, South Carolina
- Team colors: Green and Blue
- Head coach: Milton Barnes (2001-02); Tree Rollins (2002-03)
- Ownership: Carl Scheer
- Affiliation: None
- Championships: 1 NBA D-League (2002)
Home	Away	Third

The Greenville Groove were a National Basketball Development League (NBDL) team based in Greenville, South Carolina. Playing their home games at the BI-LO Center (now the Bon Secours Wellness Arena), the Groove was a charter franchise of the league, which had four teams based in the Carolinas. They were the league champions for the inaugural 2001–02 season but the team folded after the 2002–03 season.

The National Basketball Association (NBA) announced the Groove as one of the NBDL's charter franchises in July 2001. On August 16, 2001, the team announced that Stephanie Ready would serve as the team's lone assistant coach in becoming the first woman to serve as a coach on an all-male professional basketball team. Milton Barnes served as head coach of the first season and won the championship before leaving to become coach of the Harlem Globetrotters. The team had won the inaugural NBDL title in defeating the North Charleston Lowgators two games to zero.

Tree Rollins was tapped to serve as the new head coach. However, the league contracted the franchise in June 2003. Its contraction was carried out by the league due to low attendance and increasing operating losses.

== Season by season ==
Season	Finish	Wins	Losses	Pct.	Postseason Results
Greenville Groove
2001–02	2nd	36	20	.640	Won Semifinals (Columbus) 2–1; Won D-League Finals (North Charleston) 2–0
2002–03	7th	22	28	.440	
Regular season		58	48	.547	
Playoffs		4	1	.800	

== NBA affiliates ==
- None
