= Mobile Revelers =

- League: National Basketball Development League
- Founded: 2001
- Folded: 2003
- History: Mobile Revelers; 2001–2003
- Arena: Mobile Civic Center
- Location: Mobile, Alabama
- Team colors: Purple, dark green
- Head coach: Sam Vincent
- Ownership: MVP Sports Entertainment
- Championships: 1 (2003)

The Mobile Revelers were a National Basketball Development League (NBDL) team based in Mobile, Alabama. Playing their home games at the Mobile Civic Center, the Revelers was a charter franchise in the 2001-02 season and folded after the 2002-03 season. The team was named after the people who took part in Mardi Gras parades as the Mardi Gras tradition started in Mobile.

The National Basketball Association (NBA) announced the Revelers as one of the NBDL charter franchises in July 2001. Sam Vincent coached both seasons of the team. In 2003, the Revelers won the League championship, defeating the Fayetteville Patriots, two games to one. However the league contracted the franchise on June 13, 2003.

== Season-by-season ==
Season	Regular season				Playoffs
Season	Finish	Wins	Losses	Pct.	Playoffs
Mobile Revelers
2001–02	4th	30	26	.540	Lost Semifinals (North Charleston) 1–2
2002–03	3rd	26	24	.520	Won Semifinals (North Charleston) 2–0; Won NBDL Finals (Fayetteville) 1–2
Regular season record		56	50	.514	2001–2003
Playoff record		5	3	.625	2001–2003

== NBA affiliates ==
- None
