= NBA G League =

Men's basketball minor league

- Current season, competition or edition: 2025–26 NBA G League season
- The NBA G League's logo
- Formerly: NBA D-League
- Sport: Basketball
- Founded: 2001
- First season: 2001–02
- President: Shareef Abdur-Rahim
- No. of teams: 31
- Countries: United States (29 teams); Canada (1 team); Mexico (1 team)
- Continents: North America
- Most recent champions: Greensboro Swarm (1st title)
- Most titles: Rio Grande Valley Vipers (4 titles)
- Broadcasters: United States: ESPN/ABC; Amazon Prime Video/Twitch; NBA TV; Canada: NBA TV Canada; Worldwide: GLeague.NBA.com
- Sponsor: Gatorade
- Website: gleague.nba.com

The NBA G League, or simply the G League, is a professional basketball league in North America that serves as the developmental league of the National Basketball Association (NBA). The league comprises 31 teams; as of the 2026–27 season, all are single-affiliated or owned by an NBA team except for the independent Mexico City Capitanes.

The league was founded in 2001 as the National Basketball Development League (NBDL), renamed the NBA Development League (NBA D-League) in 2005. It received its present name in 2017 under a deal with Gatorade, becoming the first U.S. professional sports league named for an advertiser.

Initially eight teams, the league expanded after 2005 under a plan by NBA commissioner David Stern, Russ Granik, Bobby Sharma, and other league executives, to develop it into a true minor-league farm system, with each team affiliated with one or more NBA teams. By mid-2014, one-third of NBA players had spent time in the league, up from 23% in 2011.

== History ==
=== National Basketball Development League (2001–2005) ===
On June 13, 2000, NBA commissioner David Stern and deputy commissioner Russ Granik announced the formation of the National Basketball Development League, to begin play in November 2001, with players required to be at least twenty years old. This was not the first time the league had their own minor league system, as they had used the Continental Basketball Association (CBA) as a developmental league for over two decades. The NBA had attempted to buy the CBA in March 2000, but they were rejected.

The league began its play as the National Basketball Development League (NBDL) in the 2001–02 season; the eight franchises were all located in the Southeastern United States (in Virginia, North Carolina, South Carolina, Alabama, and Georgia). Each team logo was given NBDL branding that was differentiated by team colors.

Eight players were called up to the NBA during the season, which included Chris Andersen, the first player drafted by a NBDL team. The league made sponsorship deals with Reebok and television broadcasting deals with ESPN2 and Fox Sports South to broadcast select games during the first season (such as the NBDL Finals), which made them one of few minor league operations to have nationally televised games. The Greenville Groove won the first NBDL championship on April 8, 2002, after winning game 2 over the North Charleston Lowgators. The league saw an average attendance of 1,640 fans per game, lower than what the NBA expected.

=== NBA Development League (2005–2017) ===
In 2005, the league's name was changed to NBA Development League (NBA D-League) as part of the new collective bargaining agreement with the NBA and a bid to appeal to more fans by showing the connection to the NBA. In the same offseason, Southwest Basketball, LLC led by David Kahn received league permission to operate four new teams. Southwest Basketball purchased three existing franchises and one expansion team: the Albuquerque Thunderbirds, Austin Toros, Fort Worth Flyers, and Tulsa 66ers. The Arkansas RimRockers were also added from the ABA for the 2005–06 season. In February 2006, the D-League expanded to California with the addition of the Bakersfield Jam. Two months later, the league announced that four teams from the CBA were joining the league: the Dakota Wizards, Sioux Falls Skyforce, Idaho Stampede, and a team originally slated for CBA expansion, the Colorado 14ers. Shortly after, the league announced expansion teams in the Anaheim Arsenal and the Los Angeles D-Fenders. The D-Fenders were the first D-League team to be directly owned by an NBA parent team, the Los Angeles Lakers.

However, the westward expansion contributed to the contraction of the NBA-owned Roanoke Dazzle and Fayetteville Patriots for that season. The Florida Flame suspended operations due to arena scheduling difficulties. After the 2006–07 season, there would be no more teams in the southeastern United States until the 2016 expansion team, the Greensboro Swarm. After the 2006 to 2009 expansions, the league membership was fairly consistent, with few moves or suspensions.

In 2009, the Houston Rockets entered the first single-affiliation partnership, called the "hybrid model", with the Rio Grande Valley Vipers. More NBA and D-League teams soon followed, signing single-affiliation agreements in hybrid and parent-team-owned varieties. With more NBA involvement, the league once again began to expand.

By 2015, the last multiple-affiliate team, the Fort Wayne Mad Ants (now the Noblesville Boom), was purchased by the Indiana Pacers, leading to the first season where all D-League teams were affiliated with only one NBA team. The remaining NBA teams began purchasing expansion franchises or hybrid partnership teams and placing them near the parent team. In 2015, the Toronto Raptors placed their Raptors 905 in Mississauga, Ontario, in the Greater Toronto Area. In 2016, the D-League added three NBA-parent-owned teams, the league's largest expansion since 2007: the Charlotte Hornets' Greensboro Swarm, the Brooklyn Nets' Long Island Nets, and the Chicago Bulls' Windy City Bulls.

=== NBA G League (2017–present) ===
Before the 2017–18 season, Gatorade paid the D-League to rename itself the NBA Gatorade League, which was officially shortened to "NBA G League" before the season. The league moved the Erie BayHawks to Lakeland, Florida, as the Lakeland Magic, a new Erie BayHawks franchise. It added the Agua Caliente Clippers in Ontario, California (now the San Diego Clippers); the Memphis Hustle in Southaven, Mississippi; and the Wisconsin Herd in Oshkosh, Wisconsin. The Los Angeles D-Fenders were renamed the South Bay Lakers.

In December 2017, the NBA and the live-streaming website Twitch announced that they would broadcast G League games on Twitch. Games have also been aired on the ESPN+ subscription service.

For the 2019–20 season, the G League began to offer select contracts to players who are not yet eligible to enter the NBA draft. Since 2006, players must be at least 19 years old by the end of the calendar year, creating what became known as the one-and-done rule where players would play one season of college basketball and then leave for the NBA. The new select contract was an alternative for players who do not want to or cannot attend a college, with players earning up to $125,000 per season. The league launched its prospects team, the NBA G League Ignite, in 2020. The G-League Ignite team folded after the 2023–24 season.

Following the COVID-19 pandemic-curtailed 2019–20 season, the G League postponed the start of the following season. In January 2021, the league announced it would play all games at Walt Disney World in Orlando, Florida, using the same isolation bubble as the 2020 NBA Bubble. Many teams opted out of participation, with only 17 of the 28 teams from the 2019–20 season plus the new Ignite prospects team choosing to take part in the abbreviated bubble season beginning in February 2021.

== Teams ==
- Eastern Conference
- Western Conference

=== Current teams ===
Eastern Conference
Team	City	Pod	Arena	Capacity	Founded	Joined	Head coach	NBA affiliate
Capital City Go-Go	Washington, D.C.	East	CareFirst Arena	4,200	2018		Cody Toppert	Washington Wizards
Cleveland Charge	Cleveland, Ohio	Central	Public Auditorium	10,000	2001 (Note: As the Huntsville Flight)		Eli Kell-Abrams	Cleveland Cavaliers
College Park Skyhawks	College Park, Georgia	East	Gateway Center Arena	3,500	2017 (Note: As the Erie BayHawks)		Steve Klei	Atlanta Hawks
Delaware Blue Coats	Wilmington, Delaware	East	Chase Fieldhouse	2,500	2007 (Note: As the Utah Flash)		JP Clark	Philadelphia 76ers
Grand Rapids Gold	Grand Rapids, Michigan	Central	Van Andel Arena	11,500	2006 (Note: As the Anaheim Arsenal)		Ryan Bowen	Denver Nuggets
Greensboro Swarm	Greensboro, North Carolina	South	Novant Health Fieldhouse	2,500	2016		D.J. Bakker	Charlotte Hornets
Laketown Squadron	Kenner, Louisiana	South	Pontchartrain Center	4,600	2019		Joe Barrer	New Orleans Pelicans
Long Island Nets	Uniondale, New York	East	Nassau Coliseum	13,500	2016		Mfon Udofia	Brooklyn Nets
Maine Celtics	Portland, Maine	East	Portland Exposition Building	3,100	2009		Phil Pressey	Boston Celtics
Motor City Cruise	Detroit, Michigan	Central	Wayne State Fieldhouse	3,000	2003 (Note: As the Long Beach Jam in the American Basketball Association. Joined the D-League as the Bakersfield Jam in 2006.)	2006	Steve Scalzi	Detroit Pistons
Noblesville Boom	Noblesville, Indiana	Central	Riverview Health Arena at Innovation Mile	3,400	2007 (Note: As the Fort Wayne Mad Ants from 2007-2023 and the Indiana Mad Ants from 2023-2025.)		Tom Hankins	Indiana Pacers
Osceola Magic	Kissimmee, Florida	South	Silver Spurs Arena	8,000	2008		Dylan Murphy	Orlando Magic
Raptors 905	Mississauga, Ontario	East	Mississauga Sports and Entertainment Centre	5,000	2015		Drew Jones	Toronto Raptors
Westchester Knicks	White Plains, New York	East	Westchester County Center	5,000	2014		DeSagana Diop	New York Knicks
Windy City Bulls	Hoffman Estates, Illinois	Central	Now Arena	10,000	2016		Quincy Pondexter	Chicago Bulls
Wisconsin Herd	Oshkosh, Wisconsin	Central	Oshkosh Arena	3,500	2017		Beno Udrih	Milwaukee Bucks

Western Conference
Team	City	Pod	Arena	Capacity	Founded	Joined	Head coach	NBA affiliate
Austin Spurs	Cedar Park, Texas	South	H-E-B Center at Cedar Park	7,200	2001 (Note: As the Columbus Riverdragons)		Chris Kent	San Antonio Spurs
Coachella Valley Lakers	Thousand Palms, California	West	Acrisure Arena	11,000	2006 (Note: As the Los Angeles D-Fenders; did not field a team for the 2010–11 season.)		Zach Guthrie	Los Angeles Lakers
Iowa Wolves	Des Moines, Iowa	Central	Casey's Center	16,110	2007		Ernest Scott	Minnesota Timberwolves
Memphis Hustle	Southaven, Mississippi	South	Landers Center	8,362	2017		Rob Sanicola	Memphis Grizzlies
Mexico City Capitanes	Mexico City, Mexico	South	Mexico City Arena	22,300	2017	2021	Vitor Galvani	None
Oklahoma City Blue	Oklahoma City, Oklahoma	West	Paycom Center	18,203	2001 (Note: As the Asheville Altitude)		Daniel Dixon	Oklahoma City Thunder
Rio Grande Valley Vipers	Edinburg, Texas	South	Bert Ogden Arena	9,000	2007		Joseph Blair	Houston Rockets
Rip City Remix	Portland, Oregon	West	Chiles Center	4,852	2023		Jonah Herscu	Portland Trail Blazers
Salt Lake City Stars	West Valley City, Utah	West	Maverik Center	12,500	1997 (Note: Played as the Idaho Stampede in the Continental Basketball Association before joining the NBA D-League in 2006.)	2006	Rick Higgins	Utah Jazz
San Diego Clippers	Oceanside, California	West	Frontwave Arena	7,500	2017 (Note: As the Agua Caliente Clippers of Ontario)		Paul Hewitt	Los Angeles Clippers
Santa Cruz Warriors	Santa Cruz, California	West	Kaiser Permanente Arena	2,505	1995 (Note: As the Dakota Wizards; played in the International Basketball Association and the Continental Basketball Association before joining the NBA D-League in 2006.)	2006	Lainn Wilson	Golden State Warriors
Sioux Falls Skyforce	Sioux Falls, South Dakota	Central	Sanford Pentagon	3,250	1989 (Note: Played in the Continental Basketball Association and the International Basketball League (1999–2001) before joining the NBA D-League in 2006.)	2006	Mario Casamajor	Miami Heat
Stockton Kings	Stockton, California	West	Adventist Health Arena	11,193	2008 (Note: As the Reno Bighorns)		Will Scott	Sacramento Kings
Texas Legends	Frisco, Texas	South	Comerica Center	4,500	2006 (Note: As the Colorado 14ers)		Max Hooper	Dallas Mavericks
Valley Suns	Tempe, Arizona	West	Mullett Arena	5,000	2024		Paul Jesperson	Phoenix Suns

=== Team ownership and NBA affiliations ===
Ownership models vary across the NBA G League. Growing willingness among NBA organizations to invest in the G League has led to two main models: direct ownership of G League teams by parent NBA clubs and single-affiliate partnerships in which the G League team remains independently owned while the affiliate NBA team runs and finances basketball operations.

The first NBA club to own a D-League team was the Los Angeles Lakers, which in 2006 bought the Los Angeles D-Fenders (renamed the South Bay Lakers in 2017 and the Coachella Valley Lakers in 2026). The San Antonio Spurs bought the Austin Toros (now the Austin Spurs) in 2007; the Oklahoma City Thunder bought the Tulsa 66ers (now the Oklahoma City Blue) in 2008. More NBA teams began to purchase existing franchises or create new teams to have their own single-affiliation teams. In 2011, the Cleveland Cavaliers purchased the New Mexico Thunderbirds and renamed them the Canton Charge, and the Golden State Warriors purchased the Dakota Wizards, with the Warriors moving the Wizards a year later to become the Santa Cruz Warriors. In 2013, the Philadelphia 76ers purchased the inactive Utah Flash and moved them to Newark, Delaware, as the Delaware 87ers; the team is now the Delaware Blue Coats, and plays in Wilmington. In 2014, the New York Knicks became the seventh team to fully own and operate their own NBA D-League affiliate in the Westchester Knicks. In 2015, the Toronto Raptors created their own expansion franchise, the Raptors 905. In 2017, the Timberwolves purchased the Iowa Energy and renamed the team the Iowa Wolves. In 2017, the Atlanta Hawks launched their team in under the Erie BayHawks name and then moved the franchise to College Park, Georgia, in 2019 as the College Park Skyhawks. In 2021, the Detroit Pistons moved the Northern Arizona Suns to Detroit and renamed the team as the Motor City Cruise. In 2019, the New Orleans Pelicans launched their G League franchise as a third incarnation of the Erie BayHawks before moving the team to Birmingham, Alabama, as the Birmingham Squadron in 2021. In April 2023, the Portland Trail Blazers announced they would launch their affiliate, the Rip City Remix, for the 2023–24 season. The Phoenix Suns launched the Valley Suns as its affiliate team for the 2024–25 season.

In 2009, the Houston Rockets and Rio Grande Valley Vipers pioneered the single-affiliate partnership, also known as the hybrid model. This led to similar deals: the New Jersey Nets and Springfield Armor, beginning in 2011–12; the New York Knicks and Erie BayHawks in June 2011 the Portland Trail Blazers and the Idaho Stampede in May 2012; the Boston Celtics and Maine Red Claws in June 2012; the Miami Heat and Sioux Falls Skyforce in June 2013; the Sacramento Kings and Reno Bighorns (now the Stockton Kings) in July 2013. The Stampede ended their affiliation with the Trail Blazers after the 2013–14 season and in June 2014 announced their affiliation with the Utah Jazz. The Armor moved to Grand Rapids, Michigan, after the 2013–14 season and affiliated with the Detroit Pistons. From 2014 to 2017, the Memphis Grizzlies had a single-affiliation with the Iowa Energy. In 2015, the last multiple-affiliate team, the Fort Wayne Mad Ants (now the Noblesville Boom), were purchased by the Indiana Pacers, making the 2015–16 season the first with all teams having single-affiliations.

In some cases, the hybrid affiliation led to the parent team buying their affiliate's franchise outright. On March 24, 2015, the Utah Jazz purchased their affiliate, the Idaho Stampede, and, after one more season in Boise, moved the team to Salt Lake City. On April 11, 2016, the Phoenix Suns purchased their affiliate, the Bakersfield Jam, and announced the immediate move of the team to Prescott Valley, Arizona, as the Northern Arizona Suns beginning with the 2016–17 season. On October 20, 2016, the Sacramento Kings bought the majority ownership of their affiliate of the previous eight seasons, the Reno Bighorns, and would eventually move the team to Stockton, California, as the Stockton Kings after the 2017–18 season. On December 14, 2016, the Magic purchased their affiliate, the Erie BayHawks, with the intention to move the team to Lakeland, Florida, in 2017. In 2017, the Miami Heat purchased the controlling interest in the Sioux Falls Skyforce after being its primary affiliate since 2013. In July 2019, the Boston Celtics acquired its affiliate, the Maine Red Claws, which became the Maine Celtics in 2021.

Since 2020, the league added two teams without affiliation, one of which is still operational. On December 12, 2019, the Mexico City Capitanes, which had been playing in the Liga Nacional de Baloncesto Profesional, was announced as joining the NBA G League as an independent team in the 2020–21 season on a five-year agreement. The COVID-19 pandemic prevented a normal 2020–21 season and delayed the Capitanes' debut to the 2021–22 season. On April 16, 2020, the NBA launched a development program for NBA prospects and a new unaffiliated team called the NBA G League Ignite, which began play in the 2020–21 season. The Ignite team folded after the 2023–24 season.

Parent club ownership:

- Austin Spurs (by the San Antonio Spurs)
- Capital City Go-Go (by the Washington Wizards)
- Cleveland Charge (by the Cleveland Cavaliers)
- Coachella Valley Lakers (by the Los Angeles Lakers)
- College Park Skyhawks (by the Atlanta Hawks)
- Delaware Blue Coats (by the Philadelphia 76ers)
- Greensboro Swarm (by the Charlotte Hornets)
- Iowa Wolves (by the Minnesota Timberwolves)
- Laketown Squadron (by the New Orleans Pelicans)
- Long Island Nets (by the Brooklyn Nets)
- Maine Celtics (by the Boston Celtics)
- Memphis Hustle (by the Memphis Grizzlies)
- Motor City Cruise (by the Detroit Pistons)
- Noblesville Boom (by the Indiana Pacers)
- Oklahoma City Blue (by the Oklahoma City Thunder)
- Osceola Magic (by the Orlando Magic)
- Raptors 905 (by the Toronto Raptors)
- Rip City Remix (by the Portland Trail Blazers)
- Salt Lake City Stars (by the Utah Jazz)
- San Diego Clippers (by the Los Angeles Clippers)
- Santa Cruz Warriors (by the Golden State Warriors)
- Sioux Falls Skyforce (with the Miami Heat)
- Stockton Kings (by the Sacramento Kings)
- Texas Legends (by the Dallas Mavericks)
- Valley Suns (by the Phoenix Suns)
- Westchester Knicks (by the New York Knicks)
- Windy City Bulls (by the Chicago Bulls)
- Wisconsin Herd (by the Milwaukee Bucks)

Single affiliation/hybrid model:

- Grand Rapids Gold (with the Denver Nuggets)
- Rio Grande Valley Vipers (with the Houston Rockets)

G League teams without an exclusive affiliate:

- Mexico City Capitanes

=== Defunct or moved teams ===
Team	City	Year(s)	Former NBA affiliates	Notes
Agua Caliente/Ontario Clippers	Ontario, California	2017–2024	Los Angeles Clippers	Became the San Diego Clippers
Albuquerque/New Mexico Thunderbirds	Albuquerque, New Mexico	2005–2011	Cleveland Cavaliers, Dallas Mavericks, Indiana Pacers, Miami Heat, New Orleans Hornets, Orlando Magic, Philadelphia 76ers, Phoenix Suns, Sacramento Kings, Seattle SuperSonics, Utah Jazz	Became the Canton Charge
Anaheim Arsenal	Anaheim, California	2006–2009	Atlanta Hawks, Los Angeles Clippers, Orlando Magic, Portland Trail Blazers	Became the Springfield Armor
Arkansas RimRockers	North Little Rock, Arkansas	2004–2007	Atlanta Hawks, Cleveland Cavaliers, Memphis Grizzlies, Miami Heat, Toronto Raptors	Folded by owners
Asheville Altitude	Asheville, North Carolina	2001–2005	None	Became the Tulsa 66ers
Bakersfield Jam	Bakersfield, California	2006–2016	Atlanta Hawks, Golden State Warriors, Los Angeles Clippers, Los Angeles Lakers, Orlando Magic, Phoenix Suns, Sacramento Kings, Toronto Raptors, Utah Jazz	Became the Northern Arizona Suns
Birmingham Squadron	Birmingham, Alabama	2021–2026	New Orleans Pelicans	Became the Laketown Squadron
Canton Charge	Canton, Ohio	2011–2021	Cleveland Cavaliers	Became the Cleveland Charge
(North) Charleston Lowgators	Charleston, South Carolina	2001–2004	None	Became the Florida Flame
Colorado 14ers	Broomfield, Colorado	2006–2009	Chicago Bulls, Denver Nuggets, New Jersey Nets, Toronto Raptors	Became the Texas Legends
Columbus Riverdragons	Columbus, Georgia	2001–2005	None	Became the Austin Toros
Dakota Wizards	Bismarck, North Dakota	2006–2012	Chicago Bulls, Golden State Warriors, Memphis Grizzlies, Washington Wizards	Became the Santa Cruz Warriors
Erie BayHawks	Erie, Pennsylvania	2008–2021	Cleveland Cavaliers, New York Knicks, Orlando Magic, Philadelphia 76ers, Toronto Raptors, Atlanta Hawks, New Orleans Pelicans	Became the Lakeland Magic, College Park Skyhawks, and Birmingham Squadron (Note: The original Erie BayHawks, at the time an affiliate of the Orlando Magic, were fully purchased and moved to Lakeland as the Lakeland Magic starting with the 2017 season. The Atlanta Hawks began operating their new development franchise in Erie in 2017, before moving it to College Park, Georgia, when their new Gateway Center Arena was completed in 2019. A third franchise began using the BayHawks' name with a new franchise owned by the New Orleans Pelicans in 2019 until their renovated arena in Birmingham was completed in 2021.)
Fayetteville Patriots	Fayetteville, North Carolina	2001–2006	Charlotte Bobcats, Detroit Pistons, New York Knicks	Folded by league
Florida Flame	Fort Myers, Florida	2004–2006	Boston Celtics, Miami Heat, Minnesota Timberwolves, Orlando Magic	Folded by owners
Fort Wayne Mad Ants	Fort Wayne, Indiana	2007–2023	Indiana Pacers, Detroit Pistons, Milwaukee Bucks, Charlotte Bobcats/Hornets, Atlanta Hawks, Brooklyn Nets, Chicago Bulls, Denver Nuggets, Los Angeles Clippers, Minnesota Timberwolves, New Orleans Pelicans, Portland Trail Blazers, Toronto Raptors, Washington Wizards	Became the Indiana Mad Ants and Noblesville Boom
Fort Worth Flyers	Fort Worth, Texas	2005–2007	Charlotte Bobcats, Dallas Mavericks, Golden State Warriors, Los Angeles Lakers, Philadelphia 76ers, Portland Trail Blazers	Folded by owners
G League Ignite	Henderson, Nevada	2020–2024	None	Folded by league
Greenville Groove	Greenville, South Carolina	2001–2003	None	Folded by league
Huntsville Flight	Huntsville, Alabama	2001–2005	None	Became the Albuquerque Thunderbirds
Idaho Stampede	Boise, Idaho	2006–2016	Denver Nuggets, Portland Trail Blazers, Seattle SuperSonics, Toronto Raptors, Utah Jazz	Became the Salt Lake City Stars
Mobile Revelers	Mobile, Alabama	2001–2003	None	Folded by league
Northern Arizona Suns	Prescott Valley, Arizona	2016–2021	Phoenix Suns	Became the Motor City Cruise
Reno Bighorns	Reno, Nevada	2008–2018	Atlanta Hawks, Golden State Warriors, Memphis Grizzlies, New York Knicks, Orlando Magic, Sacramento Kings, Utah Jazz	Became the Stockton Kings
Roanoke Dazzle	Roanoke, Virginia	2001–2006	New Jersey Nets, Philadelphia 76ers, Washington Wizards	Folded by league
Springfield Armor	Springfield, Massachusetts	2009–2014	New Jersey/Brooklyn Nets, New York Knicks, Philadelphia 76ers	Became the Grand Rapids Drive
Tulsa 66ers	Tulsa, Oklahoma	2005–2014	Chicago Bulls, Dallas Mavericks, Indiana Pacers, Milwaukee Bucks, New Orleans Hornets, New York Knicks, Oklahoma City Thunder, Seattle SuperSonics	Became the Oklahoma City Blue
Utah Flash	Orem, Utah	2007–2011	Atlanta Hawks, Boston Celtics, Utah Jazz	Became the Delaware 87ers

=== Team timeline ===
Current member Former member or former names Future member Opted out of season Other league

== Champions ==
=== League champions ===
Year	Champion	NBA affiliate(s)
2002	Greenville Groove	None
2003	Mobile Revelers	None
2004	Asheville Altitude	None
2005	Asheville Altitude	None
2006	Albuquerque Thunderbirds	Phoenix Suns, Sacramento Kings, Seattle SuperSonics and Utah Jazz
2007	Dakota Wizards	Chicago Bulls and Washington Wizards
2008	Idaho Stampede	Portland Trail Blazers and Seattle SuperSonics
2009	Colorado 14ers	Denver Nuggets and New Jersey Nets
2010	Rio Grande Valley Vipers	Houston Rockets
2011	Iowa Energy	Chicago Bulls, New Orleans Hornets and Phoenix Suns
2012	Austin Toros	San Antonio Spurs
2013	Rio Grande Valley Vipers	Houston Rockets
2014	Fort Wayne Mad Ants	Charlotte Bobcats, Detroit Pistons, Indiana Pacers and Milwaukee Bucks
2015	Santa Cruz Warriors	Golden State Warriors
2016	Sioux Falls Skyforce	Miami Heat
2017	Raptors 905	Toronto Raptors
2018	Austin Spurs	San Antonio Spurs
2019	Rio Grande Valley Vipers	Houston Rockets
2020	Season canceled due to COVID-19 pandemic	
2021	Lakeland Magic	Orlando Magic
2022	Rio Grande Valley Vipers	Houston Rockets
2023	Delaware Blue Coats	Philadelphia 76ers
2024	Oklahoma City Blue	Oklahoma City Thunder
2025	Stockton Kings	Sacramento Kings
2026	Greensboro Swarm	Charlotte Hornets

=== Winter Showcase Cup tournament champions ===
Year	Champion	Result	Runner-up	Location
2019	Salt Lake City Stars (UTA)	91–88	Grand Rapids Drive (DET)	Las Vegas, NV
2020	No Winter Showcase due to COVID-19 pandemic			
2021	Delaware Blue Coats (PHI)	104–96	Oklahoma City Blue (OKC)	Las Vegas, NV
2022	Ontario Clippers (LAC)	99–97	Windy City Bulls (CHI)	Las Vegas, NV
2023	Westchester Knicks (NYK)	107–99	Indiana Mad Ants (IND)	Orlando, FL
2024	Westchester Knicks (NYK)	125–119	Sioux Falls Skyforce (MIA)	Orlando, FL
2025	Salt Lake City Stars (UTA)	137–112	Raptors 905 (TOR)	Orlando, FL

== Player allocations ==
NBA G League players generally do not sign contracts with the individual teams, but with the league itself. G League team rosters consist of a total of 13 active players, 10 (or fewer) being G League players and two (or more) NBA players. The rosters are made up in a number of ways: the previous year's players, players taken in the G League draft, allocation players (meaning players who are assigned to a team with which they have a local connection, such as a University of Texas player being assigned to the Austin Spurs) and NBA team assignments. Each team also has local tryouts, and one player from the tryouts is assigned to the team.

The minimum age to play in the G League is 18, unlike the NBA which requires players to be 19 years old and one year out of high school in order to sign an NBA contract or be eligible for the draft. The base annual salary is US$35,000 plus housing and insurance benefits. Players who are called up for NBA get bonuses totalling up to US$50,000.

=== Draft ===
The NBA G League draft occurs each season and is the major source from which teams build their rosters. Team rosters are made up of returning players (players who were on the team during the previous season), players waived by an NBA team who are designated as an 'affiliate player' to their respective G League affiliate, allocated players (players who have local significance), and drafted players. The eight round draft utilizes a serpentine format, meaning the order alternates in each round; Team A who selected first in Round 1 will select last in Round 2, while Team B who selected last in Round 1 will get the first pick in Round 2. Round 3 was added in 2014.

The league holds an annual Player Invitational, where prospects hope to earn eligibility for the upcoming draft.

=== Draft rights player rule ===
Since 2014–15, an NBA team that declines to sign an NBA draft pick can have them sign directly with their G League affiliate. Previously, an unsigned NBA pick could not be protected by the organization's G League affiliate, and the player might have ended up on the G League team of another organization.

=== Affiliate players ===
Players waived by an NBA team during training camp and up until the start of the regular season can be designated as "affiliate players" and allocated to the NBA team's G League affiliate. Each team is allowed four affiliate players. These are players that an NBA team is interested in developing in their own system. The affiliate players, however, still remain as free agents that any NBA team can sign.

=== Assignment ===
==== Standard assignment ====
Each NBA team can assign two first-year or second-year players who are under a standard NBA contract to its affiliated G League team. If more than two NBA players are assigned to a team, the team must reduce the number of G League players to keep the total roster size to 12. An NBA player will continue to be paid his NBA salary and will continue to be included on his NBA team's roster on the inactive list while playing in the G League.

NBA teams can call up players as many times as they choose, and there is no limit to the number of times an NBA player with three years or less experience can be assigned to the G League. Starting in 2011–12, veteran NBA players could be assigned with their consent. The first example of such was with Yi Jianlian, who the Dallas Mavericks assigned to the Texas Legends for two games.

==== Two-way contract ====
The 2017 collective bargaining agreement for the NBA, which took effect with the 2017–18 season, included changes allowing each NBA team to sign two players on two-way contracts. Those players spend most of their time on the team's G League roster, but can freely move to their respective NBA team for up to 45 days in the regular season, as well as be a part of the team's roster before the start of the season (including NBA training camps) and after the conclusion of the G League's regular season (though they are not allowed to be on a team's playoff roster or play in a playoff game). Only players with four or fewer years of NBA experience are eligible for two-way contracts. The league's newest CBA, which took effect with the 2023–24 season, increases the per-team limit on two-way contracts to three.

Unlike other G League players, who can be called up by any NBA team, two-way players can only be called up by their contracted NBA team. Players under two-way contracts are not counted against the NBA team's regular roster limit, and can be assigned to a G League affiliate for development while also getting a larger salary whenever they are called up to the parent team. For teams that do not have a one-to-one affiliation with a G League team, a process similar to the "flexible assignment" rule is being used to determine the placement for their own two-way contracts in the G League until every team has their proper affiliation underway.

In addition, salaries for two-way players are much higher than those for regular G League players. As of the 2017–18 season, G League players who are not on two-way contracts earn either $19,500 or $26,000 during the league's season. By contrast, two-way players' salaries while in the G League, which are pro-rated according to the number of days the player is with his G League team, are based on an annual salary between $50,000 and $75,000, and while these players are with their NBA team, they will earn a pro-rated portion of the NBA minimum rookie salary (which was $815,615 in the 2017–18 season).

Due to the COVID-19 pandemic, two-way players in 2020–21 were initially allowed to play up to 50 games in the NBA. Late in the season, restrictions were further lifted, allowing them to play more than 50 games as well as being eligible for the NBA playoffs.

=== Successful NBA call-ups ===
Many former NBA draftees, waived players, and undrafted players have played in the NBA G League. Aaron Brooks, Rudy Gobert, Bobby Simmons, and Pascal Siakam are the only former G-League players to win an NBA end-of-season award; several won the Most Improved Player Award, with Simmons getting it with the Los Angeles Clippers in 2004–05, Brooks earning it with the Houston Rockets in 2009–10 and Siakam receiving it with the Toronto Raptors in the 2018-19 NBA season. Khris Middleton became the first former D-League player to be named an NBA All-Star when he was selected to participate in the 2019 All-Star Game.

In the 2008 NBA draft, the Idaho Stampede's Mike Taylor was drafted 55th by the Portland Trail Blazers. He became the first player from the NBA D-League to be drafted by an NBA team. He was subsequently traded and signed a rookie contract with the Los Angeles Clippers. In the 2014 draft, two D-League players were selected for the first time: P. J. Hairston was drafted 26th (which was also the first time a D-League player was drafted in the first round in the NBA), and Thanasis Antetokounmpo was the 51st pick.

G-League call-ups that became NBA All-Stars: Rudy Gobert; (2020, 2021, 2022), Khris Middleton; (2019, 2020, 2022) Pascal Siakam; (2020, 2023, 2025) and Fred VanVleet; (2022) All-Star

Other noteworthy G-League call-ups include: Hassan Whiteside; (2011), Shaun Livingston and Matt Barnes; (2017) NBA champions, Chris Boucher (2018, 2019), Jeremy Lin (2019) NBA champion, J. J. Barea; (2014, 2019, 2020), Danny Green; (2015, 2017, 2018), Quinn Cook; (2018, 2020) Gary Payton II; (2022) NBA Champion.

== Annual events ==
=== All-Star Game ===
The league held its first All-Star game February 17, 2007, at the Mandalay Bay Resort and Casino in Las Vegas, Nevada. It was part of the NBA All-Star Weekend in Las Vegas. As with the NBA's showcase game, a fan vote determined the starting lineup for each team. The East won, 114 to 100, with Pops Mensah-Bonsu named the game's MVP.

The second annual All-Star game was held on February 16, 2008, at the Ernest N. Morial Convention Center in New Orleans. The Blue team beat the Red team, 117–99, and Jeremy Richardson was named the MVP. In addition to the NBA D-League All-Star Game, the league debuted its first Dream Factory Friday Night events, which modeled after the NBA All-Star Saturday Night events. The events consists of Three-Point Shootout (won by Adam Harrington), Slam Dunk Contest (won by Brent Petway), and game of H-O-R-S-E (won by Lance Allred).

The 2009 D-League All-Star game was held on February 14, 2009, at the Phoenix Convention Center in Phoenix, Arizona. The Red Team defeated the Blue Team, 113–103, and Blake Ahearn and Courtney Sims were named co-MVPs. Along with the All-Star game, the NBA D-League ran their second annual Dream Factory Friday Night events. H-O-R-S-E was won by Will Conroy of the Albuquerque Thunderbirds. The Three-Point Shootout was won by Blake Ahearn of the Dakota Wizards, and the Slam Dunk Contest was won by James White of the Bakersfield Jam.

The 2010 D-League All-Star game was held on February 13, 2010, at the Dallas Convention Center in Dallas. The Western Conference team defeated the Eastern Conference Team, 98–81. Bakersfield Jam center Brian Butch, who scored 18 points and grabbed 13 rebounds, was named as the MVP of the game. The NBA D-League also ran their third annual Dream Factory Friday Night events. The inaugural Shooting Stars Competition was won by a team of Pat Carroll, Trey Gilder and Carlos Powell. The Three-Point Shootout was won by Andre Ingram of the Utah Flash, and the Slam Dunk Contest was won by Dar Tucker of the Los Angeles D-Fenders.

The game continued until 2017, with games continuing to be held during NBA All-Star Weekend at the same site. In 2018, it was replaced by a game between G League all-stars and the Mexico national team held in Los Angeles. After that event, this contest did not return in any form. Since 2022, select G League players participate in the Rising Stars Challenge alongside NBA rookie and sophomore players.

=== NBA G League Showcase ===
The league stages an annual NBA G League Showcase in which all of the league's teams play each other in a "carnival" format. The showcase was first played in 2005 was originally intended solely as a scouting event for NBA general managers and scouts, but evolved into a four-day event with each team playing two games apiece. Since its inception, more than 100 players combined have been called-up or recalled during or immediately following the Showcase.

As of 2019, the event's location was the Mandalay Bay Resort and Casino on the Las Vegas Strip. Because of limited space at the conference center site, all games are played without spectators, although TV and Internet coverage is available for all games. The 2019 showcase was a series of mini-tournaments in which the winning team shared a $100,000 grand prize.

Before Las Vegas, host cities were Columbus, Georgia (2005); Fayetteville, North Carolina (2006); Sioux Falls, South Dakota (2007); Boise, Idaho (2008); Orem, Utah (2009); Boise, Idaho (2010); South Padre Island, Texas (2011); Reno, Nevada in 2012 and 2013; Santa Cruz, California in 2015; and Mississauga, Ontario in 2017 and 2018. It was not held in 2016.

== Notable alumni ==
=== International players ===
- Mikki Moore, USA National team (1999) - 5 appearances
- Terry Dehere, USA National team (1991) - 7 appearances
- Rusty LaRue, USA National team (1997) - 9 appearances
- Marcus Banks, USA National team (2001)
- Kendall Dartez, USA National team (2001)
- Jimmy King, USA National team (1998) - 9 appearances
- Marque Perry, USA National team (2005) - 8 appearances
- Lynn Greer, USA National team (2001-05)
- Ron Slay, USA National team (2005) - 10 appearances
- Alex Scales, USA National team (2005) - 9 appearances
- Tang Hamilton, USA National team (2005) - 10 appearances
- Noel Felix, USA National team (2005) - 6 appearances and Belize National team (2009)
- Jerome Beasley, USA National team (2005) - 10 appearances
- Kris Lang, USA National team (2005) - 9 appearances
- Thanasis Antetokounmpo, Greece National team (2016) - 5 appearances

== See also ==
- List of NBA G League champions
- List of NBA G League awards
- List of NBA G League yearly standings
- List of developmental and minor sports leagues
- NBA G League International Challenge
