= 2010–11 NBA Development League season =

- League: NBA Development League
- Sport: Basketball
- Duration: November 18, 2010 – April 29, 2011
- Total attendance: 1,125,583
- TV partner(s): Versus, NBA TV

Draft
- Top draft pick: Nick Fazekas
- Picked by: Reno Bighorns

Regular season
- Top seed: Iowa Energy
- Season MVP: Curtis Stinson (Iowa Energy)
- Top scorer: Trey Johnson (Bakersfield Jam)

Playoffs

Finals
- Champions: Iowa Energy
- Runners-up: Rio Grande Valley Vipers

NBA Development League seasons
- ← 2009–10 2011–12 →

The 2010–11 NBA Development League season was the tenth season of the NBA Development League (NBA D-League). The NBA D-League is the official minor league basketball organization owned and run by the National Basketball Association (NBA). The league was formed in 2001 as the National Basketball Development League (NBDL). The league adopted the "NBA D-League" name in 2005 to reflect its close affiliation with the NBA (a name it retained until 2017, when it was renamed the NBA G League). One expansion franchise, the Texas Legends, joined the 15 returning teams from the previous season.

The season started with the 2010 NBA Development League Draft, which was held on November 1, 2010. Former NBA second-round draft pick Nick Fazekas was selected first overall by the Reno Bighorns. The regular season began on November 18, 2010, and ended on April 4, 2011. The Iowa Energy had the best regular season record with 37 wins and 13 losses. They also won the Eastern Conference, while the Reno Bighorns won the Western Conference with the second-best regular season record with 34 wins and 16 losses. The regular season set a new record on total attendance of 1,125,583, a 7.9% increase from the previous season.

The playoffs started on April 6, 2011. The first seed, the Iowa Energy, defeated the Utah Flash and the Tulsa 66ers in the first and second round consecutively. The defending champion Rio Grande Valley Vipers, who was seeded third, defeated the Bakersfield Jam and the Reno Bighorns in the first and second round respectively. The Energy and the Vipers face each other in the 2011 NBA D-League Finals that was started on April 24, 2011. The Energy won the first game 123–106, while the Vipers won the second game 141–122 to even the series. On April 29, 2011, the Energy won the decisive Game Three to win their first ever championship.

== Teams and coaches ==
Team	City	Arena	Head coach	NBA affiliate(s)
Eastern Conference
Dakota Wizards	Bismarck, North Dakota	Bismarck Civic Center	Rory White	Memphis Grizzlies, Washington Wizards
Erie BayHawks	Erie, Pennsylvania	Tullio Arena	Jay Larranaga	Cleveland Cavaliers, Toronto Raptors
Fort Wayne Mad Ants	Fort Wayne, Indiana	Allen County War Memorial Coliseum	Joey Meyer	Detroit Pistons, Indiana Pacers, Milwaukee Bucks
Iowa Energy	Des Moines, Iowa	Wells Fargo Arena	Nick Nurse	Chicago Bulls, Phoenix Suns
Maine Red Claws	Portland, Maine	Portland Expo Building	Austin Ainge	Boston Celtics, Charlotte Bobcats
Sioux Falls Skyforce	Sioux Falls, South Dakota	Sioux Falls Arena	Tony Fritz (until January 14, 2011); Morris McHone (from January 20, 2011)^{[a]}	Miami Heat, Minnesota Timberwolves
Springfield Armor	Springfield, Massachusetts	MassMutual Center	Dee Brown	New Jersey Nets, New York Knicks, Philadelphia 76ers
Western Conference
Austin Toros	Cedar Park, Texas	Cedar Park Center	Brad Jones	San Antonio Spurs
Bakersfield Jam	Bakersfield, California	Jam Events Center	Will Voigt	Los Angeles Clippers, Los Angeles Lakers
Idaho Stampede	Boise, Idaho	Qwest Arena	Randy Livingston	Denver Nuggets, Portland Trail Blazers
New Mexico Thunderbirds	Rio Rancho, New Mexico	Santa Ana Star Center	Darvin Ham	New Orleans Hornets, Orlando Magic
Reno Bighorns	Reno, Nevada	Reno Events Center	Eric Musselman	Golden State Warriors, Sacramento Kings
Rio Grande Valley Vipers	Hidalgo, Texas	State Farm Arena	Chris Finch	Houston Rockets
Texas Legends	Frisco, Texas	Dr Pepper Arena	Nancy Lieberman	Dallas Mavericks
Tulsa 66ers	Tulsa, Oklahoma	Tulsa Convention Center	Nate Tibbetts	Oklahoma City Thunder
Utah Flash	Orem, Utah	McKay Events Center	Kevin Young	Atlanta Hawks, Utah Jazz

=== Team changes ===
- The Texas Legends entered the D-League as an expansion franchise. The Legends was formed when an ownership group led by Donnie Nelson, the President of Basketball Operations and General Manager of the Dallas Mavericks, purchased the Colorado 14ers on June 18, 2009. The franchise relocated to Frisco, Texas and was renamed the Texas Legends.
- On March 1, 2010, the Albuquerque Thundebirds announced that they would move from the Tingley Coliseum in Albuquerque, New Mexico to the Santa Ana Star Center in Rio Rancho, New Mexico. The team was also renamed the New Mexico Thunderbirds to reflect their new location and their statewide representation.
- On May 21, 2010, the Los Angeles D-Fenders announced that they would not play in the 2010–11 season. The franchise, which is owned by the Los Angeles Lakers, relocated to El Segundo, California and will return to play in the 2011–12 season.

==== Affiliation changes ====
On July 6, 2010, the league announced the affiliation system for the season. The Austin Toros and the Tulsa 66ers, which is owned by the San Antonio Spurs and the Oklahoma City Thunder respectively, continued their single-affiliation partnerships with their parent teams. The Houston Rockets also continued their single-affiliation partnership with the Rio Grande Valley Vipers. The Texas Legends, who is owned by Dallas Mavericks' General Manager Donnie Nelson, also began a single-affiliation partnership with the Mavericks. The other 12 teams were affiliated with at least two NBA teams each. Due to several team changes above and other circumstances, some affiliation changes occurred.

- The Dallas Mavericks, who was affiliated with the Albuquerque Thunderbirds for the last two seasons, began a single-affiliation partnership with the Texas Legends.
- The Orlando Magic, who was affiliated with the Reno Bighorns in the 2009–10 season, were announced as the new affiliate of the New Mexico Thunderbirds.
- The Golden State Warriors, who was affiliated with the Bakersfield Jam for the last four seasons, were announced as the new affiliate of the Reno Bighorns.
- The Los Angeles Lakers, who owned and was affiliated with the Los Angeles D-Fenders for the last four seasons, were announced as the new affiliate of the Bakersfield Jam.

=== Coaching changes ===
==== Offseason ====
- On November 5, 2009, the Frisco D-League Team, who later became the Texas Legends, hired Basketball Hall of Famer Nancy Lieberman as the franchise's first head coach. She became the first female to coach a men's professional basketball team.
- On June 2, 2010, the Idaho Stampede hired 2007 D-League Most Valuable Player and former Stampede player Randy Livingston as the team's head coach, replacing Bob MacKinnon Jr. who resigned on May 6, 2010.
- On July 27, 2010, the New Mexico Thunderbirds promoted assistant coach and former Thunderbirds player Darvin Ham as the team's head coach, replacing John Coffino who resigned in April 2010.
- On August 12, 2010, the Reno Bighorns hired former NBA head coach Eric Musselman as the team's head coach, replacing Jay Humphries who left the team after the 2009–10 season.
- On September 7, 2010, the Utah Flash promoted assistant coach Kevin Young as the team's head coach, replacing Brad Jones who was later hired as the head coach for the Austin Toros on September 28, 2010.
- On September 21, 2010, the Erie BayHawks hired former Irish national team head coach Jay Larranaga as the team's head coach, replacing John Treloar who was hired as the Director of Player Personnel for the Phoenix Suns on September 21, 2010.
- On September 28, 2010, the Austin Toros hired former Utah Flash head coach Brad Jones as the team's head coach, replacing Quin Snyder who was hired as the assistant coach for the Philadelphia 76ers on July 1, 2010.

==== In-season ====
- ^{a} On January 14, 2011, the Sioux Falls Skyforce fired head coach Tony Fritz. Assistant coach Duane Ticknor took over as the interim head coach for two games until former Skyforce head coach Morris McHone was hired on January 20, 2011.

== Players ==
An NBA D-League team roster consists of draftees, returning, allocation and tryout players. In addition, NBA teams can assign players who are on their first or second NBA season to their D-League affiliates. The roster must consist of 10 D-League players, but the maximum roster size is 12 players, including NBA assignees. If a team had more than two NBA assignees, the team must reduce its roster to avoid having more than 12 players. In the D-League, all players sign a one-year NBA D-League Standard Player Contract with the league, not with the specific D-League teams.

Returning players are players who played in the league during the previous season and are retained by their respective teams. The D-League teams are allowed to invite a limited number of returning players. Players who signed a D-League contract but are not retained by their previous teams are placed on the draft pool, along with new players who also sign with the league. Tryout players are the players who are invited to join the D-League team from the open tryouts which are held by each teams in October, before the season began.

Beginning this season, the league implements a new allocation players rule. In the past, the teams are awarded allocation players, who are usually players with significant local or player appeal to that market. The allocation rule was replaced to accommodate the new allocation rule which involves the NBA affiliates of the D-League teams. In the new rule, up to three players cut last from the NBA teams roster prior to the draft, will be allocated to their D-League affiliates, if they sign the standard D-League contract. The new rule increased the bond between the NBA teams and their D-League affiliates, while sacrificing the marketing effect from local allocation players.

=== Returning, allocation and tryout players ===
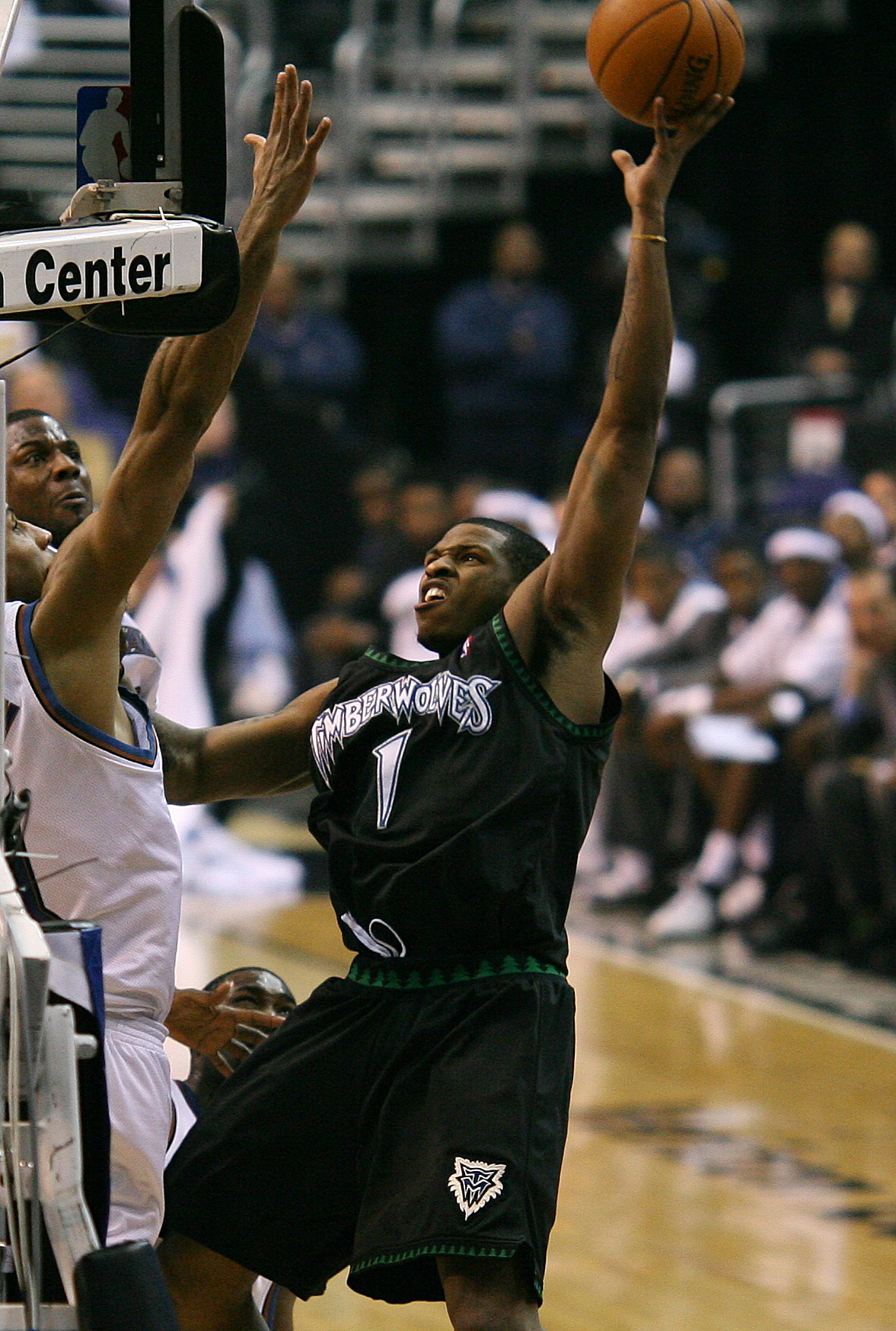
Former Minnesota Timberwolves and Sacramento Kings player Rashad McCants was allocated to the Texas Legends.

On October 30, 2011, the league announces the returning, allocation and tryout players for the 16 teams. Several players with NBA experience who returned to their previous teams are JamesOn Curry, Reece Gaines, Orien Greene, Steven Hill, Chris Hunter, Cedric Jackson, Othyus Jeffers, Dontell Jefferson, Trey Johnson, Renaldo Major, Chris McCray, Courtney Sims and Mario West. D-League All-Stars Walker Russell Jr., Mustafa Shakur and Curtis Stinson were also named on the returning players list. The expansion franchise Texas Legends earlier participated in an expansion draft to acquire the rights to returning players of the Los Angeles D-Fenders, who would not take part in the 2010–11 season. The Legends selected 10 out of the 14 available players and two of them were later named in the returning players list for the Legends.

The list of allocation players from the NBA teams includes several notable players such as former NBA players Thomas Gardner, Stéphane Lasme, Rashad McCants, Sean Williams and Kyle Weaver. McCants and Williams, who were NBA first-round draft picks, were intentionally signed by the Dallas Mavericks towards the end of the training camp period and were waived on the day after, solely for the purpose of allocating them to the Texas Legends. Similar situation occurred with NBA second-round draft pick Tiny Gallon, who was waived by the Boston Celtics only two days after he was signed. Gallon was then allocated to the Maine Red Claws. The returning and allocation players were joined by the tryout players and the draftees for the training camp, where the players would compete for a place on the teams' 12-man roster.

=== Draft ===
The tenth annual NBA Development League Draft was held on November 1, 2010. In this draft, all 16 teams took turns selecting eligible players for their roster. Former NBA second-round draft pick, Nick Fazekas, was selected first overall by the Reno Bighorns. Former Charlotte Bobcats player, Alan Anderson was selected second by the New Mexico Thunderbirds. Magnum Rolle, the 51st pick in the 2010 NBA draft was selected third by the Maine Red Claws. Other notable first-round picks are former NBA second-round draft picks Robert Vaden, Cheikh Samb and Salim Stoudamire. In the second round, two former NBA draft picks, Walter Sharpe and Antonio Daniels, were selected. Daniels, who has played 12 seasons in the NBA since he was drafted fourth in the 1997 NBA draft, was selected by the Texas Legends with the 29th pick. A total of 128 players were selected in the eight-round draft.

=== Assignments ===
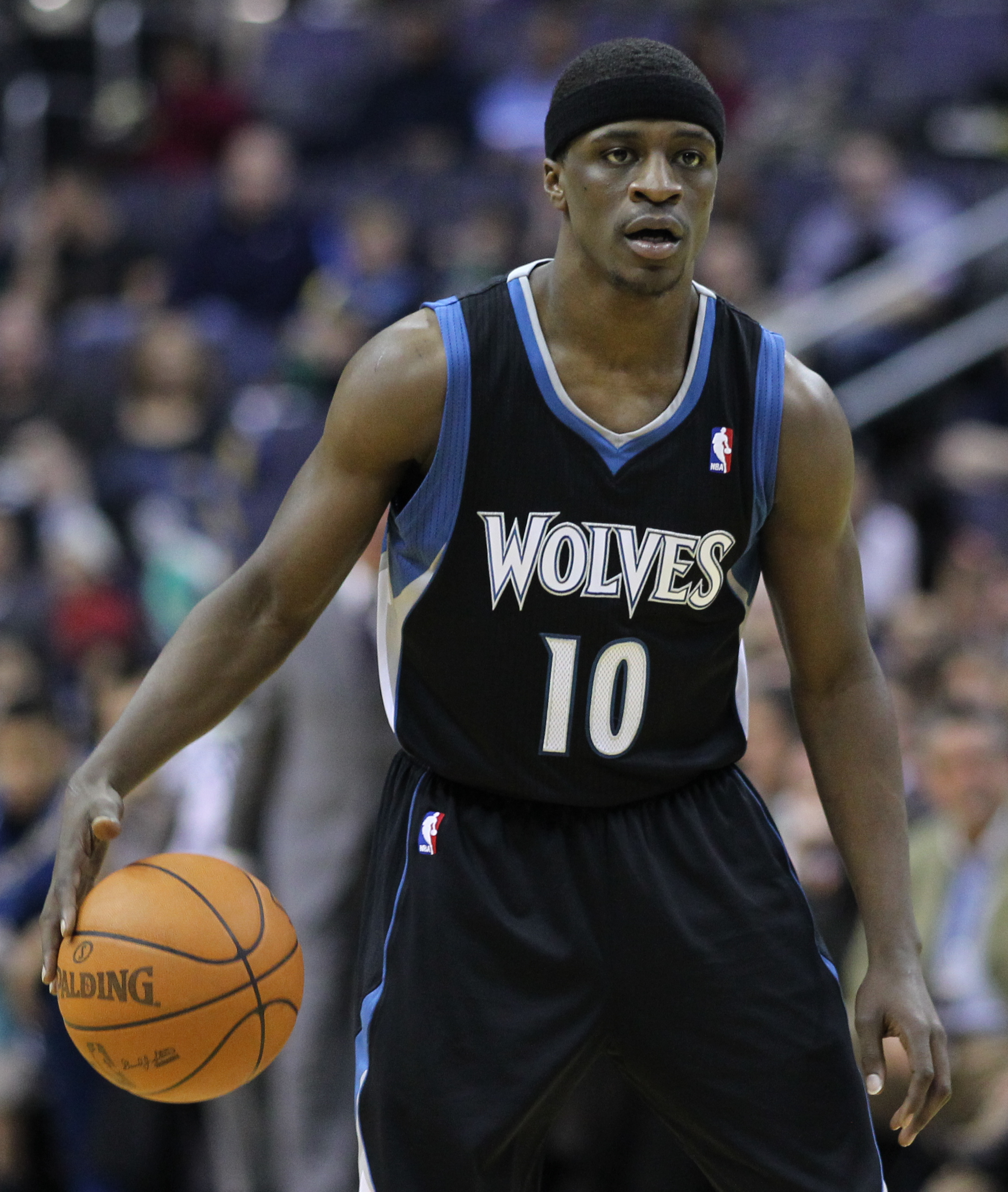
Jonny Flynn was assigned to the Sioux Falls Skyforce to continue his rehab from hip injury.

During the 2010–11 season, an all-time high 39 NBA players were assigned to the D-League. Out of the 39 players assigned, 18 are NBA first-round draft picks, 14 are NBA second-round draft picks, and 7 are undrafted players. Hasheem Thabeet, the second overall pick in 2009, was assigned to the Rio Grande Valley Vipers for seven games in March and April. He is the highest drafted NBA player to ever play in the D-League. The sixth pick in the 2009 NBA Draft, Jonny Flynn, was assigned twice and played two games with the Sioux Falls Skyforce. He was assigned to the D-League for the purpose of rehabbing from a hip injury which required a surgery during the off-season. Four other former lottery picks, Terrence Williams, Cole Aldrich, Ed Davis and Patrick Patterson, were also assigned to the D-League. Aldrich, Davis and Patterson are among the ten first-round draft picks from the 2010 NBA draft who were assigned this season. Out of the 27 players selected in the 2010 NBA Draft who played in the D-League this season, 22 of them were NBA assignees.

2009 NBA first-round picks, Rodrigue Beaubois and Terrence Williams, both earned the distinction of being assigned to the D-League for unusual reasons. On November 30, 2010, Beaubois was assigned by the Dallas Mavericks to the Texas Legends even though he was still inactive due to an injury suffered in the off-season and was not expected to return until January. He was recalled in January without playing any game for the Legends as he was still injured during his whole stint with the Legends. At the time of his assignment, the Legends had seven former NBA first-round draft picks on their roster. Mavericks owner Mark Cuban stated that Beaubois was assigned for "marketing support" as the Legends is owned by Donnie Nelson who is also the Mavericks' general manager. On the other hand, Williams was assigned to the Springfield Armor after he was suspended by the New Jersey Nets due to repeated violations of the team's policy. Even though the Nets insists that the assignment is not a demotion, the move initiated an argument that Williams was punished by being demoted to the D-League. He was recalled after playing three games with the Armor, where he averaged a triple-double.

=== Call-ups ===
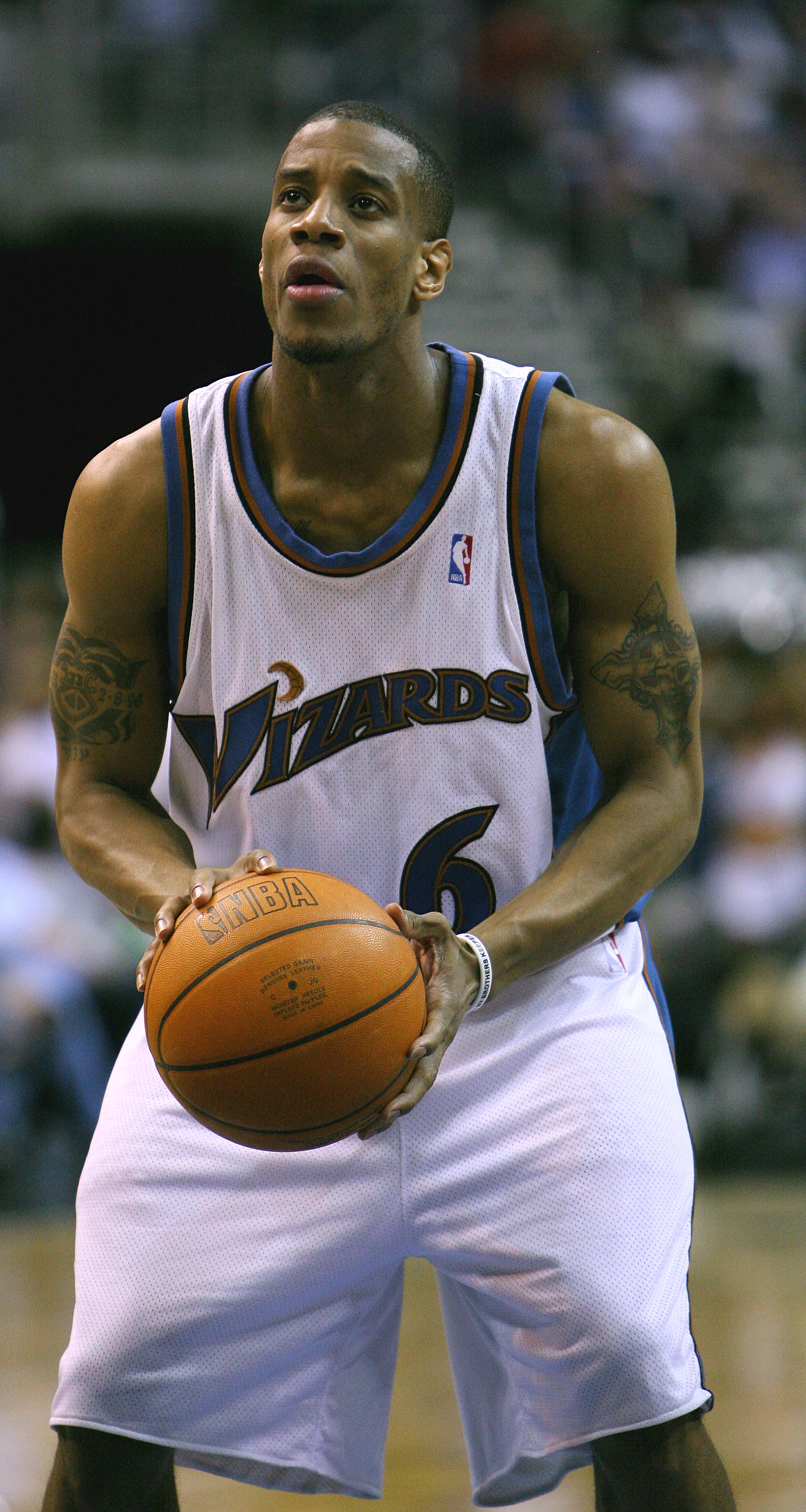
NBA veteran Antonio Daniels played for the Texas Legends before he was called up to the Philadelphia 76ers.

A call-up occurs when a player is signed by an NBA team. An NBA team is allowed to sign any D-League player as long as they are eligible to play in the NBA under the current Collective Bargaining Agreement (CBA). However, an NBA team could not call-up a player whose draft rights are still held by other NBA teams. This rule applies for three Tulsa 66ers players, Ryan Reid, Robert Vaden and Latavious Williams, whose draft rights are still held by the Oklahoma City Thunder, the NBA affiliate of the 66ers. A D-League player is usually signed to a 10-day contracts, a short-term contract which lasted ten days and are available to be used starting January 5. A player can only sign two 10-day contracts with the same team in one season. If the team want to retain the player after the second 10-day contract expired, the team has to sign the player for the remainder of the season.

During the season, there were 27 call-ups involving 20 different players. Seven players earned multiple call-ups to more than one NBA team before they finally earned contracts for the remainder of the season. Only three players failed to earn contracts for the remainder of the season. The Rio Grande Valley Vipers and the Tulsa 66ers each had three players called-up. The San Antonio Spurs called-up the most player with four, but only two of them earned contracts for the remainder of the season. The Washington Wizards called-up three players and each of them earned a contract for the remainder of the season.

Out of the 20 players assigned, 10 of them have played in the NBA before they were called-up. NBA veteran Antonio Daniels, who returned to professional basketball after one-year absence, played for the Texas Legends until he was called up to the Philadelphia 76ers in April. Jeff Adrien, who began the season with the Golden State Warriors before he was waived in December, was called up by the Warriors in February. Steve Novak and Mario West, who have played four and three seasons in the NBA respectively, also received call-ups and were signed for the remainder of the season. Other players with NBA experience who were called-up are Othyus Jeffers, Trey Johnson, Danny Green, Orien Greene, Garrett Temple and Kyle Weaver. Six players, Marcus Cousin, Zabian Dowdell, Patrick Ewing Jr., Chris Johnson, Larry Owens and Mustafa Shakur, made their first NBA appearance during the call-ups.

Player	Team	NBA team	Date(s) called-up and contract(s) signed
Zabian Dowdell	Tulsa 66ers	Phoenix Suns	January 9: Signed a 10-day contract January 27: Signed a second 10-day contract February 7: Signed for the remainder of the season
Larry Owens	Tulsa 66ers	San Antonio Spurs	January 16: Signed a 10-day contract January 26: Signed a second 10-day contract
Mustafa Shakur	Rio Grande Valley Vipers	Washington Wizards	January 22: Signed a 10-day contract February 12: Signed a second 10-day contract February 28: Signed for the remainder of the season
Chris Johnson	Dakota Wizards	Portland Trail Blazers	January 24: Signed a 10-day contract
Garrett Temple	Erie BayHawks	Milwaukee Bucks	January 25: Signed a 10-day contract February 5: Signed a second 10-day contract
Trey Johnson	Bakersfield Jam	Toronto Raptors	January 26: Signed a 10-day contract February 7: Signed a second 10-day contract
Orien Greene	Utah Flash	New Jersey Nets	February 1: Signed a 10-day contract
Steve Novak	Reno Bighorns	San Antonio Spurs	February 8: Signed a 10-day contract February 22: Signed a second 10-day contract March 4: Signed for the remainder of the season
Chris Johnson (2)	Dakota Wizards	Boston Celtics	February 24: Signed a 10-day contract
Jeff Adrien	Rio Grande Valley Vipers	Golden State Warriors	February 25: Signed for the remainder of the season
Othyus Jeffers	Iowa Energy	San Antonio Spurs	March 4: Signed a 10-day contract
Garrett Temple (2)	Erie BayHawks	Charlotte Bobcats	March 7: Signed a 10-day contract March 17: Signed a second 10-day contract March 28: Signed for the remainder of the season
Marcus Cousin	Austin Toros	Utah Jazz	March 9: Signed a 10-day contract
Jerel McNeal	Rio Grande Valley Vipers	New Orleans Hornets	March 9: Signed a 10-day contract
Chris Johnson (3)	Dakota Wizards	Portland Trail Blazers	March 14: Signed for the remainder of the season
Danny Green	Reno Bighorns	San Antonio Spurs	March 16: Signed for the remainder of the season
Othyus Jeffers (2)	Iowa Energy	Washington Wizards	March 17: Signed a 10-day contract March 27: Signed a second 10-day contract April 6: Signed for the remainder of the season
Patrick Ewing Jr.	Sioux Falls Skyforce	New Orleans Hornets	March 26: Signed a 10-day contract April 5: Signed for the remainder of the season
Kyle Weaver	Austin Toros	Utah Jazz	March 30: Signed a 10-day contract
Mario West	Maine Red Claws	New Jersey Nets	March 31: Signed a 10-day contract April 10: Signed for the remainder of the season
Antonio Daniels	Texas Legends	Philadelphia 76ers	April 5: Signed for the remainder of the season
Larry Owens (2)	Tulsa 66ers	Washington Wizards	April 6: Signed for the remainder of the season
Robert Vaden	Tulsa 66ers	Oklahoma City Thunder*	April 9: Signed for the remainder of the season
Marcus Cousin (2)	Austin Toros	Houston Rockets	April 11: Signed for the remainder of the season
Magnum Rolle	Maine Red Claws	Atlanta Hawks	April 11: Signed for the remainder of the season
Marqus Blakely	Iowa Energy	Houston Rockets	April 13: Signed for the remainder of the season
Trey Johnson (2)	Bakersfield Jam	Los Angeles Lakers*	April 13: Signed for the remainder of the season

Note

- Number in parentheses indicates the number of call-ups a player has received during the season.
- Asterisk (*) indicates team affiliation

== Regular season ==
=== Showcase ===
The seventh annual NBA D-League Showcase was held at the South Padre Island Convention Centre in South Padre Island, Texas from January 10 until January 13, 2011. The event featured every D-League teams who played two games each over a four-day schedule. The games were attended by the professional scouts from all NBA teams. The event was designed to allow the NBA teams to evaluate the D-League's prospects for future call-ups. After the Showcase, four D-League players, Jeff Adrien, Joe Alexander, Othyus Jeffers and Marcus Landry, along with one NBA player assigned to the D-League, Jeremy Lin, were named to the All-NBA D-League Showcase First Team by a panel of D-League head coaches, NBA scouts and media.

In addition to the 16 games, the league also hosted the inaugural NBA D-League Showcase Three-Point Contest and NBA D-League Showcase Slam Dunk Contest. The Three-Point Contest was won by Texas Legends guard Booker Woodfox, while the Slam Dunk Contest was won by Springfield Armor guard L. D. Williams.

=== Standings ===
==== Eastern Conference ====
Team	W	L	PCT	GB	Home	Road
x-Iowa Energy (1)	37	13	.740	–	21–4	16–9
x-Erie BayHawks (5)	32	18	.640	5	18–7	14–11
Fort Wayne Mad Ants	24	26	.480	13	16–9	8–17
Dakota Wizards	19	31	.380	18	11–14	8–17
Maine Red Claws	18	32	.360	19	14–11	4–21
Springfield Armor	13	37	.260	24	7–18	6–19
Sioux Falls Skyforce	10	40	.200	27	6–19	4–21

==== Western Conference ====
Team	W	L	PCT	GB	Home	Road
x-Reno Bighorns (2)	34	16	.680	–	20–5	14–11
x-Rio Grande Valley Vipers (3)	33	17	.660	1	17–8	16–9
x-Tulsa 66ers (4)	33	17	.660	1	17–8	16–9
x-Bakersfield Jam (6)	29	21	.580	5	17–8	12–13
x-Utah Flash (7)	28	22	.560	6	16–9	12–13
x-Texas Legends (8)	24	26	.480	10	15–10	9–16
Idaho Stampede	24	26	.480	10	12–13	12–13
Austin Toros	22	28	.440	12	13–12	9–16
New Mexico Thunderbirds	20	30	.400	14	13–12	7–18

Notes

- x indicates a team that has qualified for the playoffs
- Number in parentheses indicates the team's seeding for the playoffs.

=== Statistics leaders ===
Category	Player	Team	Statistic
Points per game	Trey Johnson	Bakersfield Jam	25.5
Rebounds per game	Jeff Adrien	Rio Grande Valley Vipers; Erie BayHawks	11.4
Assists per game	Curtis Stinson	Iowa Energy	9.8
Steals per game	Chris Lofton	Iowa Energy	2.1
Blocks per game	Sean Williams	Texas Legends	2.9
Field goal percentage	Latavious Williams	Tulsa 66ers	.639
Three-point field goal percentage	Moses Ehambe	Iowa Energy; Austin Toros	.495
Free throw percentage	Blake Ahearn	Erie BayHawks	.962
Double-doubles	Curtis Stinson	Iowa Energy	28
Triple-doubles	Curtis Stinson	Iowa Energy	5

== All-Star Weekend ==
=== All-Star Game ===
The fifth annual NBA D-League All-Star Game was held during the 2011 NBA All-Star Weekend in Los Angeles. The game was played in the Los Angeles Convention Center on February 19. The Eastern Conference All-Stars defeated the Western Conference All-Stars 115–108, led by Iowa Energy center Courtney Sims. Sims scored a game-high 25 points and was named as the MVP of the game. This is the second All-Star MVP honors for Sims after being named as the co-MVP in the 2009 All-Star Game.

NBA TV

February 19
5:00 p.m. ET

Recap

Eastern Conference All-Stars 115, Western Conference All-Stars 108
Scoring by half: 58–54, 57–54
Pts: Courtney Sims 25; Rebs: Ivan Johnson 10; Asts: Walker Russell Jr. 10	Pts: Sean Williams 21; Rebs: Sean Williams 8 Asts: Orien Greene 8

Los Angeles Convention Center, Los Angeles
Referees:
- #32 Tre Maddox
- #31 Karl Lane
- #17 Scott Twardoski

=== Dream Factory Friday Night ===
The fourth annual NBA D-League Dream Factory Friday Night was held on February 18 during the 2011 NBA All-Star Weekend. The events included a slam dunk contest, a three-point shooting contest and a shooting stars competition, all of which are also annual competitions in the NBA All-Star Saturday Night. In the Slam Dunk Contest, the reigning champion Dar Tucker of the New Mexico Thunderbirds retained his title as the D-League Slam Dunk Champion after defeating Dakota Wizards center Chris Johnson in the final round with a score of 96–93. Texas Legends guard Booker Woodfox, who also won the Three-Point Contest during the D-League Showcase in January, won the Three-Point Shooting Contest. The Shooting Stars Competition was won by the team of Shane Edwards (New Mexico Thunderbirds), Orien Greene (Utah Flash) and Jeremy Wise (Bakersfield Jam).

== Playoffs ==
The Eastern and Western Conference winners, along with the next six teams with the best regular season records regardless of conference, qualified for the playoffs. The playoffs consist of three rounds with best-of-three format. Teams with the better regular season record holds home-court advantage in every rounds. The teams were seeded from 1 to 8 based on their regular season records. The top three seeds had to choose their opponents in the first round from among the four lowest seeded teams. The fourth seeded team would be paired with the remaining team that is not chosen as an opponent by the top three seeds. The first seed, Iowa Energy, selected the seventh seed, Utah Flash; the second seed, Reno Bighorns, selected the fifth seed Erie BayHawks; and the third seed, Rio Grande Valley Vipers, selected the sixth seed Bakersfield Jam. The two remaining teams, the fourth seed Tulsa 66ers and the eighth seed Texas Legends, faced each other in the last matchup.

First round
1	**Iowa***	**2**
7	Utah	1
4	**Tulsa**	**2**
8	Texas	0
2	**Reno***	**2**
5	Erie	1
3	**Rio Grande Valley**	**2**
6	Bakersfield	1

Second round
1	**Iowa***	**2**
4	Tulsa	0
2	Reno*	0
3	**Rio Grande Valley**	**2**

Finals
1	**Iowa***	**2**
3	Rio Grande Valley	1

Notes

- The numbers to the left of each team indicate the team's seeding.
- The numbers to the right indicate the number of games the team won in that round.
- The conference champions are marked by an asterisk (*).
- Teams in **bold** advanced to the next round.
- Teams in italics have home-court advantage in that round.

=== First round ===
==== (1) Iowa Energy vs. (7) Utah Flash ====
April 6

Recap
Boxscore

**Iowa Energy** **103**, Utah Flash 96
Scoring by quarter: 34–22, 23–23, 15–28, 31–23

McKay Events Center, Orem, Utah

April 11

Recap
Boxscore

**Utah Flash** **119**, Iowa Energy 118
Scoring by quarter: 30–24, 25–35, 25–22, 39–37

Wells Fargo Arena, Des Moines, Iowa

April 12

Recap
Boxscore

Utah Flash 107, **Iowa Energy** **112**
Scoring by quarter: 25–21, 34–32, 26–33, 22–26
**Iowa wins series, 2–1**

Wells Fargo Arena, Des Moines, Iowa

==== (2) Reno Bighorns vs. (5) Erie BayHawks ====
April 10

Recap
Boxscore

**Reno Bighorns** **106**, Erie BayHawks 101
Scoring by quarter: 30–26, 20–29, 21–26, 35–20

Tullio Arena, Erie, Pennsylvania

April 12

Recap
Boxscore

**Erie BayHawks** **114**, Reno Bighorns 111
Scoring by quarter: 22–30, 36–24, 29–33, 27–24

Reno Events Center, Reno, Nevada

April 14

Recap
Boxscore

Erie BayHawks 87, **Reno Bighorns** **99**
Scoring by quarter: 23–21, 20–26, 25–24, 19–28
**Reno wins series, 2–1**

Reno Events Center, Reno, Nevada

==== (3) Rio Grande Valley Vipers vs. (6) Bakersfield Jam ====
April 8

Recap
Boxscore

Rio Grande Valley Vipers 105, **Bakersfield Jam** **110**
Scoring by quarter: 29–23, 37–31, 21–25, 18–31

Jam Events Center, Bakersfield, California

April 12

Recap
Boxscore

Bakersfield Jam 92, **Rio Grande Valley Vipers** **104**
Scoring by quarter: 21–23, 24–27, 27–27, 20–27

State Farm Arena, Hidalgo, Texas

April 13

Recap
Boxscore

Bakersfield Jam 99, **Rio Grande Valley Vipers** **112**
Scoring by quarter: 27–25, 26–34, 22–28, 24–25
**Rio Grande Valley wins series, 2–1**

State Farm Arena, Hidalgo, Texas

==== (4) Tulsa 66ers vs. (8) Texas Legends ====
April 6

Recap
Boxscore

**Tulsa 66ers** **94**, Texas Legends 83
Scoring by quarter: 22–23, 26–25, 18–21, 28–14

Dr Pepper Arena, Frisco, Texas

April 8

Recap
Boxscore

Texas Legends 89, **Tulsa 66ers** **104**
Scoring by quarter: 19–32, 24–17, 15–27, 31–28
**Tulsa wins series, 2–0**

Tulsa Convention Center, Tulsa, Oklahoma

=== Second round ===
==== (1) Iowa Energy vs. (4) Tulsa 66ers ====
April 15

Recap
Boxscore

**Iowa Energy** **103**, Tulsa 66ers 96
Scoring by quarter: 26–17, 20–27, 33–25, 24–27

Tulsa Convention Center, Tulsa, Oklahoma

April 18

Recap
Boxscore

Tulsa 66ers 94, **Iowa Energy** **107**
Scoring by quarter: 19–30, 32–22, 18–33, 25–22
**Iowa wins series, 2–0**

Wells Fargo Arena, Des Moines, Iowa

==== (2) Reno Bighorns vs. (3) Rio Grande Valley Vipers ====
April 17

Recap
Boxscore

Reno Bighorns 96, **Rio Grande Valley Vipers** **98** (OT)
Scoring by quarter: 20–26, 22–24, 27–29, 23–13, Overtime: 4–6

State Farm Arena, Hidalgo, Texas

April 20

Recap
Boxscore

**Rio Grande Valley Vipers** **134**, Reno Bighorns 126 (OT)
Scoring by quarter: 25–27, 30–32, 32–34, 34–28, Overtime: 13–5
**Rio Grande Valley wins series, 2–0**

Reno Events Center, Reno, Nevada

=== Finals ===
==== (1) Iowa Energy vs. (3) Rio Grande Valley Vipers ====
April 24
8:00 p.m. ET

Recap
Boxscore

**Iowa Energy** **123**, Rio Grande Valley Vipers 106
Scoring by quarter: 28–37, 31–26, 29–9, 35–34
Pts: Curtis Stinson 29; Rebs: Curtis Stinson 10; Asts: Hannah, Stinson 10 each	Pts: Mouhammad Faye 22; Rebs: Mouhammad Faye 9 Asts: Terrel Harris 6

State Farm Arena, Hidalgo, Texas
Attendance: 4,096
Referees:
- #40 J. T. Orr
- #32 Tre Maddox
- #43 Kevin Scott

April 27
8:00 p.m. ET

Recap
Boxscore

**Rio Grande Valley Vipers** **141**, Iowa Energy 122
Scoring by quarter: 27–29, 38–34, 41–24, 35–35
Pts: Jerel McNeal 37; Rebs: Mouhammad Faye 12; Asts: Jerel McNeal 8	Pts: Moses Ehambe 33; Rebs: Curtis Stinson 10; Asts: Curtis Stinson 12

Wells Fargo Arena, Des Moines, Iowa
Attendance: 14,036
Referees:
- #17 Scott Twardoski
- #31 Karl Lane
- #12 Scott Bolnick

April 29
8:00 p.m. ET

Recap
Boxscore

Rio Grande Valley Vipers 111, **Iowa Energy** **119**
Scoring by quarter: 39–34, 22–28, 27–19, 23–38
Pts: Jerel McNeal 29; Rebs: Jerel McNeal 11; Asts: Jerel McNeal 6	Pts: Stefhon Hannah 31; Rebs: Stanley Robinson 11; Asts: Curtis Stinson 4
**Iowa wins series, 2–1**

Wells Fargo Arena, Des Moines, Iowa
Attendance: 9,054
Referees:
- #31 Karl Lane
- #32 Tre Maddox
- #40 J. T. Orr

== Awards and honors ==
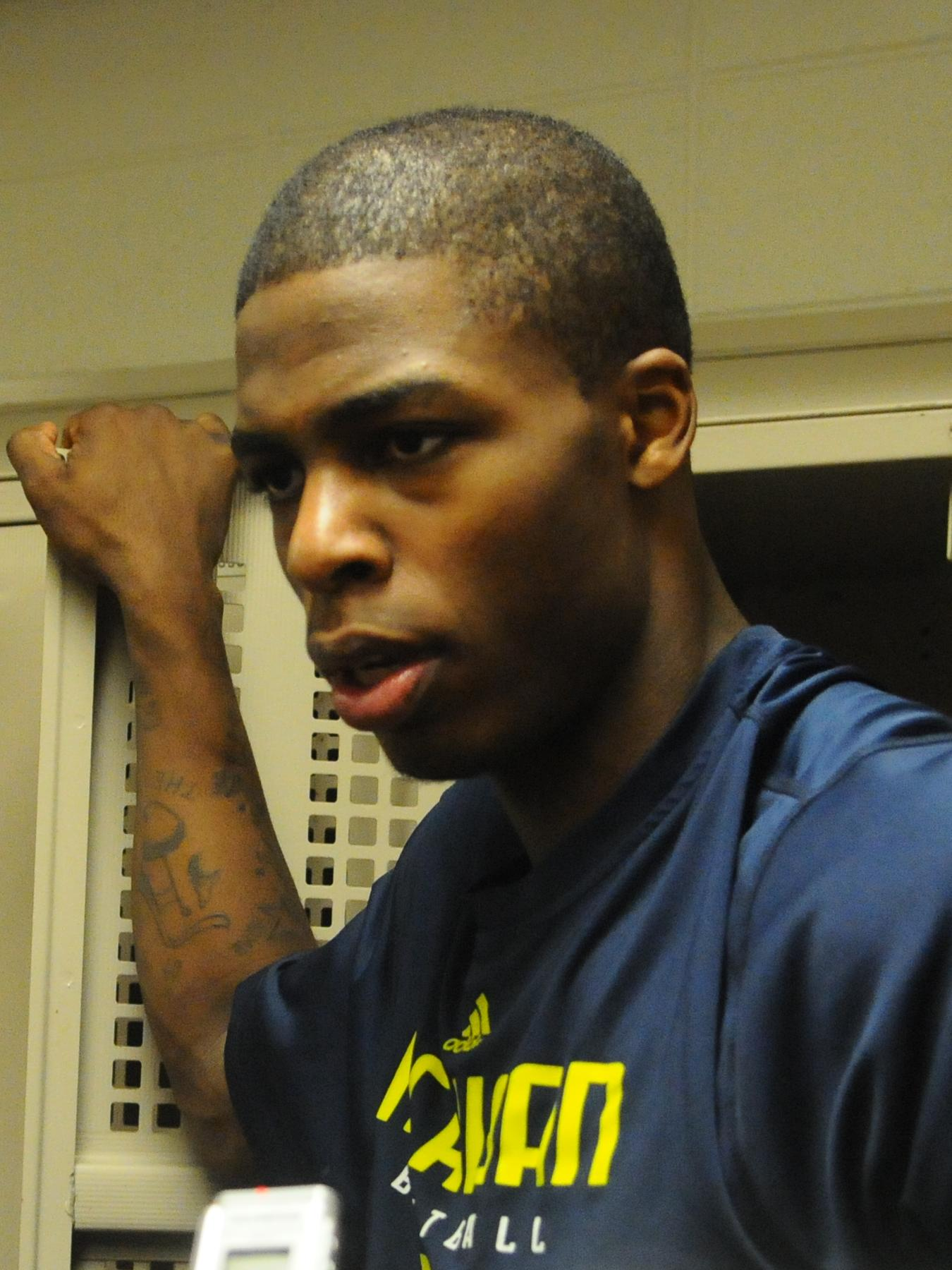
Former Michigan Wolverines DeShawn Sims won the Rookie of the Year Award.

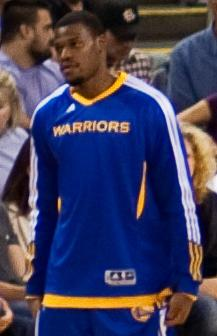
Jeff Adrien won the Impact Player of the Year Award despite only playing 22 games.

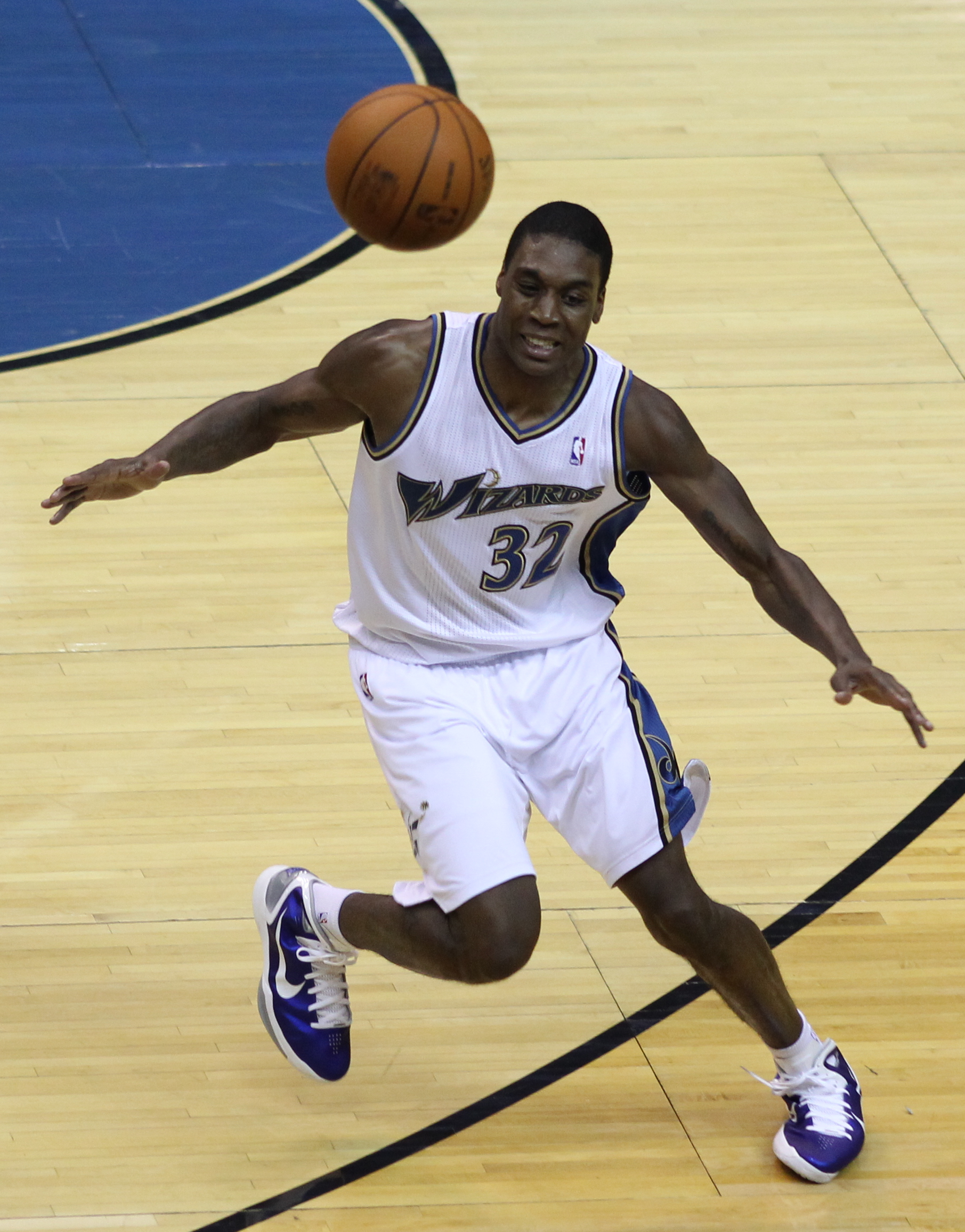
Larry Owens won the Sportsmanship Award and was named to the All-NBA D-League Second Team.

- Most Valuable Player: Curtis Stinson (Iowa Energy)
- Coach of the Year: Nick Nurse (Iowa Energy)
- Rookie of the Year: DeShawn Sims (Maine Red Claws)
- Defensive Player of the Year: Chris Johnson (Dakota Wizards)
- Impact Player of the Year: Jeff Adrien (Erie BayHawks / Rio Grande Valley Vipers)
- Most Improved Player: Dar Tucker (Texas Legends / New Mexico Thunderbirds)
- Executive of the Year: Bert Garcia (Rio Grande Valley Vipers)
- Sportsmanship Award: Larry Owens (Tulsa 66ers)

- All-NBA D-League First Team:
  - G Trey Johnson (Bakersfield Jam)
  - G Curtis Stinson (Iowa Energy)
  - F Ivan Johnson (Erie BayHawks)
  - F Joe Alexander (Texas Legends)
  - C Chris Johnson (Dakota Wizards)
- All-NBA D-League Second Team:
  - G Othyus Jeffers (Iowa Energy)
  - G Orien Greene (Utah Flash)
  - F Jeff Adrien (Erie BayHawks / Rio Grande Valley Vipers)
  - F Larry Owens (Tulsa 66ers)
  - C Marcus Cousin (Austin Toros / Rio Grande Valley Vipers)

- All-NBA D-League Third Team:
  - G Jerel McNeal (Rio Grande Valley Vipers)
  - G Antonio Daniels (Texas Legends)
  - F Patrick Ewing Jr. (Reno Bighorns / Sioux Falls Skyforce)
  - F DeShawn Sims (Maine Red Claws)
  - C Sean Williams (Texas Legends)

- All-Rookie First Team:
  - G Jerome Dyson (Tulsa 66ers)
  - G Scottie Reynolds (Springfield Armor)
  - F DeShawn Sims (Maine Red Claws)
  - F Marqus Blakely (Iowa Energy)
  - C Patrick Sullivan (Rio Grande Valley Vipers)
- All-Rookie Second Team:
  - G Elijah Millsap (Tulsa 66ers)
  - G Jamar Smith (Maine Red Claws)
  - F Tasmin Mitchell (Erie BayHawks)
  - F Mouhammad Faye (Rio Grande Valley Vipers)
  - C Chas McFarland (Springfield Armor)

- All-Defensive First Team:
  - G Orien Greene (Utah Flash)
  - G Othyus Jeffers (Iowa Energy)
  - F Tony Gaffney (Utah Flash)
  - F Larry Owens (Tulsa 66ers)
  - C Chris Johnson (Dakota Wizards)
  - C Sean Williams (Texas Legends)
- All-Defensive Second Team:
  - G Cedric Jackson (Erie BayHawks / Idaho Stampede)
  - G Mario West (Maine Red Claws)
  - F Ivan Johnson (Erie BayHawks)
  - F Ronald Dupree (Utah Flash)
  - C Marcus Cousin (Austin Toros / Rio Grande Valley Vipers)

- Player of the Month:
  - December: Trey Johnson (Bakersfield Jam)
  - January: Jeff Adrien (Rio Grande Valley Vipers)
  - February: Ivan Johnson (Erie BayHawks) and Curtis Stinson (Iowa Energy)
  - March: Curtis Stinson (Iowa Energy)
- Performers of the Week:
  - November 18–21: Courtney Sims (Iowa Energy)
  - November 22–28: Othyus Jeffers (Iowa Energy)
  - November 29–December 5: Walker Russell Jr. (Fort Wayne Mad Ants)
  - December 6–12: Trey Johnson (Bakersfield Jam)
  - December 13–19: Dar Tucker and Shane Edwards (both New Mexico Thunderbirds)
  - December 20–26: Oliver Lafayette (Fort Wayne Mad Ants)
  - December 27–January 2: Othyus Jeffers (Iowa Energy)
  - January 3–9: Chris Lofton (Iowa Energy) and Jeff Adrien (Rio Grande Valley Vipers)
  - January 10–16: Marcus Landry and Jeremy Lin (both Reno Bighorns)
  - January 17–23: Curtis Stinson (Iowa Energy)
  - January 24–30: Jerome Dyson (Tulsa 66ers)
  - January 31–February 6: Derrick Byars (Bakersfield Jam)
  - February 7–13: Ivan Johnson and Blake Ahearn (both Erie BayHawks)
  - February 21–27: Brandon Costner (Utah Flash) and Jerel McNeal (Rio Grande Valley Vipers)
  - February 28–March 6: Leo Lyons (Austin Toros)
  - March 7–13: Tasmin Mitchell (Erie BayHawks) and Patrick Ewing Jr. (Sioux Falls Skyforce)
  - March 14–20: Curtis Stinson and Marqus Blakely (both Iowa Energy)
  - March 21–27: Jamine Peterson (New Mexico Thunderbirds)
  - March 28–April 3: Joe Alexander (Texas Legends)
