= Larry Owens (basketball) =

American basketball player (born 1983)

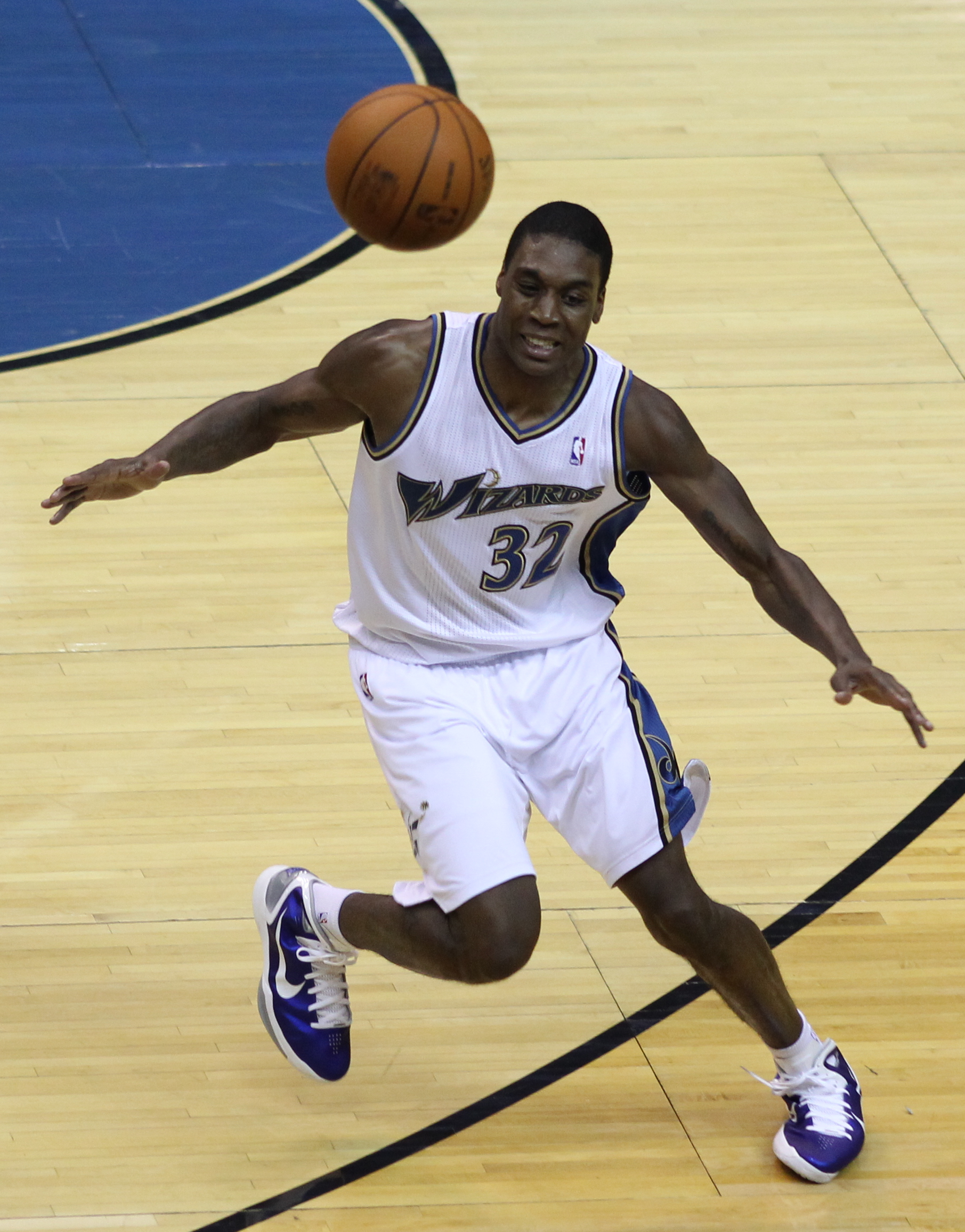
- Owens with the Washington Wizards in 2011

Personal information
- Born: January 8, 1983 (age 43) Mesa, Arizona, U.S.
- Listed height: 6 ft 7 in (2.01 m)
- Listed weight: 210 lb (95 kg)

Career information
- High school: Westwood (Mesa, Arizona)
- College: Yavapai (2001–2003); Oral Roberts (2004–2006)
- NBA draft: 2006: undrafted
- Playing career: 2006–2018
- Position: Shooting guard / small forward
- Number: 33, 32, 24

Career history
- 2006–2007: Stade Clermontois
- 2007–2009: Liège Basket
- 2009–2012: Tulsa 66ers
- 2011: San Antonio Spurs
- 2011: Washington Wizards
- 2012: New Jersey Nets
- 2012–2013: JDA Dijon Basket
- 2013: Tulsa 66ers
- 2013–2015: Iowa Energy
- 2014: Halcones Rojos Veracruz
- 2015–2016: Kyoto Hannaryz
- 2016–2017: Nishinomiya Storks

Career highlights
- NBA D-League All-Star (2011); All-NBA D-League Second Team (2011); All-NBA D-League Third Team (2010); NBA D-League All-Defensive First Team (2011); NBA D-League All-Defensive Second Team (2012); First-team All-MCC (2006); MCC Defensive Player of the Year (2006); MCC All-Newcomer Team (2005); Second-team NJCAA All-American (2003)
- Stats at NBA.com
- Stats at Basketball Reference

Larry Owens (born January 8, 1983) is an American former professional basketball player. He played college basketball for Yavapai College and the Oral Roberts Golden Eagles.

== College career ==
=== Yavapai College (2001–2003) ===
Owens averaged 22.7 points and 10.6 rebounds per game as a sophomore at Yavapai College. In 2003, he was named in the second team NJCAA All-American and the ACCAC MVP.

Following his sophomore season, he transferred to Oral Roberts University.

=== Oral Roberts (2004–2006) ===
After sitting out the 2003–04 season due to NCAA transfer rules, Owens joined the Golden Eagles for his redshirted junior season in 2004–05. He was named in the Mid-Con All-Newcomer team after outstanding first season. In 33 games, he averaged 9.2 points, 7.5 rebounds, 2.5 assists, 1.8 steals and 1.0 blocks per game.

In his senior season, he was named in the 2006 All-MCC first team as well as being named the 2006 All-MCC Defensive Player of the Year. In 33 games, he averaged 12.5 points, 7.9 rebounds, 3.2 assists, 1.5 steals and 1.2 blocks per game.

== Professional career ==
=== 2006–07 season ===
Owens went undrafted in the 2006 NBA draft. He was later drafted by the Mississippi Hardhats of the World Basketball Association (WBA). He left the Hardhats after pre-season. He then moved to Stade Clermontois BA of France for the 2006–07 season.

=== 2007–08 season ===
Owens joined the Miami Heat for the 2007 NBA Summer League. Later that year, he signed with Liège Basket of Belgium for the 2007–08 season.

=== 2008–09 season ===
Owens joined the New Orleans Hornets for the 2008 NBA Summer League. Later that year, he re-signed with Liège Basket for the 2008–09 season.

=== 2009–10 season ===
Owens re-joined the New Orleans Hornets for the 2009 NBA Summer League. On September 28, 2009, he signed with the Hornets. However, he was later waived by the Hornets on October 21, 2009. On November 1, 2009, he was acquired by the Tulsa 66ers.

=== 2010–11 season ===
Owens joined the NBA D-League Select team for the 2010 NBA Summer League. He later signed with Türk Telekom B.K. of Turkey but left before the playing in a game for them. On October 30, 2010, he was re-acquired by the Tulsa 66ers.

On January 16, 2011, he signed with the San Antonio Spurs on a 10-day contract. He made his NBA debut on that same day against the Denver Nuggets, picking up an assist and a rebound in two minutes of playing time. On January 26, 2011, Owens signed a second 10-day contract with the Spurs. After his second 10-day contract expired, he re-joined the Tulsa 66ers.

On April 6, 2011, he signed with Washington Wizards for the remainder of the 2010–11 season.

=== 2011–12 season ===
On December 10, 2011, Owens re-signed with the Wizards. However, he was later waived by the Wizards on December 21, 2011. On December 28, he was re-acquired by the Tulsa 66ers.

On January 18, 2012, he signed with the New Jersey Nets. On January 31, 2012, he was waived by the Nets. On February 4, he returned to the 66ers.

=== 2012–13 season ===
Owens joined the Boston Celtics for the 2012 NBA Summer League. In August 2012, he joined BCM Gravelines of France but left after pre-season. In September 2012, he had a try-out with Budivelnyk Kyiv of Ukraine but was not signed. In November 2012, he signed with JDA Dijon Basket France for the 2012–13 season.

=== 2013–14 season ===
On October 31, 2013, he was re-acquired by the Tulsa 66ers. On December 19, 2013, he was traded to the Iowa Energy.

=== 2014–15 season ===
On August 27, 2014, Owens signed with Halcones Rojos Veracruz of Mexico for the 2014–15 LNBP season. In November 2014, he left the team after appearing in 13 games. On January 3, 2015, he was reacquired by the Iowa Energy.

=== 2015–16 season ===
On August 12, 2015, Owens signed with Kyoto Hannaryz of the Japanese bj league.

Owens competes for Team 23 in The Basketball Tournament. He was a forward on the 2015 team who made it to the $1 million championship game, falling 67–65 to Overseas Elite.

=== 2024-2025 Season ===
On December 2nd, 2024 Larry signed on with the Tulsa Scheels of the Retail Leagues of America (RLA).

== NBA career statistics ==
Legend
GP	Games played	GS	Games started	MPG	Minutes per game
FG%	Field goal percentage	3P%	3-point field goal percentage	FT%	Free throw percentage
RPG	Rebounds per game	APG	Assists per game	SPG	Steals per game
BPG	Blocks per game	PPG	Points per game	**Bold**	Career high

=== Regular season ===
Year	Team	GP	GS	MPG	FG%	3P%	FT%	RPG	APG	SPG	BPG	PPG
2010–11	San Antonio	**7**	0	4.4	**.500**	.333	.500	.6	.1	.3	.0	1.3
2010–11	Washington	5	0	**22.4**	.462	**.500**	.400	**2.2**	**1.4**	**1.4**	**1.0**	**6.2**
2011–12	New Jersey	**7**	0	10.7	.364	.400	**.750**	1.9	.6	.0	.1	1.9
Career		19	0	11.5	.442	.444	.538	1.5	0.6	0.5	.3	2.8
