= NBA G League Most Valuable Player Award =

Annual award

The NBA G League Most Valuable Player (MVP) is an annual NBA G League award given since the league's inaugural season to the best performing player of the regular season. The league's head coaches determine the award by voting and it is usually presented to the honoree during the G-League playoffs.

Mac McClung is the only player to have been named the MVP more than once (2024, 2026), and only one international player has won the award. Ansu Sesay was the inaugural winner while playing for the Greenville Groove. By position, guards have won the award with 12 winners, followed by forwards with eight. Only one center has won, Courtney Sims in 2008–09.

== Winners ==
Denotes the year co-MVPs were named.

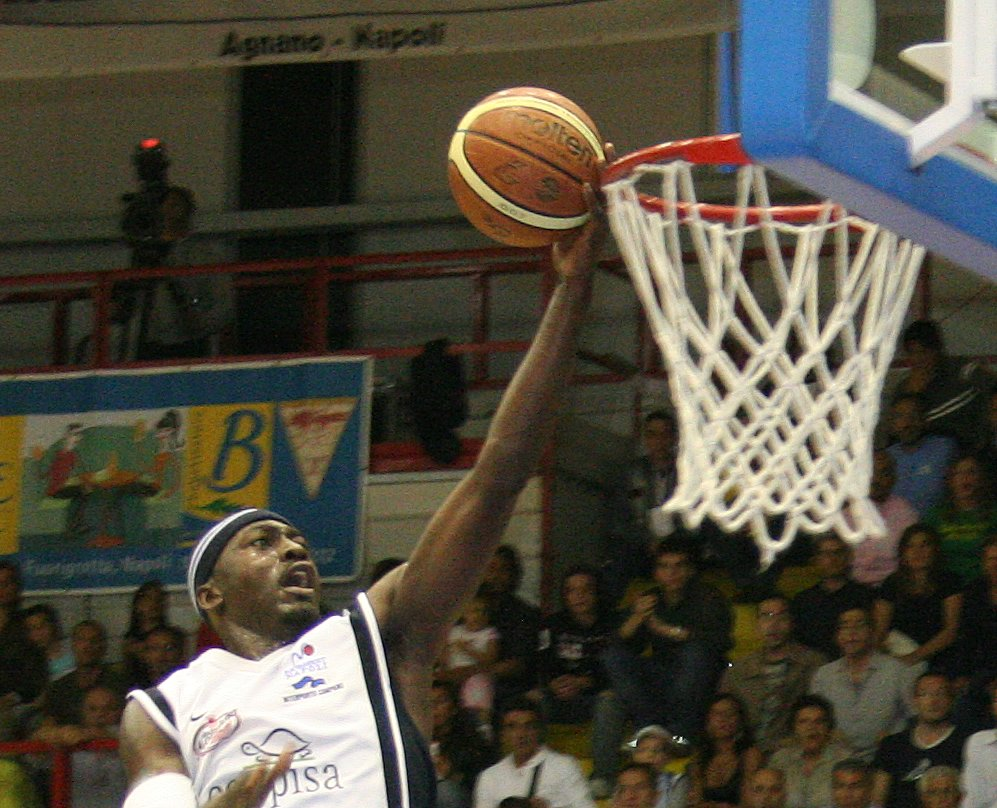
Ansu Sesay won the league's first award in 2002.

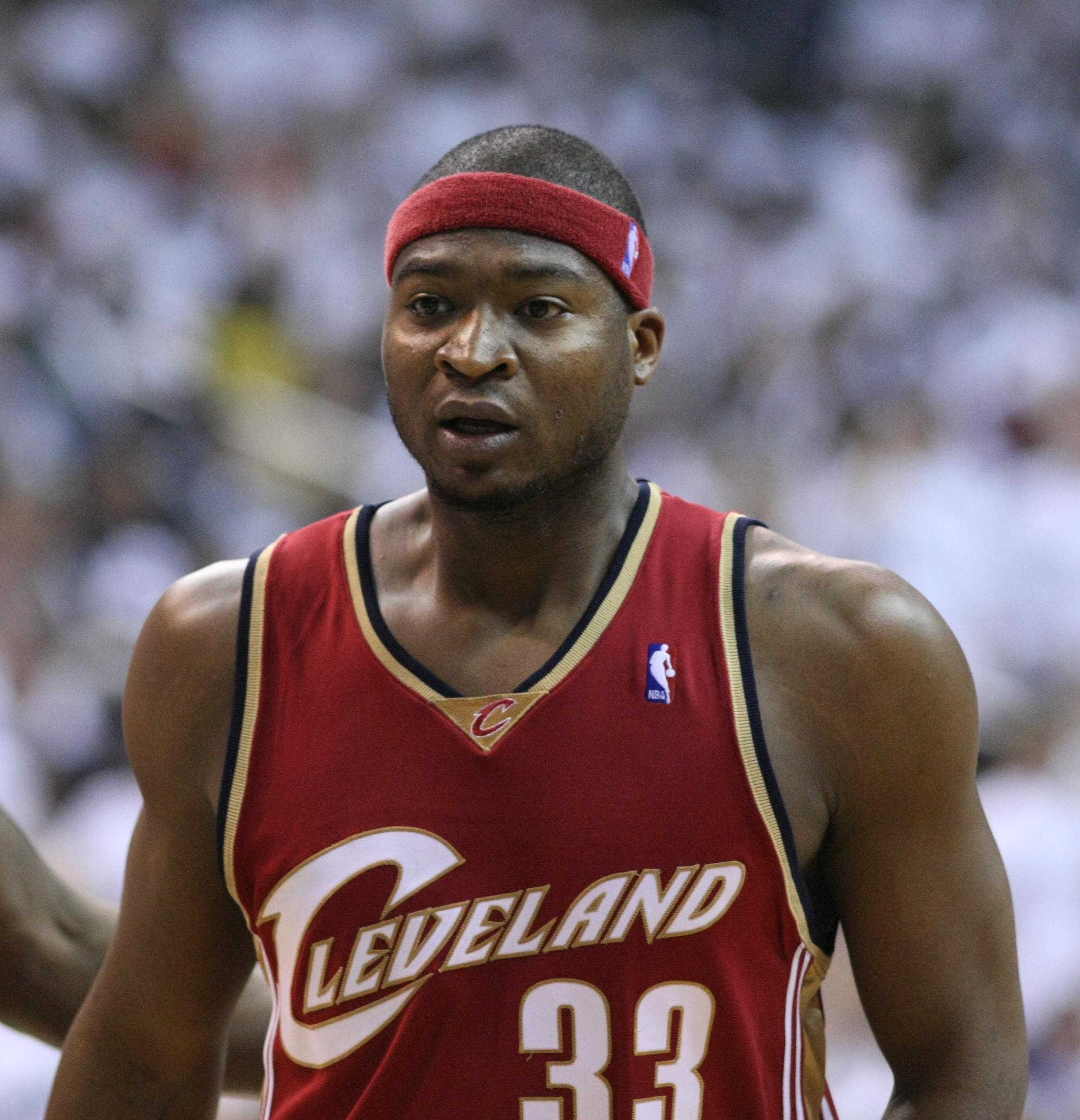
Devin Brown won the award in 2003 while playing for the Fayetteville Patriots.

Season	Player	Position	Nationality	Team
2001–02	Ansu Sesay	Forward	United States	Greenville Groove
2002–03	Devin Brown	Guard	United States	Fayetteville Patriots
2003–04	Tierre Brown	Guard	United States	Charleston Lowgators
2004–05	Matt Carroll	Guard	United States	Roanoke Dazzle
2005–06	Marcus Fizer	Forward	United States	Austin Toros
2006–07	Randy Livingston	Guard	United States	Idaho Stampede
2007–08	Kasib Powell	Forward	United States	Sioux Falls Skyforce
2008–09	Courtney Sims	Center	United States	Iowa Energy
2009–10	Mike Harris	Forward	United States	Rio Grande Valley Vipers
2010–11	Curtis Stinson	Guard	United States	Iowa Energy (2)
2011–12	Justin Dentmon	Guard	United States	Austin Toros (2)
2012–13	Drew Goudelock	Guard	United States	Rio Grande Valley Vipers (2)
2013–14	Ron Howard	Guard	United States	Fort Wayne Mad Ants
2013–14	Othyus Jeffers	Forward	United States	Iowa Energy (3)
2014–15	Tim Frazier	Guard	United States	Maine Red Claws
2015–16	Jarnell Stokes	Forward	United States	Sioux Falls Skyforce (2)
2016–17	Vander Blue	Guard	United States	Los Angeles D-Fenders
2017–18	Lorenzo Brown	Guard	United States	Raptors 905
2018–19	Chris Boucher	Forward	Canada	Raptors 905 (2)
2019–20	Frank Mason III	Guard	United States	Wisconsin Herd
2020–21	Paul Reed	Forward	United States	Delaware Blue Coats
2021–22	Trevelin Queen	Shooting guard	United States	Rio Grande Valley Vipers (3)
2022–23	Carlik Jones	Point guard	United States	Windy City Bulls
2023–24	Mac McClung	Guard	United States	Osceola Magic
2024–25	JD Davison	Point guard	United States	Maine Celtics
2025–26	Mac McClung (2)	Guard	United States	Windy City Bulls

== See also ==
- NBA Most Valuable Player Award
