= 2010 NBA Development League expansion draft =

General information
- Sport: Basketball
- Date(s): August 31, 2010
- Location: New York, New York

Overview
- League: NBA
- Expansion teams: Texas Legends

The 2010 NBA Development League expansion draft was the fifth expansion draft of the National Basketball Association Development League (NBADL). The draft was held on August 31, 2010, so that the newly founded Texas Legends could acquire players for the upcoming 2010–11 season. All 14 of the available players in the draft pool came from the 2009–10 Los Angeles D-Fenders roster, who had to place their team on hiatus for 2010–11. The Legends were allowed to claim the rights to 10 of Los Angeles' 14 players. Besides the dispersal of the D-Fenders' roster, Texas was also able to draft local talent from the greater Frisco area.

Two of the players that the Legends chose had previously been named NBA D-League All-Stars: Joe Crawford and Diamon Simpson. Crawford had also been an NBA draft selection back in 2008 for the Los Angeles Lakers. The four Los Angeles D-Fenders that were not selected by the Legends out of the pool of 14 were Lawrence McKenzie (G), Ray Reese (F), Rodney Webb (F) and Horace Wormely (G).

== Key ==
Pos.	G	F	C
Position	Guard	Forward	Center

^	Denotes player who has been selected to (an) NBA Development League All-Star Game(s)
*	Denotes player who has been selected to (an) NBA Development League All-Star Game(s) and was also selected in an NBA draft
†	Denotes player who was also selected in an NBA Draft

== Draft ==
Pick	Player	Pos.	Nationality	Team	College
1	Keith Clark	F	United States	Texas Legends	Oklahoma
2	Joe Crawford*	G	United States	Texas Legends	Kentucky
3	Michael Fey	C	United States	Texas Legends	UCLA
4	Ryan Forehan-Kelly	G/F	United States	Texas Legends	California
5	Gabriel Hughes	C	United States	Texas Legends	California
6	James Peters	F	United States	Texas Legends	UNLV
7	Frank Robinson	G	United States	Texas Legends	Cal State Fullerton
8	Diamon Simpson^{^}	F	United States	Texas Legends	Saint Mary's (CA)
9	Dar Tucker	G	United States	Texas Legends	DePaul
10	James "Mookie" Wright	G	United States	Texas Legends	Colorado
