= Orien Greene =

American basketball player (born 1982)

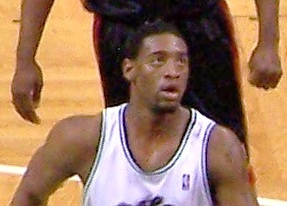
- Greene with the Boston Celtics in 2006

Personal information
- Born: February 4, 1982 (age 44) Gainesville, Florida, U.S.
- Listed height: 6 ft 4 in (1.93 m)
- Listed weight: 208 lb (94 kg)

Career information
- High school: Gainesville (Gainesville, Florida)
- College: Florida (2000–2002); Louisiana (2003–2005)
- NBA draft: 2005: 2nd round, 53rd overall pick
- Drafted by: Boston Celtics
- Playing career: 2005–2017
- Position: Guard
- Number: 0, 5

Career history
- 2005–2006: Boston Celtics
- 2006–2007: Indiana Pacers
- 2007: Sacramento Kings
- 2007–2008: New Zealand Breakers
- 2008: Hapoel Jerusalem
- 2008–2009: MyGuide Amsterdam
- 2009–2011: Utah Flash
- 2011: New Jersey Nets
- 2011: Halifax Rainmen
- 2011–2013: Los Angeles D-Fenders
- 2013: Reno Bighorns
- 2013–2014: Al Alhy Benghazi
- 2014: Fuerza Regia
- 2015: Ostioneros de Guaymas
- 2015: Louaize
- 2017: Guaros de Lara

Career highlights
- All-NBA D-League Second Team (2011); Sun Belt Defensive Player of the Year (2005); Third-team Parade All-American (2000); Florida Mr. Basketball (2000)
- Stats at NBA.com
- Stats at Basketball Reference

Orien Randolph Greene II (born February 4, 1982) is an American former professional basketball player. His first two professional seasons were spent with the NBA's Boston Celtics and Indiana Pacers, respectively. He played briefly with the Sacramento Kings in 2007, and with the New Jersey Nets in 2011.

== College career ==
A highly touted prospect coming out of high school, the 6-foot-4-inch (1.93 m) point guard originally chose to attend the University of Florida, his hometown college. However, after a couple of years Greene became dissatisfied with his playing time and decided to transfer to the University of Louisiana at Lafayette where he became known in the Sun Belt Conference for his aggressive play, winning the Defensive Player of the Year award his senior season.

However, in 2007, an NCAA investigation found that Greene had relied on 15 hours of correspondence courses taken through another institution in order to remain eligible for the 2004 spring semester and the entire 2004–05 academic year. NCAA rules do not allow student-athletes to use correspondence courses taken from another institution to remain eligible. According to the NCAA, this was an "obvious error" that should have been caught right away, but the school's then-compliance coordinator director of academic services and registrar all failed to catch it. When school officials learned about the violations, they vacated every game in which Greene participated—43 games in all, including NCAA tournament appearances in 2004 and 2005—and scrubbed Greene's records from the books. The NCAA accepted Louisiana-Lafayette's penalties and also imposed two years' probation.

== Professional career ==
Greene was drafted in 2005 NBA draft with the 53rd overall pick by the Boston Celtics.

Greene began his pro career as backup to Delonte West. His status as the backup point guard was cemented by a season-ending injury to Dan Dickau and the trade of Marcus Banks to the Minnesota Timberwolves.

On March 29, 2006, Greene was suspended by the Boston Celtics for one game after he was charged with driving his sport utility vehicle at more than 90 mph (140 km/h) on a street in suburban Boston.

On June 30, 2006, Greene was waived by the Boston Celtics. He was claimed off waivers by the Indiana Pacers, and played for their 2006–2007 team.

Greene was used very sparingly in his season with the Pacers. He played in only 41 games, averaging 6.2 minutes per game; quite a drop off compared to playing in all but 2 games the previous year with the Celtics and averaging 15.4 minutes per game. The Pacers brought in Darrell Armstrong (from Dallas) and Keith McLeod (from Golden State) to compete with Greene for minutes at point guard. With Jamaal Tinsley holding the starting position, Greene fell to fourth on the depth chart, which resulted in very little playing time. Greene signed with the Sacramento Kings on August 30, 2007. He was waived by the Kings November 15, 2007 after playing just 7 games.

Greene signed a three-month contract with the Australian National Basketball League's New Zealand Breakers in late November 2007. He was signed to replace Wayne Turner, who was out for the season.

In 2010 Greene has been banned for two years for trying to dupe drug testers, backdated to March 12, 2009.

He later played for the Utah Flash of the NBA Development League. On February 1, 2011, Greene re-joined the NBA as he signed a 10-day contract with the New Jersey Nets. Afterwards, he rejoined the Flash.

On November 10, 2011, Orien Greene signed to play basketball for the Halifax Rainmen of the NBL. Shortly afterwards, he joined the Los Angeles D-Fenders of the NBA D-League.

In October 2012, Greene signed with the Milwaukee Bucks. He was waived by the team later that month. Later that month, he was re-acquired by the Los Angeles D-Fenders. On February 25, 2013, Greene was traded to the Reno Bighorns.

In October 2013, he joined Al Alhy Benghazi of Libya.

In December 2014, he joined Fuerza Regia of the Mexican Liga Nacional de Baloncesto Profesional.

On December 31, 2016, Greene signed with Guaros de Lara of the Liga Profesional de Baloncesto.

== NBA statistics ==
Legend
GP	Games played	GS	Games started	MPG	Minutes per game
FG%	Field goal percentage	3P%	3-point field goal percentage	FT%	Free throw percentage
RPG	Rebounds per game	APG	Assists per game	SPG	Steals per game
BPG	Blocks per game	PPG	Points per game	**Bold**	Career high

=== Regular season ===
Year	Team	GP	GS	MPG	FG%	3P%	FT%	RPG	APG	SPG	BPG	PPG
2005–06	Boston	**80**	**5**	**15.4**	.395	**.225**	**.662**	**1.8**	**1.6**	**1.0**	**.1**	**3.2**
2006–07	Indiana	41	0	6.2	.371	.182	.600	1.1	.5	.4	**.1**	1.5
2007–08	Sacramento	7	2	8.7	.273	.000	.000	.9	.4	.4	**.1**	.9
2010–11	New Jersey	3	0	1.7	**.500**	.000	.500	.0	.3	.3	.0	1.0
Career		131	7	11.9	.387	.212	.642	1.5	1.2	.7	.1	2.5
