= Kevin Young (basketball, born 1981) =

American basketball coach (born 1981)

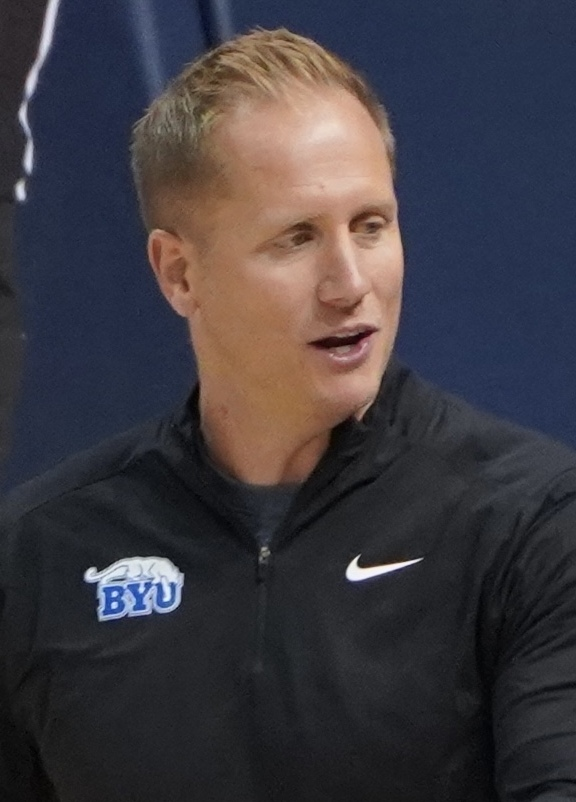
- Young with BYU in 2024

BYU Cougars
- Position: Head coach
- League: Big 12 Conference

Personal information
- Born: November 17, 1981 (age 45) Salt Lake City, Utah, U.S.

Career information
- High school: Sprayberry (Marietta, Georgia)
- College: Middle Georgia (2000–2002); Clayton State (2002–2004)
- Coaching career: 2004–present

Career history

Coaching
- 2004–2005: Oxford College (assistant)
- 2005–2006: Utah Valley (assistant)
- 2006–2007: Shamrock Rovers Hoops
- 2007–2010: Utah Flash (assistant)
- 2010–2011: Utah Flash
- 2011–2013: Iowa Energy
- 2013–2014: Delaware 87ers (assistant)
- 2014–2016: Delaware 87ers
- 2016–2020: Philadelphia 76ers (assistant)
- 2020–2021: Phoenix Suns (assistant)
- 2021–2024: Phoenix Suns (associate HC)
- 2024–present: BYU

Kevin Young (born November 17, 1981) is an American basketball coach and former player who is head coach of the Brigham Young University Cougars. Young has held various coaching roles at the professional, minor league, and collegiate levels in the United States and in other countries. Immediately prior to joining the Cougars, Young was associate head coach for the Phoenix Suns of the National Basketball Association (NBA).

== Playing career ==
Young's own basketball career started in Marietta, Georgia, where he played high school basketball at Sprayberry High School under Coach Roger Kvam. After high school, Young attended Middle Georgia College, a NJCAA establishment. After two years, he transferred to Clayton State University, a Division II university, where he was considered a standout guard.

== Coaching career ==
After finishing his collegiate career, he made his professional head coaching debut at age 23 in Oxford, Georgia with Oxford College. He then headed to Orem, Utah as an assistant coach under Dick Hunsaker at Utah Valley University during the 2005–06 season. He then traveled to Dublin, Ireland with the Shamrock Rovers Hoops in the country's Super League. Returning to the U.S. after one season, he joined the NBA D-League as an assistant coach for the Utah Flash (now the Delaware Blue Coats) for a season under coach Brad Jones.

In 2010, Young was promoted to head coach of the Utah Flash. In that season, he led the team to a record of 28–22, including a nine-game winning streak, before losing to the eventual champion Iowa Energy 2–1 in the first round of the playoffs. After Nick Nurse left the Energy, the team named Young their new head coach for 2011. He coached the Energy for the next two seasons, having an average record the first season and losing in the first round to the Los Angeles D-Fenders (now the South Bay Lakers), before having a worse record the second season and being subsequently fired after starting with a 6–17 record.

Young was then named an assistant coach for the Delaware 87ers (now Delaware Blue Coats), the re-branded team name of the Utah Flash, for a season. He was later meant to be a player development coach for the 87ers before the promotion of head coach Rod Baker to scout for the Philadelphia 76ers led to Young being promoted back to head coach for the newly re-branded franchise. For the next three seasons, there were incremental improvements with the 87ers, going from 20 wins to 21 wins to 26 wins throughout his second coaching tenure with the franchise. However, he was also instrumental for not just helping Thanasis Antetokounmpo get drafted in the 2014 NBA draft, but also seeing four different players scoring season-highs of at least 45 points throughout his second season, with Christian Wood and Jordan McRae growing to be capable NBA players in their careers not long after.

On August 4, 2016, Young was promoted to the role of assistant coach for the Philadelphia 76ers. Outside of an injury plagued first season with the 76ers, in each season afterward, he helped get the 76ers into the playoffs for at least the first round, with highlight appearances in the second round in 2018 and 2019. After Brett Brown was fired in 2020, Young interviewed for the open head coach position before it was ultimately filled by Doc Rivers.

On October 9, 2020, Young was named assistant coach of the Phoenix Suns, reuniting with head coach Monty Williams after a season together as assistant coaches with the 76ers. In his first season with Phoenix, he not only helped the team reach the NBA playoffs for the first time since 2010, but also reach the NBA Finals for the first time since 1993. On August 7, 2021, Young was promoted to the role of associate head coach of the Suns. In his first year as associate head coach, Young became the Suns' acting head coach for a four game stretch in late December and early January, while Monty Williams was in health and safety protocols. Following Young's four game stint as acting head coach, Chris Paul said, ""He did a great job...KY will be a head coach very soon in this league."

In May 2022, Young was featured in ESPN's annual report on potential coaching candidates to watch. The article stated when talking about Young, "If it's alignment you're looking for, Suns associate head coach Kevin Young is a natural fit. Both the Suns' basketball ops crew and head coach Monty Williams regard Young as an essential hub to share ideas across the organization. It's a logical role for a young coach who excels at both listening and communicating. Young served as a head coach in the G League for six seasons, which gave him a foundation as an organizer and big-picture thinker. He has earned the respect of players with his work ethic and candor. He was a finalist for the Washington job last spring, where his sharpness impressed." Young has since been interviewed for head coaching positions with the Houston Rockets, Toronto Raptors, and Milwaukee Bucks, as well as the Phoenix Suns following the report's release.

On June 3, 2023, Young was given a five-year contract extension worth $10 million with the Phoenix Suns, making him the highest-paid assistant coach in the NBA after finishing as the runner-up for the open head coach position for them. He remained in the associate head coach role with the team, with Frank Vogel being the Suns' newest head coach.

On April 16, 2024, Young was named the head coach at BYU, filling the vacancy left by the departure of Mark Pope to the University of Kentucky. He formally joined BYU after the Suns were eliminated in the first round of the 2024 NBA playoffs.

== Head coaching record ==
Record table
Season	Team	Overall	Conference	Standing	Postseason
BYU Cougars (Big 12 Conference) (2024–present)
2024–25	BYU	26–10	14–6	T–3rd	NCAA Division I Sweet 16
2025–26	BYU	23–12	9–9	T–7th	NCAA Division I Round of 64
2026–27	BYU	5–0	0–0		
BYU:		54–22 (.711)	23–15 (.605)		
Total:		54–22 (.711)			

== Personal life ==
Young is married to Melissa Bailey of Omaha, Nebraska; they have two sons and two daughters. He is the great-great-great-great-grandson of Lorenzo Young, the brother of BYU's founder and namesake, Brigham Young. He is a member of the Church of Jesus Christ of Latter-day Saints.
