= Othyus Jeffers =

American basketball player (born 1985)

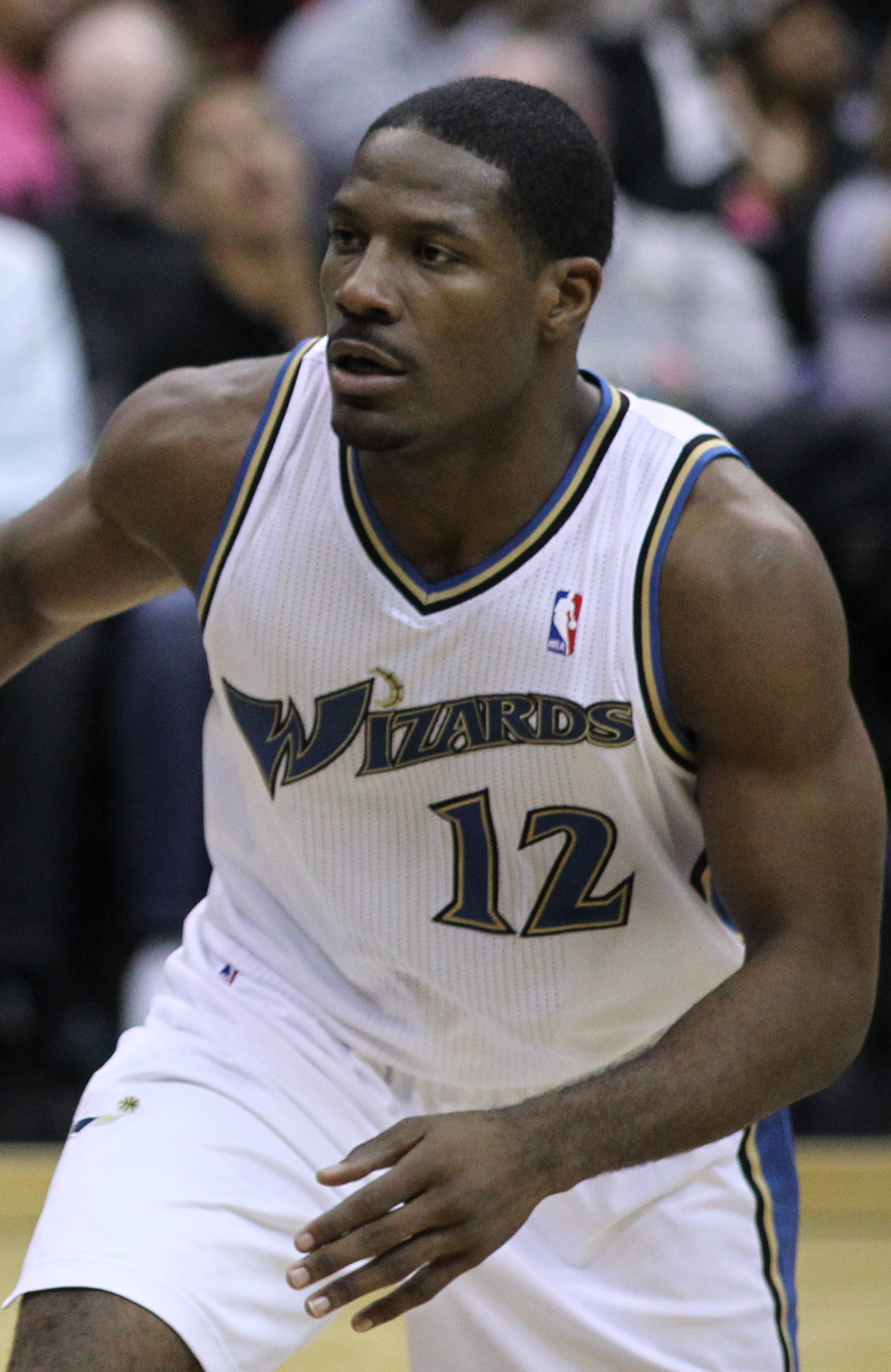
- Jeffers with the Washington Wizards in 2011

Personal information
- Born: August 5, 1985 (age 41) Chicago, Illinois, U.S.
- Listed height: 6 ft 5 in (1.96 m)
- Listed weight: 200 lb (91 kg)

Career information
- High school: Westinghouse (Chicago, Illinois); Hubbard (Chicago, Illinois)
- College: Los Angeles Southwest (2003–2004); UIC (2005–2007); Robert Morris (Illinois) (2007–2008)
- NBA draft: 2008: undrafted
- Playing career: 2008–2016
- Position: Shooting guard / small forward
- Number: 6, 12, 7, 0
- Coaching career: 2016–2019

Career history

Playing
- 2008–2011: Iowa Energy
- 2009: NGC Cantù
- 2010: Utah Jazz
- 2011: San Antonio Spurs
- 2011: Washington Wizards
- 2012–2014: Iowa Energy
- 2014: San Antonio Spurs
- 2014: Minnesota Timberwolves
- 2014: Talk 'N Text Tropang Texters
- 2016: Barangay Ginebra San Miguel

Coaching
- 2016–2017: Robert Morris (Illinois) (associate HC)
- 2017–2019: Robert Morris (Illinois)

Career highlights
- NBA D-League Most Valuable Player (2014); 3× NBA D-League All-Star (2009, 2011, 2014); All-NBA D-League First Team (2014); All-NBA D-League Second Team (2011); 2x NBA D-League All-Defensive First Team (2011, 2014); NBA D-League All-Defensive Third Team (2013); NBA D-League Rookie of the Year (2009)
- Stats at NBA.com
- Stats at Basketball Reference

Othyus Jeffers (born August 5, 1985) is an American former professional basketball player and coach. Jeffers played college basketball with the University of Illinois at Chicago for two years, before transferring to Robert Morris University for his senior season. He then started his professional career with the Iowa Energy of the NBA D-League, a minor league basketball organization owned and run by the NBA. He has had stints with three prior NBA teams: the Utah Jazz, the San Antonio Spurs, and the Washington Wizards. He has also spent a short stint in Italy with NGC Cantù. After his playing career, he returned to Robert Morris and served as head coach of the basketball team from 2017 to 2019.

== Early life ==
Jeffers was born in Chicago, Illinois, to Geraldine Allen. He grew up in the Chicago's West Side. His three older brothers, Henry Allen, Gerome Allen and Edmund Allen, all played basketball in high school and Jeffers often attended his brothers' games and practice. In 1993, when Jeffers was in the third grade, Gerome was shot to death near the family's apartment. Nine years later, during his senior year at Hubbard High School, he lost another brother. Edmund was shot to death in another shooting incident nearby. However, the incident did not stop him from playing basketball, as he and his half-brother and high school teammate, Standell King, attended practice just a day after the incident.

Prior to attending Hubbard, Jeffers attended and played basketball with Westinghouse High School. He transferred to Hubbard as a sophomore and continued to play basketball there. He averaged 22 points and 11 rebounds per game as a junior. In his senior season, he led Hubbard to IHSA Regional and Sectional titles while averaging 28 points and 16 rebounds per game. He graduated as the school's all-time leading rebounder with 1,987 rebounds.

== College career ==
=== Community college and Illinois-Chicago ===
Jeffers, who did not qualify academically for a National Collegiate Athletic Association (NCAA) Division I scholarship, opted to attend Los Angeles Southwest College, a community college near the city of Los Angeles. He starred and averaged 22.3 points and 10.7 rebounds as a freshman. However, after a year, he returned home to Chicago and transferred to the University of Illinois at Chicago (UIC). He reportedly rejected offers from Big East and Big 12 Conference schools and chose to attend Illinois-Chicago in order to be close with his family who lived near the school. He started his college career with the UIC Flames in 2005, after sitting out the 2004–05 season while establishing academic eligibility.

In the 2005–06 season, Jeffers played in all 31 games, 30 as a starter. He led the Flames in rebounding (7.6 rebounds per game) and assists (3.0 assists per game) and also ranked second in scoring with 11.6 points per game. He won the Horizon League Newcomer of The Year awards for his debut season with the Flames. He improved his performance in his junior season by averaging 15.4 points, 8.6 rebounds and 2.6 assists per game in 32 games, all as a starter. He recorded a career-high 27 points and 14 rebounds at the University of Pennsylvania on December 21, 2005. He led the team in both scoring and rebounding and was named in the All-Horizon League First Team. However, he had a difficult relationship and frequently clashed with head coach Jimmy Collins.

=== Shooting incident ===
A few weeks after his junior season finished, Jeffers was shot in the leg while trying to defend his sister from Andre Childs, his sister's boyfriend. His sister earlier called Jeffers for help in a dispute against Childs. Jeffers came to his sister's defense and confronted Childs. After a fight, Childs allegedly pulled a gun fired several shots. Two bullets hit both Jeffers and his sister. Jeffers was shot in the left thigh and his sister was hit in the left calf. Jeffers and his sister survived and Childs was later arrested and charged with attempted murder.

Jeffers was fortunate that the bullet went through his thigh without hitting any major arteries. He left the hospital that night after getting treatment, even though the doctor wanted him to stay overnight for further observation. Jeffers, who wanted to play basketball as soon as possible, was supposed to use crutches for three weeks but he only used them for three days. He then began to play basketball again in less than a month.

=== Robert Morris University ===
After the shooting incident, combined with his conflict with coach Collins, Jeffers transferred schools once again. He transferred to Robert Morris University who played in the National Association of Intercollegiate Athletics (NAIA). By transferring from an NCAA school to an NAIA school, Jeffers did not have to sit out another season. He also switched his major from psychology/sociology to business major. He concluded his college career there by averaging 24.0 points, 11.2 rebounds and 3.3 assists per game as a senior. He led the RMU Eagles to a Chicagoland Collegiate Athletic Conference (CCAC) championship and was named as the CCAC Player of the Year. He then played in the 2007 NAIA Basketball Tournament, leading the Eagles to the Final Four, where they were defeated by the Concordia University. Despite failing to win the championship, Jeffers was named as NAIA Player of the Year by The Sporting News and as co-Player of the Year the Basketball Times.

== Professional career ==
=== Iowa Energy (2008–09) ===
Jeffers was automatically eligible for the 2008 NBA draft after finishing his four-year college eligibility. However, he went undrafted. He then signed a contract to play in the NBA Development League (D-League) and became eligible for the 2008 D-League draft. On November 7, 2008, Jeffers was selected 47th overall in the third round by the Iowa Energy. On February 11, 2009, after playing 24 games while averaging 19.9 points and 8.9 rebounds with the Energy, Jeffers was selected to the D-League All-Star Game roster. In the game, he scored 14 points as his team, the Red Team, defeated the Blue Team 113–103. He also participated in the D-League Dream Factory Friday Night Slam Dunk Contest, but was eliminated in the first round. He averaged 20.6 points on 53.5 percent shooting, 8.8 rebounds and 2.7 assists per game in 48 games and was named as the Rookie of the Year for the 2008–09 season. He played one game in the D-League playoffs as the Energy was eliminated in the first round by the Dakota Wizards

=== NGC Cantù (2009) ===
During the offseason, he was selected to play with the NBA D-League Select Team in the NBA Summer League. He played in two games, averaging 20.5 points and 7.0 rebounds in 23.0 minutes per game. After failing to earn a spot in the NBA teams' training camp, he opted to play overseas with the NGC Cantù in Italy. He left Cantù in December 2009 after only playing in 10 games while averaging 9.3 points and 5.7 rebounds per game.

=== Second stint with Iowa Energy (2010) ===
Jeffers returned to the D-League and rejoined the Iowa Energy on January 9, 2010.

=== Utah Jazz (2010) ===
On March 3, 2010, Jeffers was signed to a 10-day contract by the Utah Jazz. Prior to the call-up, he was averaging 14.3 points and 6.8 rebounds per game in 22 games with the Energy. He made his first NBA appearance on March 6, 2010, in a game against the Los Angeles Clippers. He then signed a second 10-day contract on March 14, 2010. After playing in seven games for the Jazz, he was signed for the remainder of the season on March 24, 2010. He played 10 games with the Jazz, averaging 2.6 points and 1.4 rebounds per game in 5.1 minutes per game. He also played 6 games in the playoffs.

=== Third stint with Iowa Energy (2010–11) ===
Jeffers remained on the Jazz roster throughout the 2010 NBA Summer League, the training camp and the preseason games. In the Summer League, he played in five games and averaged 7.6 points and 3.6 rebounds in 19.2 minutes per game. He then played in five preseason games, averaging 6.4 points and 2.4 rebounds in 8.6 minutes per game. However, he was waived before the start of the season. He then returned to the Iowa Energy for the 2010–11 season. On February 3, 2011, Jeffers, who was leading the league in scoring with 21.1 points per game, received his second selection to the D-League All-Star Game. In the game, he scored 14 points as his team, the Eastern Conference All-Stars, defeated the Western Conference All-Stars 115–108.

=== San Antonio Spurs (2011) ===
After playing in 37 games and averaging 21.2 points on 48.0 percent shooting, 9.0 rebounds and 3.1 assists per game, Jeffers was called up to the San Antonio Spurs. He signed a 10-day contract with them on March 4, 2011. He played only one game with the Spurs before he returned to the Energy on March 13.

=== Washington Wizards (2011) ===
Jeffers played one more game with the Energy before he was signed by the Washington Wizards on March 17, 2011. He signed his second 10-day contracts with the Wizards on March 27, 2011. On April 6, 2011, he was finally signed for the remainder of the season. He scored 15 points, in a game against the Miami Heat on March 20, 2011, his first double-figure scoring game in the NBA. Two days later, he started his first NBA game in a game against the Cleveland Cavaliers. He recorded his first double-double with 13 points and 11 rebounds on April 9, 2011. He played 16 games with the Wizards, averaging 5.7 points and 4.1 rebounds per game in 13.0 minutes per game. Although he ended the season with the Wizards in the NBA, Jeffers was named to the All NBA D-League Second Team and the NBA D-League All-Defensive First Team.

After the 2010–11 season, Jeffers became a restricted free agent as the Wizards extended a qualifying offer to him. However, the 2011 NBA lockout prevented him from signing the qualifying offer. He also suffered a torn anterior cruciate ligament in his right knee during a workout in July and was ruled out for six to eight months. The Wizards subsequently withdrew the qualifying offer, thus making him an unrestricted free agent. Jeffers went on to miss the entire 2011–12 season.

=== Fourth stint with Iowa Energy (2012–14) ===
In September 2012, Jeffers was invited to the Phoenix Suns' training camp and preseason games. He played in one preseason game before he was waived by the Suns before the 2012–13 regular season started.

He returned to the D-League and rejoined the Iowa Energy. He averaged 14.7 points on 48.6 percent shooting, 5.4 rebounds and 3.7 assists per game in 33 games. At the end of the season, Jeffers was named to the NBA D-League All-Defensive Third Team.

Jeffers joined the Minnesota Timberwolves for the 2013 NBA Summer League. He played in six games, averaging 8.2 points and 3.8 rebounds in 15.5 minutes per game. On September 26, 2013, he signed with the Timberwolves for training camp. He was later waived by the Timberwolves on October 25.

In November 2013, he was re-acquired by the Iowa Energy. On January 24, 2014, he signed a 10-day contract with the San Antonio Spurs. On February 1, 2014, he was waived by the Spurs.

On February 3, 2014, Jeffers was named to the Prospects All-Star roster for the 2014 NBA D-League All-Star Game. On February 6, 2014, he re-joined the Iowa Energy.

=== Minnesota Timberwolves (2014) ===
On April 8, 2014, Jeffers signed with the Minnesota Timberwolves for the rest of the 2013–14 season.

On April 24, 2014, Jeffers and Ron Howard were named the co-MVPs of the NBA D-League for the 2013–14 season.

=== Talk 'N Text Tropang Texters (2014) ===
On May 4, 2014, he signed with the Talk 'N Text Tropang Texters for the 2014 PBA Governors’ Cup. He made his one and only appearance for Talk 'N Text on May 21 as he recorded 38 points, 13 rebounds and 2 steals in the 105–99 win over Meralco Bolts.

Jeffers did not play in the 2014–15 basketball season reportedly because of a knee injury he suffered.

=== Barangay Ginebra San Miguel (2016) ===
On January 4, 2016, he signed with the Barangay Ginebra San Miguel for the 2016 PBA Commissioner's Cup and also for the 2016 Governors' Cup.

== Post-playing career ==
On December 22, 2016, it was announced that Jeffers would return to Robert Morris University of the National Association of Intercollegiate Athletics (NAIA) and served as associate head coach. He accumulated a 9–19 record during his first season as head coach in 2017–18.

== Career statistics ==
Legend
GP	Games played	GS	Games started	MPG	Minutes per game
FG%	Field goal percentage	3P%	3-point field goal percentage	FT%	Free throw percentage
RPG	Rebounds per game	APG	Assists per game	SPG	Steals per game
BPG	Blocks per game	PPG	Points per game	**Bold**	Career high

=== College ===
Year	Team	GP	GS	MPG	FG%	3P%	FT%	RPG	APG	SPG	BPG	PPG
2005–06	Illinois-Chicago	31	30	32.3	.488	.000	.530	7.6	3.0	1.0	.6	11.6
2006–07	Illinois-Chicago	32	32	**33.0**	.469	.167	.665	8.6	2.6	1.7	.2	15.4
2007–08	Robert Morris (Illinois)	**33**		29.5	**.602**		**.682**	**8.8**	**3.3**			**21.5**
**Career**		96		31.6	.528		.636	8.4	2.9			16.3

=== NBA ===
==== Regular season ====
Year	Team	GP	GS	MPG	FG%	3P%	FT%	RPG	APG	SPG	BPG	PPG
2009–10	Utah	14	0	5.2	.414	.000	**.684**	1.4	.1	.3	.0	2.6
2010–11	San Antonio	1	0	8.0	.333	.000	.000	2.0	1.0	.0	.0	2.0
2010–11	Washington	**16**	**1**	**19.6**	.484	**.250**	.652	**4.1**	**1.2**	**1.1**	.0	**5.7**
2013–14	San Antonio	4	**1**	8.5	**.600**	.000	.500	1.5	.3	.0	.0	1.8
**Career**		35	2	12.3	.465	.200	.657	2.6	.6	.6	.0	3.9

==== Playoffs ====
Year	Team	GP	GS	MPG	FG%	3P%	FT%	RPG	APG	SPG	BPG	PPG
2010	Utah	6	0	1.7	.167	.000	.000	.2	.0	.0	.0	.3
**Career**		6	0	1.7	.167	.000	.000	.2	.0	.0	.0	.3

=== D-League ===
==== Regular season ====
Year	Team	GP	GS	MPG	FG%	3P%	FT%	RPG	APG	SPG	BPG	PPG
2008–09	Iowa	**48**	32	37.1	**.535**	.286	.738	8.8	2.7	**2.0**	**.4**	20.6
2009–10	Iowa	22	16	29.2	.510	.167	.663	6.8	1.9	1.8	.3	14.3
2010–11	Iowa	38	**37**	**38.2**	.482	.311	.731	**9.1**	3.1	1.9	.2	**21.1**
2012–13	Iowa	33	31	32.9	.486	**.348**	**.741**	5.4	**3.7**	1.7	.1	14.7
**Career**		141	116	35.2	.506	.311	.729	7.8	2.9	1.9	.3	18.4

==== Playoffs ====
Year	Team	GP	GS	MPG	FG%	3P%	FT%	RPG	APG	SPG	BPG	PPG
2009	Iowa	**1**	**1**	**43.0**	**.722**	.000	**.714**	**14.0**	**4.0**	**1.0**	**2.0**	**31.0**
**Career**		1	1	43.0	.722	.000	.714	14.0	4.0	1.0	2.0	31.0
