= Marcus Cousin =

American basketball player (born 1986)

Personal information
- Born: December 18, 1986 (age 39) Baltimore, Maryland, U.S.
- Listed height: 6 ft 11 in (2.11 m)
- Listed weight: 255 lb (116 kg)

Career information
- High school: Randallstown (Randallstown, Maryland)
- College: Seton Hall (2004–2006); Houston (2007–2009)
- NBA draft: 2009: undrafted
- Playing career: 2009–2019
- Position: Center
- Number: 50

Career history
- 2009–2010: Mersin Büyükşehir Belediyesi
- 2010: Hapoel Gilboa Galil
- 2010–2011: Austin Toros
- 2011: Utah Jazz
- 2011: Rio Grande Valley Vipers
- 2012: Guaiqueríes de Margarita
- 2012: Caneros de La Romana
- 2012–2013: Kyoto Hannaryz
- 2013–2015: Krasny Oktyabr Volgograd
- 2015: Caciques de Humacao
- 2015: Blackwater Elite
- 2015–2016: Shinshu Brave Warriors
- 2017: Gunma Crane Thunders
- 2018: Sendai 89ers
- 2018–2019: Iwate Big Bulls

Career highlights
- NBA D-League All-Star (2011); All-NBA D-League Second Team (2011); NBA D-League All-Defensive Second Team (2011); Ligat HaAl champion (2010)
- Stats at NBA.com
- Stats at Basketball Reference

Marcus Lynn Cousin Jr. (pronounced coo-ZON; born December 18, 1986) is an American former professional basketball player. He played college basketball for Seton Hall University and the University of Houston.

== High school career ==
Cousin attended Randallstown High School in Randallstown, Maryland. During his junior season, he averaged 14 points and 7 rebounds per game. He also participated in the Charm City Classic All-Star game. During his senior season, he averaged 11 points, 7 rebounds and 4 blocks per game before sitting out the final two months with an ankle injury. Michigan State, Nebraska, USC and Massachusetts were all interested in Cousin, but he eventually decided to sign with Seton Hall.

== College career ==
In his freshman season at Seton Hall, Cousin played sparingly. In 18 games (no starts), he averaged 0.4 points and 1.1 rebounds in 6 minutes per game.

In his sophomore season, he helped the Pirates to an 18–12 record and a berth in the NCAA Tournament against Wichita State. In 26 games (13 starts), he averaged 2.1 points and 3.5 rebounds in 13.1 minutes per game.

In 2006, he transferred to the University of Houston. Due to NCAA transfer rules, he was forced to sit out the 2006–07 season.

In his redshirted junior season at Houston, he finished third on the team in blocks with 22. In 29 games (no starts), he averaged 4.4 points and 4.0 rebounds in 13.8 minutes per game.

In his senior season, he had his best year of college basketball. In 33 games (32 starts), he averaged 10.9 points, 8.4 rebounds and 2.1 blocks in 30 minutes per game.

== Professional career ==
=== 2009–10 season ===
After going undrafted in the 2009 NBA draft, Cousin joined the Houston Rockets for the 2009 NBA Summer League. He later signed with Mersin Büyükşehir Belediyesi in Turkey for the 2009–10 season. In January 2010, he left Turkey and signed with Hapoel Gilboa Galil in Israel for the rest of the season.

=== 2010–11 season ===
On September 27, 2010, Cousin signed with the San Antonio Spurs. However, he was later waived by the Spurs on October 22, 2010. On October 30, 2010, he was acquired by the Austin Toros as an affiliate player.

On March 9, 2011, he signed a 10-day contract with the Utah Jazz. On March 19, 2011, he returned to the Toros. On April 11, 2011, he signed with the Houston Rockets for the rest of the season and was immediately assigned to the Rio Grande Valley Vipers. On May 1, 2011, he returned to the Rockets following the conclusion of the NBA D-League season. On December 24, 2011, he was waived by the Rockets before the start of the 2011–12 NBA season. He did not appear in a game for the Rockets during his tenure.

=== 2012 off-season ===
In March 2012, Cousin signed with Guaiqueríes de Margarita of the Liga Profesional de Baloncesto in Venezuela for the 2012 LPB season. However, he left after one game. In July 2012, he joined the NBA D-League Select Team for the 2012 NBA Summer League. In August 2012, he signed with Caneros de La Romana in the Dominican Republic for a short stint.

=== 2012–13 season ===
In September 2012, Cousin signed with Kyoto Hannaryz of the bj league for the 2012–13 season. In 57 games, he averaged 14.5 points and 9.7 rebounds per game.

=== 2013–14 season ===
On September 30, 2013, Cousin signed with the San Antonio Spurs. However, he was later waived by the Spurs on October 15, 2013. On November 27, 2013, he signed with Krasny Oktyabr Volgograd of Russia for the rest of the 2013–14 season.

=== 2014–15 season ===
On August 17, 2014, Cousin re-signed with Krasny Oktyabr on a one-year deal. On March 1, 2015, he parted ways with Krasny Oktyabr.

On April 5, 2015, he signed with Caciques de Humacao of the Puerto Rican Baloncesto Superior Nacional. He left Humacao later that month after appearing in eight games for the club. On June 4, he signed with the Blackwater Elite of the Philippine Basketball Association for the rest of the 2015 PBA Governors' Cup as a replacement for Marcus Douthit.

=== 2015–16 season ===
In September 2015, Cousin signed with the Shinshu Brave Warriors for the 2015–16 bj league season. He left the team in January 2016 after appearing in 12 games.

=== 2016–17 season ===
In October 2016, Cousin signed with Sagesse of the Lebanese Basketball League. He left before playing in a game for them. In January 2017, he joined Japanese team Gunma Crane Thunders. In 30 games, he averaged 10.6 points, 8.4 rebounds and 1.2 assists per game.

=== 2017–18 season ===
On January 17, 2018, Cousin signed with Sendai 89ers, returning to Japan for a fourth stint.

=== 2018–19 season ===
In December 2018, Cousin joined the Iwate Big Bulls, returning to Japan for a fifth stint.

== NBA career statistics ==
Legend
GP	Games played	GS	Games started	MPG	Minutes per game
FG%	Field goal percentage	3P%	3-point field goal percentage	FT%	Free throw percentage
RPG	Rebounds per game	APG	Assists per game	SPG	Steals per game
BPG	Blocks per game	PPG	Points per game	**Bold**	Career high

=== Regular season ===
Year	Team	GP	GS	MPG	FG%	3P%	FT%	RPG	APG	SPG	BPG	PPG
2010–11	Utah	4	0	4.5	.667	.000	.000	.8	.0	.0	.3	1.0
Career		4	0	4.5	.667	.000	.000	.8	.0	.0	.3	1.0
