= Curtis Stinson =

American basketball player

Personal information
- Born: February 15, 1983 (age 43) Bronx, New York, U.S.
- Listed height: 6 ft 3 in (1.91 m)
- Listed weight: 215 lb (98 kg)

Career information
- High school: Winchendon Prep (Winchendon, Massachusetts)
- College: Iowa State (2003–2006)
- NBA draft: 2006: undrafted
- Playing career: 2006–2016
- Position: Point guard

Career history
- 2006: Split
- 2007: Dakota Wizards
- 2007: Fort Worth Flyers
- 2007–2008: Kolossos Rodou
- 2008: Utah Flash
- 2008: Austin Toros
- 2008–2011: Iowa Energy
- 2011: Barangay Ginebra Kings
- 2011: Krka
- 2012: Iowa Energy
- 2012: Marinos de Anzoátegui
- 2012: Caneros de La Romana
- 2012–2013: Halcones Rojos de Veracruz
- 2013: Caneros de La Romana
- 2014: Iowa Energy
- 2014: Gigantes de Guayana
- 2016: Venados de Mazatlán

Career highlights
- NBA D-League champion (2011); NBA D-League Most Valuable Player (2011); 2× NBA D-League All-Star (2010, 2011); 2× All-NBA D-League First Team (2010, 2011); No. 10 retired by Iowa Energy

Curtis Stinson (born February 15, 1983) is an American former professional basketball player. He played college basketball at Iowa State University.

== College career ==
Stinson is a former Iowa State Cyclones college basketball player. In his three years as a starter at ISU, he led the team to the NIT Final Four and the 2nd round of the NCAA Tournament. At Iowa State, Stinson was best friends and roommates with Will Blalock. After his junior year, Stinson declared for the NBA draft, thereby forgoing his senior year.

== Professional career ==
=== 2006–07 season ===
After going undrafted in the 2006 NBA draft, Stinson joined the Golden State Warriors for the 2006 NBA Summer League. He later signed with KK Split of Croatia for the 2006–07 season. In November 2006, he left Split after 6 games.

On January 19, 2007, he was acquired by the Dakota Wizards. On February 28, 2007, he was waived by the Wizards. On March 5, 2007, he was acquired by the Fort Worth Flyers.

=== 2007–08 season ===
Stinson joined the New Jersey Nets for the 2007 NBA Summer League. On September 5, 2007, his rights were acquired by the Utah Flash in the 2007 NBA D-League expansion draft. However, he later signed with Kolossos Rodou of Greece for the 2007–08 season. In January 2008, he was released by Kolossos after 11 games.

On February 1, 2008, he was acquired by the Utah Flash. On March 4, 2008, he was waived by the Flash. On March 6, he was acquired by the Austin Toros. On March 23, he was traded to the Iowa Energy.

=== 2008–09 season ===
Stinson joined the Los Angeles Clippers for the 2008 NBA Summer League. In November 2008, he was re-acquired by the Iowa Energy.

=== 2009–10 season ===
Stinson joined the NBA D-League Select Team for the 2009 NBA Summer League. On July 27, 2009, he signed with Aris Thessaloniki of Greece. However, he was released by the club on August 19, 2009, before appearing in a game for them.

On September 26, 2009, he signed with the Chicago Bulls. However, he was waived by the Bulls on October 2, 2009. In November 2009, he was re-acquired by the Iowa Energy.

=== 2010–11 season ===
Stinson joined the Orlando Magic for the Orlando Summer League and the Toronto Raptors for the Las Vegas Summer League. In November 2010, he was again re-acquired by the Iowa Energy. Stinson went on to win the 2011 NBA D-League MVP award while also helping the Energy win the NBA D-League championship.

In May 2011, Stinson joined the Barangay Ginebra Kings of the Philippine Basketball Association. He played in four games for the team before suffering an injury during a game against the Talk 'N Text Tropang Texters in Dubai.

=== 2011–12 season ===
In August 2011, Stinson signed with BC Krka of Slovenia for the 2011–12 season. In November 2011, he left Krka due to injury.

On January 9, 2012, he was re-acquired by the Iowa Energy.

On April 30, 2012, he joined Marinos de Anzoátegui for the 2012 LPB season. He left after 4 games. He then joined Caneros de La Romana of the Dominican Republic for a short stint.

=== 2012–13 season ===
On September 15, 2012, Stinson signed with KK Cedevita of Croatia. However, he left Cedevita on September 28 after being replaced by Vlado Ilievski.

In December 2012, he signed with Halcones Rojos de Veracruz of Mexico for the rest of the 2012–13 season.

In May 2013, he joined Brujos de Guayama for the 2013 BSN season, but left before appearing in a game for them. He then re-joined Caneros de La Romana for another short stint.

=== 2013–14 season ===
On January 23, 2014, he was re-acquired by the Iowa Energy. In April 2014, he signed with Gigantes de Guayana of Venezuela.

In 2016, Stinson played for the Mazatlan (MX) Nauticos of the Pacific Coast Basketball League.
