= Dignity Health Event Center =

Multipurpose arena in Bakersfield, California

Coordinates: 35°25′11″N 119°02′59″W

- Interactive map of Dignity Health Event Center
- Former names: Jam Events Center (2009-2012)
- Location: 1400 Norris Road; Bakersfield, California 93308
- Capacity: Basketball: 500

Construction
- Opened: 2009

Tenant
- Bakersfield Jam (NBA D-League) (2009–2016)

The Dignity Health Event Center is a multipurpose arena in Bakersfield, California. It opened in December 2009 as the Jam Events Center. It was home to the Bakersfield Jam of the NBA Development League.

The arena regularly seats 500 people but it is expandable to 700. Jam owner Stan Ellis estimated in 2010 that the team is saving $500,000 a season by using the smaller facility rather than the much larger Rabobank Arena for home games. Because of the small seating capacity, no single-game tickets are available for any contest. This was also the team's practice facility.

On August 21, 2012, it was announced that Dignity Health had signed a three-year naming rights deal with the Jam, changing the name to the Dignity Health Event Center effective immediately.
