= Brad Jones (basketball) =

American basketball player & coach (born c.1969)

Milwaukee Bucks
- Position: Assistant coach
- League: NBA

Personal information
- Born: Pittsburgh, Pennsylvania, U.S.

Career information
- College: Lambuth (1986–1990)
- NBA draft: 1990: undrafted
- Coaching career: 1990–present

Career history

Coaching
- 1990–1996: Lambuth (assistant)
- 1996–2001: Lambuth
- 2001–2007: Utah Jazz (scout)
- 2007–2010: Utah Flash
- 2010–2012: Austin Toros
- 2012–2016: Utah Jazz (assistant)
- 2016–2018: Iowa Wolves (scout)
- 2018–2019: Memphis Hustle
- 2019–2023: Memphis Grizzlies (assistant)
- 2026–present: Milwaukee Bucks (assistant)

Career highlights
- As head coach: 2× Mid-South Coach of the Year (1998, 1999); NBA D-League champion (2012)

Brad Jones (born c. 1969) is an American basketball coach, who is an assistant coach for the Milwaukee Bucks of the National Basketball Association (NBA).

== Early life ==
After graduating, he went on to play basketball at Lambuth University, where he was a part of the championship teams.

== Coaching career ==
In 1995, after serving as an assistant coach he became the head coach at Lambuth University until 2001. In 2001, he joined the Utah Jazz organization as a scout and in 2007 became the head coach of the Utah Flash. In July 2010, his contract was not renewed.

In September 2010, Jones was named head coach of the Austin Toros. He led the team to the 2012 D League championship. After the season, Jones left the team.

In July 2013, Jones was promoted by the Utah Jazz to full assistant coach after returning to the team the prior season as the assistant coach/player development.

He then served as the general manager of the Iowa Wolves and professional scout of the Minnesota Timberwolves.

On August 22, 2018, the Memphis Grizzlies hired Jones as the Memphis Hustle's head coach for their development team's second season. The following season, he was moved the Grizzlies' staff as an assistant coach.

On August 7, 2026, Jones was hired to serve as an assistant coach for the Milwaukee Bucks under head coach Taylor Jenkins.
