= Iowa Wolves =

American minor league basketball team

- Conference: Western
- League: NBA G League
- Founded: 2007
- History: Iowa Energy; 2007–2017; Iowa Wolves; 2017–present
- Arena: Casey's Center
- Location: Des Moines, Iowa
- Team colors: Blue, green, gray, black, white
- Head coach: Mahmoud Abdelfattah
- Ownership: Minnesota Timberwolves
- Affiliation: Minnesota Timberwolves
- Championships: 1 (2011)
- Conference titles: 1 (2011)
- Division titles: 4 (2009, 2010, 2011, 2014)
- Website: iowa.gleague.nba.com

The Iowa Wolves are an American professional basketball team in the NBA G League based in Des Moines, Iowa. They are affiliated with the Minnesota Timberwolves, and play their home games at the Casey's Center. From 2007 to 2017, the team was known as the Iowa Energy in the NBA Development League (D-League) until being purchased and renamed by the Timberwolves. They broke the D-league attendance record on their first home game with 8,842 fans. They later set the record again in game two of the 2011 D-League Finals with an attendance of 14,036 fans. They won the 2011 D-League Finals, defeating the Rio Grande Valley Vipers two-games-to-one.

== History ==
=== Formation ===
On February 27, 2007, the D-League awarded an expansion team to Des Moines, Iowa, as one of the four expansion teams for the 2007–08 season. The team was owned and operated by Iowa Basketball, LLC, a local ownership group led by attorney Jerry Crawford and also including Gary Kirke, Sheldon Ohringer, Paul Drey, Michael Richards and Bruce Rastetter. The team would play their home games at the Casey's Center, parts of the Iowa Events Center. The team later hired former Northern Iowa player Nick Nurse as the team's first head coach.

The team initially held a naming contest for the team. The choices listed on their website were Corncobs, Maize, River Rats, Scarecrows, and Thoroughbreds. However, on June 29, 2007, the owners announced the name Iowa Energy, along with team colors and logos. The team logo was an orange basketball above the word "energy" and the team colors are purple, orange and red. Two NBA teams, the Chicago Bulls and the Miami Heat, were announced as the team's NBA affiliates.

=== Iowa Energy (2007–2017) ===
==== 2007–2010 ====
The Energy began to construct their roster by participating in the 2007 D-League expansion draft on September 5, 2007, and the 2007 D-League Draft on November 1, 2007. On November 23, 2007, the Energy played their first game in the D-League. They defeated the defending champion Dakota Wizards 101–99 to record the team's first win. Their inaugural home game at the Wells Fargo Arena was played on November 26, 2007. The Energy defeated the Albuquerque Thunderbirds 101–98 in front of a league-record attendance of 8,842. The Energy finished the season third in the Central Division with 22 wins and 28 losses. The record was only the tenth best record in the league and therefore the Energy failed to qualify for the playoffs.

Before the 2008–09 season, the league announced that the Energy would be affiliated with the Bulls and the Phoenix Suns. The Suns, who was previously affiliated with the Albuquerque Thunderbirds, replaced the Heat, which would be affiliated with the Thunderbirds. The Energy improved their performance and finished the season with the best record in the Central Division with 28 wins and 22 losses. They were seeded third for the playoffs and were paired with the Dakota Wizards in the First Round. However, they were defeated by the Wizards at home with a 109–114 loss.

Energy center Courtney Sims, who averaged 22.8 points and 11.0 rebounds per game, won the D-League Most Valuable Player Award. He also earned multiple call-ups to the NBA, signing a pair of 10-day contracts with the Phoenix Suns and the New York Knicks. Guard Othyus Jeffers, who was selected in the third round of the 2008 D-League Draft by the Energy, was named as the Rookie of the Year Award. Sims was named in the All-NBA D-League First Team while Energy first-round draftee Cartier Martin was named in the All-NBA D-League Third Team. Both Sims and Martin received call-ups to the NBA and were forced to miss the Energy's playoff games.

The Energy were reassigned to the Eastern Conference for the 2009–10 season as the league realigned itself to two conferences. Despite losing former MVP Courtney Sims to overseas, the Energy improved their regular season record. They won the Eastern Conference with 37 wins, which was also the best record in the league. As one of the top three seeds, the Energy had the rights to choose their opponents in the first round of the playoffs. They chose to face the seventh seed Utah Flash of the Western Conference. They lost the first game of the series before they bounced back with two straight wins to advance to the semifinals. In the semifinals, the Energy faced the eighth seed Tulsa 66ers, who eliminated the Sioux Falls Skyforce in the first round. The Energy defeated the 66ers 107–102 in the first game at Tulsa. However, the 66ers won the second game at Des Moines to even the series. In the decisive Game 3, the Energy lost 122–127 at home and were eliminated from the playoffs.

==== 2011 championship season ====
Courtney Sims, Othyus Jeffers and Curtis Stinson all returned to the Energy roster for the 2010–11 season. The team also retained Nick Nurse as head coach after he briefly accepted a coaching position at Iowa State. The Energy matched their previous season performance by recording 37 wins and clinched the first seed again. The Energy once again had the rights to choose their opponents in the first round of the playoffs. They chose seventh seed Utah Flash, who were defeated by the Energy in the first round of last year's playoffs. The Energy and the Flash each won one road game each before the Energy won the decisive Game 3 at home to advance to the semifinal. In the semifinals, the Energy faced the Tulsa 66ers who eliminated them in last year's playoffs. The Energy recorded two straight wins and won the series 2–0 to advance to the D-League Finals.

The Energy faced the third seed Rio Grande Valley Vipers, who defeated the second seed Reno Bighorns in the semifinals. The Energy, led by Curtis Stinson's triple-double, won the first game 123–106 at Hidalgo. Stinson scored 29 points along with 10 rebounds and 10 assists, while five other Energy players scored in double figures. The Vipers won the second game 141–122 despite Stinson's second straight triple-double. That second game at the Casey’s Center was attended by a new league-record attendance of 14,036 fans. In the decisive Game 3, Stinson suffered an injury that limited his playing time. The Energy trailed the Vipers by seven points after three quarters, but managed to outscore the Vipers 38–23 in the fourth quarter to clinch the D-League championship. Guard Stefhon Hannah led the Energy with 31 points, while five other Energy players scored in double figures.

Stinson, who averaged 19.3 points, 9.8 assists and 5.7 rebounds per game, was named as the D-League Most Valuable Player Award. Stinson and former Rookie of the Year Othyus Jeffers were named in the All-NBA D-League Team. Two Energy stars, Jeffers and former MVP Courtney Sims, both missed the Energy's playoff games. Jeffers received a call-up to the Washington Wizards and signed a contract for the remainder of the season, while Sims left the team to play in China.

==== 2011–2014 ====
Before the 2011–12 season, the league announced that the Energy would be affiliated with three teams, the Bulls, the New Orleans Hornets and the Washington Wizards. The Energy ended their three years affiliation with the Suns as the Bakersfield Jam was announced to be the Suns' new affiliate. On July 15, 2011, head coach Nick Nurse left the Energy and was hired by the Rio Grande Valley Vipers to be their new head coach. The Energy later named former Utah Flash head coach Kevin Young as the team's new head coach.

For the 2012–13 season, Energy added the Denver Nuggets as an affiliate in addition to the existing affiliations with the Bulls, Hornets, and Wizards. Young was fired in January 2013, replaced by Bruce Wilson on an interim basis.

The Minnesota Timberwolves were added as an affiliate for the 2013–14 season, while Nate Bjorkgren as the franchise's new head coach. Led by Othyus Jeffers, who was co-Most Valuable Player of the season along with Ron Howard, the Energy won its second Central Division title and fourth Division/Conference title overall, but fell to the Fort Wayne Mad Ants in the playoffs.

==== 2014–2017 ====
The Energy used this logo from 2014 to 2017

Following the 2014 season, the Energy announced that they would be entering a hybrid single affiliation deal with the Memphis Grizzlies. The team's color scheme shifted towards that of the Grizzlies. Jed Kaplan, a minority owner of the Memphis Grizzlies, led the new affiliation deal and was named managing partner for the Energy ownership group. The agreement ended at the conclusion of the 2016–17 season as the Grizzlies began operating their own D-League team, the Memphis Hustle.

=== Iowa Wolves (2017–present) ===
On January 23, 2017, it was announced that the Minnesota Timberwolves would be purchasing the Energy to serve as their D-League affiliate beginning with the 2017–18 season and was finalized on May 3, 2017. On May 30, the team announced it had rebranded to the Iowa Wolves. The affiliation between the Timberwolves and the Wolves is the second between the Twin Cities and Des Moines as the Minnesota Wild of the National Hockey League and the Iowa Wild of the American Hockey League also share an affiliation.

== Season results ==
Season	Division / Conference	Finish	Wins	Losses	Win%	Playoffs
Iowa Energy
2007–08	Central	3rd	22	28	.440	
2008–09	Central	1st	28	22	.560	Lost First Round to Dakota Wizards, 109–114
2009–10	Eastern	1st	37	13	.740	Won First Round vs. Utah Flash, 2–1; Lost Semifinals to Tulsa 66ers, 1–2
2010–11	Eastern	1st	37	13	.740	Won First Round vs. Utah Flash, 2–1; Won Semifinals vs. Tulsa 66ers, 2–0; Won D-League Finals vs. Rio Grande Valley Vipers, 2–1
2011–12	Eastern	5th	25	25	.500	Lost First Round to Los Angeles D-Fenders, 0–2
2012–13	Central	6th	14	36	.280	
2013–14	Central	1st	31	19	.620	Lost First Round to Rio Grande Valley Vipers, 1–2
2014–15	Central	3rd	26	24	.520	
2015–16	Central	3rd	26	24	.520	
2016–17	Southwest	6th	12	38	.240	
Iowa Wolves
2017–18	Midwest	3rd	24	26	.480	
2018–19	Midwest	4th	20	30	.400	
2019–20	Midwest	4th	19	24	.442	Season cancelled by COVID-19 pandemic
2020–21	—	18th	2	13	.133	
2021–22	Western	7th	15	17	.469	
2022–23	Western	13th	9	23	.281	
2023–24	Western	14th	7	27	.206	
2024–25	Western	15th	7	27	.206	
2025–26	Western	6th	21	15	.583	Lost First Round to Stockton Kings, 104–116
Regular season			382	444	.462	
Playoffs			10	11	.476	

== Tip-Off Tournament ==
Season	Division	Finish	Wins	Losses	Win%	Showcase Cup Playoffs	
Season	Division	Finish	Wins	Losses	Win%	Result	Score
Iowa Wolves
2021	Central	5th	6	6	.500	Did not qualify	
2022	Central	4th	11	7	.611	Did not qualify	
2023	Central	5th	6	10	.375	Did not qualify	
2024	Central	1st	12	4	.750	Won quarterfinals (Stockton Kings; Lost semifinals (Sioux Falls Skyforce	124–99; 104–117
2025	Central	3rd	8	6	.571	Did not qualify	
Tip-Off Tournament			41	33	.554	2021–present	
Showcase Cup playoffs			1	1	.500	2021–present	
Totals			42	34	.514	2021–present	

== Players ==
=== Current roster ===
Iowa Wolves roster
Players

Pos.	No.	Player	Height	Weight	DOB	From
F	25	Enrique Freeman (TW)	6 ft 9 in (2.06 m)	220 lb (100 kg)	2000-07-29	Akron
G	13	Dajuan Harris Jr.	6 ft 2 in (1.88 m)	175 lb (79 kg)	2000-12-11	Kansas
G	15	Zyon Pullin (TW)	6 ft 4 in (1.93 m)	206 lb (93 kg)	2001-03-03	Florida
G	11	Eli Pemberton	6 ft 5 in (1.96 m)	195 lb (88 kg)	1997-05-31	Hofstra
F	1	Nate Santos	6 ft 7 in (2.01 m)	215 lb (98 kg)	2001-11-09	Dayton
SG	—	Stevie Thompson	6 ft 5 in (1.96 m)	190 lb (86 kg)	2026-03-23	Oregon
C	44	Rocco Zikarsky (TW)	7 ft 3 in (2.21 m)	227 lb (103 kg)	2006-07-11	Brisbane

Coaches
Head coach
- Ernest Scott
Assistant(s)
- Nate Bubes
- Michael DiBenedetto
- Kelly McCarty

Legend
- (DP) Unsigned draft pick
- (FA) Free agent
- (S) Suspended
- (P) Prospects
- (NBA) On assignment from NBA affiliate
- (TW) Two-way affiliate player
- Injured

Roster
Updated: March 7, 2026

=== Awards and honors ===
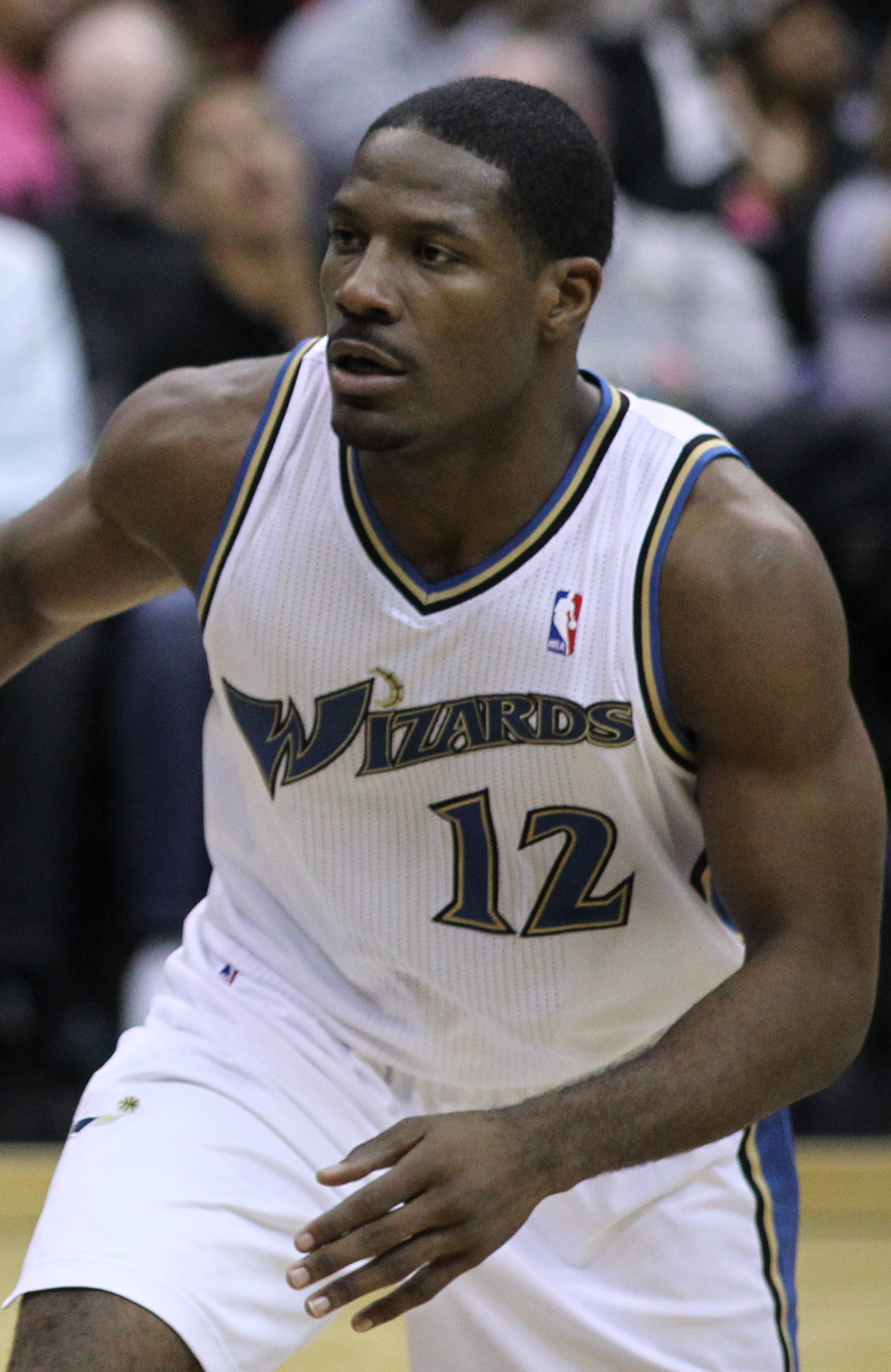
Othyus Jeffers won the Rookie of the Year Award in 2009 and received two All-Star Game selections during his career with the Energy.

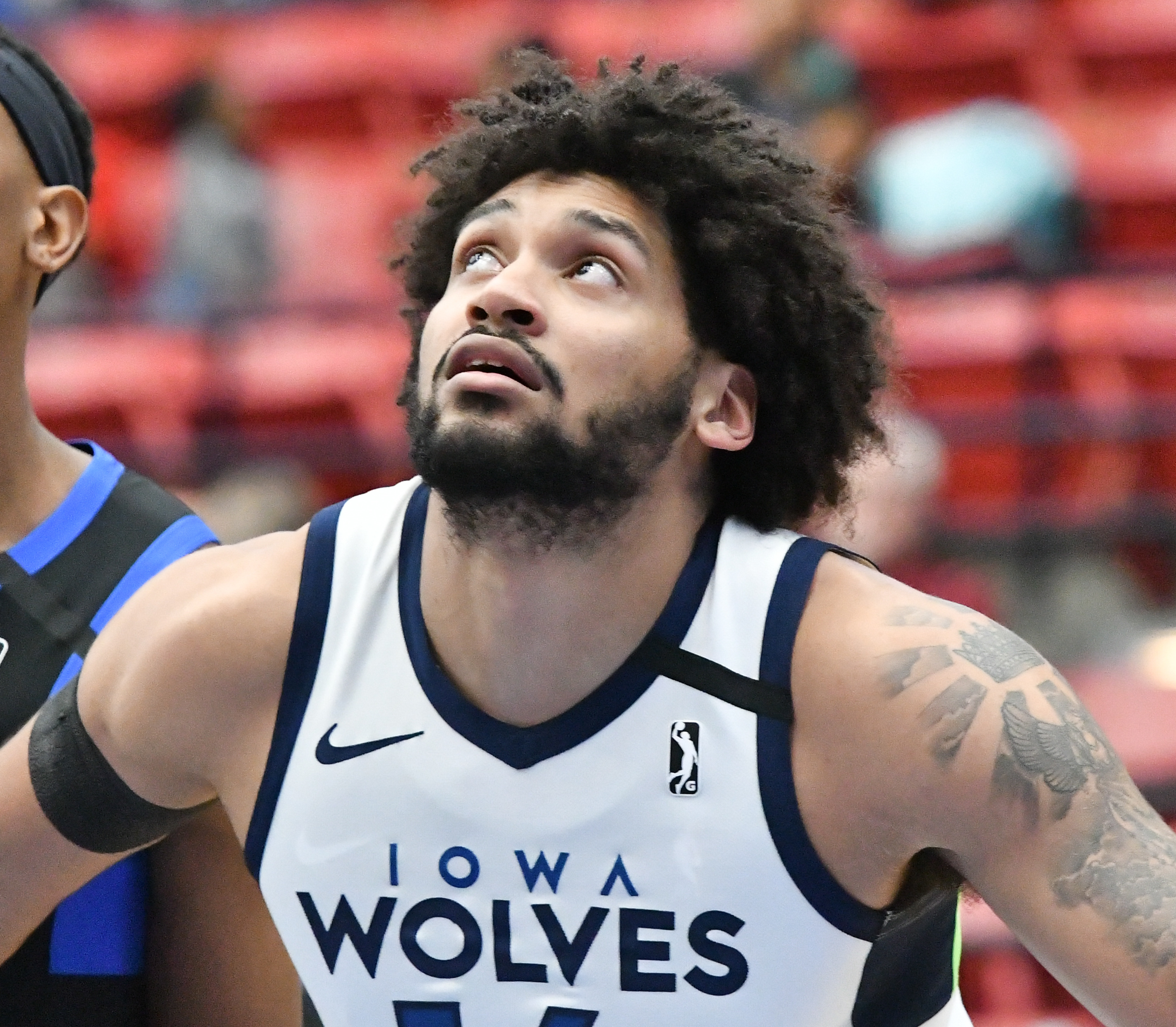
Jordan Murphy

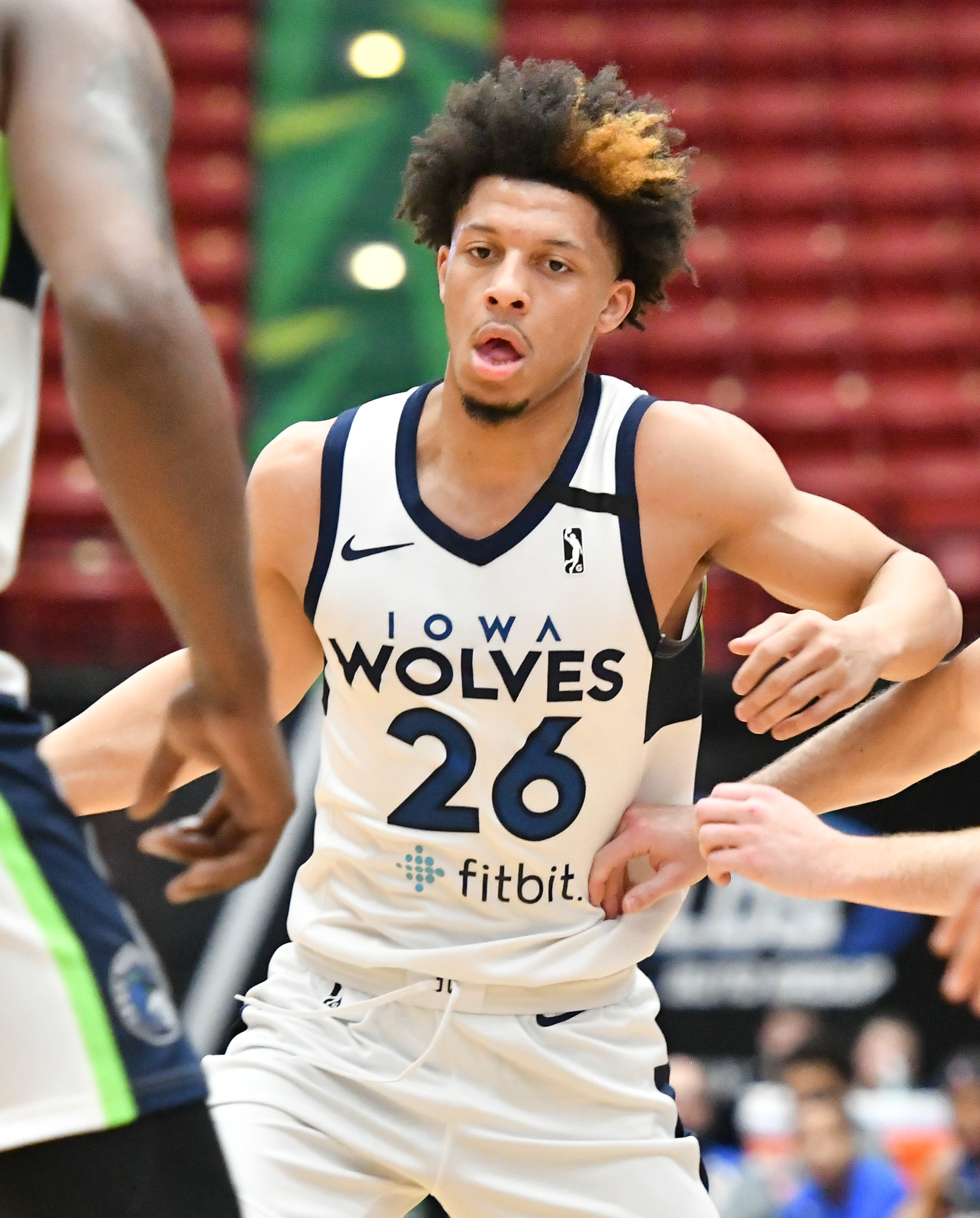
Lindell Wigginton

NBA D-League Most Valuable Player Award

- Courtney Sims (2009)
- Curtis Stinson (2011)
- Othyus Jeffers (co-) (2014)

NBA D-League Rookie of the Year Award

- Othyus Jeffers (2009)

All-NBA D-League First Team

- Cartier Martin (2010)
- Courtney Sims (2009)
- Curtis Stinson (2010, 2011)
- Othyus Jeffers (2014)
- Alex Stepheson (2016)

All-NBA D-League Second Team

- Othyus Jeffers (2011)

All-NBA D-League Third Team

- Earl Barron (2010)
- Cartier Martin (2009)
- Damien Wilkins (2015)

NBA D-League All-Star Game Most Valuable Player Award

- Courtney Sims (2009, 2011)

== Head coaches ==
#	Head coach	Term	Regular season				Playoffs				Achievements
#	Head coach	Term	G	W	L	Win%	G	W	L	Win%	Achievements
1	Nick Nurse	2007–2011	200	124	76	.620	15	9	6	.600	D-League Championship: 2011; Dennis Johnson Coach of the Year Award: 2011; NBA D-League All-Star Game coach: 2009, 2010, 2011
2	Kevin Young	2011–2013	73	31	42	.425	2	0	2	.000	NBA D-League All-Star Game coach: 2012
3	Bruce Wilson	2013	27	8	19	.296	—	—	—	—	
4	Nate Bjorkgren	2013–2014	50	31	19	.620	3	1	2	.333	
5	Bob Donewald, Jr.	2014–2016	100	52	48	.520	—	—	—	—	
6	Matt Woodley	2016–2017	21	2	19	.095	—	—	—	—	
7	Glynn Cyprien	2017	29	10	19	.344	—	—	—	—	
8	Scott Roth	2017–2019	100	44	56	.440	—	—	—	—	
9	Sam Newman-Beck	2019–2021	58	21	37	.362	—	—	—	—	
10	Jeff Newton	2021–2023	64	24	40	.375	—	—	—	—	
11	Ernest Scott	2023–2025	–	–	–	–	—	—	—	—	
12	Mahmoud Abdelfattah	2025–present	–	–	–	–	—	—	—	—	

== NBA affiliates ==
=== Iowa Energy ===
- Chicago Bulls (2007–2014)
- Denver Nuggets (2012–2014)
- Memphis Grizzlies (2014–2017)
- Miami Heat (2007–2008)
- Minnesota Timberwolves (2013–2014)
- New Orleans Hornets/Pelicans (2011–2014)
- Phoenix Suns (2008–2011)
- Washington Wizards (2011–2014)

=== Iowa Wolves ===
- Minnesota Timberwolves (2017–present)
