= 2011–12 NBA Development League season =

- League: NBA Development League
- Sport: Basketball
- Duration: November 25, 2011 – April 28, 2012
- Total attendance: 1,055,239
- TV partner(s): Versus/NBC Sports Network, NBA TV

Draft
- Top draft pick: Jamaal Tinsley
- Picked by: Los Angeles D-Fenders

Regular season
- Top seed: Los Angeles D-Fenders
- Season MVP: Justin Dentmon (Austin Toros)
- Top scorer: Blake Ahearn (Reno Bighorns)

Playoffs

Finals
- Champions: Austin Toros
- Runners-up: Los Angeles D-Fenders

NBA Development League seasons
- ← 2010–11 2012–13 →

The 2011–12 NBA Development League season was the 11th season of the NBA Development League (NBA D-League). The NBA D-League is the official minor league basketball organization owned and run by the National Basketball Association (NBA). The league was formed in 2001 as the National Basketball Development League (NBDL). The league adopted its current name in 2005 to reflect its close affiliation with the NBA. The 2011–12 season will be competed by 16 teams. The Los Angeles D-Fenders, after spending one season inactive, joined the 15 returning teams from the previous season. The Utah Flash ceased operation at the end of the previous season and would not be playing in the 2011–12 season. The New Mexico Thunderbirds relocated to Canton, Ohio and were renamed as the Canton Charge.

This season, an all-time high nine teams will have single-affiliation partnerships with NBA teams, up from four in the previous season. Five of them, the Austin Toros, the Canton Charge, the Dakota Wizards, the Los Angeles D-Fenders and the Tulsa 66ers, are owned by their NBA affiliates. Four teams, the Erie BayHawks, the Rio Grande Valley Vipers, the Springfield Armor and the Texas Legends, have a hybrid single-affiliation partnership with NBA teams, where their basketball operations are controlled by their NBA affiliates. The other seven teams are affiliated with three NBA teams each.

== Teams and coaches ==
Team	City	Arena	Head coach	NBA affiliate(s)
Eastern Conference
Canton Charge	Canton, Ohio	Canton Memorial Civic Center	Alex Jensen	Cleveland Cavaliers
Dakota Wizards	Bismarck, North Dakota	Bismarck Civic Center	Nate Bjorkgren	Golden State Warriors
Erie BayHawks	Erie, Pennsylvania	Tullio Arena	Jay Larranaga	New York Knicks
Fort Wayne Mad Ants	Fort Wayne, Indiana	Allen County War Memorial Coliseum	Joey Meyer (until January 6); Steve Gansey (from January 6)^{[b]}	Detroit Pistons, Indiana Pacers, Milwaukee Bucks
Iowa Energy	Des Moines, Iowa	Wells Fargo Arena	Kevin Young	Chicago Bulls, New Orleans Hornets, Washington Wizards
Maine Red Claws	Portland, Maine	Portland Expo Building	Dave Leitao	Boston Celtics, Charlotte Bobcats, Philadelphia 76ers
Sioux Falls Skyforce	Sioux Falls, South Dakota	Sioux Falls Arena	Morris McHone	Miami Heat, Minnesota Timberwolves, Orlando Magic
Springfield Armor	Springfield, Massachusetts	MassMutual Center	Bob MacKinnon, Jr.	New Jersey Nets
Western Conference
Austin Toros	Cedar Park, Texas	Cedar Park Center	Brad Jones	San Antonio Spurs
Bakersfield Jam	Bakersfield, California	Jam Events Center	Will Voigt	Los Angeles Clippers, Phoenix Suns, Toronto Raptors
Idaho Stampede	Boise, Idaho	CenturyLink Arena Boise	Randy Livingston	Denver Nuggets, Portland Trail Blazers, Utah Jazz
Los Angeles D-Fenders	El Segundo, California	Toyota Sports Center	Eric Musselman	Los Angeles Lakers
Reno Bighorns	Reno, Nevada	Reno Events Center	Paul Mokeski	Atlanta Hawks, Memphis Grizzlies, Sacramento Kings
Rio Grande Valley Vipers	Hidalgo, Texas	State Farm Arena	Nick Nurse	Houston Rockets
Texas Legends	Frisco, Texas	Dr Pepper Arena	Del Harris	Dallas Mavericks
Tulsa 66ers	Tulsa, Oklahoma	Tulsa Convention Center	Nate Tibbetts (until December 5); Dale Osbourne (from December 5)^{[a]}	Oklahoma City Thunder

=== Team changes ===
- On May 1, 2011, the Springfield Armor began a single-affiliation partnership with the New Jersey Nets. The Armor's basketball operation will be controlled by the Nets, who also became their sole NBA affiliate.
- On June 8, 2011, the Erie BayHawks began a single-affiliation partnership with the New York Knicks. The BayHawks' basketball operation will be controlled by the Knicks, who also became their sole NBA affiliate.
- On June 9, 2011, the Los Angeles D-Fenders, who suspended operation during the 2010–11 season, announced that they will return to play in the 2011–12 season. The franchise, which is owned and operated by the Los Angeles Lakers, relocated to El Segundo, California and resumed their single-affiliation partnership with the Lakers.
- On June 18, 2011, the Utah Flash announced that they would not play in the 2011–12 season as the team is up for sale.
- On June 28, 2011, the Dakota Wizards was purchased by the Golden State Warriors. The Wizards also began a single-affiliation partnership with the Warriors.
- On July 7, 2011, the New Mexico Thunderbirds was purchased by the Cleveland Cavaliers. The franchise relocated to Canton, Ohio and were later renamed as the Canton Charge. The Charge also began a single-affiliation partnership with the Cavaliers.

==== Affiliation changes ====
On July 7, 2011, the league announced the affiliation system for the season. Five teams, the Austin Toros, the Rio Grande Valley Vipers, the Texas Legends and the Tulsa 66ers, continued their single-affiliation partnerships with their parent teams. The Los Angeles D-Fenders, who returned after one-year hiatus, resumed their single-affiliation partnership with the Los Angeles Lakers. Four teams, the Canton Charge, the Dakota Wizards and the Erie BayHawks, each began a single-affiliation partnership with an NBA team. The Springfield Armor also began a single-affiliation partnership with the New Jersey Nets, their NBA affiliate for last two seasons. The other seven teams are affiliated with three NBA teams each. Only one team, the Fort Wayne Mad Ants, retained the same affiliates from the previous season. Due to several team changes above and other circumstances, some affiliation changes occurred.

^	Denotes a single-affiliation partnership

Team	NBA team	Previous affiliate	Note(s)
Bakersfield Jam	Phoenix Suns	Iowa Energy (2008–2011)	—
Bakersfield Jam	Toronto Raptors	Erie BayHawks (2009–2011)	• The BayHawks began a single-affiliation partnership with the New York Knicks.
Canton Charge^	Cleveland Cavaliers^	Erie BayHawks (2008–2011)	• The Cavaliers purchased the New Mexico Thunderbirds and relocated them to Canton, Ohio as the Canton Charge. • The BayHawks began a single-affiliation partnership with the New York Knicks.
Dakota Wizards^	Golden State Warriors^	Reno Bighorns (2010–2011)	• The Warriors purchased the Dakota Wizards.
Erie BayHawks^	New York Knicks^	Springfield Armor (2009–2011)	• The BayHawks began a single-affiliation partnership with the Knicks. • The Armor began a single-affiliation partnership with the New Jersey Nets.
Idaho Stampede	Utah Jazz	Utah Flash (2007–2011)	• The Flash ceased operations.
Iowa Energy	New Orleans Hornets	New Mexico / Albuquerque Thunderbirds (2009–2011)	• The Cleveland Cavaliers purchased the Thunderbirds and relocated them to Canton, Ohio as the Canton Charge.
Iowa Energy	Washington Wizards	Dakota Wizards (2006–2011)	• The Golden State Warriors purchased the Dakota Wizards.
Los Angeles D-Fenders^	Los Angeles Lakers^	Bakersfield Jam (2010–2011)	• The D-Fenders, who are owned and controlled by the Lakers, returned after a one-year hiatus.
Maine Red Claws	Philadelphia 76ers	Springfield Armor (2009–2011)	• The Armor began a single-affiliation partnership with the New Jersey Nets.
Reno Bighorns	Atlanta Hawks	Utah Flash (2009–2011)	• The Flash ceased operations.
Reno Bighorns	Memphis Grizzlies	Dakota Wizards (2007–2011)	• The Golden State Warriors purchased the Dakota Wizards.
Sioux Falls Skyforce	Orlando Magic	New Mexico Thunderbirds (2010–2011)	• The Cleveland Cavaliers purchased the Thunderbirds and relocated them to Canton, Ohio as the Canton Charge.

=== Coaching changes ===
Coaching changes
Offseason
Team	2010–11 coach	2011–12 coach
Canton Charge	Darvin Ham (with New Mexico Thunderbirds)	Alex Jensen
Dakota Wizards	Rory White	Nate Bjorkgren
Iowa Energy	Nick Nurse	Kevin Young
Los Angeles D-Fenders	Franchise inactive	Eric Musselman
Maine Red Claws	Austin Ainge	Dave Leitao
Reno Bighorns	Eric Musselman	Paul Mokeski
Rio Grande Valley Vipers	Chris Finch	Nick Nurse
Springfield Armor	Dee Brown	Bob MacKinnon, Jr.
Texas Legends	Nancy Lieberman	Del Harris
Utah Flash	Kevin Young	Franchise inactive
In-season
Team	Outgoing coach	New coach
Tulsa 66ers	Nate Tibbets	Dale Osbourne
Fort Wayne Mad Ants	Joey Meyer	Steve Gansey

==== Offseason ====
- On July 21, 2011, the Maine Red Claws hired former college coach Dave Leitao as the team's head coach, replacing Austin Ainge who was hired as the director of player personnel for the Boston Celtics on May 13, 2011.
- On August 3, 2011, the Dakota Wizards hired Iowa Energy assistant coach Nate Bjorkgren as the team's head coach, replacing Rory White who left the team after the 2010–11 season.
- On August 18, 2011, the Los Angeles D-Fenders hired Reno Bighorns head coach Eric Musselman as the team's head coach.
- On September 14, 2011, the Springfield Armor hired former Colorado 14ers and Idaho Stampede head coach Bob MacKinnon, Jr. as the team's head coach, replacing Dee Brown who was hired as the assistant coach for the Detroit Pistons.
- On September 19, 2011, the Rio Grande Valley Vipers hired Iowa Energy head coach Nick Nurse as the team's head coach, replacing Chris Finch who was hired as the assistant coach for the Houston Rockets on July 15, 2011.
- On September 29, 2011, the Reno Bighorns hired Rio Grande Valley Vipers assistant coach Paul Mokeski as the team's head coach, replacing Eric Musselman who was hired as the head coach for the Los Angeles D-Fenders on August 18, 2011.
- On October 4, 2011, the Texas Legends hired former NBA head coach Del Harris as the team's head coach, replacing Nancy Lieberman who was promoted to the front office as the assistant general manager for the Legends on July 18, 2011.
- On October 5, 2011, the Iowa Energy hired former Utah Flash head coach Kevin Young as the team's head coach, replacing Nick Nurse who was hired as the head coach for the Rio Grande Valley Vipers on September 19.
- On October 11, 2011, the Canton Charge hired former college assistant coach Alex Jensen as the team's head coach.

==== In-season ====
- ^{a} On December 5, 2011, the Tulsa 66ers promoted assistant coach Dale Osbourne, replacing Nate Tibbets who was hired as the assistant coach for the Cleveland Cavaliers.
- ^{b} On January 6, 2012, the Fort Wayne Mad Ants fired Joey Meyer and promoted assistant coach Steve Gansey to interim head coach.

== Players ==
An NBA D-League team roster consists of draftees, returning, allocation and tryout players. In addition, NBA teams can assign players who are on their first or second NBA season to their D-League affiliates. The roster must consist of 10 D-League players, but the maximum roster size is 12 players, including NBA assignees. If a team had more than two NBA assignees, the team must reduce its roster to avoid having more than 12 players. In the D-League, all players sign a one-year NBA D-League Standard Player Contract with the league, not with the specific D-League teams.

Returning players are players who played in the league during the previous season and are retained by their respective teams. The D-League teams are allowed to invite a limited number of returning players. Players who signed a D-League contract but are not retained by their previous teams are placed on the draft pool, along with new players who also sign with the league. Tryout players are the players who are invited to join the D-League team from the open tryouts which are held by each teams in October, before the season began.

=== Draft ===
The eleventh annual NBA Development League Draft was held on November 3, 2011. In this draft, all 16 teams took turns selecting eligible players for their roster. Former NBA first-round draft pick and eight-year NBA veteran Jamaal Tinsley was selected first by the Los Angeles D-Fenders. Another former NBA first-round pick Alando Tucker was selected second by the Texas Legends. Former NBA second-round pick Gabe Pruitt was also selected in the first-round. Other notable picks in the later rounds are former NBA players Cedric Bozeman and Chris Taft who were selected in the second and fourth round respectively. 18 players selected in the draft were participants of the NBA D-League National Tryouts that were held in June. A total of 127 players were selected in the eight-round draft.

=== Assignments ===
Each NBA team can assign players with two years or less of experience to its affiliated NBA Development League team. Players with more than two years of experience may be assigned to the D-League with the players' consent.

=== Call-ups ===
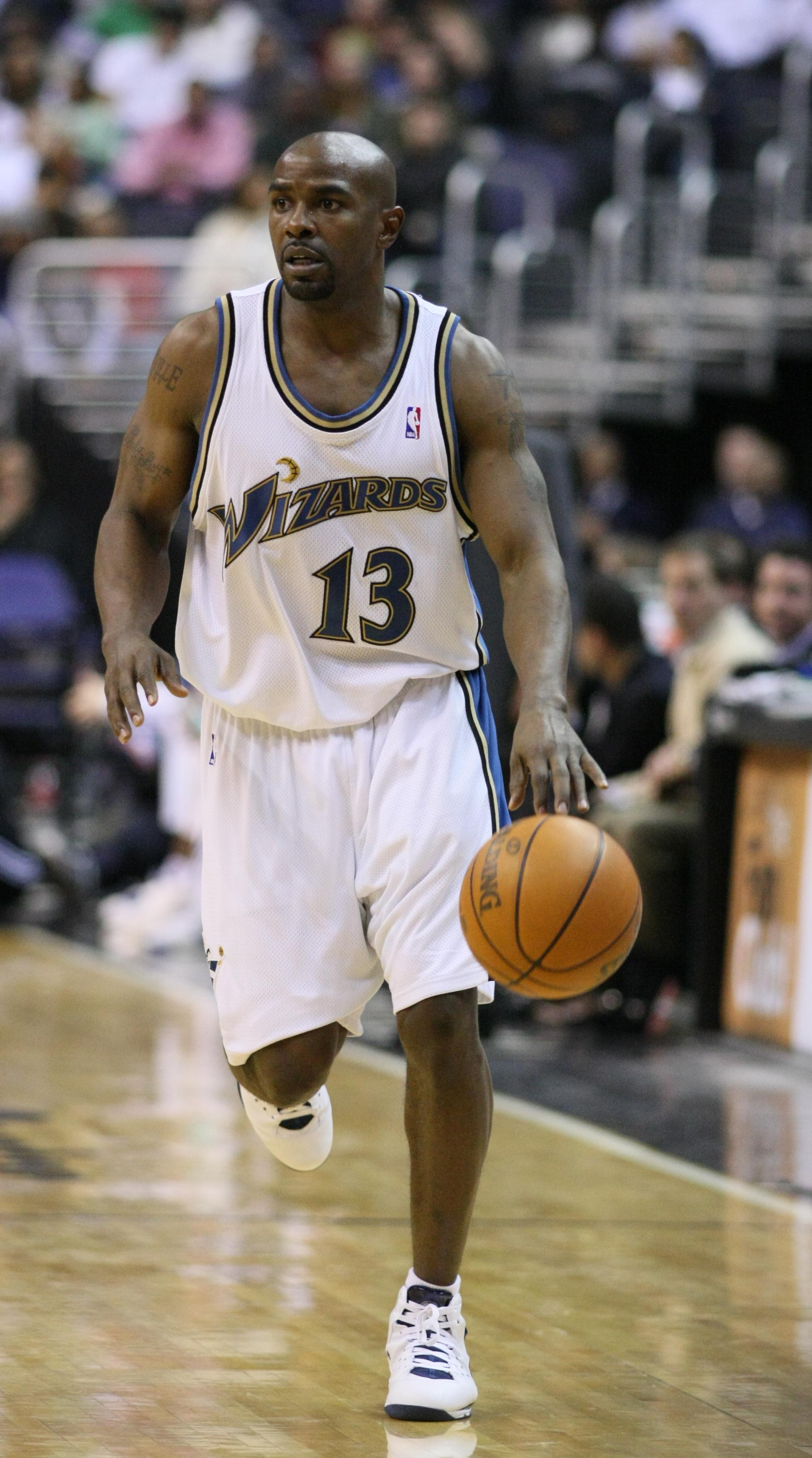
Nine-year NBA veteran Mike James was called up from the Erie BayHawks to the Chicago Bulls four times during the season.

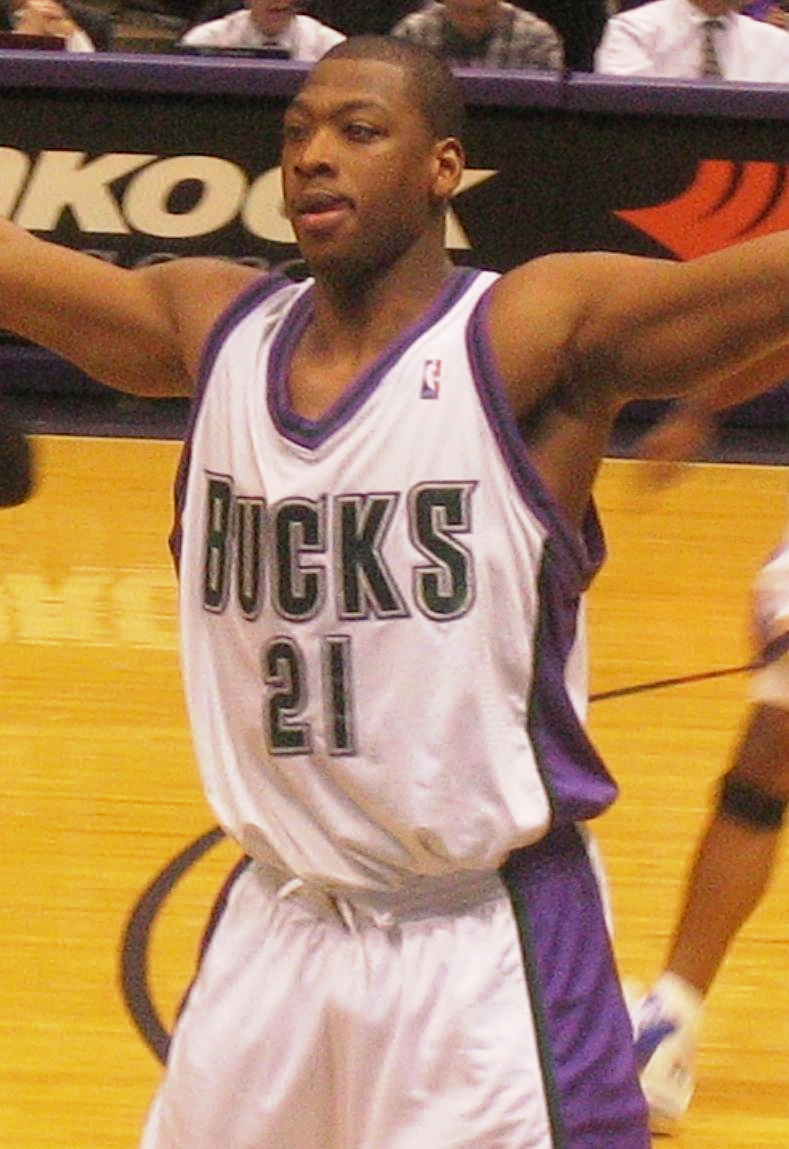
Nine-year NBA veteran Bobby Simmons was called up from the Reno Bighorns to the Los Angeles Clippers two times during the season.

A call-up occurs when a player is signed by an NBA team. An NBA team is allowed to sign any D-League player as long as they are eligible to play in the NBA under the current Collective Bargaining Agreement (CBA). However, an NBA team could not call-up a player whose draft rights are still held by other NBA teams. A D-League player is usually signed to a 10-day contracts, a short-term contract which lasted ten days and are available to be used starting February 6. A player can only sign two 10-day contracts with the same team in one season. If the team want to retain the player after the second 10-day contract expired, the team has to sign the player for the remainder of the season.

Due to the 2011 NBA lockout, the D-League season started earlier than the NBA season. Therefore, the NBA training camps, which are usually attended by a number of D-League players to compete for a spot on NBA roster, started on December 9, three weeks after the D-League season started. A total of 62 D-League players left their teams to attend NBA training camps. Eleven of them made the NBA opening day roster on December 25 and therefore they are considered as NBA call-ups.

As of April 6, 2012, there has been 49 call-ups, involving 33 different players. 22 of them are still on the NBA roster, although 6 of them are currently on 10-day contracts. The Los Angeles D-Fenders and the Austin Toros have the most players called up with five players, while the Erie BayHawks each has four players called up. Mike James received the most call-ups with four, all of them to the Chicago Bulls. Two players, Mickell Gladness and Donald Sloan, has been called up three times. Gladness was called up by the Miami Heat (twice) and the Golden State Warriors, while Sloan was called up to three different NBA teams, the Atlanta Hawks, the Cleveland Cavaliers and the New Orleans Hornets.

^	Denotes player who is currently in the NBA

Player	Team	NBA team	Date(s) called up and contract(s) signed	Ref
Dennis Horner	Springfield Armor	New Jersey Nets*	December 9, 2011: Signed for training camp December 25, 2011: Named in the opening day roster January 18, 2012: Waived	
Carldell Johnson	Austin Toros	New Orleans Hornets	December 9, 2011: Signed for training camp December 25, 2011: Named in the opening day roster February 7, 2012: Waived	
Donald Sloan	Erie BayHawks	Atlanta Hawks	December 9, 2011: Signed for training camp December 25, 2011: Named in the opening day roster January 26, 2012: Waived	
Greg Stiemsma^	Sioux Falls Skyforce	Boston Celtics	December 9, 2011: Signed for training camp December 25, 2011: Named in the opening day roster	
Lance Thomas	Austin Toros	New Orleans Hornets	December 9, 2011: Signed for training camp December 25, 2011: Named in the opening day roster December 31, 2011: Waived	
Mychel Thompson	Erie BayHawks	Cleveland Cavaliers	December 9, 2011: Signed for training camp December 25, 2011: Named in the opening day roster February 6, 2012: Waived	
Chris Wright^	Maine Red Claws	Golden State Warriors	December 10, 2011: Signed for training camp December 25, 2011: Named in the opening day roster	
Mickell Gladness	Dakota Wizards	Miami Heat	December 10, 2011: Signed for training camp December 25, 2011: Named in the opening day roster February 7, 2012: Waived	
Terrel Harris^	Rio Grande Valley Vipers	Miami Heat	December 10, 2011: Signed for training camp December 25, 2011: Named in the opening day roster	
Jamaal Tinsley^	Los Angeles D-Fenders	Utah Jazz	December 10, 2011: Signed for training camp December 25, 2011: Named in the opening day roster	
Ryan Reid	Tulsa 66ers	Oklahoma City Thunder*	December 13, 2011: Signed for training camp December 25, 2011: Named in the opening day roster March 21, 2012: Waived	
Cory Higgins^	Erie BayHawks	Charlotte Bobcats	December 26, 2011: Claimed off waivers from the Denver Nuggets (previously signed for training camp on December 9)	
Mike James	Erie BayHawks	Chicago Bulls	January 11, 2012: Signed; January 28, 2012: Waived	
Malcolm Thomas	Los Angeles D-Fenders	San Antonio Spurs	January 11, 2012: Signed; February 7, 2012: Waived	
Courtney Fortson	Los Angeles D-Fenders	Los Angeles Clippers	January 11, 2012: Signed; January 27, 2012: Waived	
Larry Owens	Tulsa 66ers	New Jersey Nets	January 18, 2012: Signed; January 31, 2012: Waived	
Walker Russell, Jr.^	Fort Wayne Mad Ants	Detroit Pistons*	January 20, 2012: Signed	
Ish Smith^	Los Angeles D-Fenders	Orlando Magic	February 2, 2012: Signed	
Lance Thomas^ (2)	Austin Toros	New Orleans Hornets	February 6, 2012: Signed a 10-day contract February 16, 2012: Signed a second 10-day contract February 27, 2012: Signed for the remainder of the season	
Donald Sloan (2)	Erie BayHawks	New Orleans Hornets	February 8, 2012: Signed a 10-day contract February 20, 2012: Signed a second 10-day contract	
Greg Smith^	Rio Grande Valley Vipers	Houston Rockets*	February 8, 2012: Signed	
Ben Uzoh	Rio Grande Valley Vipers	Cleveland Cavaliers	February 10, 2012: Signed a 10-day contract	
Mickell Gladness (2)	Dakota Wizards	Miami Heat	February 12, 2012: Signed a 10-day contract February 28, 2012: Signed a second 10-day contract	
Andre Emmett	Reno Bighorns	New Jersey Nets	February 14, 2012: Signed a 10-day contract	
Mike James (2)	Erie BayHawks	Chicago Bulls	February 14, 2012: Signed a 10-day contract	
Eric Dawson	Austin Toros	San Antonio Spurs*	February 20, 2012: Signed a 10-day contract	
Manny Harris	Canton Charge	Cleveland Cavaliers*	February 21, 2012: Signed a 10-day contract March 2, 2012: Signed to a second 10-day contract	
Gerald Green^	Los Angeles D-Fenders	New Jersey Nets	February 27, 2012: Signed a 10-day contract March 8, 2012: Signed a second 10-day contract March 18, 2012: Signed for the remainder of the season	
Bobby Simmons	Reno Bighorns	Los Angeles Clippers	February 27, 2012: Signed a 10-day contract March 9, 2012: Signed a second 10-day contract	
Jeff Foote	Springfield Armor	New Orleans Hornets	March 9, 2012: Signed a 10-day contract	
Mike James (3)	Erie BayHawks	Chicago Bulls	March 14, 2012: Signed a second 10-day contract	
Eric Dawson (2)	Austin Toros	San Antonio Spurs*	March 16, 2012: Signed a second 10-day contract	
Donald Sloan^ (3)	Erie BayHawks	Cleveland Cavaliers	March 16, 2012: Signed for the remainder of the season	
Jerry Smith	Springfield Armor	New Jersey Nets*	March 16, 2012: Signed a 10-day contract	
Courtney Fortson^ (2)	Los Angeles D-Fenders	Houston Rockets	March 17, 2012: Signed a 10-day contract March 27, 2012: Signed for the remainder of the season	
Manny Harris^ (2)	Canton Charge	Cleveland Cavaliers*	March 17, 2012: Signed for the remainder of the season	
Edwin Ubiles	Dakota Wizards	Washington Wizards	March 18, 2012: Signed a 10-day contract	
Mickell Gladness^ (3)	Dakota Wizards	Golden State Warriors	March 22, 2012: Signed a 10-day contract March 27, 2012: Signed for the remainder of the season	
Keith Benson	Sioux Falls Skyforce	Golden State Warriors	March 24, 2012: Signed a 10-day contract	
Justin Dentmon	Austin Toros	San Antonio Spurs*	March 24, 2012: Signed a 10-day contract	
Bobby Simmons^ (2)	Reno Bighorns	Los Angeles Clippers	March 24, 2012: Signed for the remainder of the season	
Alan Anderson^	Canton Charge	Toronto Raptors	March 26, 2012: Signed a 10-day contract April 6, 2012: Signed a second 10-day contract	
Malcolm Thomas (2)	Los Angeles D-Fenders	Houston Rockets	March 27, 2012: Signed a 10-day contract	
Ben Uzoh^ (2)	Rio Grande Valley Vipers	Toronto Raptors	March 27, 2012: Signed a 10-day contract April 6, 2012: Signed a second 10-day contract	
Cartier Martin^	Iowa Energy	Washington Wizards*	March 28, 2012: Signed a 10-day contract	
Dennis Horner^ (2)	Springfield Armor	New Jersey Nets*	March 30, 2012: Signed a 10-day contract	
Lester Hudson^	Austin Toros	Cleveland Cavaliers	March 30, 2012: Signed a 10-day contract	
Mike James^ (4)	Erie BayHawks	Chicago Bulls	April 5, 2012: Signed for the remainder of the season	
Justin Dentmon^ (2)	Austin Toros	Toronto Raptors	April 6, 2012: Signed a 10-day contract	

Note

- Number in parentheses indicates the number of call-ups a player has received during the season.
- Asterisk (*) indicates team affiliation

== Regular season ==
=== Showcase ===
The eighth annual NBA D-League Showcase was held at the Reno Events Center in Reno, Nevada from January 9 until January 12, 2012. The event featured every D-League team who played two games each over a four-day schedule. The games were attended by the professional scouts from all NBA teams. The event was designed to allow the NBA teams to evaluate the D-League's prospects for future call-ups.

=== Standings ===
==== Eastern Conference ====
Team	W	L	PCT	GB	Home	Road	Average Attendance
x-Springfield Armor (2)	29	21	.580	–	19–6	10–15	2,742
x-Dakota Wizards (4)	29	21	.580	–	17–8	12–13	2,563
x-Erie BayHawks (5)	28	22	.563	1.0	16–9	12–13	2,983
x-Canton Charge (7)	27	23	.540	2.0	15–10	12–13	2,722
x-Iowa Energy (8)	25	25	.500	4.0	17–8	8–17	4,306
Maine Red Claws	21	29	.420	8.0	11–14	10–15	2,969
Sioux Falls Skyforce	15	35	.292	14.0	10–15	5–20	2,764
Fort Wayne Mad Ants	14	36	.280	15.0	7–18	7–18	2,946

==== Western Conference ====
Team	W	L	PCT	GB	Home	Road	Average Attendance
x-Los Angeles D-Fenders (1)	38	12	.760	–	21–4	17–8	218
x-Austin Toros (3)	33	17	.660	5.0	19–6	14–11	2,838
x-Bakersfield Jam (6)	28	22	.560	10.0	17–8	11–14	500
Texas Legends	24	26	.480	14.0	15–10	9–16	4,428
Rio Grande Valley Vipers	24	26	.480	14.0	14–14	13–12	4,817
Tulsa 66ers	23	27	.460	15.0	13–12	10–15	2,089
Reno Bighorns	21	29	.420	17.0	12–13	9–16	2,375
Idaho Stampede	21	29	.420	17.0	13–12	8–17	500

Notes

- x indicates teams that have qualified for the playoff

=== Statistics leaders ===
As of April 29, 2012

Category	Player	Team	Statistic
Points per game	Blake Ahearn	Reno Bighorns	23.8
Rebounds per game	Marcus Lewis	Tulsa 66ers	12.7
Assists per game	Jeremy Wise; JamesOn Curry	Bakersfield Jam; Springfield Armor	6.3
Steals per game	Dominique Coleman	Sioux Falls Skyforce	2.2
Blocks per game	Hamady N'Diaye	Maine Red Claws; Iowa Energy	2.74
Field goal percentage	Greg Smith	Rio Grande Valley Vipers	.668
Three-point field goal percentage	Antoine Agudio	Canton Charge	.539
Free throw percentage	Blake Ahearn	Reno Bighorns	.962
Double-doubles	Marcus Lewis	Tulsa 66ers	34
Triple-doubles	Maurice Baker; Kenny Hayes; Elijah Millsap	Dakota Wizards; Maine Red Claws; Los Angeles D-Fenders	2

== All-Star Weekend ==
=== All-Star Game ===
The sixth annual NBA D-League All-Star Game was held during the 2012 NBA All-Star Weekend in Orlando, Florida. The game was played in the Orange County Convention Center on February 25. The Western Conference All-Stars defeated the Eastern Conference All-Stars 135–126, led by forward Gerald Green of the Los Angeles D-Fenders. Green scored a game-high 28 points and was named as the MVP of the game.

NBA TV

February 25
5:00 p.m. ET

Recap

Eastern Conference All-Stars 129, Western Conference All-Stars 132
Scoring by half: 54–56, 78–79
Pts: Jameson Curry 25; Rebs: Jeff Foote 7 Asts: Jameson Curry 8	Pts: Gerald Green 28; Rebs: Marcus Lewis 10; Asts: Dawson, Alhearn 8

Orange County Convention Center, Orlando, Florida
Referees:
- #63 Ben Taylor
- #11 Lauren Holtkamp
- #13 Steve Anderson

=== Dream Factory Friday Night ===
The fifth annual NBA D-League Dream Factory Friday Night was held on February 25 during the 2012 NBA All-Star Weekend. The events included a slam dunk contest, a three-point shooting contest and a shooting stars competition, all of which are also annual competitions in the NBA All-Star Saturday Night. In the Slam Dunk Contest, reigning champion L. D. Williams of the Springfield Armor retained the title after defeating Texas Legends center Chris Douglas-Roberts in the final round with a score of 93–90. Another player who won again was Legends guard Booker Woodfox in the Three-Point Contest. The Shooting Stars Competition was won by the team of Marqus Blakely (Sioux Falls), Jery Smith (Springfield) and Cameron Jones (Fort Wayne).

== Playoffs ==
First round
1	**Los Angeles***	**2**
7	Iowa	0
4	Dakota	0
6	**Bakersfield**	**2**
3	**Austin**	**2**
5	Erie	1
2	Springfield	1
7	**Canton**	**2**

Second round
1	**Los Angeles***	**2**
6	Bakersfield	0
3	**Austin***	**2**
7	Canton	1

Finals
1	Los Angeles*	1
3	**Austin**	**2**

Notes

- The numbers to the left of each team indicate the team's seeding.
- The numbers to the right indicate the number of games the team won in that round.
- The conference champions are marked by an asterisk (*).
- Teams in **bold** advanced to the next round.
- Teams in italics have home-court advantage in that round.

== Awards and honors ==
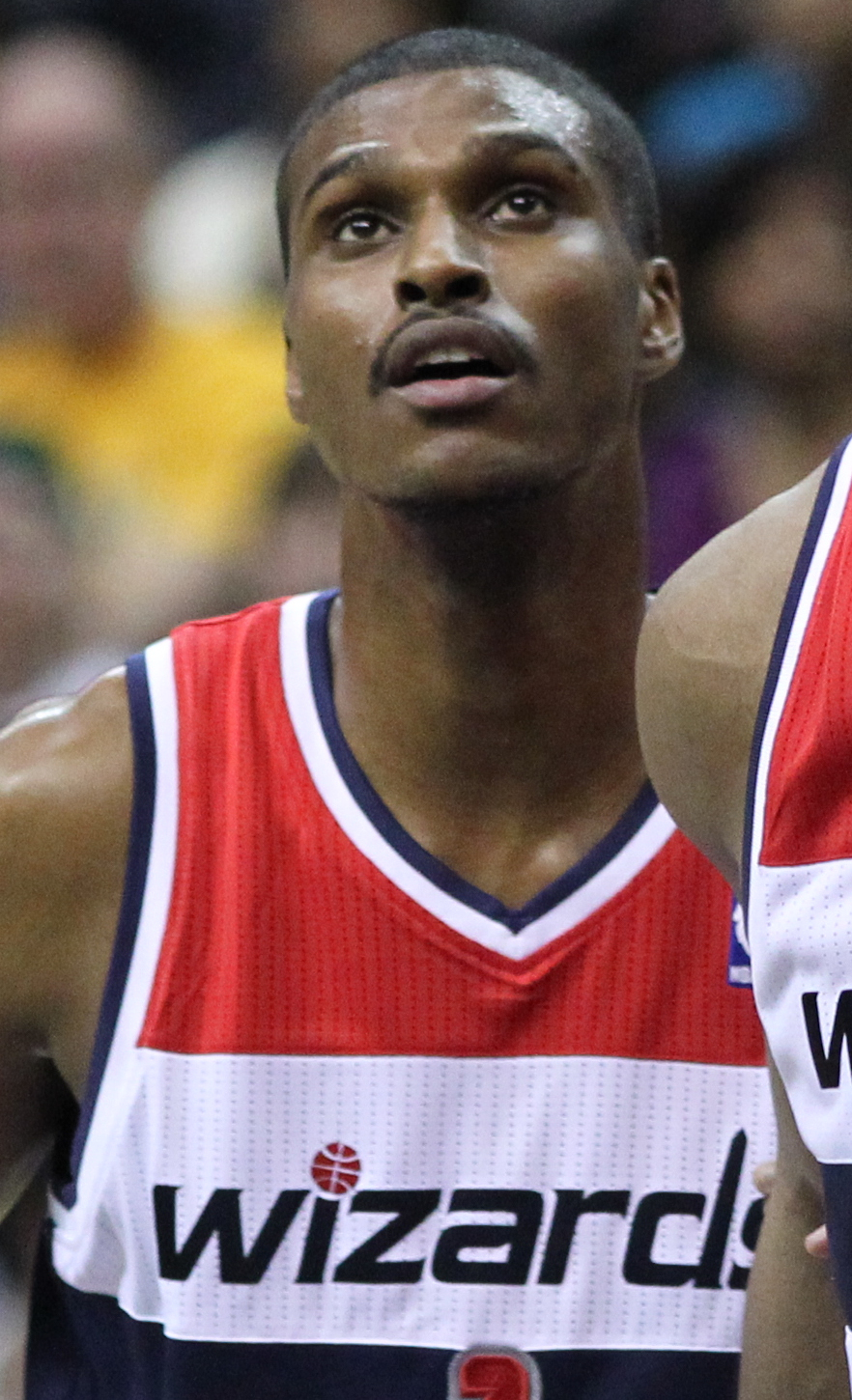
Edwin Ubiles was named 2012 Rookie of the Year.

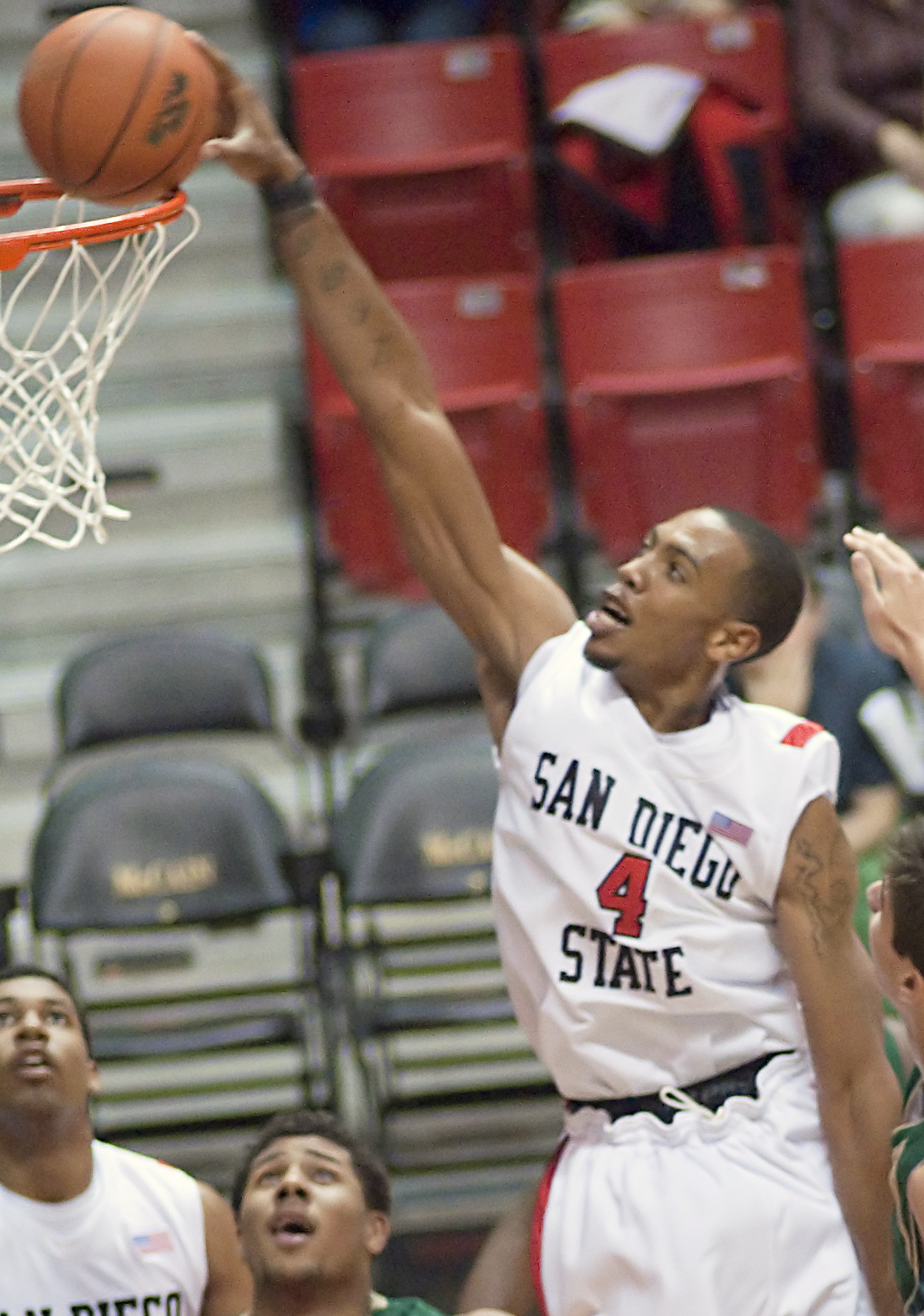
Malcolm Thomas was named to the All-NBA D-League First Team.

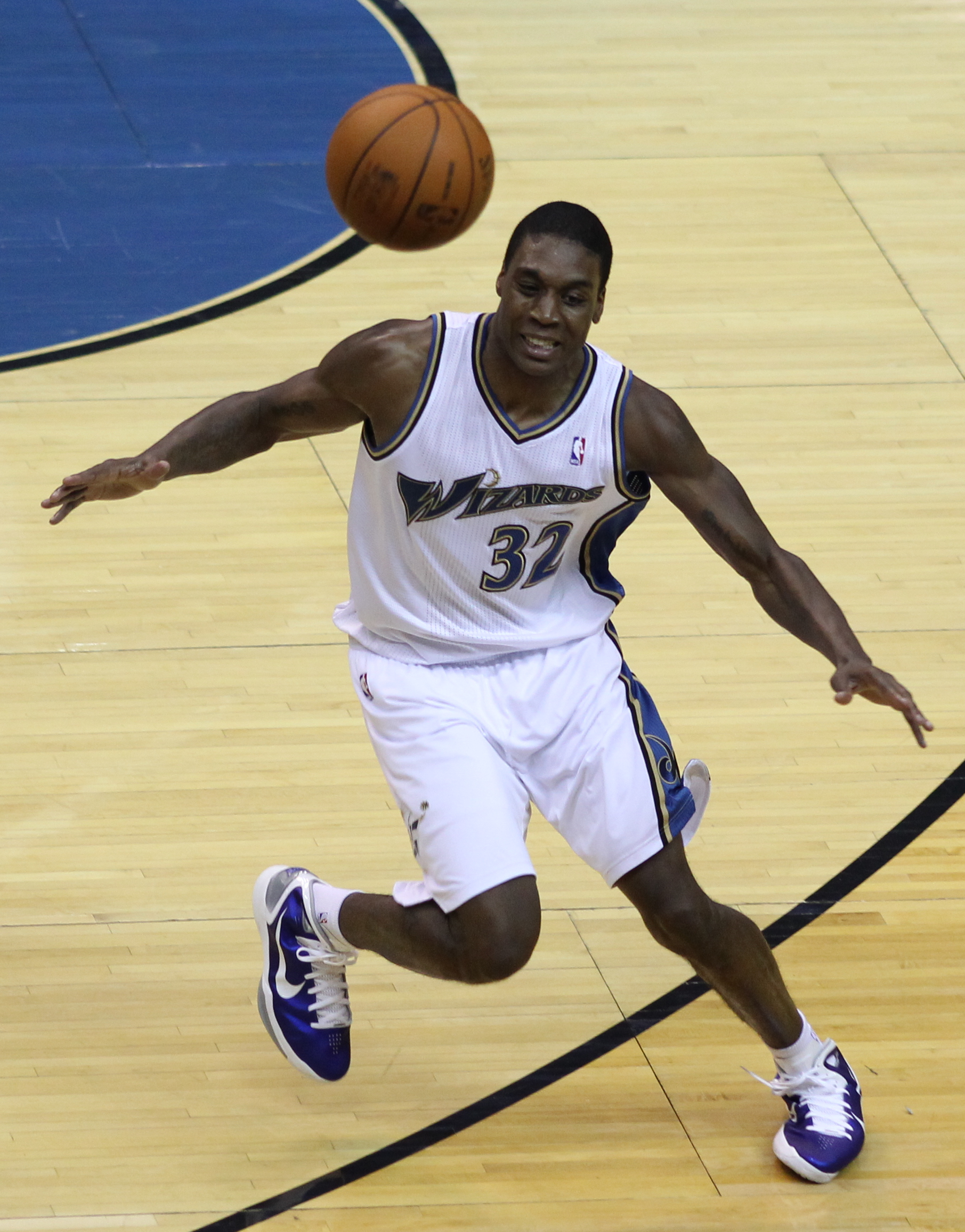
Larry Owens was named to the All-NBA Defensive Second Team.

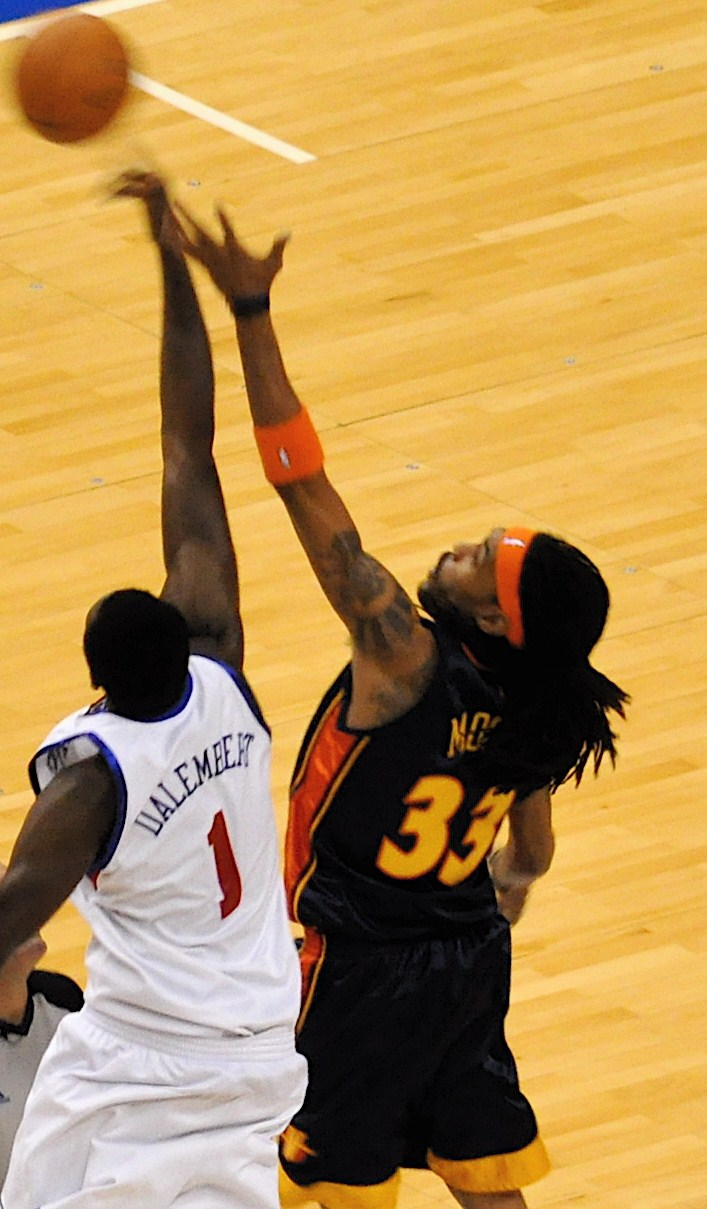
Mikki Moore was named to the All-NBA Defensive Second Team.

- Most Valuable Player: Justin Dentmon (Austin Toros)
- Coach of the Year: Eric Musselman (Los Angeles D-Fenders)
- Rookie of the Year: Edwin Ubiles (Dakota Wizards)
- Defensive Player of the Year: Stefhon Hannah (Dakota Wizards)
- Impact Player of the Year: Eric Dawson (Austin Toros)
- Most Improved Player: Kenny Hayes (Maine Red Claws)
- Executive of the Year:
- Sportsmanship Award: Moses Ehambe (Iowa Energy)
- All-NBA D-League Team:
  - First Team:
    - G Justin Dentmon (Austin Toros)
    - G Blake Ahearn (Reno Bighorns)
    - F Edwin Ubiles (Dakota Wizards)
    - F Malcolm Thomas (Los Angeles D-Fenders)
    - C Greg Smith (Rio Grande Valley Vipers)
  - Second Team:
    - G Elijah Millsap (Los Angeles D-Fenders)
    - G Courtney Fortson (Los Angeles D-Fenders)
    - F Marcus Lewis (Tulsa 66ers)
    - F Eric Dawson (Austin Toros)
    - C Jeff Foote (Springfield Armor)
  - Third Team:
    - G Morris Almond (Maine Red Claws)
    - G Jerry Smith (Springfield Armor)
    - F Brandon Costner (Los Angeles D-Fenders)
    - F Dennis Horner (Springfield Armor)
    - C Sean Williams (Texas Legends)
- All-Rookie Team:
  - First Team:
    - G Dwight Buycks (Tulsa 66ers)
    - G Cameron Jones (Fort Wayne Mad Ants)
    - F Edwin Ubiles (Dakota Wizards)
    - F Malcolm Thomas (Los Angeles D-Fenders)
    - C Greg Smith (Rio Grande Valley Vipers)
  - Second Team:
    - G Mustapha Farrakhan (Bakersfield Jam)
    - G Kyle Gibson (Canton Charge)
    - F D.J. Kennedy (Erie BayHawks)
    - F Mychel Thompson (Erie BayHawks)
    - C Jamie Vanderbeken (Bakersfield Jam)
- All-Defensive Team:
  - First Team:
    - G Stefhon Hannah (Dakota Wizards)
    - G Jerry Smith (Springfield Armor)
    - F Marcus Dove (Dakota Wizards)
    - F Malcolm Thomas (Los Angeles D-Fenders)
    - C Sean Williams (Texas Legends)
  - Second Team:
    - G Jerome Dyson (Tulsa 66ers)
    - G Courtney Fortson (Los Angeles D-Fenders)
    - F Marcus Lewis (Tulsa 66ers)
    - F Larry Owens (Tulsa 66ers)
    - C Mikki Moore (Idaho Stampede)
- Player of the Month:
  - December: Brandon Costner (Los Angeles D-Fenders)
  - January: Justin Dentmon (Austin Toros)
  - February: Jerry Smith (Springfield Armor)
  - March: Jamario Moon (Los Angeles D-Fenders)
- Performers of the Week:
  - November 25–December 4: Walker Russell, Jr. (Fort Wayne Mad Ants)
  - December 5–11: Brandon Costner (Los Angeles D-Fenders)
  - December 12–18: Stanley Asumnu (Rio Grande Valley Vipers)
  - December 19–25: Anthony Mason, Jr. (Sioux Falls Skyforce)
  - December 26–January 1: Blake Ahearn and Andre Emmett (both Reno Bighorns)
  - January 2–8: Not awarded
  - January 9–15: Justin Dentmon (Austin Toros)
  - January 16–22: Ben Uzoh (Rio Grande Valley Vipers)
  - January 23–29: Manny Harris (Canton Charge)
  - January 30–February 5: Jerry Smith (Springfield Armor)
  - February 6–12: Gerald Green (Los Angeles D-Fenders)
  - February 13–19: Manny Harris (Canton Charge)
  - February 20–26: Not awarded (All-Star break)
  - February 27–March 4: Morris Almond and Kenny Hayes (both Maine Red Claws)
  - March 5–11: Luke Harangody (Canton Charge) and Donald Sloan (Erie BayHawks)
  - March 12–18: Marqus Blakely (Sioux Falls Skyforce) and Brian Butch (Bakersfield Jam)
  - March 19–25: Cory Joseph (Austin Toros)
  - March 26–April 1: Stefhon Hannah (Dakota Wizards)
  - April 2–7: Elijah Millsap (Los Angeles D-Fenders)
