= Justin Dentmon =

American basketball player (born 1985)

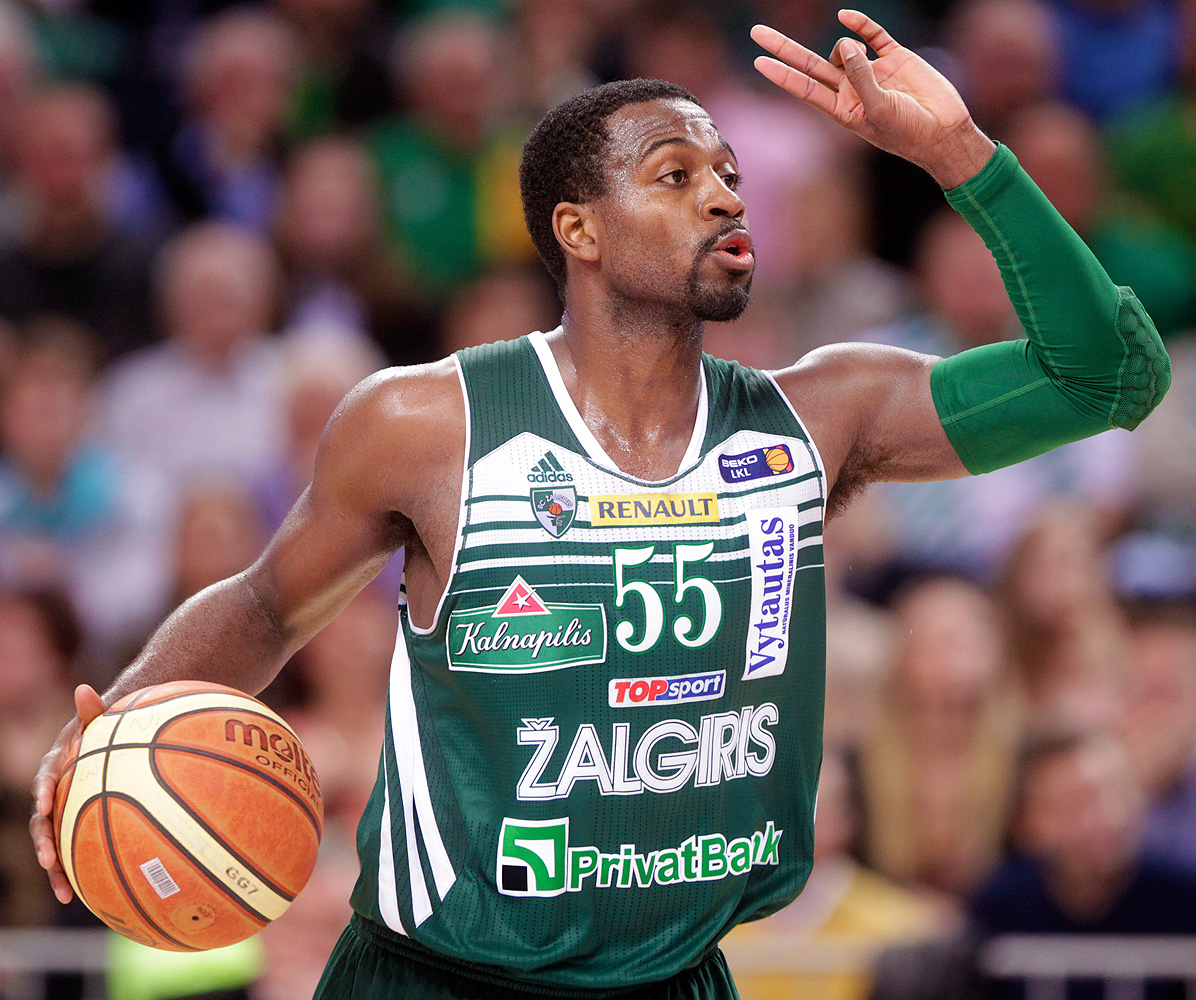
- Dentmon with Žalgiris Kaunas in 2014

Personal information
- Born: September 5, 1985 (age 41) Carbondale, Illinois, U.S.
- Listed height: 6 ft 0 in (1.83 m)
- Listed weight: 185 lb (84 kg)

Career information
- High school: Carbondale (Carbondale, Illinois); The Winchendon School (Winchendon, Massachusetts)
- College: Washington (2005–2009)
- NBA draft: 2009: undrafted
- Playing career: 2009–2024
- Position: Point guard

Career history
- 2009–2010: Hapoel Afula
- 2010–2011: Texas Legends
- 2011: Toros de Aragua
- 2011: Cocolos
- 2011–2013: Austin Toros
- 2012: San Antonio Spurs
- 2012: Toronto Raptors
- 2012: Olimpia Milano
- 2013: Texas Legends
- 2013: Dallas Mavericks
- 2013: Capitanes de Arecibo
- 2013–2014: Žalgiris Kaunas
- 2014–2015: Qingdao DoubleStar
- 2015: Texas Legends
- 2015–2016: Sichuan Blue Whales
- 2016: Galatasaray
- 2016–2017: Shandong Golden Stars
- 2017–2019: Texas Legends
- 2019: Busan KT SonicBoom
- 2019: Beirut Club
- 2019–2020: Élan Béarnais
- 2020–2021: Bakken Bears
- 2021: Zob Ahan Isfahan
- 2021: Mets de Guaynabo
- 2022–2023: Grises de Humacao
- 2024: Halcones Rojos Veracruz

Career highlights
- FIBA Champions League Top Scorer (2019); CBA champion (2016); NBA D-League champion (2012); NBA D-League Most Valuable Player (2012); NBA D-League All-Star (2013); All-NBA D-League First Team (2012); LKL All-Star (2014); LKL All-Star Game MVP (2014); LKL champion (2014); Israeli League Top Scorer (2010); First-team All-Pac-10 (2009)
- Stats at NBA.com
- Stats at Basketball Reference
Medals
Men's basketball
Representing United States
Pan American Games
Bronze medal – third place	2011 Guadalajara	United States

Justin Lorenzo Dentmon (born September 5, 1985) is an American former professional basketball player He played college basketball for Washington. In 2010, he was the top scorer in the Israel Basketball Premier League.

== High school career ==
In 2004 Dentmon led his Carbondale Community High School team to a fourth place state finish, during his senior season. He was the top scorer in the 2004 state tournament in Peoria scoring 78 points in only three games. Dentmon led his team in points with 22.1 points per game accumulating 773 points over his senior season. In that same year, he was named to the Illinois Basketball Coaches Association All-State 1st team, the class AA All-Star 1st team and named the South Seven Conference MVP.^{[1]}

After originally committing to play basketball at Illinois State University in Normal, Illinois Dentmon decided to play another year of prep basketball at The Winchendon School in Winchendon, Massachusetts. The NCAA men's basketball academic qualifier rules would have sidelined him for one whole season in Normal, which influenced his decision to continue his prep career. Dentmon's efforts on the court and the classroom at The Winchendon School help him secure a scholarship with the University of Washington.

== College career ==
In his freshman year at the University of Washington, Dentmon started in 32 out of 33 games and was named to the All-Pac-10 freshmen team by the league's coaches. Dentmon had one of the most productive freshman seasons in University of Washington basketball history. He led the Huskies in both steals with 52, and free throw percentage (81.4%). He was also second on the team in assists with 3.7 per game. Dentmon helped the Huskies to a 26–7 record and their second consecutive NCAA tournament Sweet Sixteen appearance.

By the conclusion of his time at the University of Washington, Dentmon accumulated 1,425 points, tied for 12th all-time in UW's history with Bill Hanson; he also finished fourth on the UW career three point field-goals list with 133 field goals made. Dentmon also finished third all-time in assists with 401, and second in steals with 180.

== Professional career ==
In 2010, he was the top scorer in the Israel Basketball Premier League.

During the 2011–12 season, Dentmon played brief stints with both the San Antonio Spurs and the Toronto Raptors of the National Basketball Association.

On April 21, 2012, Dentmon was named the NBA D-League's Most Valuable Player for the 2011–12 season. Dentmon started in all 40 regular season games he played for the Austin Toros, averaging 22.8 points, 5.5 assists, 3.7 rebounds, 1.6 steals and 37.2 minutes. Also named a 2012 NBA D-League All-Star, Dentmon ranked fourth in the league in scoring, finishing with double-digit points in 39 games. He led the Toros in scoring in 24 games and was the assist leader 26 times.

In April 2012, Dentmon signed with the Italian team Olimpia Milano. On November 1, 2012, Dentmon re-signed with the Austin Toros. On January 22, 2013, he was traded to the Texas Legends.

On February 14, 2013, Dentmon was named to the Prospects All-Star roster for the 2013 NBA D-League All-Star Game as a replacement for Cory Joseph.

On March 25, 2013, Dentmon signed a 10-day contract with the Dallas Mavericks. He played two games for the Mavs before being released on April 3. He returned to the Legends following his NBA stint. Afterward, he joined the Capitanes de Arecibo of Puerto Rico.

On August 30, 2013, Dentmon signed a one-year deal with Žalgiris Kaunas. He was named EuroLeague MVP of the Week during the fifth week after scoring 24 points (2/4 two-pointers, 6/6 three-pointers), dishing out 9 assists, rebounding 2 rebounds and making 2 steals. On February 15, 2014, he earned bwin MVP honors for the week after leading Zalgiris Kaunas to its first Top 16 victory over Partizan NIS Belgrade on February 13. Dentmon turned in one of the best games of his debut Turkish Airlines EuroLeague campaign with a performance index rating of 33 to lead all players in week 6 of league play. He produced 23 points on 2-for-2 two-point and 5-of-10 three-point shooting plus 5 rebounds, 6 assists, 1 steal, 1 block and 8 fouls drawn. On April 12, Dentmon led his team to an 87–80 victory over Real Madrid in the Lithuanian champs’ final EuroLeague game of the season. Dentmon scored 36 points on 7-of-11 three-point shooting en route to a performance index rating of 40, which led all players for Round 14 and made him the bwin MVP for the third time this season. During the game, Dentmon set the competition record for most three-pointers in a season with 74, and also set a new team mark for points in a game. His all-around performance also included 4-of-5 two-point shooting, 7 free throws made without a miss, 5 rebounds, 3 assists and 2 steals. His many clutch baskets also helped Zalgiris win the LKL title for the 4th consecutive time.

On July 28, 2014, Dentmon signed with the Qingdao DoubleStar of China. On March 10, 2015, he was reacquired by the Texas Legends. In his debut, he scored 20 points (4–7 beyond the arc) and gave 8 assists in 38 minutes of play. The Legends lost to the Delaware 87ers 122–119.

On August 19, 2016, Dentmon signed with Turkish club Galatasaray for the 2016–17 season. In December 2016, he parted ways with Galatasaray and signed with Chinese club Shandong Golden Stars for the rest of the 2016–17 CBA season. He was replaced on the roster in February 2017 with A. J. Price.

On October 26, 2017, Dentmon was acquired by the Texas Legends where he played till the end of the season.

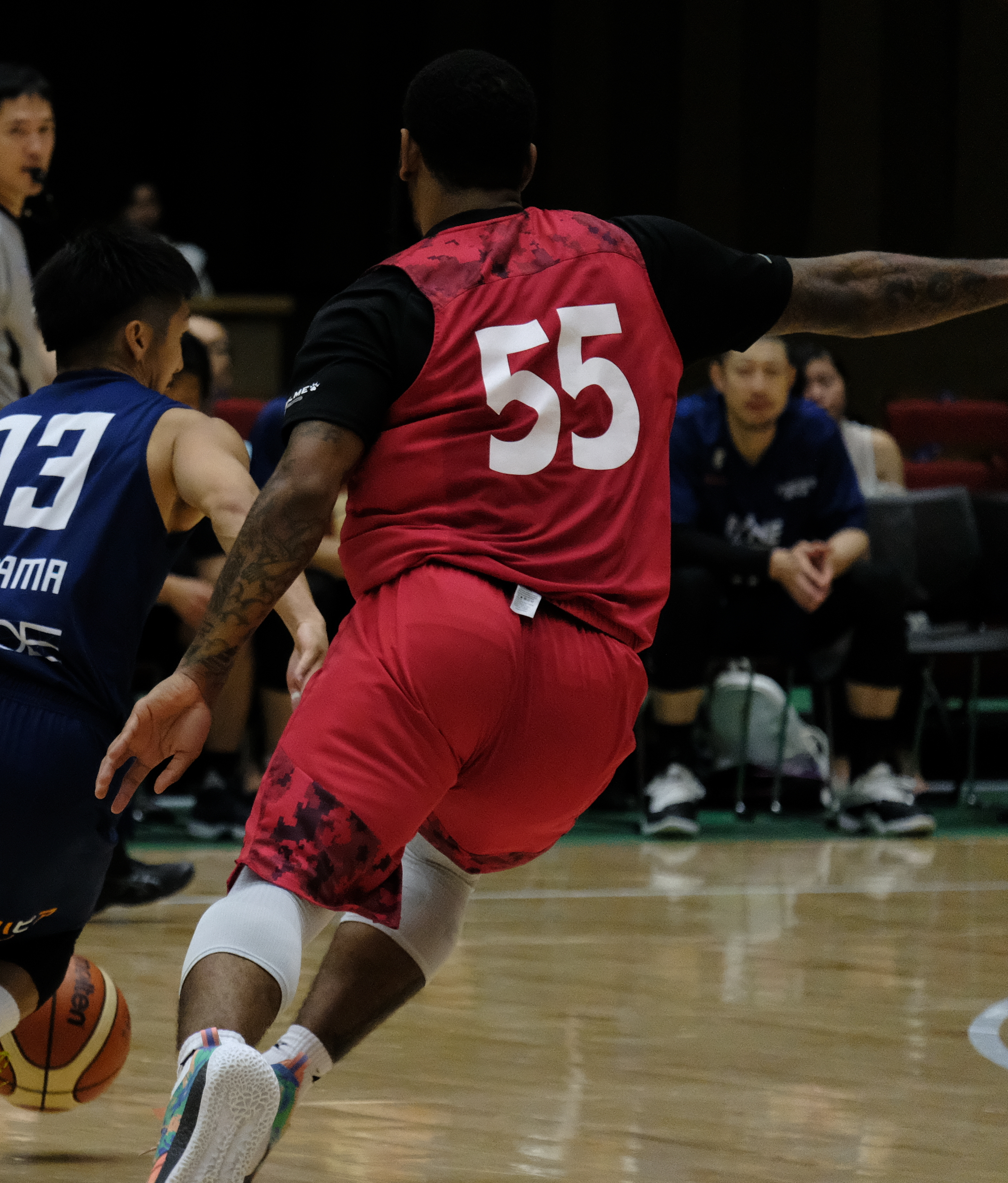

Dentmon started the 2018–2019 season as free agent. On January 2, 2019, returned to the Texas Legends, where he played seven games in the NBA G League, averaging 17.4 points per game. On January 23, 2019, Dentmon agrees to deal with the Busan KT SonicBoom of the Korean Basketball League.

On April 12, 2019, he has signed with Beirut Club of the Lebanese Basketball League.

On November 2, 2019, he has signed with Élan Béarnais of the LNB Pro A. He averaged 20.9 points last season in BCL, leading all scorers in the competition.

Dentmon signed with the Bakken Bears of the Basketligaen on July 22, 2020.

== The Basketball Tournament (TBT) ==
In the summer of 2017, Dentmon played in The Basketball Tournament on ESPN for The Stickmen. He competed for the $2 million prize, and for The Stickmen, he averaged 13.5 points per game, also shooting 89 percent from the free-throw line. Dentmon helped take The Stickmen to the second round of the tournament, where they then lost to Team Challenge ALS, 87–73.

== Career statistics ==
Legend
GP	Games played	GS	Games started	MPG	Minutes per game
FG%	Field-goal percentage	3P%	3-point field-goal percentage	FT%	Free-throw percentage
RPG	Rebounds per game	APG	Assists per game	SPG	Steals per game
BPG	Blocks per game	PPG	Points per game	PIR	Performance index rating
**Bold**	Career high

=== NBA ===
==== Regular season ====
Year	Team	GP	GS	MPG	FG%	3P%	FT%	RPG	APG	SPG	BPG	PPG
2011–12	San Antonio	2	0	9.5	.333	.000	.000	.5	.5	**.5**	.0	2.0
2011–12	Toronto	**4**	0	**18.0**	**.364**	**.200**	**.667**	**1.8**	**2.3**	.3	.0	**5.5**
2012–13	Dallas	2	0	2.0	.000	.000	.000	.0	.0	.0	.0	0.0
Career		8	0	11.9	.333	.143	.667	1.0	1.3	.3	.0	3.3

=== EuroLeague ===
Year	Team	GP	GS	MPG	FG%	3P%	FT%	RPG	APG	SPG	BPG	PPG	PIR
2013–14	Žalgiris	24	23	29.6	.433	.443	.863	3.5	4.1	1.3	.1	16.8	15.3
2016–17	Galatasaray	8	2	20.2	.484	.400	.824	1.3	2.3	.8	.1	12.3	9.5
Career		24	23	29.6	.433	.443	.863	3.5	4.1	1.3	.1	16.8	15.3

=== Domestic leagues ===
Season	Team	League	GP	MPG	FG%	3P%	FT%	RPG	APG	SPG	BPG	PPG
2009–10	Hapeol Afula	ISBL	22	31.9	.508	.363	.822	3.8	2.8	1.8	.0	19.8
2010–11	Texas Legends	D-League	52	34.8	.510	.424	.843	3.4	4.0	1.4	.1	18.7
2011	Toros de Aragua	Venezuela LPB	?	?	?	?	?	3.7	4.2	?	?	20.8
2011	Cocolos de San Pedro	Dominican LNB	16	29.0	.467	.135	.778	2.1	2.7	1.3	.0	14.5
2011–12	Austin Toros	D-League	47	36.6	.489	.419	.873	3.6	5.3	1.5	.1	22.2
2011–12	EA7 Emporio Armani Milano	Lega A	3	12.3	.429	.200	1.000	1.3	1.3	.3	.0	4.3
2012–13	Texas Legends	D-League	24	38.7	.498	.356	.817	3.3	3.6	1.7	.1	26.8
2012–13	Austin Toros	D-League	18	34.8	.396	.373	.835	4.6	4.1	1.0	.1	17.8
2013	Capitanes de Arecibo	BSN	16	31.3	.521	.374	.755	2.8	4.7	1.3	.0	14.8
2013–14	Žalgiris	Lithuania LKL	29	24.8	.466	.396	.833	3.8	3.8	1.9	.1	14.2
2014–15	Qingdao DoubleStar	China CBA	44	35.7	.569	.443	.895	4.3	5.0	1.5	.0	30.4
2014–15	Texas Legends	D-League	13	37.8	.421	.439	.889	4.5	6.3	1.0	.2	16.3
