= Jerry Smith (basketball, born 1987) =

American basketball player (born 1987)

Personal information
- Born: September 26, 1987 (age 38) Wauwatosa, Wisconsin, U.S.
- Listed height: 6 ft 2 in (1.88 m)
- Listed weight: 195 lb (88 kg)

Career information
- High school: Wauwatosa East (Wauwatosa, Wisconsin)
- College: Louisville (2006–2010)
- NBA draft: 2010: undrafted
- Playing career: 2010–2023
- Position: Point guard / shooting guard

Career history
- 2010–2012: Springfield Armor
- 2011: Waikato Pistons
- 2012: New Jersey Nets
- 2012–2013: Mapooro Cantù
- 2013–2014: Tezenis Verona
- 2014–2015: Maccabi Rishon LeZion
- 2015–2016: Eisbären Bremerhaven
- 2016–2017: Samsunspor
- 2017: Champagne Châlons-Reims
- 2017–2018: Karesi Spor
- 2018–2020: Ifaistos Limnou
- 2020–2021: Larisa
- 2021–2022: Lavrio
- 2022: Final Gençlik
- 2022: OGM Ormanspor
- 2023: Al-Arabi SC

Career highlights
- All-NBA D-League Third Team (2012); Fourth-team Parade All-American (2006)
- Stats at NBA.com
- Stats at Basketball Reference

Jerry Smith (born September 26, 1987) is an American former professional basketball player who last played for Al-Arabi SC of the Qatari Basketball League.

== High school ==
Jerry Smith played for Wauwatosa East High School where he holds the school's career scoring record.

== College career ==
He played college basketball for the Louisville Cardinals. In his debut as a Cardinal, Smith broke the record for most points scored by a freshman in his first game. On February 17, 2007, Smith hit a deep, buzzer-beating 3-pointer that gave the Cardinals a 61–59 upset victory over Marquette.

On February 17, 2007, Smith hit a game winning 35 footer at the buzzer. After the February 17 game, Crean gave credit to Jerry, saying that he "made a tough shot." Smith said he was speechless and that "I never dreamed about this."

Prior to college, Smith played AAU basketball for DTA of Milwaukee and the Playground Warriors. He helped the first of the two to a 2nd-place finish in the national tournament.

== Professional career ==
Smith started playing for the Milwaukee Bucks NBA Summer League team in Las Vegas. Later he played for Springfield Armor in the NBA Development League. In March 2011 he signed with Waikato Pistons in New Zealand.

Smith was called up by the New Jersey Nets from the Springfield Armor on March 16, 2012. He made his NBA debut with 5 points in 20 minutes against Orlando. He returned to the Armor on March 26, 2012.

On July 11, 2012, Smith signed with Pallacanestro Cantù. In August 2013, he signed with Tezenis Verona.

In August 2014, he signed with Maccabi Rishon LeZion of Israel. On February 8, 2015, he left Maccabi and signed with Eisbären Bremerhaven of the German Basketball Bundesliga. On June 7, 2015, he re-signed with Eisbären Bremerhaven for one more season.

On August 6, 2018, he joined Ifaistos Limnou of the Greek Basket League. On August 7, 2019, Smith renewed his contract with the Greek club for another season. On August 19, 2020, Smith moved to fellow Greek Basket League club Larisa. On August 3, 2021, Smith signed with Greek Basket League finalists Lavrio. He averaged 8.4 points, 1.6 rebounds, and 1.2 assists per game.

On March 1, 2022, Smith signed with Final Gençlik of the Turkish Basketball First League. He subsequently joined OGM Ormanspor but left the team in November 2022 after three games. On March 4, 2023, Smith signed with Al-Arabi SC of the Qatari Basketball League.

=== The Basketball Tournament (TBT) (2017–present) ===
In the summer of 2017, Smith played in The Basketball Tournament on ESPN for Team Challenge ALS. He competed for the $2 million prize in 2017, and for Team Challenge ALS, he averaged 9.2 points per game, also shooting 83 percent from the free-throw line. Smith helped take the sixth-seeded Team Challenge ALS to the Championship Game of the tournament, where they lost in a close game to Overseas Elite 86–83.

In TBT 2018, Smith averaged 2.8 points per game and one steal per game for Team Challenge ALS. They reached the West Regional Championship Game before losing to eventual tournament runner-up Eberlein Drive.

== Career statistics ==
Legend
GP	Games played	GS	Games started	MPG	Minutes per game
FG%	Field goal percentage	3P%	3-point field goal percentage	FT%	Free throw percentage
RPG	Rebounds per game	APG	Assists per game	SPG	Steals per game
BPG	Blocks per game	PPG	Points per game	**Bold**	Career high

=== NBA ===
Year	Team	GP	GS	MPG	FG%	3P%	FT%	RPG	APG	SPG	BPG	PPG
2011–12	New Jersey	5	0	9.2	.214	.167	–	1.4	.8	1.0	.0	1.4
Career		5	0	9.2	.214	.167	–	1.4	.8	1.0	.0	1.4

== See also ==
- 2006 high school boys basketball All-Americans
