= Morris Almond =

American basketball player (born 1985)

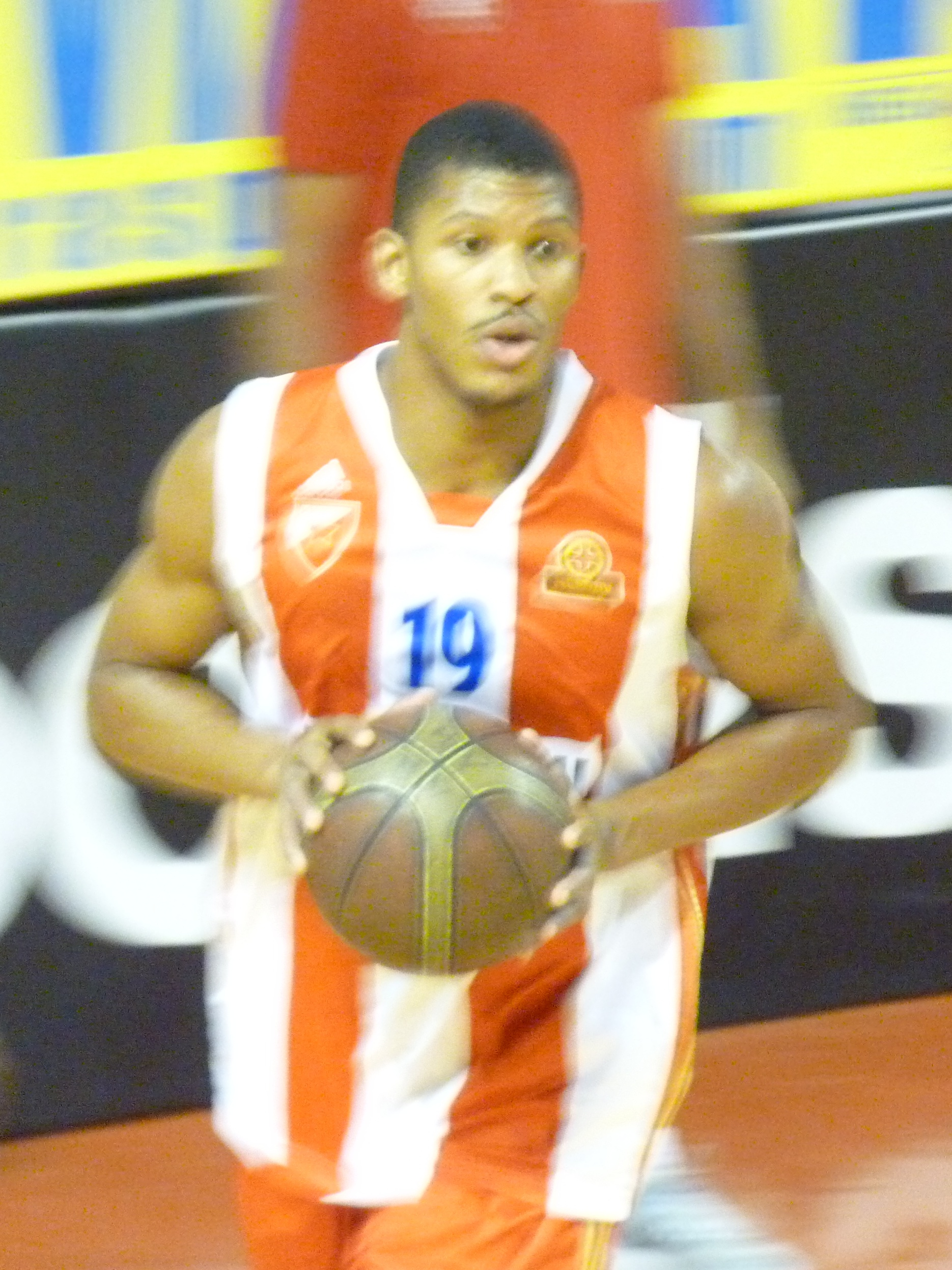
- Almond with Crvena zvezda in 2012

Personal information
- Born: February 2, 1985 (age 41) Dalton, Georgia, U.S.
- Listed height: 6 ft 5 in (1.96 m)
- Listed weight: 210 lb (95 kg)

Career information
- High school: McEachern (Powder Springs, Georgia)
- College: Rice (2003–2007)
- NBA draft: 2007: 1st round, 25th overall pick
- Drafted by: Utah Jazz
- Playing career: 2007–2013
- Position: Shooting guard
- Number: 21, 22, 19

Career history
- 2007–2009: Utah Jazz
- 2007–2009: →Utah Flash
- 2009–2010: Springfield Armor
- 2010: Maine Red Claws
- 2010: Real Madrid
- 2010–2011: Scavolini Pesaro
- 2011: BC Cherkasy
- 2012: Maine Red Claws
- 2012: Washington Wizards
- 2012: Crvena zvezda
- 2012–2013: Iowa Energy
- 2013: Los Angeles D-Fenders

Career highlights
- 2× All-NBA D-League Third Team (2008, 2012); NBA D-League Impact Player of the Year (2008); Conference USA Player of the Year (2007); 2× First-team All-Conference USA (2006, 2007)

Career NBA statistics
- Points: 119 (3.1 ppg)
- Rebounds: 46 (1.2 rpg)
- Assists: 12 (0.3 apg)
- Stats at NBA.com
- Stats at Basketball Reference

Morris Almond (born February 2, 1985) is an American former professional basketball player. Almond is the founder of Almond Athletics. His last professional appearance would be for the Los Angeles D-Fenders of the NBA Development League (D-League).

== High school ==
Almond was born in Dalton, Georgia and attended McEachern High School in Powder Springs, Georgia, where he was a teammate of fellow professional basketball player Josh Smith. Almond was the first basketball player in McEachern school history to have his #22 jersey retired.

== College career ==
Almond played college basketball at Rice University, where he was a member of Martel residential college. During his junior season, Almond's scoring average jumped to 21.9 points per game (up from 7.2 points per game as a sophomore). His scoring average led all players in Conference USA.

During his senior year, Almond's scoring average increased to 26.4 points per game, ranking third in the nation. He was named Conference USA Player of the Year and was named AP All-America Honorable Mention.

Almond finished his career at Rice with 121 games played and a scoring average of 15.1 points per game. He was also the first Rice basketball player to appear on the cover of a national publication. After graduation, he was selected by the Utah Jazz in the first round (25th pick) in the 2007 NBA draft.

== Professional career ==
Almond played in 9 games during his rookie season with the Jazz, averaging 4.3 minutes. His NBA career high is currently 12 points, at Sacramento on December 2, 2008. He scored his first NBA points on January 8, 2008, against the Indiana Pacers, with 2 points on 1-of-5 shooting. However, he spent most of the season with the team's D-League affiliate, the Utah Flash, to whom he was assigned. He led the D-League in scoring during the season, averaging 25.6 points per game. In just his fifth game with the team on December 21, 2007, he tied a league record with 51 points in a 118–116 victory over the Austin Toros. Later in the season, he broke the record with a 53-point performance against the Bakersfield Jam in a 102–87 win. The record was tied by Will Conroy in 2009 and surpassed by Pierre Jackson in 2014 (58).

On September 18, 2009, Morris Almond signed with the Orlando Magic. He was waived on October 21, 2009. Almond later played for the Maine Red Claws and Springfield Armor of the NBA Development League. He then signed with Real Madrid Baloncesto of the Spanish ACB. In July 2010 he left Real Madrid and joined the Italian club Scavolini Pesaro.

In January 2012, Almond returned to the United States and signed with the Maine Red Claws for the second time. On the 16th of April 2012, the Washington Wizards announced they would be signing Almond to contract for the rest of the 2011–12 season. At the end of the 2011–2012 season he was selected to the All NBA D-League Third Team after averaging 23.4 points and 6.0 rebounds per game for the Red Claws.

Almond briefly played for Crvena zvezda during the 2012–13 season. He then returned to the Maine Red Claws, who traded him to the Iowa Energy.

On January 30, 2013, he and Mike Taylor were traded to the Los Angeles D-Fenders in exchange for Jarrid Famous.

== Post-professional career ==
Almond has since retired from professional basketball. He formed Almond Athletics, a non-profit organization, in 2013.

== NBA career statistics ==
Legend
GP	Games played	GS	Games started	MPG	Minutes per game
FG%	Field goal percentage	3P%	3-point field goal percentage	FT%	Free throw percentage
RPG	Rebounds per game	APG	Assists per game	SPG	Steals per game
BPG	Blocks per game	PPG	Points per game	**Bold**	Career high

=== Regular season ===
Year	Team	GP	GS	MPG	FG%	3P%	FT%	RPG	APG	SPG	BPG	PPG
2007–08	Utah	9	0	4.3	.267	.250	.667	.2	.3	.1	.0	1.4
2008–09	Utah	**25**	**1**	10.2	**.407**	.294	**.808**	1.4	.3	.2	**.2**	**3.7**
2011–12	Washington	4	0	**16.8**	.353	**.333**	.333	**2.0**	**.5**	**1.8**	.0	3.5
Career		38	1	9.5	.381	.292	.743	1.2	.3	.3	.1	3.1
