= Eric Dawson =

American basketball player (born 1984)

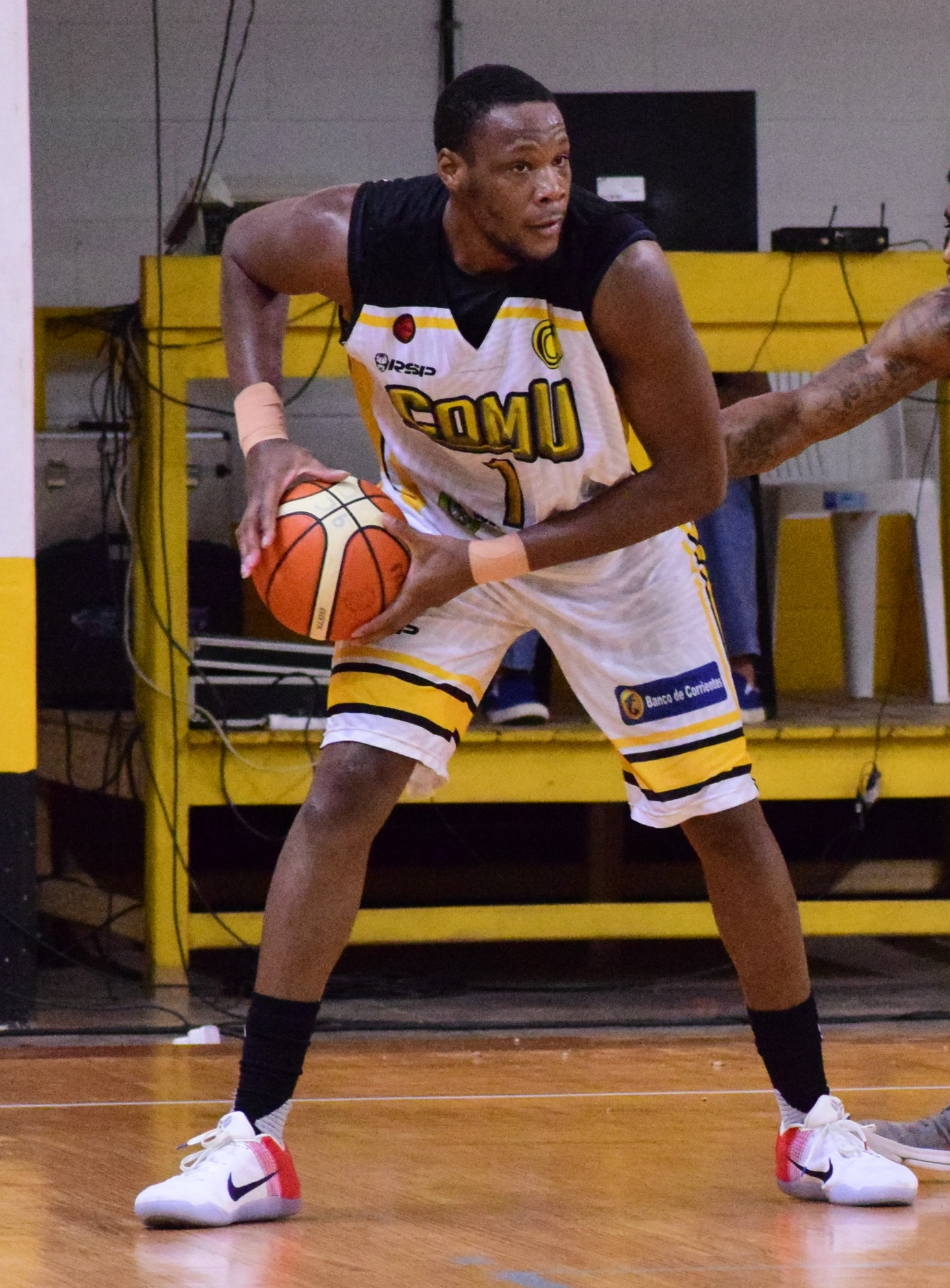
- Dawson with Comunicaciones in 2018

Personal information
- Born: July 7, 1984 (age 42) San Antonio, Texas, U.S.
- Listed height: 6 ft 9 in (2.06 m)
- Listed weight: 250 lb (113 kg)

Career information
- High school: Sam Houston (San Antonio, Texas)
- College: McLennan CC (2003–2005); Midwestern State (2005–2007)
- NBA draft: 2007: undrafted
- Playing career: 2007–2021
- Position: Power forward / center

Career history
- 2007–2009: Austin Toros
- 2008: Marineros de Puerto Plata
- 2009–2010: Mitsubishi Diamond Dolphins
- 2010–2012: Austin Toros
- 2011: Jeonju KCC Egis
- 2012: San Antonio Spurs
- 2013: Meralco Bolts
- 2013: Metros de Santiago
- 2013–2014: Austin Toros
- 2014: Petrochimi Bandar Imam
- 2014: Heilongjiang Fengshen
- 2014–2015: Élan Chalon
- 2015: Leones de Ponce
- 2015–2016: Paris-Levallois
- 2016: Blackwater Elite
- 2016: Salt Lake City Stars
- 2017: Leones de Ponce
- 2018: Comunicaciones
- 2018: Cariduros de Fajardo
- 2018: Vaqueros de Bayamón
- 2018: Olimpia Asuncion
- 2018–2019: Yulon Luxgen Dinos
- 2019: Defensor Sporting
- 2019–2020: Leones de Ponce
- 2020: Mineros de Zacatecas
- 2020: Atléticos de San Germán
- 2021: Dorados de Chihuahua
- 2021: Cariduros de Fajardo

Career highlights
- LNBP East District MVP (2020); BSN All Star (2017); NBA D-League champion (2012); All-NBA D-League Second Team (2012); NBA D-League Impact Player of the Year (2012); Second-team Division II All-American (2007); 2× First-team All-LSC (2006, 2007)
- Stats at NBA.com
- Stats at Basketball Reference

Eric Lamont Dawson (born July 7, 1984) is an American former professional basketball player. He played college basketball for McLennan CC and Midwestern State.

== College career ==
Dawson spent two years at McLennan Community College before transferring to Midwestern State where he averaged 16.6 points and 10.6 rebounds in two seasons and earning All-LSC first-team honors in both seasons. He also was a Basketball Times second-team All American while helping the Mustangs to a conference title and an NCAA regional appearance in his senior season.

== Professional career ==
After going undrafted in the 2007 NBA draft, Dawson signed with the Austin Toros of the NBA Development League on November 1, 2007. On February 4, 2008, he was waived by the Toros after playing two games in an injury plagued. Afterwards, he signed with Marineros of Dominican Republic for the rest of the season.

On November 6, 2008, Dawson re-signed with the Austin Toros. In 30 games, he averaged 10.3 points, 6.6 rebounds, 1.6 assists, 1.1 steals and one block in 24.2 minutes. The next season, he played in Japan for Mitsubishi Diamond Dolphins.

In December, 2010, Dawson re-signed with Austin.

In 29 games with the Austin Toros in the 2011–12 season, Dawson averaged 17.2 points and 10.7 rebounds, shooting 56 percent from the field earning himself the NBA D-League's Impact Player of the Year. He eclipsed previous career highs that he set in the 2008–09 season when he averaged 10.4 points and 6.6 rebounds. With Dawson in the lineup, the Toros put together a record of 19–10, helping them to the league's second best record at 33–17 going into the 2012 NBA D-League Playoffs.

During the 2011–12 season, he played two stints with the San Antonio Spurs of the National Basketball Association (NBA).

The Meralco Bolts of the Philippine Basketball Association selected Dawson as an import for the 2013 Commissioner's Cup. In July 2013, he signed with Metros de Santiago of the Dominican Republic.

In June 2013, Dawson joined the Atlanta Hawks for the 2013 NBA Summer League and on September 30, 2013, he signed with the Hawks. However, he was waived on October 26 after appearing in three preseason games. On October 31, 2013, Dawson was re-acquired by the Austin Toros and averaged 14 points and 9.8 rebounds per game. In March, 2013, Dawson signed with Petrochimi Bandar Imam to play in the final of the WABA League. He was the leading scorer for Petrochimi with 21 points, but lost the title. On April 24, 2014, Dawson signed with Heilongjiang Fengshen of the Chinese NBL where he averaged 32 points, 15.7 rebounds and 3.3 steals per game.

In June 2014, Dawson re-joined joining the Atlanta Hawks for the 2014 NBA Summer League. On August 6, 2014, Dawson signed with Élan Chalon of France for the 2014–15 season. He averaged 11 points and 10 rebounds per game. On June 16, 2015, he signed with the Leones de Ponce of Puerto Rico for the rest of the 2015 BSN season. In 11 games, he averaged 8.5 points, 7.3 rebounds, one assist, one steal and one block.

On September 14, 2015, Dawson signed with Paris-Levallois for the 2015–16 season. He averaged 10.8 points, 6.4 rebounds and 2.4 assists with Paris. On May 30, 2016, he signed with Blackwater Elite for the 2016 PBA Governors' Cup. In six games, he averaged 18.2 points, 15.2 rebounds, 4.7 assists, 2.3 steals and 2.2 blocks in 38.8 minutes per game.

On September 23, 2016, Dawson signed with the Utah Jazz, but was later waived on October 13 after appearing in one preseason game. On October 31, he was acquired by the Salt Lake City Stars of the NBA Development League. On November 26, he was waived by the Stars after suffering a foot injury. He averaged 6.5 points and 10.0 rebounds in 25 minutes. On January 4, 2017, he re-signed with Leones de Ponce.

On December 27, 2017, Dawson signed with Comunicaciones of the Argentinian LNB, averaging 16 points, 13.3 rebounds, 2.3 assists and 1.9 steals in 23 games. On May 13, 2018, he returned to Puerto Rico, this time with Cariduros de Fajardo.

In June 2020. Dawson signs for Mineros de Zacatecas of the Mexican league.

== Career statistics ==
Legend
| GP | Games played | GS | Games started | MPG | Minutes per game |
| FG% | Field goal percentage | 3P% | 3-point field goal percentage | FT% | Free throw percentage |
| RPG | Rebounds per game | APG | Assists per game | SPG | Steals per game |
| BPG | Blocks per game | PPG | Points per game | **Bold** | Career high |

=== NBA ===
| Year | Team | GP | GS | MPG | FG% | 3P% | FT% | RPG | APG | SPG | BPG | PPG |
|---|---|---|---|---|---|---|---|---|---|---|---|---|
| 2011–12 | San Antonio | 4 | 0 | 9.8 | .583 | – | .500 | 2.5 | .0 | .3 | .5 | 3.8 |
| Career | | 4 | 0 | 9.8 | .583 | – | .500 | 2.5 | .0 | .3 | .5 | 3.8 |
