= NBA Development League Impact Player of the Year Award =

Annual NBA Development League award

The NBA Development League Impact Player of the Year was an annual NBA Development League (D-League) award given between the 2007–08 and 2016–17 seasons to the player who joined the D-League mid-season and made the greatest contribution to his team's success following that acquisition. The league's head coaches determined the award by voting and it was usually presented to the honoree during the D-League playoffs.

While no player won Impact Player of the Year more than once, two international players won the award: Ike Diogu of Nigeria in 2014, and John Holland of Puerto Rico in 2017. Morris Almond was the inaugural winner while playing for the Utah Flash. By position, forwards have won the award five times, followed by guards with four. Only one center won, Brian Butch in 2009–10.

== Winners ==
Season	Player	Position	Nationality	Team
2007–08	Morris Almond	Guard	United States	Utah Flash
2008–09	Eddie Gill	Guard	United States	Colorado 14ers
2009–10	Brian Butch	Center	United States	Bakersfield Jam (1)
2010–11	Jeff Adrien	Forward	United States	Rio Grande Valley Vipers
2011–12	Eric Dawson	Forward	United States	Austin Toros
2012–13	Rasual Butler	Forward	United States	Tulsa 66ers
2013–14	Ike Diogu	Forward	Nigeria/ United States	Bakersfield Jam (2)
2014–15	Jerel McNeal	Guard	United States	Bakersfield Jam (3)
2015–16	Ryan Gomes	Forward	United States	Los Angeles D-Fenders
2016–17	John Holland	Guard	United States/ Puerto Rico	Canton Charge
