= Steve Gansey =

American basketball player and coach

Personal information
- Born: October 17, 1985 (age 41) Olmsted Falls, Ohio, U.S.
- Listed height: 6 ft 5 in (1.96 m)
- Listed weight: 195 lb (88 kg)

Career information
- High school: Olmsted Falls (Olmsted Falls, Ohio)
- College: Cleveland State (2004–2006); Ashland (2006–2008)
- NBA draft: 2008: undrafted
- Position: Guard
- Coaching career: 2009–present

Career history

Coaching
- 2009–2011: Fort Wayne Mad Ants (assistant)
- 2011–2012: Fort Wayne Mad Ants (interim HC)
- 2012–2014: Fort Wayne Mad Ants (assistant)
- 2014–2015: Canton Charge (associate HC)
- 2015–2020: Fort Wayne Mad Ants
- 2021–2023: College Park Skyhawks

Career highlights
- As assistant coach: NBA D-League champion (2014)

Steve Gansey (born October 17, 1985) is an American former basketball player and coach. He attended Cleveland State and Ashland University.

== Playing career ==
Steve Gansey played NCAA Division II basketball for the Ashland Eagles, after playing his freshman and sophomore years with the Division I Cleveland State Vikings.

== Coaching career ==
Steve Gansey began his coaching career with the Fort Wayne Mad Ants from 2009 to 2014, he served as an assistant coach. From 2011 to 2012 he served as interim head coach.

On October 2, 2015, he was named the head coach of the Fort Wayne Mad Ants after serving as the associate head coach of the Canton Charge.

In 2021, he was named the head coach of the College Park Skyhawks, the NBA G League affiliate of the Atlanta Hawks.

== Career stats ==
=== Coaching ===
Legend
Regular season	G	Games coached	W	Games won	L	Games lost	W–L %	Win–loss %
Playoffs	PG	Playoff games	PW	Playoff wins	PL	Playoff losses	PW–L %	Playoff win–loss %

NBA G League coaching record
Team	Year	G	W	L	W–L%	Finish	PG	PW	PL	PW–L%	Result
Fort Wayne	2011–12	35	9	26	.257	8th in Eastern	—	—	—	—	Missed Playoffs
Fort Wayne	2015–16	50	20	30	.400	5th in Central	—	—	—	—	Missed Playoffs
Fort Wayne	2016–17	50	30	20	.600	2nd in Central	3	1	2	.333	Lost First Round (Maine) 1–2
Fort Wayne	2017–18	50	29	21	.580	1st in Central	1	0	1	.000	Lost Conf. Semifinal (Erie) 116–119
Fort Wayne	2018–19	50	23	27	.460	3rd in Central	—	—	—	—	Missed Playoffs
Fort Wayne	2019–20	43	21	22	.488	4th in Central	—	—	—	—	Season cancelled by COVID-19 pandemic
Career		278	132	146	.475		4	1	3	.250	

== Personal life ==
Steve's older brother Mike, a former star player at West Virginia University, is currently the President of Basketball Operations with the NBA's Philadelphia 76ers.
