= Rahsool Diggins =

American basketball player (born 2002)

Free agent
- Position: Guard

Personal information
- Born: March 27, 2002 (age 24) Philadelphia, Pennsylvania, U.S.
- Listed height: 6 ft 2 in (1.88 m)
- Listed weight: 185 lb (84 kg)

Career information
- High school: Archbishop Wood (Warminster, Pennsylvania)
- College: UConn (2021–2022); UMass (2022–2025)
- NBA draft: 2025: undrafted
- Playing career: 2025–present

Career history
- 2025–2026: Maine Celtics
- 2026: Grand Rapids Gold

Rahsool Nafis Diggins Jr. (born March 27, 2002) is an American professional basketball player who last played for the Grand Rapids Gold of the NBA G League. Diggins played college basketball for the UConn Huskies and UMass Minutemen.

== College career ==
=== UConn ===
In July 2020, Diggins, the No. 41 recruit in the country and a 4-star recruit, announced his commitment to the University of Connecticut. He received 21 Division I offers coming out of high school.

Diggins began his college basketball career with the UConn Huskies in 2021. As a freshman with the Huskies, Diggins appeared in 9 games and averaged 0.8 points per game.

=== UMass ===
Diggins transferred to the UMass Minutemen for his sophomore season. As a sophomore, he appeared in 26 games and averaged 4.7 points per game.

As a junior with UMass, Diggins had a breakout season, starting in all 31 games for the Minutemen and averaging a career-high 12.8 points per game, 2.4 rebounds per game, and career-highs in FG% and 3P%. After his junior season he was named the 2023-24 Atlantic-10 Conference Most Improved Player.

As a senior, Diggins started all 32 games he appeared in and averaged a career-high 16.8 points per game at UMass. He was named to the 2024-25 All-A-10 team. On January 15, 2025, in a game against the Fordham Rams, Diggins set the UMass program single-game scoring record with 46 points in a 3OT win.

== Professional career ==
On November 6, 2025, Diggins was named to the Maine Celtics opening night roster.

On November 12, 2025, Diggins made his NBA G League debut against the Raptors 905, appearing for 14 minutes and scoring 4 points.
