= Eddie Gill =

American basketball player (born 1978)

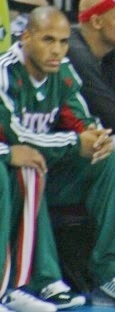
- Gill with the Milwaukee Bucks in 2009

Personal information
- Born: August 16, 1978 (age 47) Aurora, Colorado, U.S.
- Listed height: 6 ft 0 in (1.83 m)
- Listed weight: 190 lb (86 kg)

Career information
- High school: Overland (Aurora, Colorado)
- College: USU Eastern (1996–1997); Salt Lake CC (1997–1998); Weber State (1998–2000)
- NBA draft: 2000: undrafted
- Playing career: 2000–2012
- Position: Point guard
- Number: 8, 7, 4, 6

Career history
- 2000–2001: Las Vegas Silver Bandits
- 2000–2001: Kansas City Knights
- 2000–2001: New Jersey Nets
- 2000–2001: Paf Bologna
- 2001–2002: Kansas City Knights
- 2001–2002: Memphis Grizzlies
- 2002–2003: Asheville Altitude
- 2003: Reggio Emilia
- 2003: Ionikos N.F. B.C.
- 2003–2004: Dakota Wizards
- 2004: Portland Trail Blazers
- 2004–2006: Indiana Pacers
- 2006–2007: Dynamo Moscow
- 2007–2008: New Jersey Nets
- 2007–2008: Colorado 14ers
- 2007–2008: Seattle SuperSonics
- 2007–2008: Colorado 14ers
- 2008–2009: Milwaukee Bucks
- 2009–2010: Oostende
- 2010–2011: EWE Baskets Oldenburg
- 2011–2012: Townsville Crocodiles

Career highlights
- All-NBL Third Team (2012); Belgian Cup champion (2010); NBA D-League champion (2009); NBA D-League All-Star (2008); All-NBA D-League First Team (2008); All-NBA D-League Third Team (2009); NBA D-League Impact Player of the Year (2009); CBA All-Star (2004); 2× First-team All-Big Sky (1999, 2000); Big Sky tournament MVP (1999)
- Stats at NBA.com
- Stats at Basketball Reference

Edward Gill III (born August 16, 1978) is an American former professional basketball player. Gill played college basketball at the College of Eastern Utah, Salt Lake Community College, and Weber State University. With the Weber State Wildcats, Gill was MVP of the 1999 Big Sky Conference tournament.

Not selected in the 2000 NBA draft, Gill began his professional career with the Las Vegas Silver Bandits of the IBL and debuted with the New Jersey Nets of the NBA late in the 2000–01 season. Gill has had a journeyman career in basketball and has played in various teams in the NBA, NBA Development League, minor leagues, and overseas. In the NBA, Gill has played for the New Jersey Nets, Memphis Grizzlies, Portland Trail Blazers, Indiana Pacers, Seattle SuperSonics, and Milwaukee Bucks all usually in reserve roles. However, Gill has been a starter and high scorer for much of his non-NBA career. Professionally, Gill has been an All-Star selection in the CBA (2004) and NBA Development League (2008) and won championships with the D-League (2009 with the Colorado 14ers) and Belgian Cup (2010 with BC Oostende).

Won a regional Emmy award for his work as an analyst on Pacers Live Pregame.

== Early life and college ==
Gill was born in Aurora, Colorado, and graduated from Overland High School in 1996. After high school, Gill enrolled at the College of Eastern Utah, a junior college in Price, Utah, and played on the basketball team, averaging 6.1 points and 2.4 assists. In 1997, Gill transferred to Salt Lake Community College and again played basketball. At Salt Lake CC, Gill had 16.4 points, 4.2 rebounds, and 6.4 assists per game.

Gill transferred to Weber State University in 1998 and played for two seasons on the Weber State Wildcats men's basketball team. In his junior year (1998–1999), Gill averaged 14.0 points, 3.9 rebounds, and 4.5 assists. For the 1999 Big Sky Conference men's basketball tournament, Gill was MVP after scoring 15 points and making 9 assists and 6 rebounds in 40 minutes of play. He also only committed two of his team's five turnovers in the 82–75 victory over Northern ArizonaI despite playing 40 minutes. This tournament championship qualified Weber State for an automatic NCAA tournament bid. In the Round of 64 game, 14th-seeded Weber State upset third-seeded North Carolina 76–74. Gill scored 16 points despite only making 4 of 12 field goals; he also made 5 of 5 free throws and had 2 assists and 5 defensive rebounds. In Weber State's next round loss to sixth-seeded Florida, Gill scored 19 points in 5-for-14 shooting and 7-for-8 free throw shooting and also made 3 defensive rebounds and 5 assists. Weber State finished the season 25–8.

As a senior (1999–2000), Gill averaged 16.3 points, 6.4 rebounds, and 6.9 assists. In both seasons, Gill earned First-Team All-Big Sky Conference honors.

== Professional career ==
=== Las Vegas Silver Bandits, Kansas City Knights, New Jersey Nets, and Italy (2000–2001) ===
Not selected in the 2000 NBA draft, Gill began his professional career with the Las Vegas Silver Bandits of the IBL. In 31 games with Las Vegas, Gill averaged 14.1 points, 4.2 rebounds, and 6.9 assists. Gill then played in 10 games with the Kansas City Knights of the ABA and averaged 6 points and 9 assists. On March 29, 2001, Gill signed a 10-day contract with the NBA's New Jersey Nets and would sign another 10-day contract afterwards. Playing in a game against the Boston Celtics on April 15, 2001, Gill scored the eight millionth point in NBA history. With New Jersey, Gill averaged 4.9 points, 1.1 rebounds, 3.0 assists, and 1.3 turnovers in 8 games. He made 39% of field goals. Gill joined the Italian Lega Basket Serie A team Paf Bologna in April 2001.

=== Return to Kansas City and Memphis Grizzlies (2001–2002) ===
Returning to the Kansas City Knights in fall 2001, Gill played in 18 games and averaged 12.1 points, 4.9 rebounds, and 6.7 assists. Gill signed with the Memphis Grizzlies for a 10-day contract on February 23, 2002, and later signed for the rest of the 2001–02 season. Gill played 23 games with Memphis and started 5. He averaged 5.0 points, 1.2 rebounds, 2.1 assists, and 1.5 turnovers. In a game that used only eight players, Gill scored 20 points in his debut with Memphis on February 25, a 90–77 loss to the Los Angeles Clippers. Gill made 7 of 12 field goals (including 1 of 2 three-pointers) and made all 5 free throw attempts. He also had 5 rebounds, 7 assists, and a steal. Gill would score in double figures in only three other games: 11 on March 3 against Seattle, 11 on March 4 against Atlanta, and 10 on March 7 against Indiana.

=== D-League and Italy (2002–2003) ===
Gill signed with NBA Development League team Asheville Altitude on November 23, 2002, and was waived on February 24, 2003. Gill played 35 games with Asheville and averaged 12.5 points and 5.2 assists. Gill later signed with Reggio Emilia of the Italian league Legadue Basket and averaged 14.1 points and 2.9 rebounds in 13 games.

=== Greek League, CBA, and return to NBA (2003–2004) ===
In the beginning of the 2003–04 season, Gill played with Greek Basket League team Ionikos Athens. In six games, Gill averaged 15.8 points and 3.7 assists. He later played in 25 games for the Dakota Wizards of the CBA and averaged 18.1 points and 8.0 assists. In the CBA All-Star Classic on January 20, Gill helped the National team rally from a 20-point deficit to a 2-point win with 15 points, 6 assists, 10 rebounds, and 3 steals. Gill returned to the NBA on February 5, 2004, by signing as a free agent with the Portland Trail Blazers. In 22 games, Gill averaged 2.3 points, 0.8 rebounds, and 0.7 assists.

=== Indiana Pacers (2004–2006) ===
On June 24, 2004, Portland traded Eddie Gill to the New Jersey Nets, but the Nets waived Gill on July 6. Gill signed as a free agent with the Indiana Pacers on July 28. In the infamous game on November 19, 2004, that concluded with the Pacers–Pistons brawl, Gill joined two of his Pacers teammates and others in an effort to break up a fight between players and fans. The following day, Gill started the game and was one of only six players used due to the suspensions from the brawl the night before. In Indiana's 86–83 loss to Orlando on November 20, Gill made 3 of 10 field goals (including 1 of 1 three-point attempt), converted 1 of 2 free throws, and had 8 points, 1 rebound, 3 assists, 3 steals, and a turnover. Gill played in 73 games in 2004–05 and had 3 starts in the 2004–05 season for the Pacers and averaged 3.7 points, 1.5 rebounds, and 1.1 assists. Gill scored a season-high 21 points on December 1 against the Los Angeles Clippers. Gill made his postseason debut on April 23, 2005, in the Pacers' first first-round playoff game against the Boston Celtics. Gill made one field goal out of four attempts and made two free throws; in 17 minutes of play he scored 4 points and made 2 rebounds, 2 assists, a steal, and 2 turnovers. In the 2005–06 season with Indiana, Gill played only 41 games an averaged 1.1 points, 0.4 rebounds, and 0.3 assists.

=== Dynamo Moscow (2006–2007) ===
For the 2006–07 season, Gill again played overseas, for Dynamo Moscow of Russian Basketball Super League. He averaged 7.3 points and 2.5 assists in 33 Russian League games and 6.2 points and 1.4 assists in 20 Euroleague games.

=== Return to the Nets and D-League, Seattle SuperSonics (2007–2008) ===
On October 1, 2007, Gill signed with the New Jersey Nets but was waived on October 25. The Colorado 14ers drafted Gill as the top pick in the 2007 NBA Development League Draft. Due to a thigh injury to Darrell Armstrong, the Nets re-signed Gill on November 16. With New Jersey, Gill averaged 2.9 points, 1.7 rebounds, and 1.6 assists before the Nets waived him on December 12. In his short stint, Gill had two games in double figures: 12 points on 4-for-5 shooting on November 19 against Utah and 10 points on December 4 against Cleveland. Gill also started the December 5 game against New York. Gill returned to the Colorado 14ers on December 17. In 37 games with Colorado, Gill averaged 18.0 points, 5.1 rebounds, and 8.5 assists. In the 2008 NBA D-League All-Star Game on February 16, Gill played on the Red Team and scored 3 points off one three-pointer but missed 6 other field goals. He also had 3 rebounds, 7 assists, and 2 turnovers. The Blue Team won 117–99 over Red.

On March 24, 2008, the Seattle SuperSonics signed Gill to a ten-day contract, due to a depleted lineup. He played only 5 minutes against the Portland Trail Blazers in his first game on March 24. On April 3, his contract expired and was not renewed.

=== Return to Colorado 14ers, call-up to Milwaukee Bucks (2009) ===
He signed with the New Jersey Nets in the 2008 offseason but was waived, among with 3 other players, before the season started (October 24). He had averaged 4.5 points and 1 assist in six preseason games. Gill returned to the Colorado 14ers on December 8.

The Milwaukee Bucks, facing a depleted roster due to injuries, signed Gill to a 10-day contract on February 9, 2009. He signed a second 10-day contract on February 20. In 6 games for the Bucks he averaged 2.8 points and 1.8 assists in 7.2 minutes per game. This call-up to Milwaukee would end up being Gill's final days in the NBA, as his final NBA game was played on February 25, 2009, in a 96–116 loss to the Dallas Mavericks. In his final game, Gill played for 5 and half minutes and recorded 2 assists and 1 rebound.

In 40 games with Colorado, Gill averaged 14.8 points, 3.9 rebounds, 8.4 assists, and 1.6 steals. D-League coaches voted Gill as Player of the Year at the end of the season. In Game 1 of the D-League finals on April 21, Gill made the tying free throw to force overtime, and Colorado beat the Utah Flash 136–131 in overtime. Colorado won the D-League title in Game Two on April 23.

=== BC Oostende (2009–2010) ===
In November 2009, Gill signed with the Basketball League Belgium team BC Oostende and in 26 games averaged 7 points, 3. rebounds, 4.3 assists, and 2.2 steals with 28.0% field goal shooting. On February 19, 2010, during a late 12–4 run by Oostende, Gill made five free throws in the last two minutes to seal a 75–68 win over the Antwerp Giants. Oostende won the Belgian Cup championship for the season.

=== EWE Baskets Oldenburg (2010–2011) ===
On September 24, 2010, he signed with the New Jersey Nets of the NBA but was waived on October 6, 2010. On December 6, 2010, Gill signed with German team EWE Baskets Oldenburg for the remainder of the 2010–11 season. Gill played in 27 league games and averaged 7.1 points, 2.2 rebounds, 3.4 assists, and 1.4 steals with 40.9% field goals made. In 2 Eurocup games, Gill averaged 5 points, 1 rebound, 4 assists, and 1.5 steals.

=== Townsville Crocodiles (2011–2012) ===
On July 15, 2011, Gill signed with the Townsville Crocodiles of the Australian NBL for the 2011–12 season. In the 28 games of the regular season he averaged 12.9 points, 3.2 rebounds, 3.9 assists and 1.4 steals in 29 minutes per game. Gill scored 21 in an October blowout 95–67 win over the Cairns Taipans. On November 11, Gill led Townsville with 30 points and seven assists in Townsville's 95–88 overtime upset of the Melbourne Tigers; with 2 seconds left in regulation, Gill made the tying free throw. With 73% field goals made, Gill scored 26 in a 100–93 win over the Sydney Kings on December 23. Against doctor's orders, Gill played on March 4, 2012, with 15 stitches in his right hand. He had 4 points, 3 assists, and 7 turnovers but drew a last-second charging foul to seal Townsville's three-point victory over the Melbourne Tigers.

Gill won the NBL Player of the Week twice, in rounds 6 and 12, and was also named to the 2011–12 All-NBL Third Team.

The Crocodiles made it to the 2011–12 NBL playoffs, finishing in fourth position overall for the regular season with a win–loss record of 15–13 (54.57%). On Friday 30 March 2012, the Crocodiles scored an upset 99–82 win over the New Zealand Breakers in the first game of the 2011–12 NBL postseason competition. Gill scored 21 points, 4 steals, and 3 rebounds in the win.

Gill signed with the Milwaukee Bucks on October 1 but was waived before the regular season on October 27. In three preseason games, Gill had limited playing time and made 0 of 4 field goals in one game.

== Personal life ==
Eddie Gill is married to Marisa and has two children: Eddie IV (born 2000) and Kiara (born 2002). Gill and his family have lived in Zionsville, Indiana, since 2005. Since 2016, he has served as a studio analyst for Pacers games on FOX Sports Indiana.

== NBA career statistics ==
Legend
GP	Games played	GS	Games started	MPG	Minutes per game
FG%	Field goal percentage	3P%	3-point field goal percentage	FT%	Free throw percentage
RPG	Rebounds per game	APG	Assists per game	SPG	Steals per game
BPG	Blocks per game	PPG	Points per game	**Bold**	Career high

=== Regular season ===
Year	Team	GP	GS	MPG	FG%	3P%	FT%	RPG	APG	SPG	BPG	PPG
2000–01	New Jersey	8	0	**19.0**	.390	.333	.800	1.1	**3.0**	0.5	0.1	4.9
2001–02	Memphis	23	**5**	16.7	.424	.318	.795	1.2	2.1	0.5	0.1	**5.0**
2003–04	Portland	22	0	7.1	.417	.375	.850	0.8	0.7	0.4	0.0	2.3
2004–05	Indiana	**73**	3	14.0	.335	.308	.877	1.5	1.1	**0.8**	0.1	3.7
2005–06	Indiana	41	0	3.0	.222	.304	.783	0.4	0.3	0.3	0.0	1.1
2007–08	New Jersey	13	1	11.5	.414	.357	**1.000**	**1.7**	1.6	0.5	**0.2**	2.9
2007–08	Seattle	1	0	5.0	.000	.000	–	0.0	1.0	0.0	0.0	0.0
2008–09	Milwaukee	6	0	7.2	**.667**	**.667**	–	0.7	1.8	0.5	**0.2**	2.3
Career		187	9	10.9	.361	.320	.847	1.1	1.2	0.6	0.1	3.1

=== Playoffs ===
Year	Team	GP	GS	MPG	FG%	3P%	FT%	RPG	APG	SPG	BPG	PPG
2005	Indiana	**7**	0	**6.4**	**.313**	**.167**	**.876**	**0.6**	**0.7**	**0.1**	0.0	**3.4**
2006	Indiana	2	0	0.5	–	–	–	0.0	0.0	0.0	0.0	0.0
Career		9	0	5.1	.313	.167	.867	0.4	0.6	0.1	0.0	2.7
