= Bob MacKinnon Jr. =

American basketball coach (born 1960)

Raleigh Firebirds
- Position: Head coach
- League: The Basketball League

Personal information
- Born: September 24, 1960 (age 66) Buffalo, New York, U.S.

Career information
- College: King's College (1978–1982)

Career history

Coaching
- 1982: King's College (assistant)
- 1982-1985: Mercyhurst (assistant)
- 1985–1990: George Washington (assistant)
- 1990–1997: Niagara (assistant / assoc. HC)
- 1997–1999: Merchant Marine
- 1999–2000: Notre Dame (assistant)
- 2000–2003: North Carolina (assistant)
- 2003–2008: Marshall (assistant)
- 2008–2009: Colorado 14ers
- 2009–2010: Idaho Stampede
- 2010–2011: Tianjin Ronggang
- 2011–2013: Springfield Armor
- 2013–2014: Los Angeles D-Fenders
- 2016–2019: Texas Legends
- 2022–present: Raleigh Firebirds

Career highlights
- NBA D-League champion (2009); Skyline Coach of the Year (1999)

Robert Charles MacKinnon Jr. (born September 24, 1960) is an American basketball coach. He is the interim head coach of the Raleigh Firebirds of The Basketball League.

Previously, he served as the head coach of the Colorado 14ers, Springfield Armor, Los Angeles D-Fenders, and Texas Legends in the NBA G League.

== Coaching career ==
Mackinnon began his coaching career in 1982 as an assistant coach for his alma mater King's College. He then had stints as an assistant coach at several different colleges and universities including Mercyhurst College, George Washington University, University of Notre Dame and University of North Carolina. He was also head coach at the United States Merchant Marine Academy for two seasons during which he led the team to the NCAA Tournament Division III tournament twice and won coach of the year in 1999. Beginning in 2008, he was a head coach mostly in the NBA D-League/G League except for one season in China.

== Personal life ==
Mackinnon's father Bob MacKinnon (December 5, 1927 – July 7, 2015) was an American collegiate and professional basketball coach. He coached three different professional teams in his career: the American Basketball Association's Spirits of St. Louis, and the NBA's Buffalo Braves and New Jersey Nets. He also served as the Nets' general manager. He died in Williamsville, New York on July 7, 2015, at the age of 87. Mackinnon Jr. also has four sisters.
