= Anthony Mason Jr. =

American basketball player

Personal information
- Born: January 25, 1987 (age 39) Miami, Florida, U.S.
- Listed height: 6 ft 7 in (2.01 m)
- Listed weight: 213 lb (97 kg)

Career information
- High school: Fairley (Memphis, Tennessee)
- College: St. John's (2005–2010)
- NBA draft: 2010: undrafted
- Playing career: 2011–2015
- Position: Power forward

Career history
- 2011–2012: Sioux Falls Skyforce
- 2012–2013: Capo d'Orlando
- 2013: Guaros de Lara
- 2013–2014: Sioux Falls Skyforce
- 2014–2015: Apollon Limassol

Anthony G. Mason Jr. (born January 25, 1987) is an American former professional basketball player in the United States and France. He is from Memphis, Tennessee.

== Personal life ==
Mason's father, Anthony Mason was a basketball player for the New York Knicks. Mason currently operates a charity called Family One, Two, Three. His brother Antoine, was a standout basketball player at Niagara University.

== Basketball ==
Mason, played on the St. John's University Red Storm basketball team. He completed his eligibility for the 2009–10 St. John's Red Storm, and he went on to try out with the Miami Heat, before playing for teams such as the Sioux Falls Skyforce. In the NBDL, he averaged 16.7 points per game.
