= Texas Legends =

American professional basketball team of the NBA G League

- Conference: Western
- League: NBA G League
- Founded: 2006
- History: Colorado 14ers 2006–2009; Texas Legends; 2010–present
- Arena: Comerica Center
- Location: Frisco, Texas
- Team colors: Royal blue, navy blue, silver, white
- General manager: Terry Sullivan
- Head coach: Max Hooper
- Ownership: Dallas Mavericks
- Affiliation: Dallas Mavericks
- Championships: 1 (2009)
- Conference titles: 1 (2009)
- Division titles: 1 (2009)
- Website: texas.gleague.nba.com

The Texas Legends are an American professional basketball team in the NBA G League based in Frisco, Texas. They are affiliated with the Dallas Mavericks, and play their home games at the Comerica Center. The team began as the Colorado 14ers in 2006, before relocating to Frisco in 2009 and becoming the Texas Legends for the 2010–11 season.

== Franchise history ==
=== Colorado 14ers ===
In 2006, Colorado businessmen Tim Wiens and John Frew, who were building the Broomfield Event Center at the Arista development in Broomfield, Colorado, acquired a new minor league basketball team to attract fans in the northwest Denver-Boulder region. In February, they formed two teams, the minor league hockey team Rocky Mountain Rage, and the Colorado 14ers, originally a Continental Basketball Association club. In April, the 14ers entered the NBA Development League and began their first season. The team was named after Colorado's 14,000-foot mountain peaks.

==== 2006–07 season ====
Joe Wolf, who played with the Denver Nuggets in the 1990s, was the 14ers' first coach, and put together the roster. The team won 28–22 in its first season, and broke various records for Colorado minor league basketball, from scoring to attendance. The team's leaders included Von Wafer and Louis Amundson, who joined the NBA by the end of the season. Despite losing streaks and roster reorganizations, the team qualified for the playoffs. The 14ers won the Western Division before losing the championship in overtime to the Dakota Wizards.

==== 2007–08 season ====
The 14ers' second season began with an almost new roster, with only Elton Brown and Eric Osmundson staying. New players included Kaniel Dickens, a top player on the team. Eddie Gill was selected in the draft, joined the NBA before the first game, and returned to the team later. Kevin Hill, the only Canadian, was drafted. Five others joined the NBA, including the simultaneous call-ups of Dickens and Billy Thomas on February 22, 2008, by the Cleveland Cavaliers. Despite turnover, the 14ers played well, finishing with one more win than the prior season. The 14ers' six consecutive wins at the end of the season put them in the playoffs as a wild card, but they lost in the first round to the Los Angeles D-Fenders.

==== 2008–09 season ====
The 14ers' third season had the most consecutive seasons played by any minor league basketball franchise in Colorado. The season began with financial issues for the owners and a new coach, Robert MacKinnon. Joe Wolf had moved to the NBA. The new roster included Eddie Gill, Billy Thomas, and Jamar Brown, who had played for the Colorado Crossover. New players, Dominique Coleman and Josh Davis, played well, as did Sonny Weems, assigned from the Denver Nuggets three times to play during the regular season and playoffs. Early in the season, the 14ers led the D-League in wins and set the D-League record for points in a single game with a 147–119 win over the Rio Grande Valley Vipers on March 10. The 14ers later broke that record with a 155–127 win over the Albuquerque Thunderbirds on April 8. Finishing with a record of 34 wins, the 14ers played at home for the playoffs, and defeated the Erie BayHawks, Austin Toros, and Utah Flash to become the D-League champions.

=== Texas Legends ===
On June 18, 2009, a Dallas Mavericks executive, Donnie Nelson, purchased the 14ers, and moved the team to Frisco, Texas. They played in 2010–11 with a new nickname, color, and logo. On November 5, 2009, women's basketball pioneer Nancy Lieberman became the Legends' head coach, the first woman to lead a men's professional basketball team. The team played in the 2010–11 season out of the Comerica Center. The Legends hired other notable basketball professionals for their front office, including 1986 Slam Dunk Champion Spud Webb as president of basketball operations and 1995 NBA Coach of the Year Del Harris as general manager.

Televised games introduced the Legends to fans of the 16-team league. They were on national TV during Versus three times, and appeared twice on Fox Sports Southwest. The game against the Rio Grande Valley Vipers on Versus was their first TV appearance. After dropping the opener, the Legends had their first win on November 26 against the Idaho Stampede, scoring 108–100. The Legends' first game in Frisco was on November 30. The Legends scored a league record of 84 points in the first half, and a 135–112 win over the Austin Toros. They began the season with a 5–1 record, the best six-game start for an expansion team in the league's history. They finished the regular season with a 24–26 record, and went to the playoffs. They were the third expansion team to play in the postseason, but were eliminated in the first round by the Tulsa 66ers.

After Nancy Lieberman, Del Harris was the head coach, starting October 4, 2011. He coached the Legends for one season, had a 24–26 record for the second consecutive year, but did not make the playoffs. Between 2012 and 2015, the Legends' head coach was former NBA player Eduardo Nájera. The team did not make the playoffs while he was head coach. On July 8, 2015, the Legends hired Nick Van Exel as the head coach. After one season, in June 2016, Exel left to be an assistant coach for the Memphis Grizzlies. He was replaced by Bob MacKinnon Jr., who had previously been the head coach when the 14ers won a D-League championship in Colorado.

== Ownership ==
At first, the team was owned by Texas D-League Management, LLC, which was principally owned by Donnie Nelson, former general manager and President of Basketball Operations for the Dallas Mavericks and son of former NBA head coach Don Nelson. The ownership group also included Evan Wyly, Barry Aycock and Eduardo Nájera. Currently, the team is owned and operated by the Dallas Mavericks.

== Season by season ==
Season	Division / Conference	Finish	Wins	Losses	Win%	Playoffs
Colorado 14ers
2006–07	Western	2nd	28	22	.560	Won First Round (Albuquerque) 130–100; Won Second Round (Idaho) 94–91 (OT); Lost D-League Finals (Dakota) 121–129 (OT)
2007–08	Southwest	2nd	29	21	.580	Lost Semifinals (Los Angeles) 95–102
2008–09	Southwest	1st	34	16	.680	Won First Round (Erie) 129–108; Won Second Round (Austin) 114–111; Won D-League Finals (Utah) 2–0
Texas Legends
2009–10	Did not play					
2010–11	Western	6th	24	26	.480	Lost First Round (Tulsa) 1–2
2011–12	Western	4th	24	26	.480	
2012–13	Central	5th	21	29	.420	
2013–14	Central	4th	24	26	.480	
2014–15	Southwest	4th	22	28	.440	
2015–16	Southwest	3rd	23	27	.460	
2016–17	Southwest	5th	25	25	.500	
2017–18	Southwest	3rd	29	21	.580	Lost First Round (Rio Grande Valley) 100–107
2018–19	Southwest	4th	16	34	.320	
2019–20	Southwest	3rd	24	19	.558	Season cancelled by COVID-19 pandemic
2020–21	Opted out of single-site season					
2021–22	Western	5th	19	15	.559	Won Conference Quarterfinal (Birmingham) 115–110; Lost Conference Semifinal (Rio Grande Valley) 103–120
2022–23	Western	15th	7	25	.219	
2023–24	Western	10th	18	16	.529	
2024–25	Western	14th	8	26	.235	
Regular season			375	402	.483	
Playoffs			8	6	.571	

== Players ==
=== Current roster ===
Texas Legends roster
Players

Pos.	No.	Player	Height	Weight	DOB	From
G	2	Mark Armstrong	6 ft 2 in (1.88 m)	180 lb (82 kg)	2004-02-21	Villanova
F	3	Matt Cross	6 ft 7 in (2.01 m)	230 lb (104 kg)	2001-02-21	SMU
G	13	Sheldon Edwards	6 ft 4 in (1.93 m)	190 lb (86 kg)	2000-08-13	Loyola Chicago
G	10	Jack Gohlke	6 ft 3 in (1.91 m)	215 lb (98 kg)	1999-12-03	Oakland
G	–	Jett Howard (TW)	6 ft 8 in (2.03 m)	215 lb (98 kg)	2003-09-14	Michigan
G	14	Miles Kelly	6 ft 4 in (1.93 m)	190 lb (86 kg)	2003-01-26	Auburn
F	–	Tobi Lawal (TW)	6 ft 8 in (2.03 m)	215 lb (98 kg)	2003-05-01	Virginia Tech
G	1	John Poulakidas (TW)	6 ft 6 in (1.98 m)	205 lb (93 kg)	2003-04-04	Yale

Coaches
Head coach
- Jordan Sears
Assistant(s)
- Cam Black
- Tevin Brown
- Kaleb Canales (associate HC)
- Parker Hines

Legend
- (DP) Unsigned draft pick
- (FA) Free agent
- (S) Suspended
- (P) Prospects
- (NBA) On assignment from NBA affiliate
- (TW) Two-way affiliate player
- Injured

Roster
Updated: March 4, 2026

== Awards ==
Impact Player of the Year

- Eddie Gill – 2009

Rookie of the Year

- Lou Amundson – 2007

Sportsmanship Award

- Billy Thomas – 2008

All-D-League First Team

- Lou Amundson – 2007
- Elton Brown – 2007
- Von Wafer – 2007
- Eddie Gill – 2008
- Joe Alexander – 2011

All-D-League Second Team

- Kaniel Dickens – 2008
- Josh Davis – 2009
- James Nunnally – 2014

All-D-League Third Team

- Billy Thomas (2008)
- Eddie Gill (2009)
- Antonio Daniels (2011)
- Sean Williams – 2011, 2012
- Eric Griffin – 2015

== Head coaches ==
#	Head coach	Term	Regular season				Playoffs				Achievements
#	Head coach	Term	G	W	L	Win%	G	W	L	Win%	Achievements
1	Joe Wolf	2006–2008	100	57	43	.570	4	2	2	.500	
2	Bob MacKinnon Jr.	2008–2009; 2016–2019	200	104	96	.520	5	4	1	.800	D-League Championship: 2009
3	Nancy Lieberman	2010–2011	50	24	26	.480	3	1	2	.333	First woman to head coach a professional men's basketball team.
4	Del Harris	2011–2012	50	24	26	.480	—	—	—	—	
5	Eduardo Nájera	2012–2015	150	67	83	.447	—	—	—	—	First Mexican-born head coach in the NBA system.
6	Nick Van Exel	2015–2016	50	23	27	.460	—	—	—	—	
7	Coach George Galanopoulos	2019–2023	109	50	59	.459	1	1	1	.500	
8	Jordan Sears	2023–2025	67	26	41	.388	–	–	–	–	
9	Max Hooper	2025–2026				–	–	–	–	–	
10	Nate Mitchell	2026–present				–	–	–	–	–	

== NBA affiliates ==
=== Texas Legends ===
- Dallas Mavericks (2010–present)

=== Colorado 14ers ===
- Denver Nuggets (2006–2009)
- New Jersey Nets (2006–2009)
- Toronto Raptors (2006–2008)
