= Grand Rapids Gold =

American professional basketball team

- Conference: Eastern
- League: NBA G League
- Founded: 2006
- History: Anaheim Arsenal; 2006–2009; Springfield Armor; 2009–2014; Grand Rapids Drive; 2014–2021; Grand Rapids Gold; 2021–present
- Arena: Van Andel Arena
- Location: Grand Rapids, Michigan
- Team colors: Midnight blue, sunshine yellow, Flatirons red, white
- President: Steve Jbara
- Head coach: Ryan Bowen
- Ownership: SSJ Group
- Affiliation: Denver Nuggets
- Championships: 0
- Conference titles: 0
- Division titles: 2 (2012, 2019)
- Website: grandrapids.gleague.nba.com

The Grand Rapids Gold are an American professional basketball team in the NBA G League based in Grand Rapids, Michigan. They are affiliated with the Denver Nuggets, and play their home games at Van Andel Arena. They began play as the Anaheim Arsenal in 2006, before relocating to Springfield, Massachusetts, in 2009, becoming the Springfield Armor. After five seasons in Springfield, the franchise moved to Grand Rapids in 2014 and were subsequently renamed the Grand Rapids Drive, before changing their name again to the Gold in 2021.

== Franchise history ==
=== 2006–2009: Anaheim Arsenal ===
The franchise began in 2006 as the Anaheim Arsenal as an expansion team in the NBA Development League (NBA D-League). Based in Anaheim, California, and playing at the Anaheim Convention Center, the Arsenal were an affiliate of the Atlanta Hawks, Los Angeles Clippers, Orlando Magic and Portland Trail Blazers. However, the Arsenal era was mainly marked by futility, never having a winning season or a playoff berth. On March 31, 2009, the Arsenal announced that they would relocate to Springfield, Massachusetts.

=== 2009–2014: Springfield Armor ===
On July 29, 2009, it was announced that Dee Brown would become the head coach. On September 2, the Armor picked first in the 2009 NBA Development League expansion draft, selecting center Marcus Campbell. The team ended their inaugural 2009–10 season with a record of 7–43 (.140), the worst record in D-League history. They also became the first (and so far only) team to lose every road game, as they went 0–25. No team won less than 20% of their games until the 2019-20 Northern Arizona Suns (.190); the 2020-21 Iowa Wolves broke the dubious record by going 2–13 for a percentage of .133 before the 2023-24 G League Ignite went 2–32 to set a new mark for futility.

During the 2010–11 season, the Armor started by picking fifth in the D-League Draft, and selected La Salle's Vernon Goodridge. The Armor would end up finishing with a record of 13–37, sixth in the seven-team Eastern Conference. After the season, head coach Dee Brown opted to leave the team to join the Detroit Pistons. Brown was replaced soon after by Bob MacKinnon Jr. During the 2010–11 season, the team was an affiliate of the New Jersey Nets, New York Knicks and Philadelphia 76ers.

For the 2011–12 season, the Armor entered into a single affiliation partnership with the Brooklyn Nets, giving the Nets full control over the basketball operations of and making them the sole affiliate for the Armor. The Nets became the second NBA team to enter into a single affiliation with an NBA D-League team, joining the Houston Rockets and the Rio Grande Valley Vipers.

=== 2014–2021: Grand Rapids Drive ===
On April 15, 2014, it was announced that the SSJ Group purchased the Springfield Armor and would relocate the team to Grand Rapids, Michigan for the 2014–15 season. The Grand Rapids franchise would be locally owned and established a single-franchise "hybrid" affiliation with the Detroit Pistons. The affiliation between the Pistons and the Drive was the third between the two cities as the Detroit Red Wings of the National Hockey League and the Grand Rapids Griffins of the American Hockey League also share an affiliation, as do the Detroit Tigers of the American League and the West Michigan Whitecaps of the Midwest League.

The team launched a name-the-team contest shortly after the formal announcement. The contest produced four finalists: Drive, Chairmen, Horsepower, and Blue Racers. The community was encouraged to vote online in order to determine which of the four names would become the official team name. Out of those names, the Grand Rapids Drive was selected.

On July 29, 2020, the Pistons announced that the organization had officially purchased the Northern Arizona Suns from the Phoenix Suns and were relocating the franchise to Detroit for the 2021–22 season. It was also announced that the affiliation between the Pistons and Drive would end after the 2020–21 season. The ownership of the Drive were stated as looking for an option to continue operations once the affiliation was set to end of after the 2020–21 season. The Drive would be one of several G League teams to opt out of the single-site shortened season held in Orlando. On January 8, 2021, the Drive stated they were negotiating with a new affiliate and could include a new name and logo.

=== 2021–present: Grand Rapids Gold ===
On April 27, 2021, the Drive announced a new affiliation agreement with the Denver Nuggets. As part of the new affiliation, the Drive were rebranded as the Grand Rapids Gold, with the name, logo and color scheme announced on July 7. The organization operates under a hybrid model with the Nuggets controlling the basketball operations and SSJ Group, with Steve Jbara as owner and president and Nate Quicke as Vice president, controlling the team's business operations and community engagement. On August 19, the Gold named Jason Terry as its new head coach.

With the DeltaPlex Arena set to close before the start of the 2022–23 season, the Gold announced on June 2, 2022, that they had signed a five-year lease with Van Andel Arena to serve as their new home.

== Season-by-season ==
Season	Division	Regular season				Postseason results
Season	Division	Finish	Wins	Losses	Pct.	Postseason results
Anaheim Arsenal
2006–07	Western	4th	23	27	.460	
2007–08	Western	4th	23	27	.460	
2008–09	Western	6th	15	35	.300	
Springfield Armor
2009–10	Eastern	7th	7	43	.140	
2010–11	Eastern	6th	13	37	.260	
2011–12	Eastern	1st	29	21	.580	Lost First Round (Canton) 1–2
2012–13	Eastern	5th	18	32	.360	
2013–14	Eastern	3rd	22	28	.440	
Grand Rapids Drive
2014–15	Central	4th	23	27	.460	
2015–16	Central	4th	21	29	.420	
2016–17	Central	4th	26	24	.520	
2017–18	Central	2nd	29	21	.580	Lost First Round (Raptors) 88–92
2018–19	Central	1st	28	22	.560	Lost First Round (Raptors) 90–91
2019–20	Central	3rd	25	18	.581	Season cancelled by COVID-19 pandemic
2020–21	Opted out of single-site season					
Grand Rapids Gold
2021–22	Eastern	7th	17	15	.531	
2022–23	Eastern	14th	9	23	.281	
2023–24	Eastern	16th	11	23	.324	
2024–25	Eastern	12th	15	19	.441	
Regular season record			354	471	.429	2006–present
Playoff record			1	4	.200	2006–present

== Current roster ==
Grand Rapids Gold roster
Players

Pos.	No.	Player	Height	Weight	DOB	From
G/F	7	Tony Carr	6 ft 5 in (1.96 m)	200 lb (91 kg)	1997-10-11	Penn State
F	15	Ben Coupet Jr.	6 ft 7 in (2.01 m)	210 lb (95 kg)	1998-01-28	Southern Illinois
G	3	Rahsool Diggins	6 ft 2 in (1.88 m)	185 lb (84 kg)	1999-10-13	UMass
F	2	Terrence Hargrove	6 ft 4 in (1.93 m)	215 lb (98 kg)	2001-05-10	Saint Louis
G/F	22	P. J. Hayes	6 ft 6 in (1.98 m)	215 lb (98 kg)	2001-07-25	Rutgers
F	–	Bryce Hopkins (TW)	6 ft 7 in (2.01 m)	225 lb (102 kg)	2002-09-07	St John's
G	–	Ryan Nembhard (TW)	5 ft 11 in (1.80 m)	180 lb (82 kg)	2003-03-10	Gonzaga
F	–	Cam Whitmore (TW)	6 ft 7 in (2.01 m)	230 lb (104 kg)	2004-07-08	Villanova

Coaches
Head coach
- Ryan Bowen
Assistant(s)
- Daisuke Yoshimoto
- Logan Quinn
- Antonio Bostic

Legend
- (DP) Unsigned draft pick
- (FA) Free agent
- (S) Suspended
- (P) Prospects
- (NBA) On assignment from NBA affiliate
- (TW) Two-way affiliate player
- Injured

Roster
Updated: March 25, 2026

== Head coaches ==
#	Head coach	Term	Regular season				Playoffs				Achievements
#	Head coach	Term	G	W	L	Win%	G	W	L	Win%	Achievements
1	Reggie Geary	2006–2008	100	46	54	.460	—	—	—	—	
2	Sam Vincent	2008–2009	50	15	35	.300	—	—	—	—	
3	Dee Brown	2009–2011	100	20	80	.200	—	—	—	—	
4	Bob MacKinnon Jr.	2011–2013	100	47	53	.470	3	1	2	.333	
5	Doug Overton	2013–2014	50	22	28	.440	—	—	—	—	
6	Otis Smith	2014–2016	100	44	56	.440	—	—	—	—	
7	Rex Walters	2016–2017	50	26	24	.520	—	—	—	—	
8	Robert Werdann	2017	12	4	8	.333	—	—	—	—	
9	Ryan Krueger	2017–2019	88	53	35	.602	2	0	2	.000	
10	Donnie Tyndall	2019–2020	43	25	18	.581	—	—	—	—	
11	Jason Terry	2021–2022	32	17	15	.531	—	—	—	–	
12	Andre Miller	2022–2025	100	35	65	.350	—	—	—		
13	Ryan Bowen	2025-present				–	—	—	—		

== NBA affiliates ==
=== Anaheim Arsenal ===
- Atlanta Hawks (2006–2009)
- Los Angeles Clippers (2006–2009)
- Orlando Magic (2006–2008)
- Portland Trail Blazers (2006–2007)

=== Springfield Armor ===
- New Jersey / Brooklyn Nets (2009–2014)
- New York Knicks (2009–2011)
- Philadelphia 76ers (2009–2011)

=== Grand Rapids Drive ===
- Detroit Pistons (2014–2021)

=== Grand Rapids Gold ===
- Denver Nuggets (2021–present)
