= Santa Cruz Warriors =

American professional basketball team of the NBA G League

- Conference: Western
- League: NBA G League
- Founded: 1995
- History: Dakota Wizards; 1995–2012; IBA: 1995–2001; CBA: 2001–2006; D-League: 2006–2012; Santa Cruz Warriors; 2012–present
- Arena: Kaiser Permanente Arena
- Location: Santa Cruz, California
- Team colors: Royal blue, California golden yellow, white
- General manager: David Fatoki
- Head coach: Lainn Wilson
- Ownership: Golden State Warriors
- Affiliation: Golden State Warriors
- Championships: IBA: 1 (2001); CBA: 2 (2002, 2004); D-League/G League: 2 (2007, 2015)
- Conference titles: CBA: 3 (2002, 2003, 2005); D-League/G League: 1 (2015)
- Division titles: IBA: 2 (2000, 2001); D-League/G League: 4 (2007, 2008, 2015, 2019)
- Website: santacruz.gleague.nba.com

The Santa Cruz Warriors are an American professional basketball team in the NBA G League based in Santa Cruz, California. They are affiliated with the Golden State Warriors, and play their home games at Kaiser Permanente Arena. Prior to the move to Santa Cruz for the 2012–13 season, the team was known as the Dakota Wizards. The team has won a championship in each of three leagues it has been a part of, and they are the only NBA G League team to reach the championship in three consecutive seasons.

== History ==
=== Dakota Wizards ===
The Warriors began play in 1995 in the International Basketball Association (IBA), and in 2001, with Dave Joerger at the helm, they won the IBA championship in the league's final year of operation.

Following the 2000–01 season, the IBA merged with several teams from the Continental Basketball Association (CBA), and in their first year in the new CBA, Joerger and the Wizards won the league title, defeating the Rockford Lightning. After making it to the semifinals in the 2002–03 season, the Wizards again won the league title in 2004 over the Idaho Stampede, giving Joerger his third title as the Wizards' head coach.

Joerger left the Wizards following the 2003–04 season, and after his departure, the Wizards made it to the semifinals in 2004–05 then missed the playoffs the following season.

Prior to the 2006–07 season, the Wizards joined the NBA Development League, and Joerger returned to Dakota as head coach. He won his fourth title with the Wizards in their first year in the D-League. In the Championship Game, forward Darius Rice came off the Wizards bench to put together a record-setting night that led the Wizards to a 129–121 overtime victory over the Colorado 14ers. Rice scored 52 points and made 11 three-pointers, including one with 4.5 seconds left in regulation to send the game into overtime tied at 109. Rice's points and three-point field goal totals set D-League championship game records.

Between 2007–08 and 2009–10, the Wizards made the playoffs every season but were unable to return to the Finals. This was followed by a 2010–11 season that saw the Wizards miss postseason action for the first time since 2006.

On June 28, 2011, the Golden State Warriors, led by Co-Executive Chairmen Joe Lacob and Peter Guber, purchased the Wizards franchise from Bismarck Professional Basketball LLC. The Warriors became the fourth NBA team to own and operate their own NBA D-League affiliate, joining San Antonio, Oklahoma City and the Los Angeles Lakers.

The Wizards remained in Bismarck during the 2011–12 season, but the Warriors were open to relocating the team to Northern California in 2012. To reflect the new ownership, the Wizards debuted with a new color scheme, the Warriors' blue and gold, used as an alternative to the purple and green, which dates back to their IBA days. The old color scheme was still used with the team's road uniforms, while the blue and gold was used with the home uniforms and the logo. The Wizards were led by Edwin Ubiles in 2011–12, as he helped the team return to the playoffs with a 29–21 record. However, they were unable to move on past the first round following a 2–0 defeat at the hands of the Bakersfield Jam.

=== Santa Cruz Warriors ===
Following intense off-season discussions regarding a move, on October 10, 2012, the Golden State Warriors announced that the Dakota Wizards would relocate to Santa Cruz beginning with the 2012–13 season. The team was subsequently renamed the Santa Cruz Warriors.

In the 2012 NBA Development League Draft, the Warriors selected Travis Leslie with their first pick (13th overall), as Leslie became a star for the team during the 2012–13 season. On December 23, 2012, the Warriors played their first home game at the Kaiser Permanente Arena after beginning their campaign with seven-straight road games. With Leslie leading the way alongside teammates Jeremy Tyler and Maurice Baker, the Warriors made it through to the D-League Finals in their first season. However, they were defeated 2–0 by the Rio Grande Valley Vipers in the best-of-three series. Highlights from the team include Golden State assignees Kent Bazemore and Scott Machado, former NBA player Hilton Armstrong, Most Improved Player recipient Cameron Jones, and Stefhon Hannah, who won Defensive Player of the Year for the second year in a row.

Santa Cruz embraced the team during their first season in the city, as the Warriors placed first in the NBA Development League for overall revenue. The team sold $1.2 million in tickets. The average ticket revenue per game, at $52,651, was the highest in the 16-team league. But while the Warriors' ticket prices were the highest in the league – from $15 for bleachers to $140 for courtside seats – popularity was also key to the financial success. The team had the highest average number of individual tickets sold per game at 709, approximately 130 tickets more than its nearest competitor, the Maine Red Claws.

In 2013–14, the Warriors again finished second in the Western Conference – behind the Los Angeles D-Fenders – and despite only the sixth best record in the G-League standings, the Warriors again reached the Finals. However, they were once again outclassed in the best-of-three Finals series, this time losing 2–0 to the Fort Wayne Mad Ants. Highlights from the team include the Santa Cruz Warriors' G-League Splash Brothers, with Seth Curry and Mychel Thompson emulating their respective brothers playing for Golden State, Stephen Curry and Klay Thompson.

In 2014–15, the Warriors finished with a 35–15 record, good for the best record in the Western Conference. Guard Aaron Craft was named the NBA D League Defensive Player of the Year, leading the league with 2.5 steals per game. The Warriors made it through to the Finals for the third consecutive year and swept the Fort Wayne Mad Ants to claim their first G-League championship since 2007, with Finals MVP Elliot Williams leading the way with a game-high 23 points in Game 2.

Following their 2015 championship, the Warriors failed to make the postseason in the 2015–16 season after finishing with a 19–31 record. Guard Elliot Williams set a Franchise record 48 points in a double overtime victory against the Rio Grande Valley Vipers. The Warriors returned to the postseason in 2016–17, following a 31–9 record, but ultimately fell to the Oklahoma City Blue in their first round series, 1–2.

In 2017–18, the Warriors finished with a 23–27 record, missing the postseason for the third time since joining the NBA Development League in the 2006–07 season. Despite missing the playoffs, the Warriors led the league with an efficient 50.1% team field goal percentage.

The Warriors returned strong in the 2018–19 season, finishing first in the Pacific division and earning a trip to the postseason with a 34–16 record. The Warriors defeated the Oklahoma City Blue, 117–102, in the conference semifinals before falling to the eventual champion Rio Grande Valley Vipers, 125–144, in the conference finals.

The COVID-19 pandemic would cancel the 2019–20 season and lead to a reduced 2020-21 schedule. All games were played in the NBA G League bubble at the ESPN Wide World of Sports Complex at Walt Disney World in Bay Lake, Florida. Santa Cruz was one of 18 participating teams and finished 2nd in the league with an 11–4 record. In the postseason, the Warriors defeated the Rio Grande Valley Vipers, 110–81, before falling to the Lakeland Magic, 96–108, in the conference semifinals.

In the 2021–22 season, the NBA G League returned to a traditional schedule and the Warriors finished with a 15–17 record, narrowly defeating the Austin Spurs in the overtime,118-112, in the final game of the regular season to secure a postseason berth. Following the exciting season conclusion, the Warriors would fall to the South Bay Lakers, 123–134, in the conference quarterfinals.

In 2022–2023, the Warriors finished with an 18–14 record, missing the postseason for the first time since the 2017–18 season. On April 4, rookie guard Lester Quinones was named the NBA G League Most Improved Player. Quinones was also named to the 2022-23 NBA G League All-Rookie Team, averaging 21.8 points, 7.0 rebounds, and 4.8 assists in 31 games with Santa Cruz.

In the 2023 NBA G League Winter Showcase, the Warriors scored a franchise high 153 points versus the G League Ignite. The Warriors returned to the postseason in the 2023–24 season finishing with a 20–14 record. The Warriors defeated the Salt Lake City Stars, 113–111, in the first round before falling to the Stockton Kings, 109–112, in the conference semifinals. Rookie guard Kendric Davis was named to the 2023-24 NBA G League All-Rookie Team, averaging 18.7 points, 4.6 rebounds, and 8.8 assists in 34 games with Santa Cruz.

== Season by season ==
Season	League	Division/ Conference	Finish	Wins	Losses	Pct.	Postseason results
Dakota Wizards
1995–96	IBA		5th	7	17	.292	
1996–97	IBA		2nd	17	13	.567	Won Semifinals (Magic City) 2–1; Lost IBA Finals (Black Hills) 1–2
1997–98	IBA	West	3rd	14	20	.412	
1998–99	IBA	West	5th	12	22	.353	
1999–2000	IBA	West	1st	30	6	.833	Won Division Semifinals (Winnipeg) 2–0; Lost Division Finals (Magic City) 1–3
2000–01	IBA	West	1st	30	10	.750	Won Division Semifinals (Magic City) 2–0; Won Division Finals (Saskatchewan) 2–0; Won IBA Finals (Des Moines) 3–2
2001–02	CBA	National	1st	26	14	.650	Won Semifinals (Fargo-Moorhead) 3–0; Won CBA Finals (Rockford) 116–109
2002–03	CBA	National	1st	31	17	.646	Lost Semifinals (Yakima) 1–3
2003–04	CBA		1st	34	14	.708	Won Semifinals (Rockford) 3–1; Won CBA Finals (Idaho) 132–129
2004–05	CBA	Western	1st	32	16	.667	Lost Semifinals (Sioux Falls) 1–3
2005–06	CBA	Western	4th	19	29	.396	
2006–07	D-League	Eastern	1st	33	17	.660	Won Division Finals (Sioux Falls) 115–113; Won D-League Finals (Colorado) 121–129 (OT)
2007–08	D-League	Central	1st	29	21	.580	Lost First Round (Sioux Falls) 89–101
2008–09	D-League	Central	2nd	27	23	.540	Won First Round (Iowa) 114–109; Lost Semifinals (Utah) 93–103
2009–10	D-League	Eastern	3rd	29	21	.580	Lost First Round (Austin) 1–2
2010–11	D-League	Eastern	4th	19	31	.380	
2011–12	D-League	Eastern	2nd	29	21	.580	Lost First Round (Bakersfield) 0–2
Santa Cruz Warriors
2012–13	D-League	Western	2nd	32	18	.640	Won First Round (Fort Wayne) 2–0; Won Semifinals (Austin) 2–0; Lost D-League Finals (Rio Grande Valley) 0–2
2013–14	D-League	Western	6th	29	21	.580	Won First Round (Los Angeles) 2–0; Won Semifinals (Rio Grande Valley) 2–1; Lost D-League Finals (Fort Wayne) 0–2
2014–15	D-League	Western	1st	35	15	.700	Won First Round (Oklahoma City) 2–0; Won Semifinals (Austin) 2–1; Won D-League Finals (Fort Wayne) 2–0
2015–16	D-League	Pacific	5th	19	31	.380	
2016–17	D-League	Pacific	2nd	31	19	.620	Lost First Round (Oklahoma City) 1–2
2017–18	G League	Pacific	3rd	23	27	.460	
2018–19	G League	Pacific	1st	34	16	.680	Won Conf. Semifinal (Oklahoma City) 117–102; Lost Conf. Final (Rio Grande Valley) 125–144
2019–20	G League	Pacific	2nd	21	21	.500	Season cancelled by COVID-19 pandemic
2020–21	G League		2nd	11	4	.733	Won Quarterfinal (Rio Grande Valley) 110–81; Lost Semifinal (Lakeland) 96–108
2021–22	G League	Western	6th	15	17	.469	Lost Quarterfinal (South Bay) 123–134
2022–23	G League	Western	7th	18	14	.563	
2023–24	G League	Western	4th	20	14	.588	Won Quarterfinal (Salt Lake City) 113–111; Lost Semifinal (Stockton) 109–112
2024–25	G League	Western	4th	20	14	.588	Lost Quarterfinal (Valley) 127–131
2025–26	G League	Western	12th	14	22	.389	
IBA regular season				110	88	.556	1995–2001
CBA regular season				142	90	.612	2001–2006
D/G League regular season				453	356	.560	2006–present
Dakota Wizards regular season totals				418	322	.565	1995–2012
Santa Cruz Warriors regular season totals				322	253	.560	2012–present
Regular season total				740	575	.563	1995–present
Dakota Wizards playoff totals				27	19	.587	1995–2012
Santa Cruz Warriors playoff totals				18	13	.581	2012–present
Playoffs totals				45	32	.584	1995–present

== Current roster ==
Santa Cruz Warriors roster
Players

Pos.	No.	Player	Height	Weight	DOB	From
G	00	Obi Agbim	6 ft 3 in (1.91 m)	183 lb (83 kg)	2002-09-30	Baylor
G	19	Nick Boyd	6 ft 3 in (1.91 m)	170 lb (77 kg)	2001-04-23	Wisconsin
F	27	Tyler Burton	6 ft 7 in (2.01 m)	215 lb (98 kg)	2000-02-11	Richmond
G	18	LJ Cryer (TW)	6 ft 0 in (1.83 m)	202 lb (92 kg)	2001-10-09	Houston
G	29	Alex Gil-Fernandez	6 ft 4 in (1.93 m)	190 lb (86 kg)	1998-04-07	California State-San Marcos
F/C	45	Graham Ike	6 ft 10 in (2.08 m)	245 lb (111 kg)	2002-09-03	Gonzaga
G	99	Miles Kelly	6 ft 4 in (1.93 m)	190 lb (86 kg)	2003-01-26	Auburn
F	33	Malevy Leons (TW)	6 ft 9 in (2.06 m)	206 lb (93 kg)	1999-09-23	Bradley
G	55	Chance McMillian	6 ft 3 in (1.91 m)	195 lb (88 kg)	2001-02-06	Texas Tech
C	40	Jacksen Moni	6 ft 10 in (2.08 m)	235 lb (107 kg)	2003-02-20	North Dakota State
F	41	Elias Ralph	6 ft 7 in (2.01 m)	211 lb (96 kg)	2003-10-23	Pacific
G	43	Deivon Smith	6 ft 0 in (1.83 m)	175 lb (79 kg)	2002-03-08	St. John's
F	22	Alex Toohey	6 ft 8 in (2.03 m)	217 lb (98 kg)	2004-05-05	Sydney Kings

Coaches
Head coach
- Lainn Wilson
Assistant(s)
- Hilton Armstrong
- Nick Kerr
- Ben Stelzer

Legend
- (DP) Unsigned draft pick
- (FA) Free agent
- (S) Suspended
- (P) Prospects
- (NBA) On assignment from NBA affiliate
- (TW) Two-way affiliate player
- Injured

Roster
Updated: March 3, 2026

== Head coaches ==
#	Head coach	Term	Regular season				Playoffs				Achievements
#	Head coach	Term	G	W	L	Win%	G	W	L	Win%	Achievements
1	Duane Ticknor	1999–2000; 2007–2009	136	86	50	.632	9	4	5	.444	
2	Dave Joerger	2000–2004; 2006–2007	226	154	72	.681	21	16	5	.762	
3	Rory White	2009–2011	100	48	52	.480	3	1	2	.333	
4	Nate Bjorkgren	2011–2013	100	61	39	.610	8	4	4	.500	
5	Casey Hill	2013–2017	200	114	86	.570	17	11	6	.647	NBA D-League champion: 2015
6	Aaron Miles	2017–2019	100	57	43	.570	2	1	1	.500	
7	Kris Weems	2019–2021	57	32	25	.561	2	1	1	.500	
8	Seth Cooper	2021–2023	67	33	34	.493	1	0	1	.000	
9	Nick Kerr	2023–2025	68	40	28	.588	3	1	2	.333	
10	Lainn Wilson	2025–present	36	14	22	.389	0	0	0	–	

== NBA affiliates ==
=== Dakota Wizards ===
- Chicago Bulls (2006–2007)
- Washington Wizards (2006–2011)
- Memphis Grizzlies (2007–2011)
- Golden State Warriors (2011–2012)

=== Santa Cruz Warriors ===
- Golden State Warriors (2012–present)
