= Julian King (basketball) =

American basketball player

Personal information
- Listed height: 6 ft 6 in (1.98 m)
- Listed weight: 220 lb (100 kg)

Career information
- High school: Dodge County (Eastman, Georgia)
- College: Temple (1992–1994); Coppin State (1994–1996)
- Playing career: 1996–2007
- Position: Forward
- Coaching career: 2007–present

Career history

Playing
- 1999–2000: Magic City Snowbears (IBA)
- 2006–2007: Boston Frenzy (ABA)
- 2007: Quad City River Hawks (ABA)

Coaching
- 2007–2008: T. C. Williams HS (asst.)
- 2008–2014: T. C. Williams HS
- 2014–2015: Saint John Mill Rats (Canada)

Julian King is an American retired professional basketball player who most recently was the head coach for the Saint John Mill Rats of the National Basketball League of Canada (NBL). He played at the collegiate level with Temple and Coppin State after graduating Dodge County High School. As a pro player, King has experience competing in various minor leagues across the United States, multiple NBA camps, and in countries such as Mexico, Germany, Switzerland, Paraguay, and Argentina. He is currently a trainer based in Bethesda, Maryland.

== High school career ==
King attended Dodge County High School in Eastman, Georgia, where he played basketball as a wing forward. In his senior season, he averaged 20 points and 8 rebounds. King chose to play college basketball for Temple University in Philadelphia, Pennsylvania after meeting the academic requirements.

== Collegiate career ==
King played with the Temple Owls men's basketball team under Hall of Fame head coach John Chaney for his first two seasons. He transferred to Coppin State as a junior and remained there for his final year. In 1997, King and David Houston, who went on to become the head coach of West Potomac High School, powered the Eagles to second round appearance at the NCAA Tournament. At Coppin State, King was coached by Fang Mitchell, who he considered to be a future Hall of Famer.

== Professional career ==
King competed with the Magic City Snowbears of the International Basketball Association (IBA) from 1999 to 2000. He played under head coach Rob Spon, whom he would later cross paths with in his own coaching career. From 2006 to 2007, he served as a player-coach with the Boston Frenzy of the American Basketball Association (ABA). In early February 2007, King signed with the Quad City Riverhawks, who also played in the ABA. However, he was waived just over a week later after suffering a broken finger. The move eventually ended King's playing career.

== Coaching career ==
=== T. C. Williams High School ===
Following his retirement from playing basketball, King decided to return to the court as a coach, so that he could mentor young players and pass on his own knowledge. He also approached the idea because it provided him with a "mental challenge." King was initially a physical education teacher at a private school in Washington, D.C. However, he landed an assistant coaching job at T. C. Williams High School in Alexandria, Virginia in 2007. While on the Titans' staff in his first season, King's team won the Virginia AAA state championship. In July 2008, head coach Ivan Thomas announced his resignation and King began assuming his position. He inherited a high school basketball program that went 78–11 overall and a perfect 52–0 in the Patriot District in Thomas's final three years at its helm. The former coach said, "Are you really feeling the pressure of winning back-to-back? The thing he has to do is be Julian King, not Ivan Thomas. He'll be fine, regardless of what people say...I think Julian will do a great job here." King would spend six seasons at T. C Williams, leading the school to 3 district titles, 2 Northern Region championships and 2 appearances at the state tournament. In his final year, the Titans finished with a 4–16 record. In mid-March 2014, he resigned as the team's head coach. Athletics director Steve Colantuoni said, "Julian's been very successful here, so it did kind of take me aback when he resigned. But we’re grateful for all he's done" Over that summer, King was an advance scout with the Connecticut Sun of the Women's National Basketball Association (WNBA).

=== Saint John Mill Rats ===
On August 12, 2014, King was announced as the head coach of the Saint John Mill Rats, a professional team from the National Basketball League of Canada (NBL). The former coach, Rob Spon, joined the Rochester Razorsharks of the PBL. Spon considered hiring King as an assistant coach with the Razorsharks if he was not approached by the Mill Rats. By the end of the season, King led Saint John to a 17–15 regular season record and a semifinals appearance in the playoffs. On May 7, 2015, King was replaced by Spon, who returned to the Mill Rats organization after leading Rochester to a PBL championship and an undefeated season.

== Training career ==
Following his departure from the Saint John Mill Rats, King became a basketball instructor at E-Train University, which is based in Bethesda, Maryland. Other members of the program included former Clemson college player Dave Potter, ex-Richmond Spider Eric Poole, and Boston Celtics draft pick and player Junior Burrough.
