= Winnipeg Cyclone =

- Division: IBA West Division (1997–2001)
- League: International Basketball Association
- Founded: 1995
- Folded: 2002
- History: Winnipeg Cyclone (1995–2001)
- Arena: Winnipeg Convention Centre
- Capacity: ~2,600
- Location: Winnipeg, Manitoba
- General manager: Rod Macisaac
- Ownership: Earl and Cheryl Barish (Majority); Sam Katz (Part owner)
- Championships: 0
- Division titles: 1 (1998-99)
- Website: Cyclone Website (archived)

Winnipeg Cyclone were a professional basketball club based in Winnipeg, Manitoba that competed in the International Basketball Association from 1995 to 2001. The Cyclone played its home games at the Winnipeg Convention Centre (dubbed the "Wind Tunnel"). However, the Cyclone did not enjoy significant popularity, usually playing before sparse crowds. The club was backed largely by local businesspeople Earl Barish, Cheryl Barish and Sam Katz

== History ==
The Winnipeg Cyclone was established on October 3, 1995 as one of the founding five franchises of the International Basketball Association and only one of two Canadian teams that existed in the league.

The team ownership group consisted of majority owners Earl and Cheryl Barish and future Winnipeg mayor Sam Katz as part owner.

On October 10, 1995 the Cyclone announced the signing of Curt Pickering as the team’s inaugural head coach.

The first player to sign with the club was Shannon Sharpe, a 6'7 Guard from Long Island University. Arthur Agee played for the team in 1995. Agee starred in the 1994 documentary Hoop Dreams. The Cyclone lost their inaugural game on December 5, 1995 with a score of 100-91 to the home team Black Hills Posse.

The Cyclone had several recognizable names on the roster and coaching staff during the franchise's short existence. From 1998–2000, former NBA star Darryl Dawkins served as a players coach for the franchise, winning Co-Coach of the Year for the 1999 season along with Mansfield Hawks coach Kevin Mackey. Andrell Hoard won back-to-back Most Valuable Player honors in 1998 and 1999.

== Personnel ==
Head coaches

#	Name	Term	Regular season				Playoffs				Achievements	Reference
#	Name	Term	GC	W	L	Win%	GC	W	L	Win%	Achievements	Reference
1	Curt Pickering	1995–1996	24	14	10	.583	3	1	2	.333		
2	Bill Klucas	1996–1998	64	28	36	.438	3	1	2	.333		
3	Darryl Dawkins	1998–2000	70	37	33	.529	8	3	5	.375	1999 IBA West Division Champions	
4	Grant Richter	2000–2001	40	11	29	.275	–	–	–	–		

General Managers

Rod McIsaac

== Honours ==
Most Valuable Player

Season	Winner
1997–98	Andrell Hoard
1998–99	Andrell Hoard

Coach of the Year

Year	Winner
1998–99	Darryl Dawkins

All IBA First Team

Season	Player	Position
1998–99	Andrell Hoard	

All IBA Second Team

Season	Player	Position
1995–96	Luther Burks	Guard
1996–97	Corey Williams	
1997–98	Martin Lewis	
1999–00	Kwan Johnson	
2000–01	Louis Davis	

All IBA Honourable Mentions

Season	Player	Position
1995–96	Shane Drisdom	Forward
1995–96	Kwesi Coleman	Guard
1996–97	Darren Sanderlin	Guard
1997–98	Darren Sanderlin	Guard
1998–99	Sean Tyson	
1999–00	Louis Davis	

== End of franchise ==
After the 2001 season, it was announced that the IBA would cease operations. League leaders made the decision after failing to acquire commitments for the upcoming 2002 season from several franchises, having to push back the application deadline on several occasions. Four teams from the IBL (Dakota Wizards, Fargo Beez, Sioux Falls Skyforce, and Saskatchewan Hawks) would go on to join the Continental Basketball Association's eight-team expansion. For a time, Winnipeg was rumored to be joining the CBA as well, but ultimately decided against the move. The Cyclone Won their final game on February 24, 2001 103-95 Vs the Salina Rattlers. In 6 seasons, the Cyclone won 90 games while losing 108. Darryl Dawkins finished as the franchise's winningest coach, tallying a 37-33 record in his two years as the head of the Cyclone.

== Basketball in Winnipeg ==
Following the sequential demises of the Winnipeg Thunder and the Cyclone, professional basketball disappeared from Winnipeg. In 2013, the Canadian Basketball League, in conjunction with Cosmos Sports, conducted a feasibility study that showed Winnipeg could successfully host a professional basketball franchise if chosen. After a meeting with potential owners later in the year, it was decided that there wasn't enough interest to reach the expansion minimum of eight teams. Professional basketball would return to Winnipeg in 2023 with the expansion CEBL franchise Winnipeg Sea Bears.

== Franchise record ==
Record table
Season	Team	Overall	Conference	Standing	Postseason
Winnipeg Cyclone (International Basketball Association) (1996–2001)
1995–96	Winnipeg	14-10	N/A	2nd in the IBA	Lost in the IBA semifinals 2-1 to the Fargo-Moorhead Beez
1996–97	Winnipeg	13-17	N/A	4th in the IBA	Did not qualify
1997–98	Winnipeg	15–19	West	2nd in the IBA West	Lost in the IBA west Division Finals 2-1 to the Black Hills Posse
1998–99	Winnipeg	22-12	West	1st in the IBA West	Won the West Division semifinals 2-1 vs the Billings RimRockers Lost West Division finals 2-1 to the Magic City Snowbears
1999–00	Winnipeg	15-21	West	4th in the IBA West	Lost in the IBA West Division semi finals 2-0 to the Dakota Wizards
2000-01	Winnipeg	11-29	West	5th in the IBA West	Did not qualify
Total:		90–108 (.455)			
National champion Postseason invitational champion Conference regular season champion Conference regular season and conference tournament champion Division regular season champion Division regular season and conference tournament champion Conference tournament champion
