= Kris Bruton =

American basketball player (born 1971)

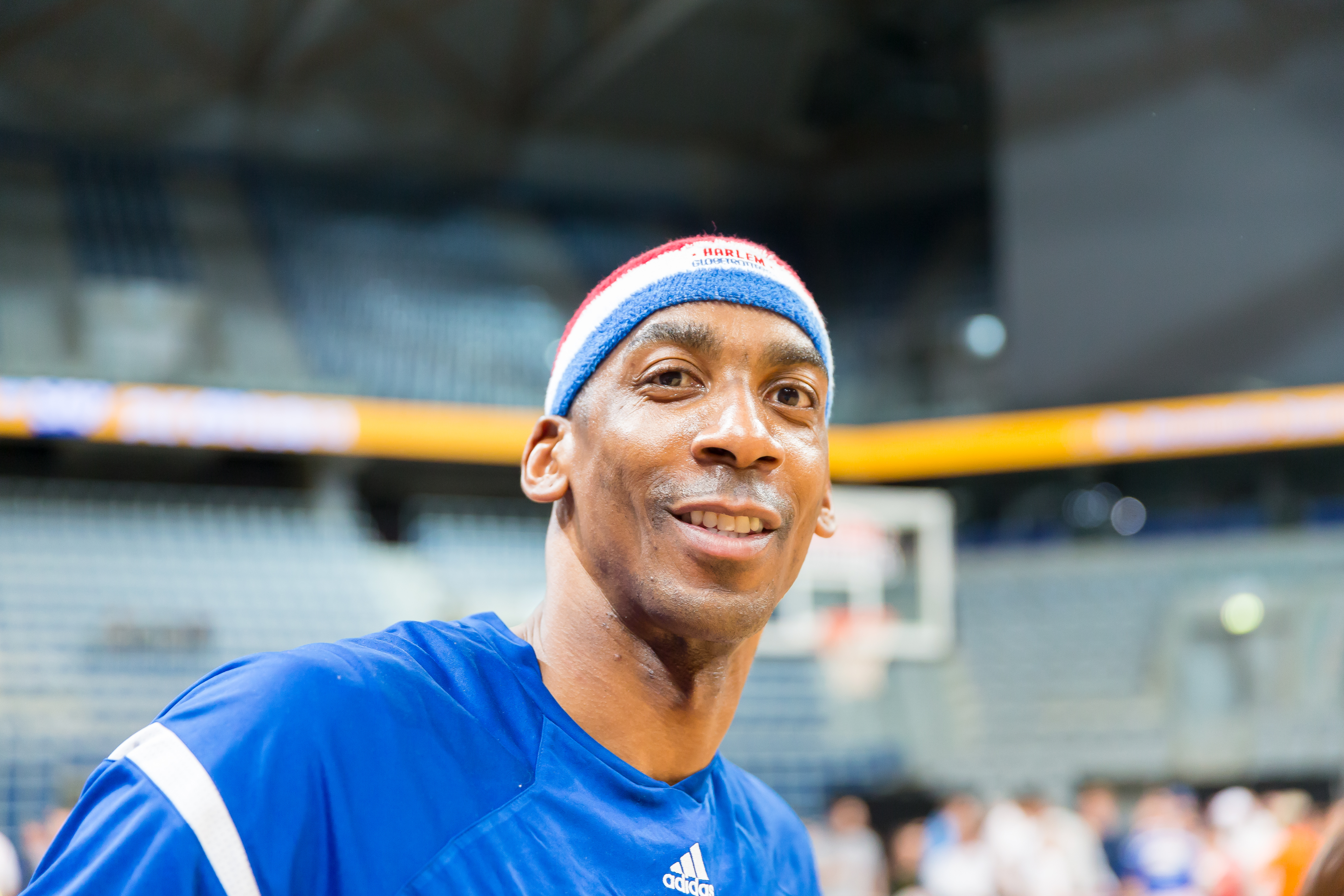
- Bruton with the Harlem Globetrotters in 2017

Personal information
- Born: January 10, 1971 (age 55) Greer, South Carolina, U.S.
- Listed height: 6 ft 7 in (2.01 m)
- Listed weight: 218 lb (99 kg)

Career information
- College: Benedict (1990–1994)
- NBA draft: 1994: 2nd round, 49th overall pick
- Drafted by: Chicago Bulls

Career history
- 1994–1995: Pittsburgh Pirates
- 1997–1998: St. Paul Slam!
- 1998–1999: Rockford Lightning
- 1998–1999: Des Moines Dragons

Career highlights
- CBA All-Rookie Second Team (1995)
- Stats at Basketball Reference

Kris Marcus Bruton (born January 10, 1971) is an American professional basketball player. Drafted by the Chicago Bulls in the second round of the 1994 NBA draft, he was with the Bulls for two pre-seasons (1994 and 1995) before a serious thigh injury ended his career. Bruton never appeared in a regular-season NBA game for the Bulls. After recuperating, he was recruited by the Harlem Globetrotters, carving a niche on the court as a slam dunk expert.

== Pre-professional career ==
Born in Greer, South Carolina, Bruton played very little high school basketball. A number of injuries kept him off the court for most of his four years at the local school. After graduating, Bruton enrolled at Benedict College in Columbia, South Carolina, but did not pursue a position on the school's basketball team. Only after a pick-up game in the school gymnasium was he recruited by the team's coach and offered an athletic scholarship.

Bruton was selected for NAIA First Team All-American honors as a senior for the 1993–1994 season. That year, he averaged 20.4 points and ten rebounds per game, while completing 231 of 380 shots. He also won the Slam Dunk Contest during the 1994 NCAA Final Four Weekend in Charlotte, North Carolina, and again in New Orleans, Louisiana in 2003.

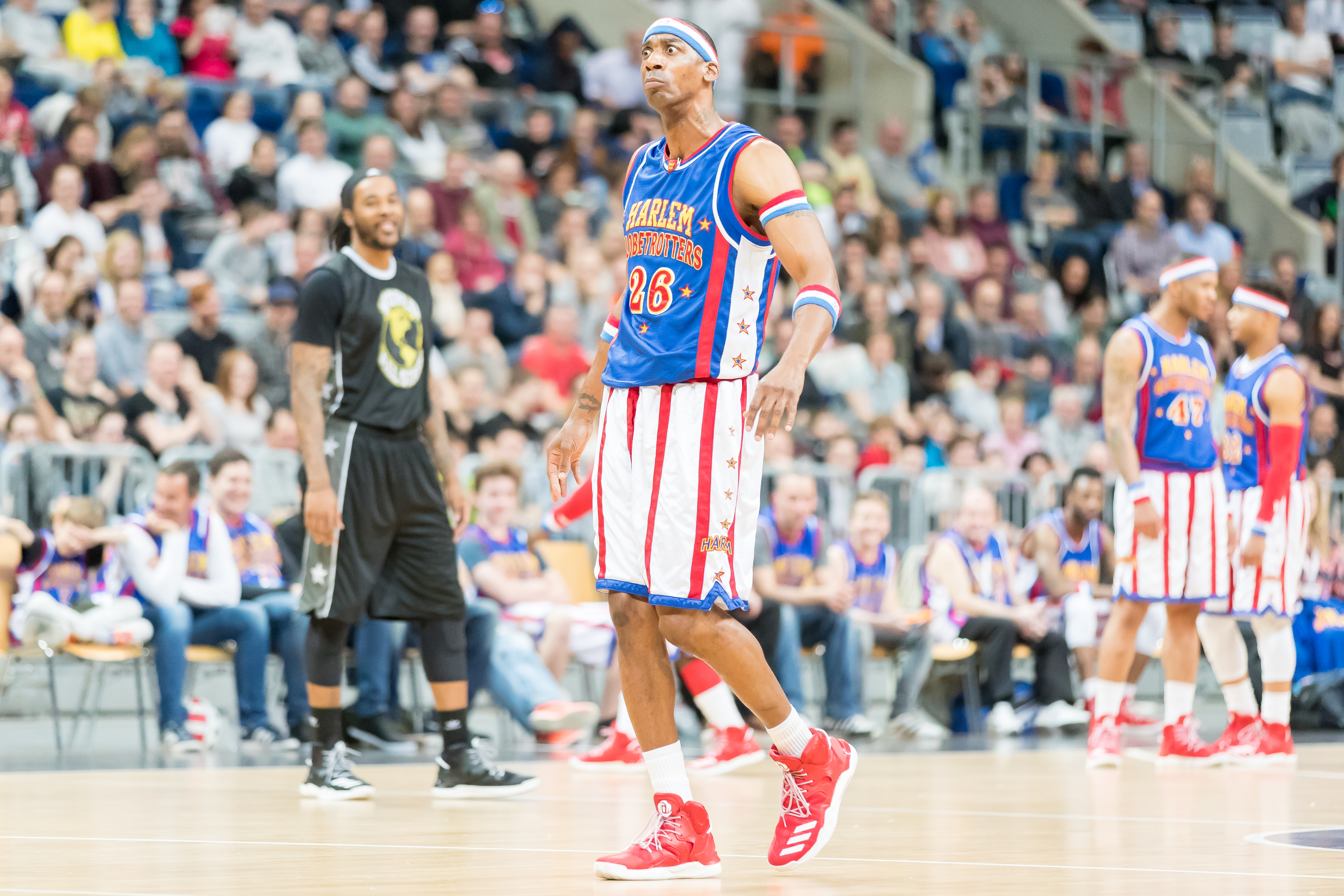
Kris Bruton as "Hi-Lite" in March 2017 with the Harlem Globetrotters in Mannheim Germany

== Professional career ==
Following his graduation from Benedict College, Bruton was drafted by the Chicago Bulls in the second round of the 1994 NBA draft. The 49th pick overall, he was a pre-season cut in both 1994 and 1995 before a thigh injury ended his NBA career. Bruton spent his rookie season with the Pittsburgh Piranhas of the Continental Basketball Association (CBA) and was selected to the CBA All-Rookie Second Team in 1995. Shortly after, he traveled overseas to play in Nagoya, Japan, where he played for two years before returning to the United States and playing in the CBA. Three years later, he would return overseas playing in France and Cyprus.

Bruton returned to his hometown after his tours in Europe. He joined the National Basketball Development League in Greenville, South Carolina, playing under Milton Barnes. Barnes was also serving as a coach for the Globetrotters and arranged a meeting between Bruton and other Globetrotters' staff after observing his play. An agreement was reached shortly thereafter, and Bruton played his first game with the Globetrotters in December 2001. His unique jumping abilities made him an early crowd favorite.

During a tour of the Bahamas, Bruton and several other Globetrotters attempted to break the world record for highest slam dunk. While eyewitnesses allege that he successfully completed a dunk at 12'1", thus breaking the record, on-site judges declared it an illegal dunk.
