= Sunset Valley Barn Dance =

The Sunset Valley Barn Dance was an American country music radio and later television program broadcast by KSTP of St. Paul, Minnesota, which ran for nearly 20 years, starting in 1940.

== History ==
=== Beginnings ===
In 1940, the station KSTP launched a series of new programs, including the Sunset Valley Barn Dance, which was broadcast on Saturday evenings. The goal of the channel was to deliver "true american folk music in its original form" to listeners. The first show was broadcast on October 26, 1940 from the St. Paul Auditorium (now known as the Roy Wilkins Auditorium). It was produced by David Stone, who was previously the original announcer at the Grand Ole Opry in Nashville. Soon afterward, the Sunset Valley Barn Dance became one of the most popular country programs in the Midwest.

=== Golden Years ===
In addition to country musicians, comedians such as the Illinois Quarantine appeared on the show. Regular guests of the show included Fiddlin 'Hank, Kim Weston, Cactus Slim, Trapper Nash and Glenn Burklund. In 1948, Stone also brought the show to KSTP-TV, the newly established television station, and aired the Sunset Valley Barn Dance on television. There were also touring shows under the Sunset Valley Barn Dance name which played in small communities where a live broadcast to radio wouldn't be possible. In 1953, the KSTP transmitter expanded its transmission range, as it increased the 50,000 watt station to 133,500 watts.

=== Decline and legacy ===
By the late 1950s, the "golden age" of country shows slowly passed and the Sunset Valley Barn Dance lost much of its popularity. Due to low ratings, the program was later discontinued. Stone and the Sunset Valley Barn Dance were named in Garrison Keillor's Prairie Home Companion song "The Family Radio". In 1983, Gerald Barfuss published the book David Stone in Sunset Valley, which details the history of the Sunset Valley Barn Dance. David Stone stayed with KSTP until 1986 and died in 1995.

== Guests ==
- Chuck Carson
- Fiddlin’ Russ
- Fiddlin’ Hank
- Kim Weston
- Stu Davis, Canada’s Cowboy Troubadour
- Cactus Slim, The Lonesome Serenader
- Irene & Lou
- Kathy Datwyler
- Pearl and Ade Seamans
- Billy Folger
- Andy Walsh
- Bobby Walker
- Trapper Nash
- Six-Gun Mel
- Kathrin Kohls
- Bill Kelsey
- Hank & Thelma
- The Michael Sisters
- Chuck Mulkern
- Alfalfa Neers
- Frank & Esther, Sweethearts Of The Radio
- Johnny Konchal
- Genevieve Hovde
