= Willie Murdaugh =

American basketball player

Personal information
- Born: Wade Hampton, South Carolina, U.S.
- Listed height: 6 ft 3 in (1.91 m)
- Listed weight: 195 lb (88 kg)

Career information
- High school: Wade Hampton (Greenville, South Carolina)
- College: North Greenville (1987–1989); USC Upstate (1989–1991)
- NBA draft: 1991: undrafted
- Playing career: 1992–2005
- Position: Point guard

Career history
- 1992–1993: Greenville Spinners
- 1993–1994: Cape Breton Breakers
- 1996–1998: Dakota Wizards
- 1998–1999: Idaho Stampede
- 2000–2001: Dakota Wizards
- 2002: Saskatchewan Hawks
- 2003–2004: Dakota Wizards
- 2004–2005: Calgary Drillers

Career highlights
- CBA champion (2004); All-CBA Second Team (2002); CBA Defensive Player of the Year (2002); CBA All-Defensive Team (2002); IBA champion (2001); All-IBA Second Team (1998); IBA Defensive Player of the Year (2001); No. 41 retired by Dakota Wizards; Peach Belt Player of the Year (1991); First-team All-Peach Belt (1991)

Willie Terell Murdaugh is an American former professional basketball player. He played college basketball for the North Greenville Trailblazers and USC Upstate Spartans. Murdaugh played professionally in minor leagues including the International Basketball Association (IBA) and Continental Basketball Association (CBA). He won two championships with the Dakota Wizards in the IBA in 2001 and CBA in 2004. Murdaugh was the IBA Defensive Player of the Year in 2001 and CBA Defensive Player of the Year in 2002.

== Early life ==
Murdaugh was born to Willie and Patricia Rivers and is a native of Wade Hampton, South Carolina. He started playing basketball when he was aged six after he watched his uncle play. Murdaugh attended Wade Hampton High School and played on the basketball, football and baseball teams. He earned All-State honors in basketball.

== College career ==
In May 1987, Murdaugh signed to play college basketball at North Greenville College (now North Greenville University. In April 1989, he signed a scholarship to play for the USC Upstate Spartans. He led the team to a 29–3 record during the 1989–90 season. Murdaugh also set the USC Upstate single season record for three-point percentage with 54.2%. He averaged 17.8 points per game during his final season in 1990–91. He was selected as the Peach Belt Conference co-Player of the Year alongside his teammate Ulysses Hackett. He recorded 10 steals in a game against the Gardner–Webb Runnin' Bulldogs in 1991 which remains a program record.

Murdaugh was inducted into the USC Upstate Athletics Hall of Fame in 2008.

== Professional career ==
Murdaugh was selected by the New Haven Skyhawks of the United States Basketball League (USBL) as the 48th overall pick of the 1991 USBL draft. In February 1992, he was acquired by the Greenville Spinners of the Global Basketball Association (GBA). On October 20, 1992, Murdaugh re-signed with the Spinners.

Murdaugh played for the Cape Breton Breakers of the Canadian National Basketball League (NBL) in 1993. He led the NBL in three-point shooting percentage during the 1993 season. Murdaugh returned to the Breakers for the 1994 season.

Murdaugh was invited by the Los Angeles Lakers to their rookie camp in 1996 after he was noticed by a scout at a tournament in Montana. In November 1996, he joined the Dakota Wizards of the International Basketball Association (IBA). Murdaugh led the IBA in technical fouls during the 1997 season. He had a stint with a team in Beijing during the 1997 offseason. Murdaugh re-signed with the Wizards in August 1997. On January 20, 1998, Murdaugh received a five-game suspension from the IBA for confronting a referee after he was ejected from a game. He averaged 21 points, 8 rebounds and 4 assists and was named to the All-IBA Second Team. In February 1998, Murdaugh signed with the Idaho Stampede of the Continental Basketball Association (CBA). He played the entire 1998–99 season with the Stampede. Murdaugh did not play during the 1999–2000 season.

In November 2000, Murdaugh returned to the Wizards. He was chosen as the IBA Defensive Player of the Year in 2001 after he averaged a league-high 3.1 steals per game. The Wizards won the 2001 IBA championship. Murdaugh was expected to retire at the end of the 2000–01 season and had his number retired by the Wizards.

In January 2002, Murdaugh signed with the Saskatchewan Hawks of the CBA. He appeared in 27 games and averaged a team-best 18.7 points per game. Murdaugh was chosen as the CBA Defensive Player of the Year after he averaged 2.5 steals per game.

In August 2002, Murdaugh signed with the Wizards who had joined the CBA. He ultimately decided to not join the team before the season started as he did not want to relocate his family. Murdaugh was brought out of retirement by the Wizards for a short stint in December 2003 due to a lack of players. He returned to the Wizards for a second stint in February 2004. The Wizards won the 2004 CBA championship.

Murdaugh played for the Calgary Drillers of the American Basketball Association (ABA) during the 2004–05 season.

Murdaugh played 3x3 basketball for Team Saskatoon in Canada. He led the team to a second place finish at the 2014 FIBA 3x3 World Tour. Murdaugh retired from playing in 2017 aged 47.

== Personal life ==
Murdaugh met his wife, Leanne MacIntyre, in Saskatoon. They have four children. Murdaugh lives in Saskatchewan.
