= Brian Shorter =

American-Italian basketball player

Personal information
- Born: November 28, 1968 (age 57) Philadelphia, Pennsylvania
- Listed height: 6 ft 6 in (1.98 m)
- Listed weight: 242 lb (110 kg)

Career information
- High school: Simon Gratz (Philadelphia, Pennsylvania); Oak Hill Academy (Mouth of Wilson, Virginia)
- College: Pittsburgh (1987–1991)
- NBA draft: 1991: undrafted
- Playing career: 1991–2010
- Position: Forward

Career history
- 1991–1993: Oostende
- 1993: Ginebra San Miguel
- 1994: Fort Wayne Fury
- 1994: Pau-Orthez
- 1994–1995: Andino
- 1996: Trieste
- 1996: Peñas Huesca
- 1996–1997: Andino
- 1997–1998: Black Hills Posse
- 1998: Guaiqueríes de Margarita
- 1998: Trieste
- 1998: Virtus Ragusa
- 1998–1999: Cordivari Roseto
- 1999–2000: Viola Reggio Calabria
- 2000: CB Girona
- 2001–2002: Virtus Ragusa
- 2002–2003: Andrea Costa Imola
- 2003–2004: JuveCaserta
- 2004–2007: Firenze Basket
- 2007–2008: Basket Massafra
- 2008–2009: Catanzaro
- 2009–2010: Gorizia

Career highlights
- LNB rebounding leader (1995); AP honorable mention All-American (1989); 2× First-team All-Big East (1989, 1990); Second-team All-Big East (1991); Big East Freshman of the Year (1989); McDonald's All-American (1987); First-team Parade All-American (1987); Third-team Parade All-American (1986)

Brian William Shorter (born November 28, 1968) is an American-Italian former professional basketball player. He spent two decades playing in European leagues.

== High school career ==
Shorter, a Philadelphia native, grew up in a low-income neighborhood. He attended Simon Gratz High School along with his older brother Rodney and was consistently ranked among the top recruits of his class. As a freshman he was one of the first options off the bench, averaging 15.3 points and receiving All-Public League honors, being a Third team selection. In his sophomore year he was named as ESPN Sophomore of the Year with season averages of 20 points and 10 rebounds. In the 1985 Philadelphia Public League Simon Gratz lost 69 to 70 in the semifinals against Southern, led by future college star Lionel Simmons. Shorter was named in the All-Public League First Team and All-City third team. In his junior year he averaged 31.8 points, 15.8 rebounds and 2.6 blocks; Gratz again lost to Southern in the semifinals despite a 33-points, 17-rebounds performance by Shorter, who also shot 14 for 15 from the field. For the second year in a row Shorter was named in the All-Public and All-City first team, and he was also selected as the Pennsylvania Gatorade Player of the Year.

After a 3-year career at Simon Gratz, Shorter had scored 1,869 points, that placed him only 383 points behind Wilt Chamberlain's Philadelphia record of 2,252. Despite the opportunity to pass the record on his senior season, Shorter had been having issues with his GPA and he and his teachers were worried that he would fail to achieve the minimum SAT score required to attend college. In order to improve his grades while maintaining a high level of basketball competition, Shorter transferred to Oak Hill Academy, a boarding school known for his basketball program. At the beginning of 1987 Shorter committed to play for Pitt and had to work both in the classroom and on the basketball court. In his senior year he averaged 23 points and 13 rebounds, ranking among the top seniors in his class and at the end of his senior year he was selected in the Parade All-America first team and was named a McDonald's All-American. In the 1987 McDonald's All-American Boys Game he was the top scorer with 24 points, and he also grabbed 8 rebounds. Throughout his high school career, the best aspects of his game were his physical play, his strength and mobility for his size (drawing comparisons to Bernard King)

== College career ==
Shorter had committed to play for Pitt, but his SAT score was below 700, too low for a college scholarship, and he therefore failed to qualify academically: this, according to NCAA Proposition 48, meant that he had to sit out his freshman year, being ineligible to play. Despite a possibility to attend other schools like Kutztown University of Pennsylvania, where other players went after failing the Division I academic requirements, he decided to work out on his own, focusing on weight training, ball handling and jumpshooting.

After his first year of inactivity, Shorter debuted in the 1988–89 season. He immediately had an impact at Pitt, starting all 30 games and leading the team in scoring and rebounding; he was third in scoring and second in rebounds in his conference with a 9.6 average (the top rebounder was Derrick Coleman). He was named Big East Freshman of the Year and was also part of the Big East First Team. He was also an NCAA All-American Honorable Mention.

In his second season he led the Big East in scoring with an average of 20.6, and his rebound average of 9.4 placed him third after Coleman and Dikembe Mutombo. His third and final year of college saw a slight decline in almost all statistical categories, also due to his decreased minutes per game average: despite averaging more than 30 minutes for his first two seasons, in 1990–91 he only averaged 25.9 minutes. He finished his season with 13.6 points and 6.4 rebounds. Throughout his college career he showed a consistent ability to draw fouls (he was 1st in free throw attempts in 1989 in the Big East and 1st in the NCAA in 1990).

=== College statistics ===
Year	Team	GP	GS	MPG	FG%	3P%	FT%	RPG	APG	SPG	BPG	PPG
1988–89	Pitt	30	30	34.9	.600	.500	.715	9.6	1.6	0.6	0.5	19.6
1989–90	Pitt	29	29	36.8	.532	.000	.662	9.4	1.4	1.0	0.5	20.6
1990–91	Pitt	33	32	25.9	.473	.000	.769	6.4	1.1	0.5	0.5	13.6
Career		92	91	32.3	.538	.100	.710	8.4	1.3	0.7	0.5	17.8

== Professional career ==
Shorter was automatically eligible for the 1991 NBA draft, but he was not drafted by an NBA franchise and he decided to play overseas: his first team was Oostende in Belgium, where he played for 2 seasons. He ended the 1993 season at Ginebra San Miguel in the Philippines. In 1994 he signed for the Fort Wayne Fury in the Continental Basketball Association, where he only played 2 games scoring a total 9 points. After a brief passage at French club Pau-Orthez (5 games), Shorter signed for Andino in the Argentine Liga Nacional de Básquet, where he led the league in rebounding with an average of 13.2.

In 1996 he had a brief stint in the Italian league, playing 4 games with a scoring average of 16.8. Throughout his career he played several seasons in Italy, both in the top division and in the lower leagues. He played in the Spanish top division, Liga ACB, in the 1995–96, appearing in only 5 games for Peñas Huesca. He then played once more in Argentina, again for Andino, and in the IBA team Black Hills Posse.

He then played for several teams in Italy (including Roseto, where he played 24 games recording 18.7 points per game). He ended his career in 2010, aged 42, playing for Gorizia.
