= George Daniel (lacrosse) =

George Daniel is an American sports official, a former Commissioner of the National Lacrosse League. He was appointed to the position effective January 10, 2009, succeeding Jim Jennings. On January 7, 2016, he was succeeded by Nick Sakiewicz.

== Early life and education ==
Daniel is a native of Easton, Pennsylvania, and attended Easton Area High School in Easton, where he graduated in 1981. He is a 1988 graduate of Temple University School of Law.

== Career ==
Daniel served as Deputy Commissioner and General Counsel for the National Lacrosse League from 2000 to 2006 before leaving for one season to become President of the New York Titans. As the Titans team president, Daniel was responsible for all aspects of the launch of the team's business operations, which culminated in the franchise's January 20 home opener at Madison Square Garden played in front of 13,127 fans, the fourth-largest crowd for an inaugural home game in the 21-year history of the league. The Titans were also televised regionally, drawing a higher viewer rating than the New Jersey Devils and New York Islanders on January 27, a night when all three teams played televised games.

He also founded the Black Hills Posse of the International Basketball Association and the Scranton Miners of the Atlantic Basketball Association. He is a former co-owner of the Bellingham Bells baseball franchise.
