= RimRockers =

RimRockers may refer to:

- Arkansas RimRockers, former NBA Development League team
- Billings RimRockers, former professional basketball club based in Billings, Montana
