= Snowbears =

Snowbears may refer to:

- Utah Snowbears
- Magic City Snowbears
