= Dickie Dee =

Canadian ice cream brand

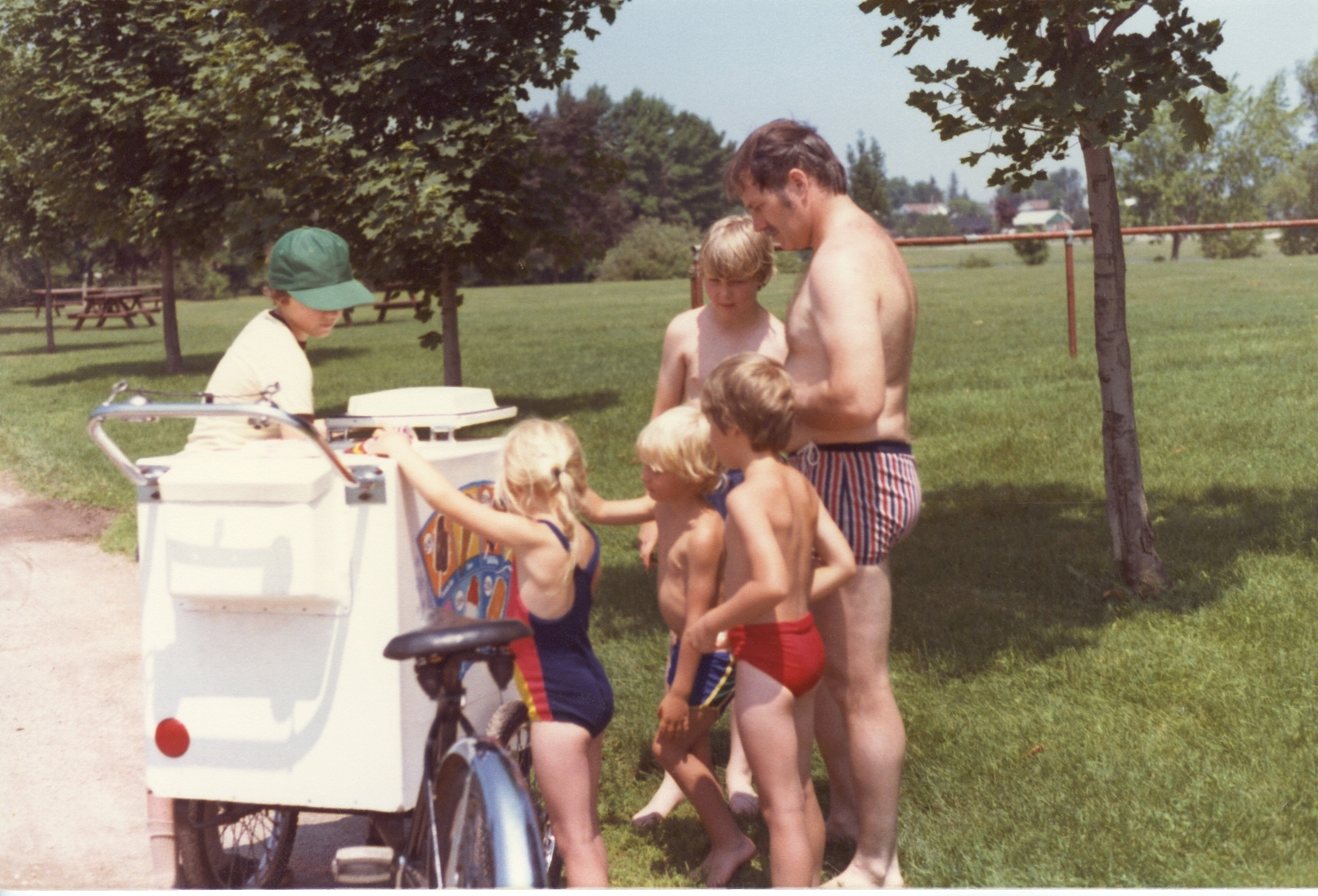
- Dickie Dee vendor in 1983.
- Industry: Mobile ice cream
- Founded: 1950s
- Founder: Syd Glow
- Headquarters: Winnipeg, Manitoba, Canada
- Owner: The Barish family, 1959–1992; Good Humor-Breyers, 1992–present
- Number of employees: 1500 annually

Dickie Dee is a Canadian brand of ice cream currently owned by Good Humor-Breyers.

== History ==
=== 1950s: Foundation by Syd Glow ===
Dickie Dee started in Winnipeg, Manitoba in the early 1950s; it was owned by Syd Glow.

=== 1959–1992: Barish Family ===
In 1959, Glow sold it to the Barish family, who then grew it to be one of the largest ice cream vending companies in North America. At its peak, Dickie Dee had approximately 1500 operators across Canada and in the Northern United States. Ice cream products were sold out of a fibreglass compartment on a modified tricycle. Dickie Dee also had a fleet of scooters and ice cream trucks, which operated in areas with hills that could not be serviced using the bicycles.

The bicycles were equipped with bells which the operator rang to alert children to their presence.

During the late 1980s and early 1990s Dickie Dee promoted the Richard D's The Ultimate Ice Cream Bar and other products at gas stations and retail outlets in freezers called "Bubble Cabinets". The Richard D's bar was introduced in 1987 as the first gourmet ice cream bar packaged in its own individual box in Canada. The Bubble Cabinets were chest-style display freezers with a clear plastic dome shaped lid, which allowed for viewing the various products.

Dickie Dee maintained a network of distributors to operate its equipment. Distributors leased the equipment and purchased the products from designated company suppliers. Small distributorships were turn-key operations that could be run from a family garage, while larger centres had warehouses and yards.

=== Since 1992: Unilever ===
In 1992 Dickie Dee was sold to Unilever and became a division of Good Humor-Breyers. Good Humor-Breyers maintained the Dickie Dee brand and program from offices in Oakville, Ontario until 2002. Today much of the remaining equipment is privately owned by former distributors who are still selling ice cream products as independent operators under a variety of names.
