= RiverCentre =

Convention center located in Saint Paul, Minnesota, USA

Coordinates: 44°56′38″N 93°5′58″W

Saint Paul RiverCentre
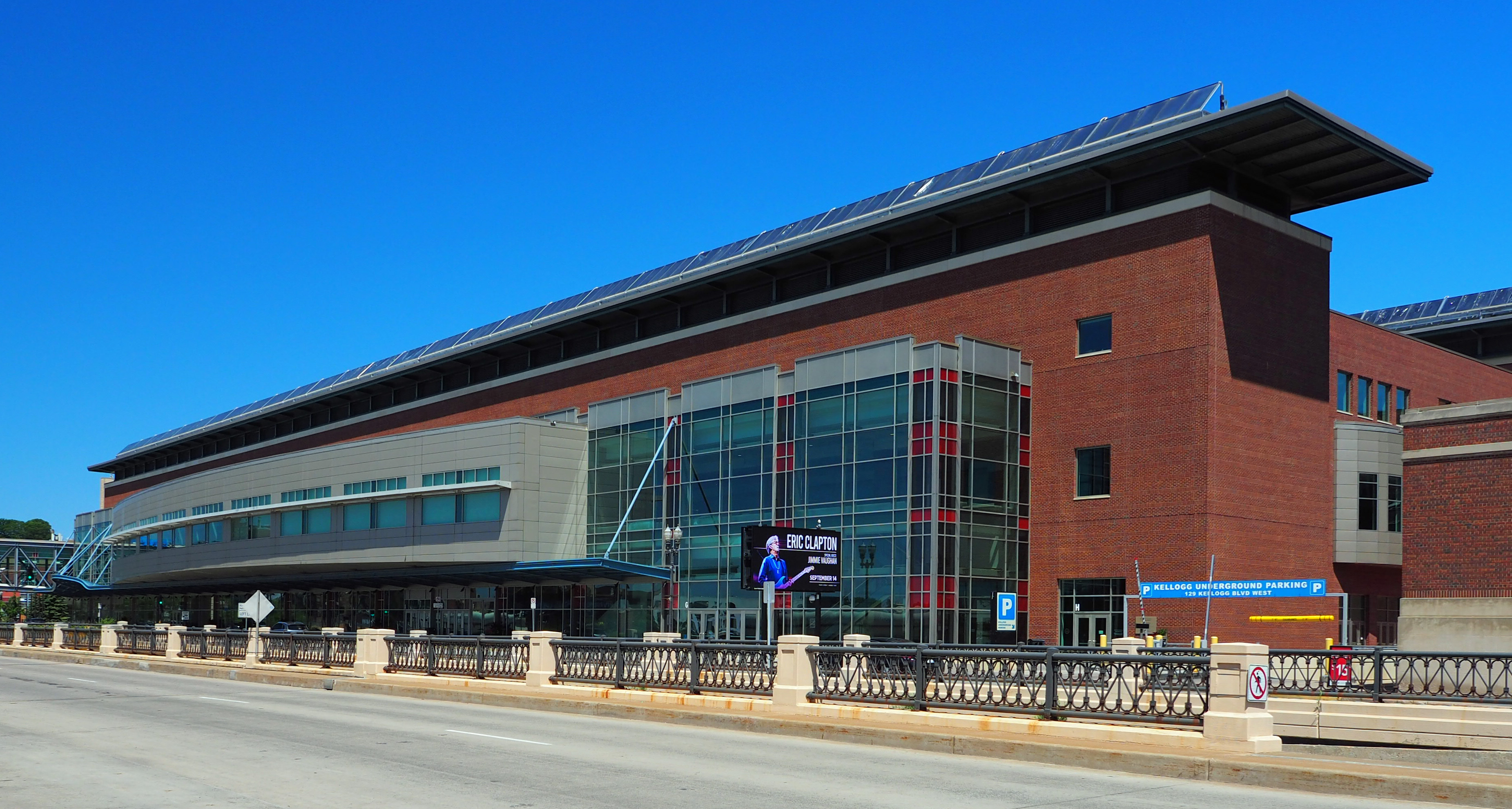
- RiverCentre viewed from the southeast
- Address: 175 Kellogg Boulevard West
- Location: Saint Paul, Minnesota, U.S.
- Owner: City of Saint Paul
- Operator: Saint Paul Arena Company

Construction
- Opened: May 1998
- Construction cost: $85 million ($170 million in 2025 dollars)

Website
- rivercentre.org

Saint Paul RiverCentre is a convention center in Saint Paul, Minnesota. Designed by Hammel Green and Abrahamson, Inc. (HGA), the venue opened in 1998 to complement the Roy Wilkins Auditorium and St. Paul Civic Center. Shortly after RiverCentre opened, the Civic Center was demolished and ground was broken to build Xcel Energy Center, now Grand Casino Arena. Since then, RiverCentre has hosted events of many types.

== Noted events ==
- 2004 National Hockey League All-Star FANtasy Event
- 2008 Republican National Convention Media Headquarters
- 2018 Taste of the NFL's Annual Party with a Purpose
- 2018 NFL Media Day Site
- 2025–2026 Bold North Breakaway
- Multiple visits by U.S. presidents and other world dignitaries
- Medtronic Twin Cities Marathon Health & Fitness Expo
- Hmong New Year
- Let's Play Hockey Expo
- Minnesota State High School League Girls Gymnastics State Meet
- Saint Paul Ice Fishing & Winter Sports Show
- Donnie Smith Bike Show
- Minnesota Dental Association Star of the North Meeting
- LeadingAge Minnesota Institute & Expo
