= Antonio Reynolds-Dean =

American basketball player and coach

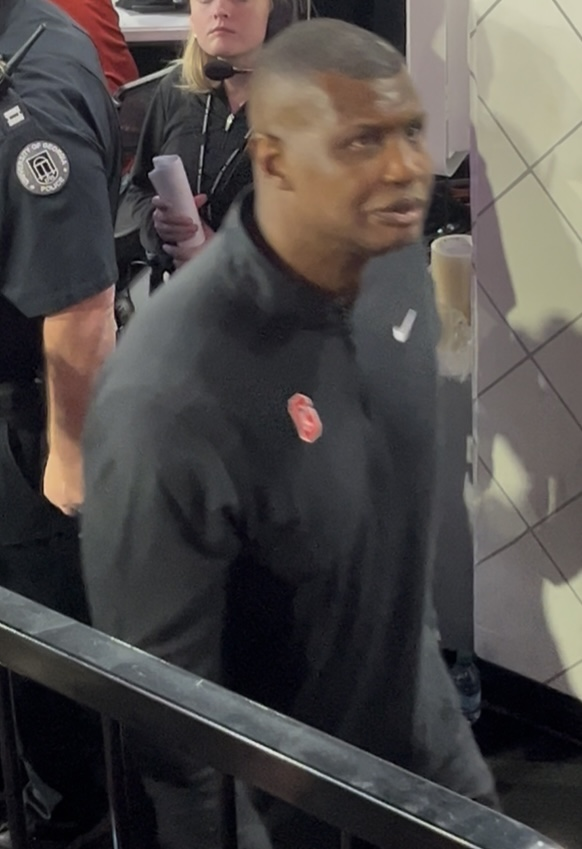
- Reynolds-Dean in 2025

Georgia Bulldogs
- Title: Associate head coach
- League: Southeastern Conference

Personal information
- Born: March 11, 1977 (age 49) Marietta, Georgia, U.S.
- Listed height: 6 ft 7 in (2.01 m)
- Listed weight: 220 lb (100 kg)

Career information
- High school: Douglass (Atlanta, Georgia)
- College: Rhode Island (1995–1999)
- NBA draft: 1999: undrafted
- Playing career: 1999–2008
- Position: Forward / center
- Coaching career: 2009–present

Career history

Playing
- 1999: Estudiantes de Bahía Blanca
- 1999: Dakota Wizards
- 2000: Florida Sea Dragons
- 2000: Brooklyn Kings
- 2000–2001: Murcia
- 2001–2002: Manresa
- 2002–2004: Murcia
- 2004–2005: CAI Zaragoza
- 2005–2006: Drac Inca
- 2006: Plus Pujol Lleida
- 2007: Ciudad de Huelva
- 2007–2008: Quilmes de Mar del Plata
- 2008: Boca Juniors

Coaching
- 2009–2014: Northeastern (assistant)
- 2014–2015: College of Charleston (assistant)
- 2015–2017: Rhode Island (assistant)
- 2017–2022: Clemson (assistant)
- 2022–present: Georgia (Associate head coach)

Career highlights
- Liga Española de Baloncesto champion (2003); 2× Liga Española de Baloncesto All-Star (2001, 2002); IBA Rookie of the Year (2000); First-team All-IBA (2000); IBA rebounding leader (2000); Third-team All-Atlantic 10 (1999); Atlantic 10 Rookie of the Year (1996)

Antonio de Andre Reynolds-Dean (born March 11, 1977) is an American basketball coach and former professional player, currently serving as associate head coach for the Georgia Bulldogs. A forward/center listed at 6-foot-7, he played college basketball at Rhode Island for 4 years, being named Atlantic 10 Rookie of the Year in his first season and ending his career with 1,576 points and 1,028 rebounds, one of three players to pass the 1,000 mark in both points and rebounds for the Rams. After going undrafted in the 1999 NBA draft he started his professional career with a brief stint in Argentina and then moved to the IBA where he led the league in rebounding and was named Rookie of the Year. He then played in Spain, mainly in the Liga Española de Baloncesto where he ranks top 10 in total rebounds (8th with 1,697) and blocks (4th with 268). He ended his career in 2008 in Argentina and started coaching: he has worked as an assistant coach for Northeastern, College of Charleston and Rhode Island before joining Clemson. In 2015 he was inducted in the University of Rhode Island Athletics Hall of Fame.

== High school career ==
Reynolds-Dean was born in Marietta, Georgia and lived in the westside of Atlanta where he attended Douglass High School; during his high school years he was known as Antonio Reynolds. A member of the varsity basketball team since his sophomore year, Douglass became a state-ranked player during his junior year: he averaged 23 points, 13 rebounds and 5 blocks per game and was named in the All-State second team by The Atlanta Constitution.

USA Today ranked him among the top players of the state of Georgia going into his senior year. In his last season in high school he averaged 24.6 points, 15.5 rebounds, 4.4 assists, 5.1 blocks and 2 steals per game, and again was a second-team all-state selection.

== College career ==
Reynolds-Dean signed to play for Rhode Island and coach Al Skinner put him in the starting lineup for his freshman season. He started all 34 games and averaged 12.1 points, 8.7 rebounds, 1.6 assists and 1.7 blocks per game: he was second on his team in scoring behind guard Tyson Wheeler and he led the Rams in rebounding and blocks. He was second in the Atlantic 10 in total rebounds with 297 and 5th in rebounds per game with 8.7, and 2nd in total blocks (4th in blocks per game) with 59. His performance during the season earned him the Atlantic 10 Rookie of the Year award. As a sophomore Reynolds-Dean averaged 11.5 points, 8,4 rebounds, 1.8 assists and 1.7 blocks per game, again leading the team in rebounding and blocks, and ranked third in scoring behind Wheeler and Cuttino Mobley: he also ranked third in assists per game. Again he started all of his 30 games and played 30.6 minutes per game, and was named in the Atlantic 10 All-Defensive Team.

In 1997 he changed his name, adding Dean (his mother's last name) and creating a hyphenated surname. Jim Harrick was appointed head coach of the Rhode Island Rams for the 1997–98 season, and Reynolds-Dean retained his spot in the starting lineup: he played 34 games, shooting a career-high 50.5% from the field and averaged 11.2 points, 7.6 rebounds, 1.9 assists and 2.5 blocks per game. He ranked 2nd in the conference in blocks per game and in total blocks with 85, which also ranked him 9th in the whole NCAA Division I. The Rams reached the Elite Eight during the 1998 NCAA tournament: Reynolds-Dean recorded 10 rebounds and 8 points in the 79–77 loss against the Stanford Cardinal. Reynolds-Dean's senior year at Rhode Island saw him rank second in his team in scoring, rebounding and blocks behind Lamar Odom: Reynolds-Dean recorded career-highs in points per game (13.2), minutes per game (32.6) and assists per game (2.6) while also shooting a career-best 72.1% from the free throw line. The Rams went on to win the Atlantic 10 Tournament in the final game against Temple.

Reynolds-Dean ended his career at Rhode Island with 1,576 total points (11th all-time), 1,028 rebounds (3rd), 235 blocks (3rd) and started all of his 131 games with the Rams.

=== College statistics ===
Year	Team	GP	GS	MPG	FG%	3P%	FT%	RPG	APG	SPG	BPG	PPG
1995–96	Rhode Island	34	34	30.9	.466	.000	.632	8.7	1.6	1.1	1.7	12.1
1996–97	Rhode Island	30	30	30.6	.500	.000	.691	8.4	1.8	1.3	1.7	11.5
1997–98	Rhode Island	34	34	30.6	.505	.000	.677	7.6	1.9	1.1	2.5	11.2
1998–99	Rhode Island	33	33	32.6	.465	.308	.721	6.7	2.6	0.9	1.2	13.2
Career		131	131	31.2	.482	.190	.679	7.8	2.0	1.1	1.8	12.0

== Professional career ==
After the end of his senior season, Reynolds-Dean was automatically eligible for the 1999 NBA draft, but he was not selected by an NBA franchise. He participated in the pre-draft camp held in Chicago, where he was measured at 6 ft 5 in without shoes. He was selected as the 38th overall pick in the USBL draft by the New Jersey Shore Cats, he was the 30th pick in the CBA draft by the Idaho Stampede, and was also selected by the San Diego Stingrays in the 1999 IBL draft. He played 1 game in the Liga Nacional de Básquet for Estudiantes de Bahía Blanca in Argentina before joining the Idaho Stampede in the CBA, where he did not debut. In November 1999 he signed for the Dakota Wizards and played the 1999–2000 IBA season, where he averaged 18.7 points and 12.2 rebounds per game, leading the league in rebounding. At the end of the season he was an All-IBA First Team selection and was named the IBA Rookie of the Year. During the spring of 2000 he joined the USBL signing for the Florida Sea Dragons (1 appearance) and then for the Brooklyn Kings.

In September 2000 he moved to Europe and joined Spanish team CB Murcia, and in 30 games in the Liga Española de Baloncesto (the second tier of Spanish basketball) he averaged 18.2 points and 8.2 rebounds in 31.3 minutes per game. He then transferred to Manresa for the following season and played 30 games in the regular season with averages of 15.3 points and 8.2 rebounds in 30.2 minutes, and 10 playoff games during which he averaged 11.5 points and 4.8 rebounds in 24.2 minutes per game. In September 2002 he came back to Murcia and in 30 regular season games he recorded 16.6 points and 8.9 rebounds in 34.1 minutes per game during the regular season: in 9 playoff games he averaged 16.0 points and 9.1 rebs in 31 minutes per game and won the league title, gaining the promotion in the Liga ACB. In the top level of Spanish basketball Reynolds-Dean played 34 games (31 starts) averaging 12.5 points and 6.5 rebounds in 27 minutes per game: at the end of the season Murcia was relegated. In 2004 Reynolds-Dean joined CAI Zaragoza, going back to the second level, and in 34 games he averaged 15.6 points and 8.1 rebounds in 30.2 min per game for the regular season, and in playoffs he recorded 3 appearances with averages of 11.3 points, 6.3 rebounds in 29.2 minutes. In 2005–06 he played for Drac Inca (34 games, 16.1 points and 8.2 rebounds). He started the 2006–07 season with Plus Pujol Lleida, where he played 17 games, and in 20.5 minutes he posted averages of 8.9 points and 4.7 rebounds; he moved mid-season and on January 2, 2007, he joined Ciudad de Huelva, where he played the remaining 17 games of the regular season (25.5 minutes, 11.7 points, 5.4 rebs) and 7 playoff games (9.6 points in 26.2 minutes).

He then moved to Argentina, and played 36 games for Quilmes before being cut due to a knee injury. He ended his career with Boca Juniors, where he played 4 games averaging 3.8 points and 0.8 rebounds in 11.3 minutes per game.

In 2012 he was selected in the Dakota Wizards All-Time Team.

== Coaching career ==
After retiring from his professional playing career, Reynolds-Dean took a job as director of basketball operation for the Fairfield Stags, working for head coach Ed Cooley. He then became an assistant coach at Northeastern for Bill Coen and held the position until 2014, when he joined College of Charleston, where the head coach was Earl Grant. In 2015 he joined coach Dan Hurley at Rhode Island and was an assistant coach for the Rams for two seasons before moving to Clemson in 2017. In 2022, Antonio Reynolds Dean left Clemson, and accepted an Associate head coaching job at Georgia under head coach Mike White.

== Personal life ==
He is married with Johanna and has two daughters, Jasmine and Naomi. He earned a bachelor's degree in education from the University of Rhode Island and a master's degree in sports leadership from Northwestern University.
