= Rob Spon =

Professional basketball coach

Tri-City Tide
- Position: Head coach

Personal information
- Born: July 4, 1962 (age 64)

Career information
- High school: Hickory (Hermitage, Pennsylvania)
- Coaching career: 1995–present

Career history

Coaching
- 1995–1997: Thiel College
- 1998–2000: Magic City Snowbears
- 2000–2001: Saskatchewan Hawks
- 2005: Youngstown Wildcats
- 2005: Wichita Bombers
- 2005–2006: Dakota Wizards (asst.)
- 2006–2007: Indiana Alley Cats (asst.)
- 2007: Gary Steelheads (asst.)
- 2008: Gary Steelheads
- 2009: Manchester Millrats
- 2009: Maryland GreenHawks
- 2011–2012: Quebec Kebs
- 2012–2013: Halifax Rainmen
- 2013–2014: Saint John Mill Rats
- 2014–2015: Rochester RazorSharks
- 2015–2017: Saint John Mill Rats/Riptide
- 2017–2018: Cape Breton Highlanders
- 2024-2025: Tri-City Tide

Career highlights
- 2× PBL Coach of the Year (2011, 2015)

Robert Spon (born July 4, 1962) is an American professional basketball coach, most recently serving as the head coach for the Cape Breton Highlanders of the National Basketball League of Canada (NBL Canada). He has previously led the Rochester RazorSharks, the Halifax Rainmen, Saint John Mill Rats/Riptide, and several other minor league teams in the past. Spon also has experience coaching the Dakota Wizards, Indiana Alleycats, and Pittsburgh Xplosion in the Continental Basketball Association.

== Coaching career ==
In 2015, Spon led the Rochester RazorSharks to an undefeated season and a Premier Basketball League championship. Following the season, on May 7, he was named head coach of the Saint John Mill Rats, where he had previously served. The Mill Rats' ownership changed in 2016 but retained Spon as coach. The team was then renamed to the Saint John Riptide. After one more season in Saint John, he was then hired for one season by the NBL Canada's Cape Breton Highlanders as their head coach.
