= Maurice Baker =

American basketball player (born 1979)

Indiana Pacers
- Title: Assistant coach
- League: NBA

Personal information
- Born: July 28, 1979 (age 47) Madison, Illinois, U.S.
- Listed height: 6 ft 1 in (1.85 m)
- Listed weight: 185 lb (84 kg)

Career information
- High school: Madison (Madison, Illinois)
- College: Utah Tech (1998–2000); Oklahoma State (2000–2002)
- NBA draft: 2002: undrafted
- Playing career: 2002–2016
- Position: Point guard
- Coaching career: 2022–present

Career history

Playing
- 2002–2003: Avtodor Saratov
- 2004: Al-Ittihad
- 2004: Correcaminos Matamoros
- 2004–2012: Dakota Wizards
- 2005: Los Angeles Clippers
- 2005: Portland Trail Blazers
- 2006: Lietuvos Rytas
- 2008: Paris-Levallois
- 2009: Atléticos de San Germán
- 2010: Indios de Mayagüez
- 2010: Ola Verde de Poza Rica
- 2011: Talk 'N Text Tropang Texters
- 2011: Guaiqueríes de Margarita
- 2012: Cañeros del Este
- 2012–2016: Santa Cruz Warriors

Coaching
- 2022–present: Indiana Pacers (assistant)

Career highlights
- LNB champion (2012); NBA Development League champion (2007, 2015); NBA Development League All-Star (2009); Baltic League champion (2006); LKL champion (2006); CBA All-Star (2006); All-CBA First Team (2005); CBA All-Star Game (2006); Big 12 Newcomer of the Year (2001)
- Stats at NBA.com
- Stats at Basketball Reference

Maurice Baker (born July 28, 1979) is an American professional basketball coach and former player. He last played for the Santa Cruz Warriors of the NBA Development League. He played college basketball for Dixie State College and Oklahoma State University, and has spent time in the NBA with the Los Angeles Clippers and the Portland Trail Blazers. He has also played professionally in Russia, Syria, Mexico, Lithuania, France, Puerto Rico, Philippines, Venezuela, and the Dominican Republic.

Baker played his longest tenure with the Santa Cruz Warriors, starting with the 2004 season when the team was known as the Dakota Wizards in the Continental Basketball Association before the team moved to the NBA Development League in 2006. Baker has appeared in the second-most D-League games (356) in league history, and is the Warriors' franchise all-time leader in points, minutes played, rebounds, assists, steals, and field goals made.

== Professional career ==
Over his first two professional seasons, between 2002 and 2004, Baker played in Russia, Syria and Mexico. His first stint in the United States came during the 2004–05 season, when he joined the Dakota Wizards of the Continental Basketball Association. After averaging 16.9 points, 6.7 assists and 5.4 rebounds in 30 games for Dakota, he was called up to the NBA by the Los Angeles Clippers in February 2005. The following month, he garnered another NBA stint, this time with the Portland Trail Blazers. Over two 10-day contract periods with the Clippers and Trail Blazers, Baker appeared in five games with limited court time.

Baker's 10-day contract with the Trail Blazers ended up being his final playing time in the NBA, as the rest of his professional basketball career was played in the D-League and overseas. His final game was played on March 19, 2005, in a 92 - 97 loss to the Orlando Magic where he only played for 5 seconds and recorded no stats.

Baker returned to the Dakota Wizards for the 2005–06 season, playing with them until January 2006 when he moved to Lithuania to play for Lietuvos Rytas. In 12 league games for Rytas, he averaged 6.5 points, 3.2 rebounds, 2.1 assists and 1.7 steals per game.

In the summer of 2006, Baker underwent ankle surgery, and was deemed "about 80 percent of the player he was before" the surgery. For the 2006–07 season, Baker returned to the Dakota Wizards, with the team now playing in the NBA Development League. In their first D-League season, Baker helped the Wizards win the championship, leading the team in rebounds with ten while scoring nineteen points in the Championship game against the Colorado 14ers. He again played for Dakota in 2007–08, departing the team in January 2008 to join Paris-Levallois of the LNB Pro A.

In 2008–09, Baker again played in the NBA Development League for the Dakota Wizards, earning All-Star honors for the first time. Following the season with Dakota, Baker moved to Puerto Rico for the 2009 BSN season, joining Atléticos de San Germán. He returned to Dakota for the 2009–10 season, before again playing in Puerto Rico in the off-season, this time joining Indios de Mayagüez.

For the 2010–11 season, Baker moved to Mexico where he played for Ola Verde de Poza Rica. In January 2011, he returned to the Dakota Wizards for the rest of the season. He later had stints in the Philippines for the Talk 'N Text Tropang Texters, and in Venezuela for Guaiqueríes de Margarita.

Baker again played for the Dakota Wizards in 2011–12. He then played in the Dominican Republic during the 2012 off-season for Cañeros del Este.

In 2012, the Wizards were moved from North Dakota to California by their NBA affiliate team, the Golden State Warriors. The team was subsequently renamed the Santa Cruz Warriors, and Baker continued on with Santa Cruz. Between 2012 and 2016, Baker was a consistent presence on the Santa Cruz roster, earning his second D-League championship in the 2014–15 season.

== Coaching career ==
Prior to the start of the 2022–23 NBA season, Baker was hired as an assistant coach for the Indiana Pacers under head coach Rick Carlisle.

== NBA career statistics ==
Legend
GP	Games played	GS	Games started	MPG	Minutes per game
FG%	Field goal percentage	3P%	3-point field goal percentage	FT%	Free throw percentage
RPG	Rebounds per game	APG	Assists per game	SPG	Steals per game
BPG	Blocks per game	PPG	Points per game	**Bold**	Career high

=== Regular season ===
Year	Team	GP	GS	MPG	FG%	3P%	FT%	RPG	APG	SPG	BPG	PPG
2004–05	L.A. Clippers	1	0	1.0	.000	.000	.000	.0	.0	.0	.0	.0
2004–05	Portland	**4**	0	**4.5**	.000	.000	.000	**.5**	**.3**	**.3**	.0	.0
Career		5	0	3.8	.000	.000	.000	.4	.2	.2	.0	.0
