= Youngstown Hawks =

- League: International Basketball Association
- Established: 1998
- Folded: 2002
- History: Mansfield Hawks (1998–99); Youngstown Hawks (1999–00); Saskatchewan Hawks (2000–02)
- Arena: South Field House
- Location: Youngstown, Ohio
- General manager: Ted Stepien
- Ownership: Ted Stepien

The Youngstown Hawks were an American International Basketball Association team based in Youngstown, Ohio, from 1999 to 2000. The team was owned by former Cleveland Cavaliers owner Ted Stepien, who moved the team to Youngstown from Mansfield. The Hawks struggled to gain traction in Youngstown, with controversies over where the team hosted games and whether or not it had liquor permits, which forced the team to stop selling beer at games. After compiling a 4–15 record, Stepien sold a majority share of the team to Tom Tao, and the team was relocated to Saskatoon, Canada, where it became the Saskatchewan Hawks.
