= Roy Wilkins Auditorium =

Multi-purpose arena in Minnesota, United States

- The Roy
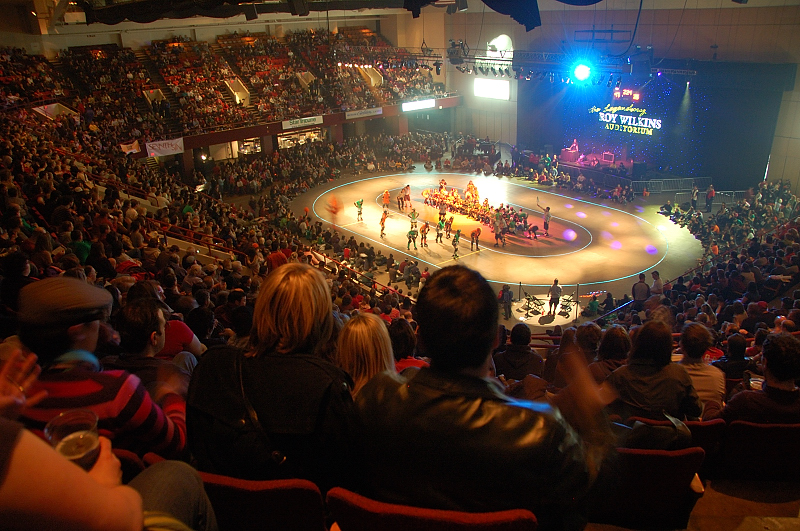
- A Minnesota Roller Derby game in Roy Wilkins Auditorium
- Interactive map of Roy Wilkins Auditorium
- Former names: St. Paul Auditorium (1932–1985)
- Address: 175 Kellogg Boulevard West
- Location: Saint Paul, Minnesota, U.S.
- Coordinates: 44°56′41″N 93°05′58″W
- Operator: Minnesota Sports & Entertainment
- Capacity: 5,000

Construction
- Built: 1932
- Architect: Clarence W. Wigington

Tenants
- Minnesota Golden Gophers (NCAA) (1932–1950); Minneapolis Lakers (NBL/BAA/NBA) (1947–1960); St. Paul Lights (NPBL) (1950); St. Paul Saints (IHL) (1959–1963); Minnesota Fighting Saints (WHA) (1972); St. Paul Slam! (IBA) (1996–1998); Minnesota Roller Derby (WFTDA) (2005–present); Minnesota Ripknees (ABA) (2007–2008)

Website
- Venue Website

Roy Wilkins Auditorium (nicknamed The Roy) is a 5,000-seat multi-purpose arena in St. Paul, Minnesota. Designed by the renowned municipal architect Clarence W. Wigington, it was built in 1932 as an arena extension to the existing St. Paul Auditorium (built 1906–1907). When the old auditorium wing was demolished in 1982, Wigington's arena wing remained. It was renamed for Roy Wilkins in 1985. It is part of the RiverCentre complex, down the hall from the Grand Casino Arena, home of the National Hockey League's Minnesota Wild.

== Events ==
The University of Minnesota's Golden Gophers ice hockey team used the arena as one of its home rinks from 1932 until 1950. The Minneapolis Lakers used the Auditorium when their regular home, the Minneapolis Auditorium, was not available. The Minnesota State Boys' High School Hockey Tournament was held at the Auditorium from 1945 to 1968. It was home to the Minnesota Fighting Saints ice hockey team of the World Hockey Association (WHA) in fall 1972, before the team moved to the St. Paul Civic Center. The St. Paul Slam of the International Basketball Association played at Wilkins for two seasons, 1996–97 and 1997–98. The Minnesota Ripknees also played at the auditorium for their 2007–08 season.

The arena frequently hosts for youth athletics including local youth dance competitions and events for the Minnesota State High School League. Notably, many high school graduations have been hosted at the Roy.

The Roy Wilkins Auditorium in St. Paul has a storied history of hosting legendary performers since its opening in 1932. Known for its intimate atmosphere, it has welcomed a wide variety of musical icons across genres like rock, hip-hop, and jazz. The venue has hosted Elvis, Bob Dylan, David Bowie, Bruce Springsteen, and Nirvana. In recent history, notable acts have included Bruno Mars, Paramore, The 1975, The Lumineers, and The Gorillaz. Since the opening of nearby midsized venues like The Armory and Palace Theater, The Roy has seen less use for concerts. The most recent show was Sturgill Simpson.

In March of 2020, Bernie Sanders held a rally at the auditorium.

In 2024, The Roy hosted the PWHL draft. Minnesota's team, The Frost, have their home ice next door and were the winner's of the first ever Walter Cup.

The arena has seen notable use for professional wrestling. On October 1, 2000 it hosted ECW's pay-per-view Anarchy Rulz. On March 26, 2025, All Elite Wrestling held a live episode of their weekly show Dynamite at the arena. Another Dynamite was held there on March 25, 2026. Additionally, several WWE NXT events have been held in the venue.

Since 2005, Roy Wilkins Auditorium has hosted games for the Minnesota Roller Derby league, one of the founding members of the Women's Flat Track Derby Association (WFTDA). The WFTDA held the 2015 WFTDA Championships at Roy Wilkins Auditorium November 6–8, 2015.
