= Earl Barish =

Canadian businessman

- Born: 1943 (age 82–83); Fort William, Ontario
- Occupation: Businessman
- Spouse: Cheryl Barish

Earl Barish (born 1943 in Fort William, Ontario) is a businessman from Winnipeg, Manitoba, Canada. His family developed the Dickie Dee ice cream mobile brand.

He also owned the IBA (the International Basketball Association) team, the Winnipeg Cyclone. Barish also served as league president of the IBA from 1995 to 1999.

In March 2006, Barish was appointed president and CEO of 4328796 Manitoba Ltd. This numbered company was the major shareholder in Salisbury House, a chain of 22 (at the time of Barish's nomination) restaurants in the Winnipeg area. The chain was sold in December 2017 to a partnership that includes restaurateur Noel Bernier, the Metis Economic Development Fund (MEDF), David Filmon, and several senior managers of Salisbury House. In July 2019, it was announced that Barish had purchased Noel Bernier's shares in the Salisbury House chain back less than two years after selling it.

In June 2008, Barish was appointed the chairman of the Board of B'nai Brith Canada.

Barish also served on the executive committee of Maccabi Canada.
