= Damon Jones =

American basketball player and coach (born 1976)

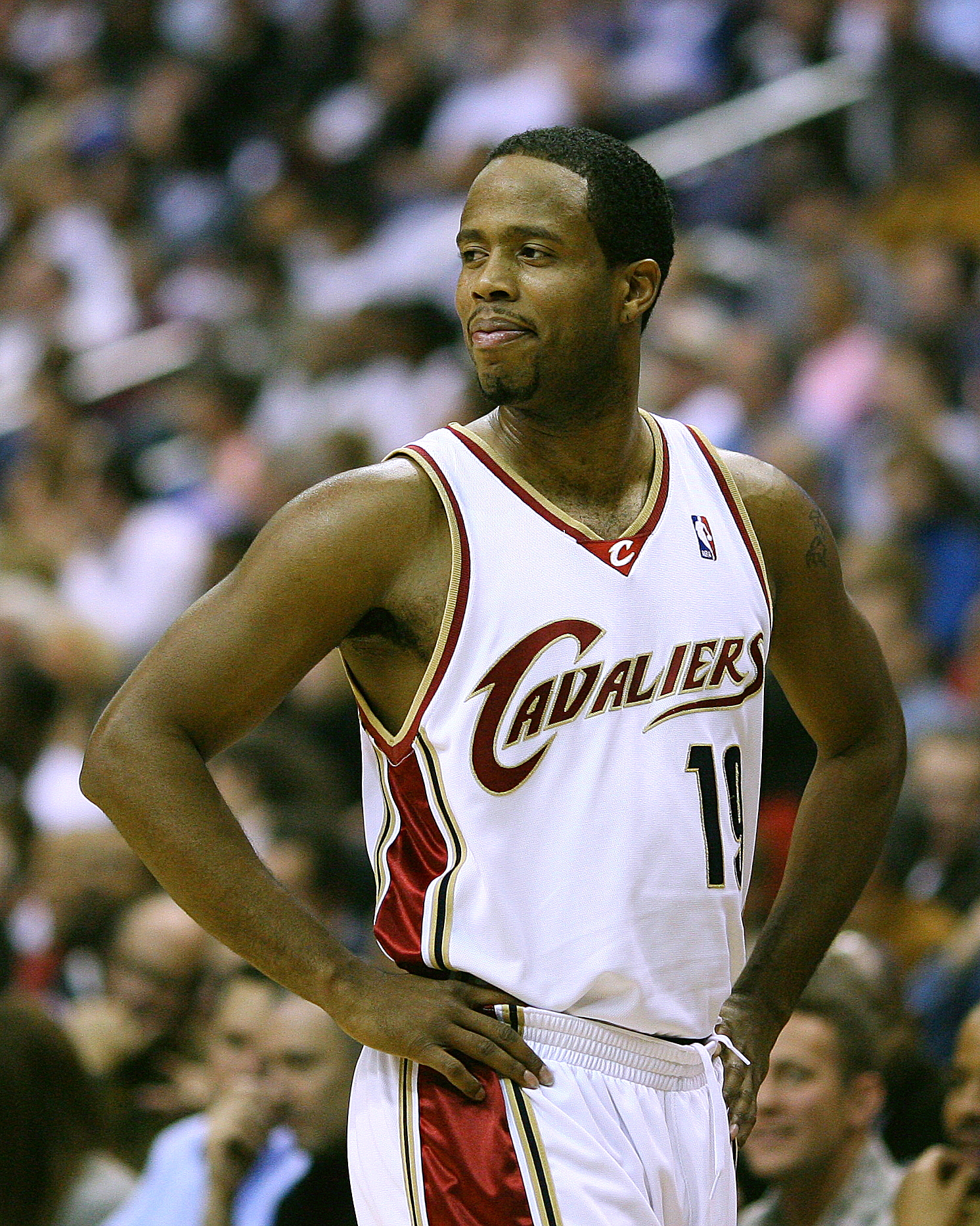
- Jones with the Cleveland Cavaliers in 2006

Personal information
- Born: August 25, 1976 (age 50) Galveston, Texas, U.S.
- Listed height: 6 ft 3 in (1.91 m)
- Listed weight: 195 lb (88 kg)

Career information
- High school: Ball (Galveston, Texas)
- College: Houston (1994–1997)
- NBA draft: 1997: undrafted
- Playing career: 1997–2012
- Position: Point guard / shooting guard
- Number: 9, 13, 11, 14, 19
- Coaching career: 2015–2018

Career history

Playing
- 1997–1998: Black Hills Posse
- 1998: Jacksonville Barracudas
- 1998–1999: Idaho Stampede
- 1999: New Jersey Nets
- 1999: Boston Celtics
- 1999: Golden State Warriors
- 1999–2000: Dallas Mavericks
- 2000: Gulf Coast Sun Dogs
- 2000–2001: Vancouver Grizzlies
- 2001–2002: Detroit Pistons
- 2002–2003: Sacramento Kings
- 2003–2004: Milwaukee Bucks
- 2004–2005: Miami Heat
- 2005–2008: Cleveland Cavaliers
- 2008–2009: Milwaukee Bucks
- 2009: NSB Napoli
- 2010: Piratas de Quebradillas
- 2011: Bucaneros de La Guaira
- 2012: Reno Bighorns

Career highlights
- As player: All-CBA First Team (1999); CBA Newcomer of the Year (1999); CBA scoring champion (1999); IBA Sixth Man of the Year (1998); As assistant coach: NBA champion (2016)

Career NBA statistics
- Points: 4,326 (6.6 ppg)
- Rebounds: 1,074 (1.6 rpg)
- Assists: 1,806 (2.7 apg)
- Stats at NBA.com
- Stats at Basketball Reference

Damon Darron Jones (born August 25, 1976) is an American former professional basketball player best known for playing for the Cleveland Cavaliers of the National Basketball Association (NBA) from 2005 to 2008.

A combo guard, he played college basketball for three years with the Houston Cougars before declaring early for the 1997 NBA draft, but he went undrafted. After his playing career ended, Jones joined the Cavaliers coaching staff.

In October 2025, Jones was arrested by the FBI for his alleged involvement in an illegal gambling scheme.

== Early life ==
Jones played for the Ball High School Golden Tornadoes basketball team. He went on to the University of Houston after his graduation in 1994.

== Professional career ==
A journeyman throughout his career, Jones never played for the same team for more than one season except for 2005–2008, when he played for the Cleveland Cavaliers. In his career, he played for ten different teams.

Jones was most notable for his ability to make three-point field goals. In fact, three-point attempts made up the majority of his field goal attempts because his role was often to wait on the outside while teammates such as Shaquille O'Neal, Dwyane Wade, or LeBron James forced double teams. Jones was supremely confident of his shot, once proclaiming that he is "the best shooter in the world."

=== Early career ===
Jones played for the Idaho Stampede of the Continental Basketball Association (CBA) during the 1998–99 season. He was selected as the CBA Newcomer of the Year and named to the All-CBA First Team.

=== 2004–2005 ===
Prior to the 2004–2005 season, Jones signed a one-year, $2.5 million contract with the Miami Heat. Jones then proceeded to have the best statistical season of his career, setting career highs in games started (66), minutes played (2,576), field goals made (331) and attempted (726), field goal percentage (45.6%), three-point field goals made (225) and attempted (521), three-point field goal percentage (43.2%), free throws made (68) and attempted (86), rebounds (231), steals (44), blocked shots (5) and points scored (955). His 225 three-point field goals made was third best in the NBA (and at the time, tied with Mitch Richmond for the ninth most ever in an NBA season) and his three-point field goal percentage was fifth best that season.

Jones had a career-high 31 points on February 16, 2005, against the Los Angeles Clippers and scored in double figures on 48 occasions. He also had his only game with two blocked shots on March 10, 2005, against the Minnesota Timberwolves. Jones grabbed a career-high eight rebounds on November 6, 2004, against the Washington Wizards, a mark he tied on February 22, 2005, against the Chicago Bulls.

In 15 playoff games, Jones averaged 12.1 points and 4.0 assists, and shot 42.9% from three-point range. He had a career playoff high of 30 points with seven three-point field goals made in Miami's first game of the first round against the New Jersey Nets. Jones scored in double digits during 10 of Miami's 15 playoff games.

=== Cleveland Cavaliers: 2005–2008 ===
Jones departed the Heat to sign a four-year contract worth a reported $16.1 million with the Cleveland Cavaliers on September 8, 2005. In 82 games played (seven starts) during the 2005–06 regular season, Jones averaged 6.7 points and 2.1 assists per game. He shot 37.7% from three-point range. On November 13, 2006, he had a season-high 22 points on a season-high 5 three-point field goals. Jones hit five three-point field goals on four other occasions. On March 8, 2006, Jones hit a game-winning three-point field goal as time expired in a 98–97 victory against the Toronto Raptors.

In the 2006 NBA Playoffs, Jones played in 13 games, averaged 1.8 points and hit 27.8% of his three-pointers. He had a playoff high 8 points in a game four Eastern Conference Semifinal win against the Detroit Pistons.

On May 5, 2006, Jones came off the bench late in Game 6 of the Cavs' Eastern Conference first-round series against the Washington Wizards. In his first minute of the game action, in overtime, he hit the game-winning shot to clinch the series four games to two, and sent the Cavs into the second round of the NBA playoffs for the first time since 1993.

In 60 games played during the 2006–2007 regular season, Jones averaged 6.6 points and 1.6 assists per game. He shot 38.5% from three-point range. On November 13, 2006, he had a season-high 29 points on a season-high 7 three-point field goals.

Jones was selected to participate in the Three-Point Shootout during the 2007 All-Star Weekend in Las Vegas, Nevada. Jones finished in fifth place.

In the 2007 NBA Playoffs, Jones played in 11 games, averaged 2.4 points and hit 31.8% of his three-pointers. He had a playoff high 9 points on three three-point field goals in a game one NBA Final loss to the San Antonio Spurs.

Jones played in 68 regular season games (three starts) for the Cavaliers. He averaged 6.4 points and 1.9 assists and shot 41.7% from three-point range. Jones had a season-high 27 points on a season-high seven three-point field goals in a February 22, 2008, short-handed Cavs victory over the Washington Wizards.

In five playoff games, Jones scored six total points and dished one assist.

On December 28, 2007, it was revealed that the Cavaliers fined Jones and Ira Newble an undisclosed amount of money for refusing to come off the bench during the final minute of their Christmas Day win over the Miami Heat.

=== 2008–2009 ===
On August 13, 2008, Jones was traded to the Milwaukee Bucks in a three-team, six-player deal involving the Bucks, the Cleveland Cavaliers, and the Oklahoma City Thunder that also sent Milwaukee's Mo Williams to Cleveland, Cleveland's Joe Smith and Milwaukee's Desmond Mason to Oklahoma City, and Oklahoma City's Luke Ridnour and Adrian Griffin to Milwaukee.

=== 2010 ===
On March 29, 2010, Jones signed with the Piratas de Quebradillas of the Puerto Rico Basketball League. However, on April 13 he was released, after averaging only 10.7 points in four games played.

=== 2011 ===
In February 2011, he signed with Aliağa Petkim in Turkey, but didn't pass the physical fitness test and was released.

=== 2012 ===
After a stint with the Reno Bighorns of the NBA Development League (NBA D-League), Jones retired from playing in 2012.

== Coaching career ==
In 2014, Jones became a part of the coaching staff for the Cleveland Cavaliers with the title of "shooting consultant," working with both the Cavaliers and their NBADL affiliate the Canton Charge. During the 2015–16 season, Jones served as an assistant coach with the Charge.

In April 2016, Cavaliers head coach Tyronn Lue added Jones to his coaching staff for the 2016 NBA Playoffs. The Cavaliers went on to win the championship over the Golden State Warriors in seven games, being the first team to overcome a 3–1 deficit. In September 2016, Jones was promoted to the full-time role of assistant coach for the Cavaliers. In March 2018, Cavaliers shooting guard J.R. Smith threw a bowl of soup at Jones and was suspended for one game by the team.

== Records, milestones and rankings ==
- Ranked third in the NBA in three-point field goals made (225) in 2004–2005.
- Ranked 5th in the NBA in three-point field goal percentage (43.2%) in 2004–2005.
- Led the NBA in "True Shooting Percentage" (62.5%) in 2004–2005.

== Personal life ==
Jones majored in sociology at the University of Houston. Jones has a child with former WNBA star and Women's Basketball Hall of Famer Tina Thompson. In January 2006, Jones became the first NBA player to sign with a Chinese shoe company when he signed a two-year contract with Li-Ning.

=== Gambling investigation ===
On October 23, 2025, Jones, Miami Heat player Terry Rozier, and Portland Trail Blazers head coach Chauncey Billups were arrested in connection with a federal investigation into sports betting and gambling. While the exact charges are not known as of yet, FBI director Kash Patel is expected to hold a press conference to speak on additional possible charges and arrests.

On April 28, 2026, Jones pleaded guilty to two federal counts. He pleaded guilty to conspiracy to commit wire fraud in the NBA insider trading case and to one count in the rigged poker game ring. He became the first of 34 defendants in the case to plead guilty.

== NBA career statistics ==
Legend
GP	Games played	GS	Games started	MPG	Minutes per game
FG%	Field goal percentage	3P%	3-point field goal percentage	FT%	Free throw percentage
RPG	Rebounds per game	APG	Assists per game	SPG	Steals per game
BPG	Blocks per game	PPG	Points per game	**Bold**	Career high
*	Led the league

=== Regular season ===
Year	Team	GP	GS	MPG	FG%	3P%	FT%	RPG	APG	SPG	BPG	PPG
1998–99	New Jersey	11	0	11.9	.318	.345	**.846**	1.2	1.2	**.6**	.0	4.5
1998–99	Boston	13	0	16.4	.387	.455	.750	2.4	2.2	.5	.0	5.8
1999–00	Golden State	13	1	15.1	**.463**	**.478**	.778	1.2	3.0	.5	.0	5.2
1999–00	Dallas	42	0	9.9	.357	.330	.641	.9	1.4	.3	.0	3.9
2000–01	Vancouver	71	10	19.9	.409	.364	.712	1.7	3.2	.5	.0	6.5
2001–02	Detroit	67	0	16.2	.401	.371	.729	1.5	2.1	.3	.0	5.1
2002–03	Sacramento	49	1	14.5	.381	.364	.741	1.4	1.6	.4	**.1**	4.6
2003–04	Milwaukee	**82**	26	24.6	.401	.359	.764	2.1	**5.8**	.4	.0	7.0
2004–05	Miami	**82**	**66**	**31.4**	.456	.432	.791	**2.8**	4.3	.5	**.1**	**11.6**
2005–06	Cleveland	**82***	7	25.5	.387	.377	.640	1.6	2.1	.5	.0	6.7
2006–07	Cleveland	60	0	19.6	.386	.385	.682	1.1	1.6	.3	.0	6.6
2007–08	Cleveland	67	3	19.9	.416	.417	.714	1.1	1.9	.3	.0	6.5
2008–09	Milwaukee	18	0	6.0	.324	.393	.000	.3	.4	.2	.0	1.8
Career		657	114	20.5	.407	.390	.727	1.6	2.7	.4	.0	6.6

=== Playoffs ===
Year	Team	GP	GS	MPG	FG%	3P%	FT%	RPG	APG	SPG	BPG	PPG
2002	Detroit	10	0	18.1	.381	.296	.750	2.1	2.5	.5	.0	4.3
2004	Milwaukee	5	5	28.8	**.529**	**.476**	.667	**4.0**	**7.4**	**1.0**	.0	10.0
2005	Miami	**15**	**15**	**33.2**	.481	.429	.600	2.7	4.0	.5	.0	**12.1**
2006	Cleveland	13	0	13.9	.308	.278	.750	1.2	.9	.2	.0	1.8
2007	Cleveland	11	0	12.6	.308	.318	**1.000**	.8	1.0	.0	.0	2.4
2008	Cleveland	5	0	5.2	.200	.286	.000	.0	.2	.0	.0	1.2
Career		59	20	19.8	.427	.382	.660	1.8	2.5	.3	.0	5.6
