= 1987 McDonald's All-American Boys Game =

American high school basketball game

East	West
118	110
	1st half	2nd half	Total
East	66	52	118
West	52	58	110
- Date: April 12, 1987
- Venue: The Spectrum, Philadelphia, Pennsylvania
- MVP: Mark Macon
- Referees: 1; 2; 3
- Attendance: 10,156
- Network: ABC

McDonald's All-American

The 1987 McDonald's All-American Boys Game was an all-star basketball game played on Sunday, April 12, 1987 at the Spectrum in Philadelphia, Pennsylvania. The game's rosters featured the best and most highly recruited high school boys graduating in 1987. The game was the 10th annual version of the McDonald's All-American Game first played in 1978.

== 1987 game ==
The game was telecast live by ABC. The rosters notably had many forwards: the East had Brian Shorter and Perry Carter, while the West had Larry Johnson and Marcus Liberty, two of the top-ranked prospects of their class. The game saw the East gaining and advantage during the first half, and at halftime the score was 66–52. The West attempted to come back during the second half, but they were unable to outscore the East and eventually lost the game by 10 points. Shorter, who was attending Oak Hill Academy but was born in Philadelphia, scored 24 points and recorded 8 rebounds, while Marcus Liberty scored 18 points; Larry Johnson had 16 and Mark Macon scored 14. Macon's good overall performance earned him the MVP award. Of the 25 players, 15 went on to play at least one game in the NBA.

=== East roster ===
No.	Name	Height	Weight	Position	Hometown	High school	College of Choice
–	Perry Carter	6-8	235	F	Pittsfield, ME, U.S.	Maine Central Institute	Ohio State
–	Chris Corchiani	6-0	178	G	Hialeah, FL, U.S.	Hialeah-Miami Lakes	NC State
–	John Crotty	6-1	180	G	Lincroft, NJ, U.S.	Christian Brothers Academy	Virginia
–	Greg Koubek	6-6	205	F	Clifton Park, NY, U.S.	Shenendehowa	Duke
–	Eric Manuel	6-6	195	G	Macon, GA, U.S.	Southwest	Kentucky
–	Bobby Martin	6-9	235	F / C	Atlantic City, NJ, U.S.	Atlantic City	Pitt
–	Rodney Monroe	6-3	170	G	Hagerstown, MD, U.S.	St. Maria Goretti	NC State
–	King Rice	6-0	180	G	Binghamton, NY, U.S.	Binghamton	North Carolina
–	Dennis Scott	6-6	210	G / F	Oakton, VA, U.S.	Flint Hill College Prep	Georgia Tech
–	Brian Shorter	6-7	215	F	Mouth of Wilson, VA, U.S.	Oak Hill Academy	Pitt
–	Elmore Spencer	6-11	268	C	Atlanta, GA, U.S.	Booker T. Washington	Georgia
–	Anthony Tucker	6-8	215	F	Washington, D.C., U.S.	McKinley	Georgetown
–	David White	6-6	223	F	St. Petersburg, FL, U.S.	Boca Ciega	Florida State

=== West roster ===
No.	Name	Height	Weight	Position	Hometown	High school	College of Choice
–	Jay Edwards	6-4	170	G	Marion, IN, U.S.	Marion	Indiana
–	Jerome Harmon	6-4	180	G	Gary, IN, U.S.	Lew Wallace	Undecided
–	Bill Heppner	6-9	220	F	Crystal Lake, IL, U.S.	Crystal Lake Central	DePaul
–	Sean Higgins	6-9	220	F	Los Angeles, CA, U.S.	Fairfax	Michigan
–	Larry Johnson	6-7	230	F	Dallas, TX, U.S.	Skyline	SMU
–	Treg Lee	6-9	210	F	Cleveland, OH, U.S.	St. Joseph	Ohio State
–	Marcus Liberty	6-8	205	F	Chicago, IL, U.S.	Martin Luther King	Illinois
–	Mark Macon	6-4	185	G	Saginaw, MI, U.S.	Buena Vista	Temple
–	Mike Maddox	6-8	195	F	Oklahoma City, OK, U.S.	Putnam City North	Kansas
–	Elliot Perry	6-0	150	G	Memphis, TN, U.S.	Treadwell	Memphis State
–	LaBradford Smith	6-4	205	G	Bay City, TX, U.S.	Bay City	Louisville
–	Brian Williams	6-10	235	C	Santa Monica, California, U.S.	Saint Monica Catholic	Maryland

=== Coaches ===
The East team was coached by:

- Head Coach Mark Levin of Overbrook High School (Philadelphia, Pennsylvania)

The West team was coached by:

- Head Coach Dave Lebo of Carlisle High School (Carlisle, Pennsylvania)

== All-American Week ==
=== Contest winners ===
- The 1987 Slam Dunk contest was won by Jerome Harmon.
