= Des Moines Dragons =

American basketball team

- League: IBA
- Founded: 1997
- Dissolved: 2001
- Arena: Iowa Veterans Memorial Auditorium
- Team colors: green, blue, white
- Head coach: Glenn Duhon (1997–2000); Michael Born (2000–01)
- Ownership: Paul Miller and Dick Giesen
- Championships: 1 2000
- Conference titles: 2 2000, 2001
- Division titles: 2 2000, 2001

The Des Moines Dragons were a minor league basketball team in the International Basketball Association. They were located in Des Moines, Iowa, and played at the Iowa Veterans Memorial Auditorium. The Dragons were owned by Paul Miller, and Dick Giesen. The Des Moines Dragons were the International Basketball Association champions in 2000 and the runner-up in 2001 to the Dakota Wizards. They played in the IBA from the 1997–1998 season until the end of the 2000–2001 season. The Dragons were coached by Glenn Duhon from 1997 through 2000 and Michael Born from 2000 through 2001. The Dragons played their home games at Veterans Auditorium from 1997 through 2001. In 2000 Lonnie Cooper received the IBA Playoffs MVP. Lonnie Cooper of the Dragons received the 2001 IBA MVP as well as the IBA Finals MVP award. Also in 2001 Michael Born was named the Coach of the year in the IBA along with David Joerger of the Dakota Wizards. The Dragons were the IBA organization of the year in all four years of their existence.

== Playoffs ==
In 1998 the Dragons were swept 2–0 by the Fargo-Moorhead Beez in the IBA Semifinals. The Dragons swept Rochester 2–0 in the 1999 IBA Semifinals before losing to Mansfield 1–2 in the IBA Division Finals. In 2000 the Dragons had better luck in the playoffs, they started out by sweeping Billings 2–0 in the IBA Division Semifinals and Fargo-Moorhead 3–0 in the IBA Division Finals before going on to defeat the Magic City Snowbears 3–1 in the IBA Finals for the Dragons only championship. During the Dragons final season they swept Fargo-Moorhead 2–0 in the IBA Semifinals as well as sweeping Souixland 2–0 in the Division Finals. The Dragons took a 2-0 IBA Finals lead against the Dakota Wizards before losing three straight to lose the finals 3–2.

== Year-by-year record ==
Year	Games	W	L	Win %	Place	Playoffs	Results
1997–1998	34	22	12	.647	2nd, East	Lost Semifinals	Fargo-Moorhead 2, Des Moines 0
1998–1999	34	18	16	.529	2nd, East	Won Division Semifinals; Lost Divisional Finals	Des Moines 2, Rochester 0 Mansfield 2, Des Moines 1
1999–2000	36	25	11	.694	1st, East	Won Division Semifinals; Won Divisional Finals; Won IBA Finals	Des Moines 2, Billings 0 Des Moines 3, Fargo-Moorhead 0 Des Moines 3, Magic City 1
2000–2001	40	28	12	.700	1st, East	Won Division Semifinals; Won Divisional Finals; Lost IBA Finals	Des Moines 2, Fargo-Moorhead 0 Des Moines 2, Souixland 0 Dakota 3, Des Moines 2
Totals	144	93	51	.646	N/A	N/A	N/A
Playoffs	25	17	8	.680	N/A	1 Championship	Des Moines 5, Opponents 4

== Former Dragons players ==
- Tyrone Barksdale
- Michael Born
- Kris Bruton
- Ron Bayless
- Lonnie Cooper
- Ben Ebong
- Rosell Ellis
- Jon Hale
- Chad Faulkner
- Tye Fields
- Kirk Ford
- Edward Johnson
- Greg Jones
- Richmond McIver
- Roland Miller
- Michael Nurse
- Carl Pickett
- Kevin Sams
- Curt Smith
- Larry Thompson
- Johnny Tyson
- Troy Wade
- Jason Williams
- Justin Wimmer
- Jason Winningham
- Stan Gouard
- Cortez Barnes
