= Nick Kerr =

American basketball player and coach (born 1992)

Golden State Warriors
- Position: Assistant coach
- League: NBA

Personal information
- Born: November 9, 1992 (age 34) Cleveland, Ohio, U.S.
- Listed height: 6 ft 3 in (1.91 m)
- Listed weight: 180 lb (82 kg)

Career information
- High school: Torrey Pines (San Diego, California)
- College: San Diego (2011–2015); California (2015–2016)

Career history

Coaching
- 2021–2023: Santa Cruz Warriors (assistant)
- 2023–2025: Santa Cruz Warriors
- 2025–present: Golden State Warriors (assistant)

Nicholas Zwicker Kerr (born November 9, 1992) is an American basketball professional coach who is an assistant coach for the Golden State Warriors of the National Basketball Association (NBA). He was recently the head coach for the Santa Cruz Warriors of the NBA G League. He is also the son of current Golden State Warriors head coach Steve Kerr.

== Early life and college career ==
Kerr attended Torrey Pines High School in San Diego, California, graduating in 2011. Kerr played college basketball at University of San Diego and University of California.

In the 2011–12 season, Kerr played in 13 games for the Toreros as a true Freshman. After redshirting the 2012–2013 season, Kerr played in a career-high 21 games and made .476 percent from the three point line on 10-of-21 attempts. On February 15, 2014, Kerr scored a career high 12 points against Pacific in just eight minutes played. On February 14, 2015, Kerr made his only collegiate start against Saint Mary's. For the 2015–16 season, Kerr would walk-on at California. In seven games played for the Bears, Kerr scored nine points while shooting .500 from the field.

== Coaching career ==
Kerr served as graduate assistant coach for California in the 2016–2017 season. In 2018, Kerr was an intern for the San Antonio Spurs. Kerr spent the next three seasons with the Golden State Warriors where he assisted with player development and video coordination.

=== Santa Cruz Warriors (2023–2025) ===
In 2023, Kerr was named the head coach of the Santa Cruz Warriors after spending the previous two seasons as an assistant coach.

=== Golden State Warriors (2025–present) ===
After two seasons as head coach of the Santa Cruz Warriors, on June 19, 2025, Kerr rejoined the Golden State Warriors as an assistant coach under his father, head coach Steve Kerr.
