= Duane Ticknor =

American basketball coach

Career information
- College: South Dakota
- Position: Assistant coach

Career history

Coaching
- 1989–1992: Rapid City Thrillers (asst.)
- 1995–1998: Black Hills Posse
- 1998–1999: Rapid City Thrillers
- 1999–2000: Dakota Wizards, Yankton Timberwolves
- 2000–2001: Siouxland Bombers
- 2002–2005: Gary Steelheads
- 2005–2007: Marquette Catholic HS
- 2007–2009: Dakota Wizards
- 2009–2011: Sioux Falls Skyforce (asst.)
- 2012–2013: Fort Wayne Mad Ants
- 2013–2016: Memphis Grizzlies (assistant)
- 2016–2019: Sacramento Kings (assistant)

Career highlights
- 4× IBA Coach of the Year (1996, 1997, 1998, 2000)

Duane Ticknor He is a former assistant coach for the Memphis Grizzlies and a former NBA D-League head coach for the Fort Wayne Mad Ants and Sioux Falls Skyforce and Sacramento Kings.

== Biography ==
Ticknor is a native of Vermillion, South Dakota where he played basketball at Vermillion High School. He initially played basketball at Southern State College before transferring to the University of South Dakota where he played for the USD Coyotes. He graduated in 1978.

Ticknor became an assistant at Southern State and later, its head coach. After the college closed in 1984, Ticknor moved on to National College.

== Fort Wayne Mad Ants ==
The Mad Ants hired Ticknor in 2012. Ticknor guided the Mad Ants to a 27–23 record and helped the team make their first NBA D-League playoff appearance.

== Memphis Grizzlies ==
Ticknor joined the Grizzlies just before the 2013–14 NBA season. During his first year with the team, the Grizzlies made the 2014 NBA Playoffs, but they lost in the first round to the Oklahoma City Thunder in seven games.

== Sacramento Kings ==
On June 3, 2016, Ticknor joined the Sacramento Kings as an assistant coach.
