= Darius Rice =

American basketball player

Free agent
- Position: Power forward

Personal information
- Born: October 16, 1982 (age 44) Jackson, Mississippi
- Listed height: 6 ft 10 in (2.08 m)
- Listed weight: 222 lb (101 kg)

Career information
- High school: Lanier (Jackson, Mississippi)
- College: Miami (Florida) (2000–2004)
- NBA draft: 2004: undrafted
- Playing career: 2004–present

Career history
- 2004–2005: Florida Flame
- 2005–2006: Gary Steelheads
- 2006: Marinos de Anzoátegui
- 2006: Polpak Świecie
- 2006–2007: Jilin Northeast Tigers
- 2007: Dakota Wizards
- 2007–2008: Purefoods Tender Juicy Giants
- 2008: Gigantes de Carolina
- 2009: Atlético Atenas Montevideo
- 2009–2010: Szolnoki Olaj
- 2010: Capitanes de Arecibo
- 2010–2011: An Nahl Sharjah
- 2011: Atléticos de San Germán
- 2011–2012: Al Manama
- 2012–2013: Texas Legends
- 2013–2014: Hitachi SunRockers
- 2014: Maccabi Ashdod
- 2015: Karpoš Sokoli
- 2016: Al-Ahli
- 2016: Al-Fateh
- 2016: NS Matrix
- 2016: Austin Spurs
- 2017: Zacatecas
- 2018: Al-Karkh SC
- 2019: Plaza Fernando Valerio

Career highlights
- NBA Development League champion (2007); McDonald's All-American (2000); Third-team Parade All-American (2000)

Darius Lashaun Rice (born October 16, 1982) is an American professional basketball player. He played college basketball for the University of Miami. He is the nephew of former professional football player, Jerry Rice.

== College career ==
Rice played college basketball at the University of Miami.

=== College statistics ===
Year	Team	GP	GS	MPG	FG%	3P%	FT%	RPG	APG	SPG	BPG	PPG
2000-01	Miami	29	29	30.7	.398	.339	.720	4.9	1.0	1.0	0.5	14.1
2001-02	Miami	32	31	32.8	.383	.365	.800	5.9	1.7	1.2	0.7	14.9
2002-03	Miami	27	25	33.4	.426	.364	.763	5.8	1.2	1.4	0.8	18.8
2003-04	Miami	28	27	31.5	.407	.306	.802	6.4	0.9	0.8	0.7	16.9
Career		116	112	32.1	.403	.344	.776	5.7	1.2	1.1	0.6	16.0

== Professional career ==
Not being drafted by any NBA team and being unknown in Europe, Rice signed for the 2004–05 season with the NBA Development League club Florida Flame. During his career, Rice played in Venezuela, Poland, China, Philippines, Puerto Rico, Uruguay, Hungary, Bahrain, Japan, Israel and Macedonia.

During his time with Dakota, he became part of NBA D-League history. On April 29, 2007, the Wizards faced the Colorado 14ers for the championship at the Bismarck Civic Center in Bismarck, North Dakota. Coming off the bench, Rice scored 52 points, with one of his eleven three-point field goals coming with 4.5 seconds in regulation to force overtime. He set a record for most points in a D-League championship game and most three-point field goals, and the Wizards won 129–121 in overtime to win the championship.

On December 28, 2014, Rice signed with the Macedonian team KK Karpoš Sokoli.

On October 29, 2016, Rice was acquired by the Austin Spurs. However, he was waived on November 11.

== Career statistics ==
Legend
GP	Games played	GS	Games started	MPG	Minutes per game
FG%	Field goal percentage	3P%	3-point field goal percentage	FT%	Free throw percentage
RPG	Rebounds per game	APG	Assists per game	SPG	Steals per game
BPG	Blocks per game	PPG	Points per game	**Bold**	Career high

=== NBA D-League ===
==== Regular season ====
Year	Team	GP	GS	MPG	FG%	3P%	FT%	RPG	APG	SPG	BPG	PPG
2004–05	Florida	**42**	**38**	29.9	.402	.175	**.867**	4.2	**2.0**	0.7	0.4	10.5
2006–07	Dakota	18	0	25.5	**.445**	**.381**	.800	4.3	1.4	0.6	0.3	13.7
2012–13	Texas	25	25	**30.9**	.384	.350	.731	**6.9**	1.3	**1.1**	**0.6**	**15.6**
Career		85	63	29.2	.404	.340	.816	5.0	1.6	0.8	0.4	12.7
