= Fargo–Moorhead Beez =

Fargo-Moorhead Beez
- Conference: CBA National Conference (2001–2002)
- Division: IBA East Division (1997–2001)
- Leagues: International Basketball Association (1995-2001); Continental Basketball Association (2001-2002)
- Founded: 1995
- Folded: 2002
- History: Fargo-Moorhead Beez (1995–2002)
- Arena: Fargo Civic Center (1995–2001) Fargodome (2001–2002)
- Capacity: 2,800
- Location: Fargo, North Dakota
- Ownership: Al Gardner and Al Hovland
- Championships: 2 (1995–96) (1997–98)
- Division titles: 1 (1997–98)

The Fargo-Moorhead Beez was a professional basketball club based in Fargo, North Dakota that competed in the International Basketball Association (IBA) that began in the 1995-1996 season. They were the 1995-1996 and the 1997-1998 International Basketball Association champions.

The team joined the Continental Basketball Association in 2001 when the IBA folded, along with IBA rivals, the Dakota Wizards and the Saskatchewan Hawks. In their one and only CBA season, the Beez made the playoffs and faced off in a best-of-5 series with the Dakota Wizards for the National Conference Championship. The Wizards, however, won the series 3-0 and went on to become the 2002 CBA Champions. The Beez folded the following summer.

Notable former players include Chris "Birdman" Andersen, Tony Dunkin, and Ime Udoka (Houston Rockets head coach).

== Personnel ==
Head coaches

| # | Name | Term | GP | W | L | Pct. |
|---|---|---|---|---|---|---|
| 1 | Rory White | 1995–1998, 2001–2002 | 128 | 65 | 63 | .508 |
| 2 | Lance Berwald | 1998–1999 | 34 | 14 | 20 | .412 |
| 3 | David Shellhase | 1999–2000 | 36 | 21 | 15 | .583 |
| 4 | John Jordan | 2000–2001 | 17 | 7 | 10 | .412 |
| 5 | Lorenzo Charles | 2000–2001 | 23 | 8 | 15 | .348 |

== Season by season record ==
| Year | Gp | W | L | Pct. | Finish | Playoffs |
|---|---|---|---|---|---|---|
| 1995–96 | 24 | 10 | 14 | .417 | 3rd IBA | Won IBA Semi Finals 2–1 Vs Winnipeg Cyclone, Won IBA Championship 2–1 Vs Black Hills Posse |
| 1996–97 | 30 | 6 | 24 | .200 | 6th IBA | Did Not Qualify |
| 1997–98 | 34 | 24 | 10 | .706 | 1st IBA East | Won IBA East Division Semi Finals 2–0 Vs Des Moines Dragons, Won IBA Championship 2–1 Vs Black Hills Posse |
| 1998–99 | 34 | 14 | 20 | .412 | 5th IBA East | Did Not Qualify |
| 1999–00 | 36 | 21 | 15 | .583 | 2nd IBA East | Won IBA East Division Semifinals 2–0 Vs Saskatchewan Hawks, Lost IBA East Division Finals 3–0 Vs Des Moines Dragons |
| 2000–01 | 40 | 15 | 25 | .375 | 4th IBA East | Lost IBA East Division Semi Finals 2–0 Vs Des Moines Dragons |
| 2001–02 | 40 | 25 | 15 | .625 | 2nd CBA National Conference | |
