= St. Paul Slam! =

St. Paul Slam!!!
- League: International Basketball Association
- Founded: 1996
- History: St. Cloud Rock'n Rollers (1990–1995); St. Paul Slam! (1996-1998)
- Arena: Roy Wilkins Auditorium
- Capacity: 5,000
- Location: Saint Paul, Minnesota
- Head coach: Mike McCollow
- Championships: 0
- Conference titles: 0
- Division titles: 0

The St. Paul Slam! was a professional basketball club based in Saint Paul, Minnesota, United States, that competed in the International Basketball Association beginning in the 1996-97 season. After just two seasons the team folded.

== Personnel ==
Head Coaches

#	Name	Term	Regular season				Playoffs				Achievements	Reference
#	Name	Term	GC	W	L	Win%	GC	W	L	Win%	Achievements	Reference
1	Mike McCollow	1996–1998	64	21	43	.328	2	0	2	.000		

== Season results ==
Season	GP	W	L	Pct.	Finish	Playoff Wins	Playoff Losses	Playoff Pct.	Playoff Results
1996-97	30	13	17	.433	4th	0	2	.000	Lost Semi Finals 2-0 Vs Black Hills Posse
1997-98	34	8	26	.235	4th	0	0	.000	Did not qualify
All-time	64	21	43	.328	--	0	2	.000	--
