= Black Hills Posse =

- Division: IBA West Division (1997–1999)
- League: IBA 1995-1999
- Founded: 1995
- Folded: 1999
- History: Black Hills Posse; 1995-1998; Rapid City Thrillers; 1998-1999
- Arena: Rushmore Plaza Civic Center
- Location: Rapid City, South Dakota
- Team colors: Teal, black, white
- Head coach: Duane Ticknor
- Championships: 1 (1997)
Home	Away

The Black Hills Posse was a professional basketball team based in Rapid City, South Dakota that competed in the International Basketball Association beginning in the 1995–96 season. The team was founded by George Daniel, an attorney from Pennsylvania. The Posse were created for Rapid City as a response to the departure of the Rapid City Thrillers of the Continental Basketball Association. They were the 1996–97 International Basketball Association champions with an all-time winning record of 85 and 37.

In 1998, the Black Hills Posse were sold to John Tuschman (former owner of the original Rapid City Thrillers of the Continental Basketball Association). Tuschman tried to spark the old spirit the Thrillers had from the late 1980s and early 1990s, by renaming the Posse to the Thrillers and bringing back the original "flaming basketball" logo. He was unsuccessful, and the new Thrillers folded after the end of the 1998-99 season. The IBA continued for one more season in Rapid City, as the Black Hills Gold played in the 1999-00 season for one year. Rapid City has been without professional basketball ever since.

== Season-by-season record ==
Year	League	GP	W	L	Pct.	Reg. season	Playoffs
1995–96	IBA	24	20	4	.833	1st	Won’t IBA Semi Finals 2–0 Vs St. Cloud Rock'n Rollers, Lost IBA Finals 2–1 Vs Fargo-Moorhead Beez
1996–97	IBA	30	26	4	.867	1st	Won IBA Semi Finals 2–0 Vs St. Paul Slam!, Won IBA Championship 2–0 Vs Dakota Wizards
1997–98	IBA	34	23	11	.676	1st, West	Finals
1998–99	IBA	34	16	18	.471	3rd, West	Division Semifinals
Totals	IBA	122	85	37	.697	–	

== Some notable players ==
- Isaac Burton
- Dennis Edwards (basketball)
- Damon Jones
- G.J. Hunter
- Lonnie Cooper
- Nico Harrison
