= Magic City Snowbears =

- Division: IBA West Division (1997–2001)
- League: International Basketball Association
- Established: 1996
- Folded: 2002
- Arena: Minot Municipal Auditorium (1996–2000); Maysa Arena (2000–2001)
- Location: Minot, North Dakota
- Ownership: Curt Zimbelman, Tom Anderson
- Championships: 0

The Magic City Snowbears was a professional basketball club based in Minot, North Dakota that competed in the International Basketball Association beginning in the 1996-1997 season. The team played their games at Minot Municipal Auditorium from 1996–2000 and Maysa Arena from 2000–2001. The team was disbanded when the IBA, IBL, and CBA merged for the 2001-2002 season. The team was managed by future Minot, ND Mayor Curt Zimbelman.

== Personnel ==
#	Name	Term	Regular season				Playoffs				Achievements	Reference
#	Name	Term	GC	W	L	Win%	GC	W	L	Win%	Achievements	Reference
1	Rick Ross	1996–1997	30	15	15	.500	3	1	2	.333		
2	Jay Goedert	1997–1998	34	11	23	.324	–	–	–	–		
3	Frank Evans	1998										
4	Rob Spon	1998–2000										
5	Larry Lessett	2000–2001	40	20	20	.500	2	0	2	.000		

== Season by season record ==
Season	Gp	W	L	Pct.	Finish	Playoffs
1996–97	30	15	15	.500	3rd IBA	Lost in Semi Finals 2–1 Vs Dakota Wizards
1997–98	34	11	23	.324	4th IBA West	Did not Qualify
1998–99	34	17	17	.500	2nd IBA West	Won West Division Semi Finals 2–1 Vs Rapid City Thrillers, Won West Division Finals 2–1 Vs Winnipeg Cyclone, Lost IBA Championship 3–0 Vs Mansfield Hawks
1999–00	36	19	17	.528	3rd IBA West	Won IBA West Division Semi Finals 2–0 Vs Black Hills Gold, Won IBA West Division Finals 3–1 Vs Dakota Wizards, Lost IBA Finals 3–1 Vs Des Moines Dragons
2000–01	40	20	20	.500	4th IBA West	Lost IBA West Division Semi Final 2–0 Vs Dakota Wizards
Totals	174	82	92	.471		
