= Saskatchewan Hawks =

Canadian basketball team

- Leagues: International Basketball Association (2000–01); Continental Basketball Association (2001–02)
- Founded: 1998
- Folded: 2002
- History: Mansfield Hawks (1998–1999); Youngstown Hawks (1999–2000); Saskatchewan Hawks (2000–2002)
- Arena: Saskatchewan Place
- Location: Saskatoon, Saskatchewan
- Ownership: Tom Tao (2000–2001) Continental Basketball Association (2001–2002)
- Championships: 0

The Saskatchewan Hawks were a professional basketball club based in Saskatoon, Saskatchewan that competed in the International Basketball Association beginning in the 2000–01 season, and the Continental Basketball Association in 2001–02.

== Team history ==
=== From Youngstown to Saskatoon ===
The team moved to Saskatoon from Youngstown, Ohio, where the Hawks had played just one season, in the year 2000. In Youngstown, the team was owned by former NBA owner Ted Stepien, but failed to gain traction, leading Stepien to move the team. Tom Tao was the principal investor, purchasing 70 per cent of the team and bringing Saskatchewan its first professional team since the Saskatoon Slam folded in 1994. During their lone IBA season in 2000–01, Saskatchewan finished third in their division and defeated the Billings RimRockers in the first round of playoffs, before losing to the eventual IBA-champion Dakota Wizards in the second round. That season, the team was coached by Rob Spon. The IBA folded at the conclusion of the season.

=== From IBA to CBA ===
The team joined the Continental Basketball Association in 2001 after the IBA folded, along with the rival Wizards and Fargo-Moorhead Beez. The Hawks gave away more than 6,000 tickets for their season-opener. In their first and only season in the CBA, the Hawks compiled the worst record in the league with just 8 wins in 40 matches. Their coach that year was Laurian Watkins. Tao disappeared from the team during the season and the league took over the team's operations, along with a local First Nations investment group. However, talks between the groups ultimately collapsed, and the team folded after the 2002 season. Their final game was a 112–100 loss at home to the Beez on 22 March 2002.

The Hawks collapse left the province without professional-level basketball until the founding of the Saskatchewan Rattlers, a charter member of the Canadian Elite Basketball League, in 2019.

== Seasons ==
Season	League	GP	W	L	Pct.	GB	Finish	Postseason
1999–00	IBA	36	9	27	.250	16	3rd IBA East	Lost East Semi Final 2–0 Vs Fargo-Moorhead Beez
2000–01	IBA	36	21	19	.583	9	3rd IBA West	Won West Semi Final 2–1 over Billings RimRockers, Lost the West Final 2–0 to Dakota Wizards
2001–02	CBA	40	8	32	.200	25	8th CBA	Did not qualify
Totals (2000–2002)		112	38	78	.339	–	–	
