= Mansfield Hawks =

American basketball team, 1998–2000

- League: International Basketball Association
- Founded: 1998
- Folded: 2002
- History: Mansfield Hawks (1998–99); Youngstown Hawks (1999–00); Saskatchewan Hawks (2000–02)
- Arena: Malabar Middle School
- Location: Mansfield, Ohio
- Head coach: Kevin Mackey
- Ownership: Ted Stepien
- Championships: 1 (1999)
- Division titles: 1 (1999)

The Mansfield Hawks were an International Basketball Association (IBA) professional basketball team located in Mansfield, Ohio for one season, in 1998-99. The Hawks won the IBA championship in their lone season. They were guided by local, but infamous, coach Kevin Mackey. One of the Hawks' notable players was 7 ft 2 in, 315 pound center Garth Joseph, a dominating presence with a physical appearance resembling Shaquille O'Neal. The team played its home games in the gymnasium of Malabar Middle School.

Before the 1999–00 season, the team was relocated to Youngstown and became the Youngstown Hawks. In 2003, Mansfield was again targeted as the home for another possible professional basketball team.

== All-time roster ==
This list is incomplete

- Tommy Adams
- Dubrey Black - Bowling Green State University, Ashland University
- Samuel Haley - University of Missouri
- Donnell Harrison
- Matt Hill - University of Wisconsin
- Kris Hunter - University of Virginia, Jacksonville University
- Garth Joseph - St. Rose
- Darren Little
- Charles Macon - Ohio State University, Central Michigan
- Curtis McCants
- Matt McClelland - Saint Francis University
- Gaylon Nickerson - Northwestern Oklahoma State
- Roheen Oats
- Reggie Okasa - LaSalle University
- Dapreis Owens - University of Nebraska-Lincoln
- Malcolm Sims - Cleveland State University
- Corey Tarrant
- Anthony Taylor - Miami (OH) University
- Bevin Thomas
- Vincent Thomas - University of Wisconsin Superior
- Art Crowder - Howard University
- Seth Marshall (basketball)-Fresno State University
- Mike Lloyd- Syracuse University
- LaMarr Greer - Florida State University
- Shane Drisdom
- John Tripoulas - Oberlin College
- John Wassenberger
- Artemus McClary
