= St. Cloud Rock'n Rollers =

- League: International Basketball Association
- Founded: 1995
- Folded: 1996
- Arena: Halenbeck Hall
- Capacity: 7,500
- Location: St. Cloud, Minnesota
- Head coach: Jay Garmetz

The St. Cloud Rock'n Rollers was a professional basketball club based in St. Cloud, Minnesota that competed in the International Basketball Association beginning in the 1995–96 season. Their home court was Halenbeck Hall on the campus of St. Cloud State University. The team folded after just one season.

== Personnel ==
- Head Coach: Jay Garmetz
- Director of Marketing: Gerald VanDiver
- PA Announcer: Rollie Lange

== Season results ==
Season	GP	W	L	Pct.	Finish	Playoff Wins	Playoff Losses	Playoff Results
1995-96	24	8	16	.333	4th	0	2	Lost 2-0 to Black Hills Posse in semifinals
All-time	24	8	16	.333	--	0	2	--
