= International Basketball Association =

Defunct basketball league in the U.S.

- Sport: Basketball
- Founded: 1995
- Founder: Tom Anderson, et al.
- Folded: 2001
- No. of teams: 18
- Countries: United States; Canada
- Last champion: Dakota Wizards (2001)
- Most titles: Fargo–Moorhead Beez (2 Championships)

The International Basketball Association (IBA) was founded in 1995 by a group of businessmen led by Tom Anderson. The original owners of franchises in the league were George Daniel (Black Hills Posse-Rapid City, SD), John Korsmo, Al Gardner, and Al Hovland (Fargo Beez), Jeff McCarron (St. Cloud Rock 'n Rollers), Bill Sorensen (Dakota Wizards - Bismarck) and Earl Barish (Winnipeg Cyclones). Earl Barish of Winnipeg directed the IBA as League President and the league eventually grew to ten franchises. On September 1, 2001, CBA and IBL teams merged with the IBA and purchased the assets of the defunct CBA, including its name, logo and records from the bankruptcy court and restarted operations, calling itself the CBA. This group continued to operate until June 2009, when it was forced to cease operations.

== League personnel ==
League Commissioners

- Gerald Wilcox 1995

League Presidents

- Earl Barish 1995–1999

== Teams ==
Locations of teams in the International Basketball Association from 1995 to 2001

Team	City	Years
Billings RimRockers	Billings, Montana	1998–2001
Black Hills Gold	Rapid City, South Dakota	1999–2000
Black Hills Posse	Rapid City, South Dakota	1995–1998
Dakota Wizards	Bismarck, North Dakota	1995–2001
Des Moines Dragons	Des Moines, Iowa	1997–2001
Fargo-Moorhead Beez	Fargo, North Dakota	1995–2001
Mansfield Hawks	Mansfield, Ohio	1998–1999
Magic City Snowbears	Minot, North Dakota	1996–2001
Rapid City Thrillers	Rapid City, South Dakota	1998–1999
Rochester Skeeters	Rochester, Minnesota	1998–2000
St. Cloud Rock'n Rollers	St. Cloud, Minnesota	1995–1996
St. Paul Slam!	St. Paul, Minnesota	1996–1998
Salina Rattlers	Salina, Kansas	2000–2001
Saskatchewan Hawks	Saskatoon, Saskatchewan	2000–2001
Siouxland Bombers	Sioux City, Iowa	1999–2001
South Dakota Gold	Mitchell, South Dakota	2000–2001
Winnipeg Cyclone	Winnipeg, Manitoba	1995–2001
Wisconsin Blast	Appleton, Wisconsin	1997–1999
Youngstown Hawks	Youngstown, Ohio	1999–2000

== League championships ==
Year	Champion	Most Valuable Player
1995–96	Fargo-Moorhead Beez	Isaac Burton, Black Hills Posse
1996–97	Black Hills Posse	Dennis Edwards, Black Hills Posse
1997–98	Fargo-Moorhead Beez	Andrell Hoard, Winnipeg Cyclone & Mike Lloyd, Mansfield Hawks
1998–99	Mansfield Hawks	Andrell Hoard, Winnipeg Cyclone & Mike Lloyd, Mansfield Hawks
1999–00	Des Moines Dragons	Brian Green, Dakota Wizards
2000–01	Dakota Wizards	Lonnie Cooper, Des Moines Dragons

The IBA merged with the International Basketball League and the Continental Basketball Association (CBA) to "restart" the CBA for the 2001–2002 season.

== Awards ==
=== Most Valuable Player ===
Season	Player	Team
1995–96	Isaac Burton	Black Hills Posse
1996–97	Dennis Edwards	Black Hills Posse
1997–98	Andrell Hoard and Mike Lloyd	Winnipeg Cyclone and Mansfield Hawks
1998–99	Andrell Hoard and Mike Lloyd	Winnipeg Cyclone and Mansfield Hawks
1999–00	Brian Green	Dakota Wizards
2000–01	Lonnie Cooper	Des Moines Dragons

=== Rookie of the Year ===
Season	Player	Team
1997–98	Kenya Capers	St. Paul Slam
1998–99	Roderick Blakney	Dakota Wizards
1999–00	Antonio Reynolds-Dean	Dakota Wizards
2000–01	Marcus Hicks	Siouxland Bombers

=== Defensive Player of the Year ===
Season	Player	Team
1997–98	Ron Bayless	Des Moines Dragons
1998–99	Roderick Blakney	Dakota Wizards
1999–00	Johnny McCrimmon	Fargo Moorhead Beez
2000–01	Willie Murdaugh	Dakota Wizards

=== Sixth Man of the Year ===
Season	Player	Team
1997–98	Damon Jones	Black Hills Posse
1998–99	Rob Feaster	Rochester Skeeters
1999–00	Kevin Beard	Dakota Wizards
2000–01	Rasheed Brokenborough	South Dakota Gold

=== Coach of the Year ===
Season	Coach	Team
1995–96	Duane Ticknor	Black Hills Posse
1996–97	Duane Ticknor	Black Hills Posse
1997–98	Duane Ticknor	Black Hills Posse
1998–99	Darryl Dawkins	Winnipeg Cyclone
1998–99	Kevin Mackey	Mansfield Hawks
1999–00	Duane Ticknor	Dakota Wizards
2000–01	Dave Joerger	Dakota Wizards
2000–01	Mike Born	Des Moines Dragons

=== Organization of the Year ===
Year	Team
1997–98	Des Moines Dragons
1998–99	Des Moines Dragons
1999–00	Des Moines Dragons
2000–01	Dakota Wizards

== Statistical leaders ==
Year	Points	Rebounds	Assists	Steals	Blocks
1995–96	Isaac Burton, 24.0	Erik Coleman, 10.0	Townsend Orr, 7.8	Isaac Burton, 2.5	Shane Drisdom, 3.2
1996–97	Dennis Edwards, 33.6	Mark Hutton, 10.8	Calvin Rayford, 8.9	Calvin Rayford, 2.9	Shane Drisdom, 3.0
1997–98	Artie Griffin, 26.8	Brian Shorter, 10.5	Darren Sanderlin, 8.3	Willie Murdaugh, 3.1	Chad Allen, 2.4
1998–99	Andrell Hoard, 28.6	DeRon Rutledge, 13.6	Curt Smith, 8.5	Roderick Blakney, 2.8	Garth Joseph, 2.5
1999–00	Rasaun Young, 27.6	Antonio Reynolds-Dean, 12.2	Malik Dixon, 7.9	T. J. Walker, 3.1	Johnny McCrimmon, 2.6
2000–01	Mac Irvin, 21.8	Jason Williams, 12.0	Tim Winn, 7.3	John Thomas, 2.8	John Ford, 2.2

== Notable players ==
These players played at least 1 game in the NBA.

- Chris Andersen
- Nate Driggers
- Damon Jones
- Garth Joseph
- Martin Lewis
- Anthony Taylor
- Ime Udoka

== See also ==
- Continental Basketball Association
- International Basketball League (1999–2001)
- United States Basketball League
