= Billings RimRockers =

- League: International Basketball Association
- Founded: 1998
- Folded: 2001
- Arena: MetraPark Arena
- Capacity: 10,500
- Location: Billings, Montana
- Ownership: Ron Omo

The Billings RimRockers was a professional basketball team based in Billings, Montana that competed in the International Basketball Association (IBA) beginning in the 1998–99 season. The team folded along with the IBA after the 2000–01 season.
