= Clain (name) =

Clain may refer to: Clain is a surname. Notable people with the name include:

== People with the surname ==
- Elvira Clain-Stefanelli (1914–2001), American numismatist and advisor to the US Mint
- Fabien Clain (1978–2019), French purported veteran jihadist terrorist
- Médéric Clain (born 1976), French cyclist
- Pablo Clain (1652–1717), Jesuit missionary and scientist in the Philippines

== See also ==
- Similar surnames: Clein, Cline, Clyne, Klein, Kleine, Kline, Klyne
