= Klein (surname) =

Klein (Czech and Slovak feminine: Kleinová) is a surname. It is the German, Dutch, Afrikaans, and Yiddish word for 'small', which came to be used as a surname, and thence passed into the names of places, concepts and discoveries associated with bearers of this surname. Notable people with the surname include:

== Academics and technology ==
- Aaron E. Klein (1930–1998), American historian of science
- Dan Klein, American computer scientist
- Daniel Klein (grammarian) (1609–1666), German-Lithuanian pastor and grammarian
- Daniel B. Klein (born 1962), American economist
- Etienne Klein (born 1958), French physicist and philosopher of science
- Fritz Klein (sex researcher) (1932–2006), American sex researcher
- Gary A. Klein (born 1944), American research psychologist
- George Klein (inventor) (1904–1992), Canadian inventor
- Heinz Klein (1940–2008), American sociologist
- Josephine Klein (1926–2018), German-born British psychologist
- Jacob Theodor Klein (1685–1759), Prussian botanist
- Lawrence Klein (1920–2013), American economist
- Leo S. Klein, or Leo Klejn (1927–2019), Russian Jewish archaeologist, anthropologist and philologist
- Martin J. Klein (1924–2009), American science historian of physics
- Marty Klein (born 1950), American sex therapist
- Melanie Klein (1882–1960), British psychotherapist
- Michael L. Klein (born 1940), British-American computational chemist
- Oskar Klein (1894–1977), Swedish physicist
- Richard Klein (paleoanthropologist) (born 1941), American paleoanthropologist
- Sabra Klein, American microbiologist
- Samuel Klein (scholar) (1886–1940), Hungarian-born rabbi, historian and historical geographer
- Wilhelm Klein (1850–1924), Hungarian-Austrian archeologist
- Wolfgang Klein (linguist) (born 1946), German linguist

== Arts and entertainment ==
=== Film and television ===
- Chris Klein (actor) (born 1979), American actor
- Dušan Klein (1939–2022), Czech film director and screenwriter
- Jesper Klein (1944–2011), Danish actor
- Joey Klein, Canadian actor and film director
- Marci Klein (born 1967), American television producer
- Martina Klein (born 1976), Argentine model and TV presenter
- Robert Klein (born 1942), American stand-up comedian and actor

=== Literature ===
- A. M. Klein (1909–1972), Canadian poet
- Aaron J. Klein (1960–2016), Israeli author and journalist
- Augusta Klein (1866–1943), English author
- Charles Klein (playwright) (1867–1915) London-born American playwright
- Chuck Klein (author) (born 1947) American author
- Daniel Martin Klein (born 1939), American author
- Ernest Klein (1899–1983), Canadian linguist, author and rabbi
- Gérard Klein (born 1937), French science fiction writer
- Hannelore Klein (born 1927), German-born American linguist and writer known as Laureen Nussbaum
- Joe Klein (born 1946), American journalist and novelist
- Josef K. Klein (1896–1971), Bulgarian poet of Austrian origin known by the pseudonym Gustav Heinse
- Julius Leopold Klein (1810–1876), Hungarian dramatist
- Michael Klein (writer) (born 1954), American fiction writer, poet and academic
- Naomi Klein (born 1970), Canadian author and activist
- Nathan Klein (1923–2004), known as Natan Yonatan, Ukrainian-born Israeli poet
- Robin Klein (born 1936), Australian author of children's books
- T. E. D. Klein (born 1947), American horror writer and editor

=== Music ===
- Klein (musician), recording artist, producer and singer from South London
- Alan Klein (born 1940), English singer and songwriter (New Vaudeville Band)
- Allen Klein (1931–2009), manager for the Beatles and Rolling Stones
- Carol Joan Klein (born 1942), stage name Carole King, American composer and singer-songwriter
- Barbara Lynn Klein (born 1950), known as Barbi Benton, American Playboy model, singer and actress
- Dani Klein (born 1953), stage name of Danielle Schoovaerts (born 1953), Belgian singer and songwriter
- Elisabeth Klein (1911–2004), Hungarian-Danish pianist
- Eliška Kleinová (1912–1999), Czech pianist
- Gary Klein (producer) (born 1942), songwriter, record producer, and co-writer of "(I Wanna Be) Bobby's Girl"
- Gene Klein (born 1949), better known as Gene Simmons, American musician
- Gideon Klein (1919–1945), pianist and composer
- Howie Klein (1948–2025), American record label executive, and activist
- Jim Klein, American composer and songwriter
- Jon Klein (musician) (born 1960), guitarist and producer
- Joost Klein (born 1997), Dutch hip hop artist
- Mannie Klein (1908–1994), American jazz trumpeter
- Marlon Klein (born 1957), German musician and producer
- Mark Klein (singer) (born 1993), American singer-songwriter
- Oscar Klein (1930–2006), Austrian-born jazz trumpeter
- Suzy Klein (born 1975), British music and arts broadcaster

=== Painting ===
- Anna Klein (painter) (1883–1941), German painter
- Fred Klein (1898–1990), Dutch painter, father of Yves
- Mary-Austin Klein (born 1964), American landscape painter
- Yves Klein (1928–1962), French painter, son of Fred

=== Other arts and entertainment ===
- Aart Klein (1909–2001), Dutch photographer
- Ethan Klein (born 1985), American-Israeli YouTuber
- Franz Klein (sculptor) (1779–1840), Viennese sculptor, creator of a famous bust of Beethoven
- Todd Klein (born 1951), comic book letterer
- William Klein (photographer) (1926–2022), American-born French photographer and filmmaker

== Business and industry ==
- Anne Klein (fashion designer) (1923–1974), American fashion designer and entrepreneur
- Bill Klein (businessman) (born c. 1948), American businessman and poker player
- Calvin Klein (fashion designer) (born 1942), American fashion designer
- David Klein (1946), businessman
- David Klein (1935–2021), governor, Bank of Israel
- Fernando Heydrich Klein (1827–1903) German businessman, politician, engineer and sculptor
- Jon Klein (CNN), president of the American television news network CNN
- Jonathan Klein (Getty Images) (born 1960), founder of Getty Images
- Leonardo Farkas Klein (born 1967), Chilean businessman
- Mathias Klein, founder of Klein Tools
- Michel Klein (designer) (born 1958), French fashion designer
- Michael Klein (businessman) (born 1951), Brazilian business executive
- Robin Klein (venture capitalist) (born 1947), British entrepreneur and investor
- Samuel Klein (businessman) (1923–2014), Polish-Brazilian business magnate

== Mathematics and science ==
- Abel Klein (born 1945), American mathematician
- Esther Klein (1910–2005), Hungarian–Australian mathematician
- Marthe Weiss née Klein (1885–1953), French scientist and teacher, worked with Marie Curie
- Felix Klein (1849–1925), German mathematician
- Willem Klein (1912–1986), Dutch mathematician and mental calculator

== Medicine ==
- Christine Klein, German physician and professor of neurology and neurogenetics
- Emanuel Edward Klein (1844–1925), British bacteriologist
- Eva Klein (1925–2025), Hungarian-Swedish cancer researcher
- Fritz Klein (1888–1945), German Nazi doctor hanged for war crimes
- Jan Klein (born 1936), Czech-American immunologist
- Luella Klein (1924–2019), American obstetrician-gynecologist and professor

== Politics and government ==
- Aaron Klein (born 1979), senior adviser, chief strategist for Prime Minister Benjamin Netanyahu
- Arthur George Klein (1904–1968), United States Representative from New York
- Clayton Klein (born 1949), American politician
- Deborah Klein Lopez, American politician
- Elijah Klein (born 2000), American football player
- Ezra Klein (born 1984), American political writer
- Hans Klein (politician) (1931–1996), German politician
- Hans Hugo Klein (born 1936), German politician
- Hendrikje Klein (born 1979), German politician
- Herb Klein (journalist) (1918–2009), American journalist, President Nixon's communications director
- Herb Klein (politician) (1930–2023), American politician
- Herbert G. Klein (1918–2009), American political aide
- Ivo Klein (born 1961), Liechtenstein politician
- Jacob Theodor Klein (1685–1759), Prussian jurist, historian, botanist, mathematician and diplomat
- Jacques Paul Klein (born 1939), French-born American diplomat
- Joe Klein (born 1946), American political commentator and writer for Time magazine
- Jürgen Klein (born 1973), German politician
- Karsten Klein (born 1977), German politician
- Louis Klein (1759–1845), French politician and peer, general during the French Revolutionary and Napoleonic Wars
- Louis Christian Klein (1832–1900), German-American politician
- Marcus Klein (born 1976), German politician
- Norbert Klein (politician) (1956–2021), Dutch politician
- Ottilie Klein (born 1984), German politician
- Ralph Klein (1942–2013), Canadian politician
- Réka Klein (born 1989), German politician
- Ron Klein (born 1957), American politician
- Volkmar Klein (born 1960), German politician

== Religion ==
- Ernest Klein (1899–1983), Canadian linguist and rabbi
- Félix Klein (1862–1953), French priest and theologian
- Isaac Klein (1905–1979), American rabbi
- Menashe Klein (1924–2011), American rabbi
- Norbert Klein (1866–1933), Grand Master of the Teutonic Knights

== Sports ==
- Abraham Klein (referee) (born 1934), Israeli football referee
- Ágnes Keleti (1921–2025), born Klein, Hungarian-Israeli Olympic champion artistic gymnast
- Brydan Klein (born 1989), Australian-born British tennis player
- Chris Klein (soccer) (born 1976), American soccer player
- Chuck Klein (1904–1958), American baseball player
- Collin Klein (born 1989), American football player
- Dede Klein (1910–1966), Canadian ice hockey player
- Dieter Klein (born 1988), South African cricketer
- Elijah Klein (born 2000), American football player
- Ernest Klein (chess player) (1910–1990), Austrian-British chess master and author
- Erwin Klein (died 1992), American table tennis player
- Frederick C Klein (born 1938), American sportswriter
- Gertrude Kleinová (1918–1976), Czech table tennis player
- Hanna Klein, German athlete
- Herbert Klein (swimmer) (1923–2001), German swimmer
- Jackie Klein (born 1937), American artistic gymnast
- Joe Klein (baseball executive) (1942–2017), American baseball executive
- Kevin Klein (ice hockey) (born 1984), Canadian ice hockey player
- Kristin Klein (born 1970), American volleyball player (1959–1993)
- Ľudovít Klein (born 1995), Slovak mixed martial artist
- Marlin Klein (born 2002), German-American football player
- Martin Klein (footballer), Czech footballer
- Martin Klein (wrestler) (1884–1947), Estonian wrestler
- Marvin Klein (born 1999), French racing driver
- Michael Klein (footballer, born 1959) (1959–1993), Romanian international footballer
- Noeki Klein (born 1983), Dutch water polo player
- Perry Klein (born 1971), American football player
- Ralph Klein (basketball) (1931–2008), Israeli basketball player and coach
- Raul Klein (1932–1998), Brazilian footballer
- Roelof Klein (1877–1960), Dutch rower
- Sandra Kleinová (born 1978), Czech tennis player
- Siegmund Klein (1902–1987), American bodybuilder
- Will Klein (baseball) (born 1999), American baseball player
- Wolfgang Klein (1941–2017), German athlete

== Other ==
- Bradley S. Klein (born 1954), American golf author, architecture editor for Golf Week magazine
- Carol Klein (born 1945), British gardening broadcaster and writer
- Gerda Weissmann Klein (1924–2022), Holocaust survivor
- Hans Klein (1891–1944), German Luftwaffe major-general
- Iris Klein, German model and beauty queen crowned Miss International 1989
- Johannes Klein (died 1926), German First World War flying ace
- Mark Klein (fl. 2006), American whistleblower and former AT&T technician
- Roman Klein (1858–1924), Russian architect
- Vilhelm Klein (1835–1913), Danish architect

== See also ==
- Klein (disambiguation)
- Clein, Cline, Clyne, Kline
