= Klyne =

Klyne is a surname (and, more rarely, a given name). Notable people with the name include:

== Surname ==
- George Klyne (1828–1875), Canadian politician; Member of the Legislative Assembly of Manitoba
- Marty Klyne (born 1957), Canadian senator and former corporate executive
- Michel Klyne (1781–1868), Canadian employee of North West Company and Hudson's Bay Company
- William Klyne (1913–1977), British organic chemist

== Given name ==
- Klyne Snodgrass (born 1944), American theologian and author

== See also ==
- Similar surnames: Clain, Clein, Cline, Clyne, Klein, Kleine, Kline
