= Cline (surname) =

Cline is a surname. It is an anglicisation of the German name Klein or Gaelic Clyne. Notable people with the surname include:

- Alan Cline, American computer scientist
- Aleisha Cline (born 1970), Canadian skier
- Alex Cline (born 1956), American drummer
- Alfred Leonard Cline (1888–1948), American serial killer
- Alice C. Parker, née Cline, American electrical engineer
- Amy F. Cline (born 1974), American judge
- Ben Cline (born 1972), American politician
- Bill Cline (born 1943), American football player
- Bob Cline (1933–2020), American politician
- Bruce Cline (1931–2025), Canadian ice hockey player
- Cass A. Cline (1850–1926), American pioneer
- Catherine Ann Cline (1927–2005), American historian and author
- Charles Cline (disambiguation), multiple people
- Chris Cline (1958–2019), American businessman
- Curly Ray Cline (1923–1997), American fiddler
- Cyrus Cline (1856–1923), American politician
- David Cline (activist) (1947–2007), American veterans activist
- David B. Cline (1933–2015), American physicist
- Donald Cline, American fertility specialist, biological father of at least 96 people
- Edward Cline (born 1946), American screenwriter and director
- Edward F. Cline (1891–1961), American screenwriter
- Emma Cline, American writer
- Emmanuael Cline, the namesake of the Cline Town in Freetown, Sierra Leone
- Eric Cline (politician) (born 1955), Canadian politician
- Eric H. Cline (born 1960), American archaeologist
- Ernest Cline (born 1972), American comedian and screenwriter
- Ezra Cline (1907–1984), American bassist
- Genevieve R. Cline (1877–1959), American judge
- Gloria Griffen Cline (1923–1973), American historian
- Henry Cline (1750–1827), English surgeon
- Hernán Cline (born 1973), Uruguayan cyclist
- Hollis Cline, American neuroscientist
- Howard F. Cline (1915–1971), American historian
- Isaac Cline (1861–1955), American meteorologist
- Jackie Cline (born 1960), American football player
- James J. Cline (1899–1969), American football coach
- Judy Wills Cline (born 1948), American trampoline gymnast
- Kameron Cline (born 1998), American football player
- Keita Cline (born 1974), Virgin Island athlete
- Leonard Cline (1893–1929), American novelist
- Leticia Cline (born 1978), American model
- Madelyn Cline (born 1997), American actress
- Maggie Cline (1857–1923), Irish-American singer
- Mark Cline (born 1961), American artist
- Martin Cline (born 1934), American geneticist
- Melanie Cline (born 1975), American motocross racer
- Melissa S. Cline, American biologist
- Milton W. Cline (1825–1911), American sailor
- Monk Cline (1858–1916), American baseball player
- Nels Cline (born 1956), American guitarist and composer
- Ollie Cline (1925–2001), American football player
- Patsy Cline (1932–1963), American country music singer
- Ray S. Cline (1918–1996), American intelligence officer
- Russ Cline, American lacrosse executive
- Russell Cline (born 1965), American currency trader
- Sperry Cline (1881–1964), Canadian policeman
- Sue Cline (1946–2021), American politician
- Terry Cline (born 1958), American psychologist
- T. J. Cline (born 1994), American-Israeli basketball player
- Tony Cline (1948–2018), American football player
- Tony Cline Jr. (born 1971), American football player
- Troy Cline (born 1969), American stock car racing driver
- Ty Cline (born 1939), American baseball player
- Victor Cline (1925–2013), American psychoanalyst
- William R. Cline (born 1941), American economist
