= 2008 NBA All-Star Game =

Exhibition basketball game

	1	2	3	4	Total
East	34	40	32	28	134
West	28	37	28	35	128
- Date: February 17, 2008
- Arena: New Orleans Arena
- City: New Orleans
- MVP: LeBron James
- National anthem: Deborah Cox (CAN); Branford Marsalis, Stephanie Jordan, and Jonathan Dubose (USA)
- Halftime show: Harry Connick Jr., Branford Marsalis, Dr. John, Allen Toussaint, Davell Crawford, Art Neville, Ivan Neville, Jonathan Batiste, Ellis Marsalis Jr.
- Attendance: 17,271
- Network: TNT
- Announcers: Marv Albert, Doug Collins and Reggie Miller; Kevin Harlan, Reggie Miller, Mike Fratello, Charles Barkley, Kenny Smith and Magic Johnson (All-Star Saturday Night); Ernie Johnson, Charles Barkley and Kenny Smith (Rookie Challenge)

NBA All-Star Game
< 2007	2009 >

The 2008 NBA All-Star Game was an exhibition basketball game that was played on February 17, 2008, during the National Basketball Association's (NBA) 2007–08 season. It was the 57th edition of the NBA All-Star Game, and was played at New Orleans Arena in New Orleans, home of the New Orleans Hornets. The Eastern Conference defeated the Western Conference, 134–128. LeBron James was named the All-Star Game Most Valuable Player, his second time winning the award. This was the first NBA All-Star Game that was hosted by New Orleans, and was the city's first major professional sporting event (outside of regular season games) since the area was devastated by Hurricane Katrina in 2005. The city was awarded in an announcement by commissioner David Stern on May 22, 2006. The other reported contenders for the 2008 contest was Air Canada Centre at Toronto, who withdrew the bid early in 2005.

The East led early but blew a 16-point lead in the fourth quarter; ultimately, they pulled out the win due to the strength of Ray Allen and James. Allen scored 28 points in the game, 14 of them coming in the deciding quarter, and James finished with a near triple-double of 27 points, nine assists, and eight rebounds.

The inaugural NBA Development League Dream Factory Friday Night was modeled after the popular NBA All-Star Saturday Night. It included perennial NBA fan favorite events such as a Three-Point Shootout and Slam Dunk competition, while introducing H.O.R.S.E. and an interactive game of Hot-Shot with fans. Twelve D-League players, including an NBA-assigned player and five others with NBA experience, took to Center Court to showcase their skills throughout the evening's competitions.

All of the 2008 All-Star participants joined over 2,500 members of the NBA Family for the NBA Cares All-Star Day of Service. The volunteers participated in a variety of service projects at ten different sites throughout New Orleans.

== The All-Star Game ==
TNT

February 17
7:50 p.m. CT

East 134, West 128
Scoring by quarter: 34–28, 40–37, 32–28, 28–35

New Orleans Arena, New Orleans, Louisiana

=== Eastern Conference roster ===
The Boston Celtics, the team with the league's best record, came into New Orleans with three players. Kevin Garnett, top vote-getter in the league with 2,399,148 votes, was selected as a starter, while Paul Pierce and Ray Allen (replacing injured Washington Wizards forward Caron Butler) were selected as reserves by the coaches of the Eastern Conference Garnett did not play due to injury and Toronto Raptors forward Chris Bosh replaced him as starting power forward. Detroit Pistons forward Rasheed Wallace replaced Chris Bosh as the backup power forward. The Pistons, who at the time had the second-best record in the league, also had guards Chauncey Billups and Richard Hamilton participating.

Cleveland Cavaliers small forward LeBron James and Miami Heat shooting guard Dwyane Wade started for the fourth straight year and fourth overall for the East with two million votes each. Center Dwight Howard was voted to be a starting All-Star for the first time in his career after averaging 22 points and 15 rebounds for the first half of the season. Shaquille O'Neal was not voted in as a center for the first time in 15 years. Jason Kidd was voted in as the starting point guard for the East amid speculation that he would be traded to the Western conference (Dallas Mavericks).

=== Western Conference roster ===
Los Angeles Lakers guard Kobe Bryant, 2007 All-Star MVP, was the top vote-getter in the West with nearly 2,000,500. However days before the game, he was examined by Lakers' doctors and revealed a torn ligament in his right pinky finger. Deciding to put off required surgery until after the season, the Lakers appealed to the league to replace Bryant but league policy stated Bryant must play after playing in the last game before the break.

Denver Nuggets guard Allen Iverson was voted an All-Star for the second time since moving to Denver. Along with him, teammate Carmelo Anthony earned a starting nod at forward. Power forward Tim Duncan made his tenth straight appearance and center Yao Ming his sixth (Yao Ming was voted to All-Star Game 2007 but did not play). Three teams, Denver Nuggets, Phoenix Suns, and New Orleans Hornets, had two representations at the All-Star Game with Iverson/Anthony, Nash/Stoudemire, and Paul/West.

=== Rosters ===
Western Conference All-Stars
Pos.	Player	Team	# of selections	Total votes
Starters
G	Allen Iverson	Denver Nuggets	9	1,203,152
G	Kobe Bryant^{4}	Los Angeles Lakers	10	2,004,940
F	Carmelo Anthony	Denver Nuggets	2	1,723,701
F	Tim Duncan	San Antonio Spurs	10	1,712,800
C	Yao Ming	Houston Rockets	6	1,709,180
Reserves
F	Carlos Boozer	Utah Jazz	2	—
G	Steve Nash	Phoenix Suns	6	—
F	Dirk Nowitzki	Dallas Mavericks	7	—
G	Chris Paul	New Orleans Hornets	1	—
G	Brandon Roy	Portland Trail Blazers	1	—
C	Amare Stoudemire	Phoenix Suns	3	—
F	David West	New Orleans Hornets	1	—
Head coach: Byron Scott (New Orleans Hornets)

Eastern Conference All-Stars
Pos.	Player	Team	# of selections	Total votes
Starters
G	Jason Kidd	New Jersey Nets	9	1,246,386
G	Dwyane Wade	Miami Heat	4	1,608,260
F	LeBron James	Cleveland Cavaliers	4	2,108,831
F	Kevin Garnett^{1 3}	Boston Celtics	11	2,399,148
C	Dwight Howard	Orlando Magic	2	2,066,991
Reserves
G	Ray Allen^{2}	Boston Celtics	8	—
G	Chauncey Billups	Detroit Pistons	3	—
F	Caron Butler^{2}	Washington Wizards	2	—
F	Chris Bosh^{1}	Toronto Raptors	3	—
G	Richard Hamilton	Detroit Pistons	3	—
F	Antawn Jamison	Washington Wizards	2	—
G	Joe Johnson	Atlanta Hawks	2	—
F	Paul Pierce	Boston Celtics	6	—
C	Rasheed Wallace^{3}	Detroit Pistons	4	—
Head coach: Doc Rivers (Boston Celtics)

^1 Unable to participate due to injury. Chris Bosh was named to the starting lineup due to a Kevin Garnett injury
^2 Unable to participate due to injury. Ray Allen was named to the roster in place of Caron Butler.
^3 Unable to participate due to injury. Rasheed Wallace was named to the roster in place of Kevin Garnett.
^4 Kobe Bryant played three minutes due to ligament tear in pinky

=== Coaches ===
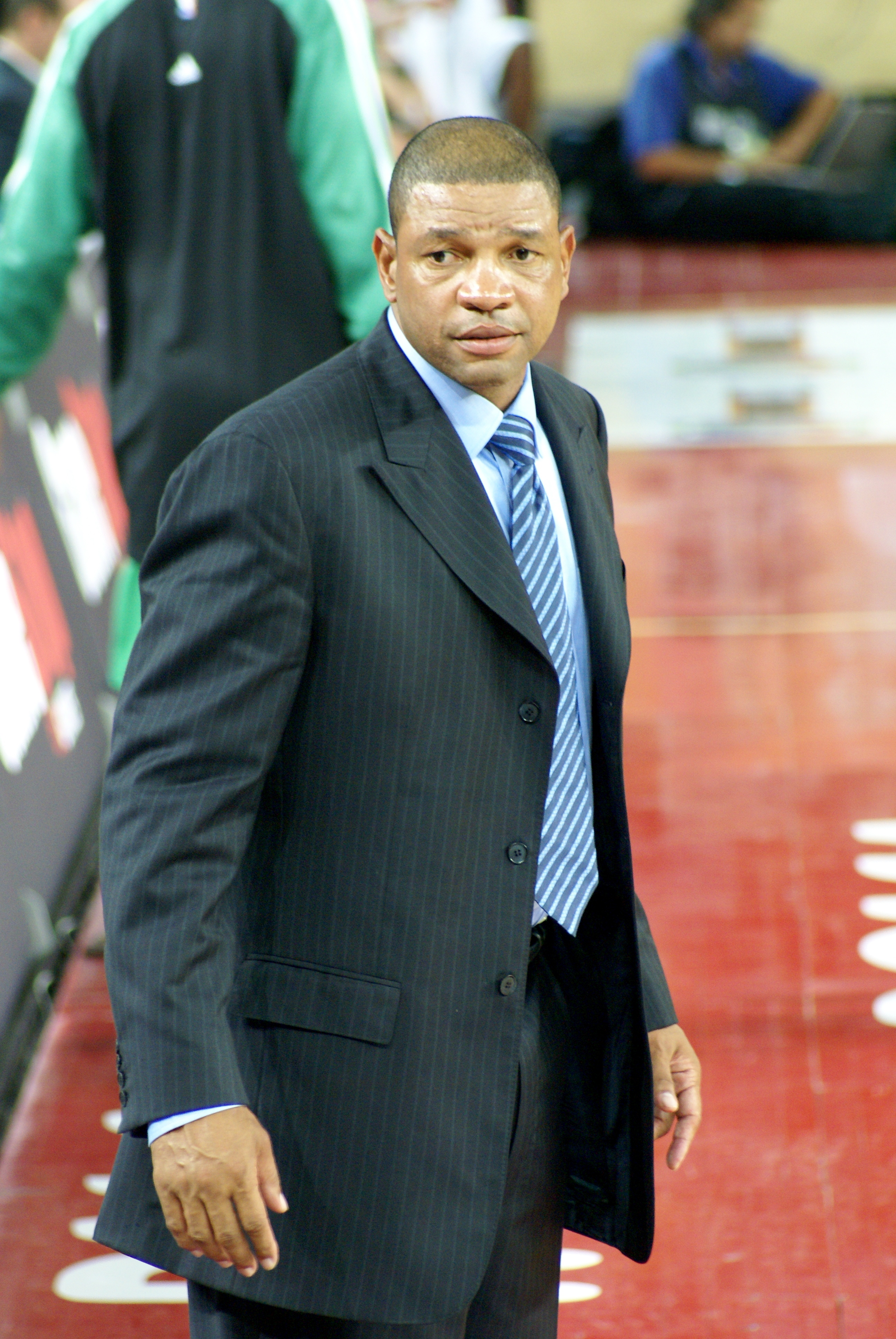
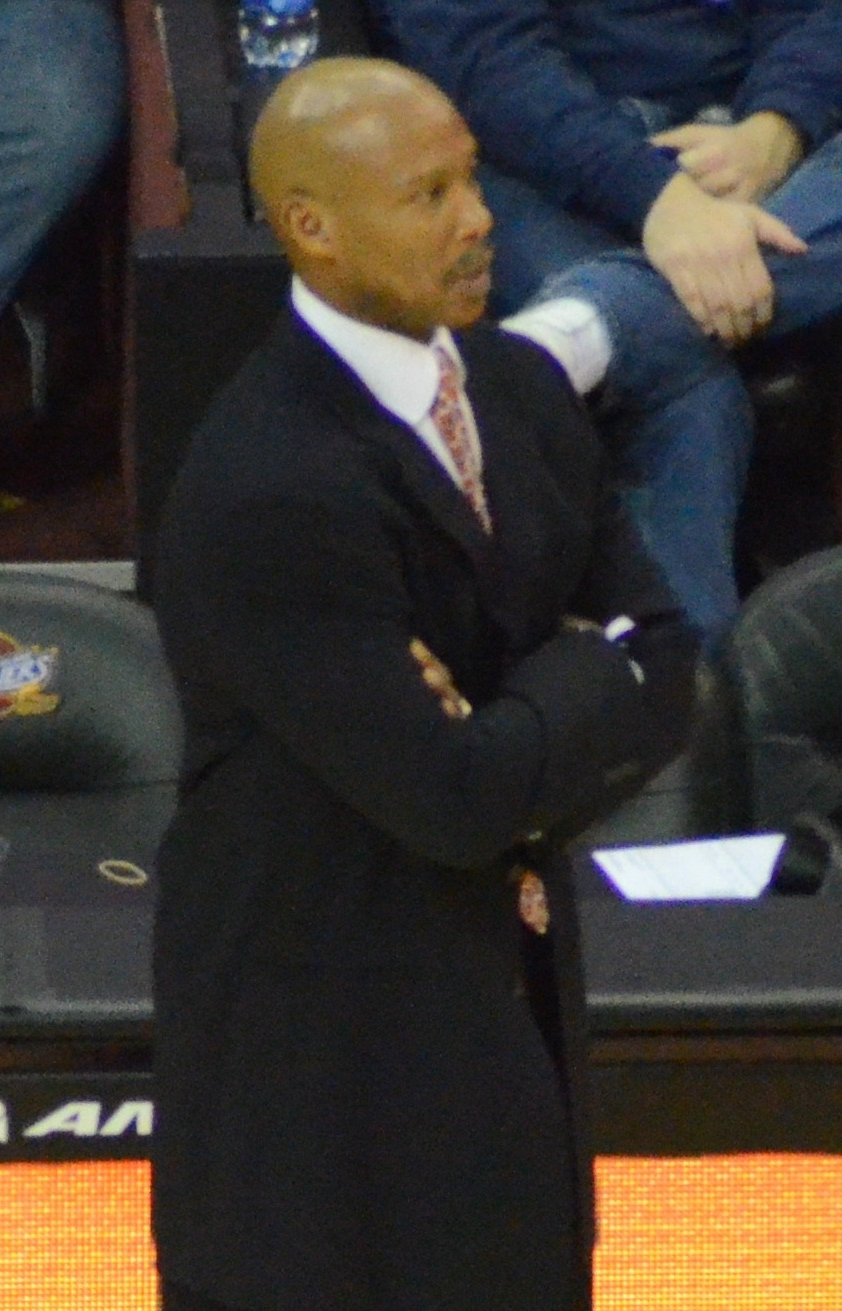
Doc Rivers (left) and Byron Scott (right) were selected as the East and West head coaches, respectively.

The Eastern Conference team was coached by Doc Rivers of the Boston Celtics. He clinched it nearly a month before the game on January 21, against the New York Knicks. The Celtics entered All-Star Weekend with a 41–9 record, the best record and win percentage in the league.

The Western Conference team was coached by Byron Scott of the New Orleans Hornets. Scott clinched the coaching spot on January 31, when the Dallas Mavericks lost to the Boston Celtics in Boston. The Hornets entered All-Star Weekend with a 36–15 record, and the best winning percentage in the Conference at .706.

=== 2008 NBA All-Star Game Boxscore ===
NBA All-Star East

Pos	Player	FGM-A	3PM-A	FTM-A	Off Reb	Def Reb	Tot Reb	Ast	PF	ST	TO	BS	BA	Pts
G	J. Kidd	1–2	0–1	0–0	0	4	4	10	0	4	1	0	0	2
G	D. Wade	7–12	0–1	0–2	1	3	4	3	1	0	2	1	1	14
F	C. Bosh	7–15	0–0	0–2	2	5	7	1	1	0	1	0	2	14
F	L. James	12–22	2–7	1–1	1	7	8	9	3	2	4	2	1	27
C	D. Howard	7–7	0–0	2–3	5	4	9	3	4	3	1	1	0	16
	R. Allen	10–14	5–9	3–5	0	2	2	1	0	2	0	0	0	28
	C. Billups	3–10	0–6	0–2	2	5	7	1	1	0	1	0	2	6
	R. Hamilton	4–9	1–1	0–0	0	0	0	2	0	0	0	0	1	9
	R. Wallace	1–5	1–5	0–0	2	3	5	0	2	1	1	2	0	3
	J. Johnson	1–2	1–1	0–0	0	0	0	2	1	1	1	0	0	3
	P. Pierce	5–9	0–3	0–0	0	4	4	2	0	0	2	0	0	10
	A. Jamison	1–3	0–2	0–0	0	1	1	0	0	0	2	1	0	2

NBA All-Star West

Pos	Player	FGM-A	3PM-A	FTM-A	Off Reb	Def Reb	Tot Reb	Ast	PF	ST	TO	BS	BA	Pts
G	A. Iverson	3–7	0–0	1–2	1	1	2	6	0	4	6	1	0	7
G	K. Bryant	0–0	0–0	0–0	0	1	1	0	0	0	0	0	0	0
F	T. Duncan	2–7	0–1	0–0	4	5	9	1	1	1	4	1	0	4
F	C. Anthony	8–17	0–0	2–3	5	2	7	1	0	0	2	0	1	18
C	M. Yao	2–5	0–2	2–2	1	4	5	1	0	0	1	0	1	6
	B. Roy	8–10	2–3	0–0	1	8	9	5	2	1	0	1	0	18
	C. Paul	7–14	2–6	0–0	2	1	3	14	5	4	2	0	1	16
	D. Nowitzki	5–14	1–4	2–2	1	3	4	2	0	0	2	0	1	13
	A. Stoudemire	8–11	1–2	1–3	0	5	5	0	2	1	1	1	0	18
	S. Nash	4–8	0–1	0–0	0	0	0	6	3	0	1	1	0	8
	C. Boozer	7–15	0–0	0–2	4	6	10	0	0	0	1	0	0	14
	D. West	3–6	0–0	0–0	2	2	4	1	1	0	1	0	3	6

== All-Star Weekend ==
=== T-Mobile Rookie Challenge ===
The Sophomores defeated the Rookies 136–109. During the first half of the game Daniel Gibson tied the record of Kyle Korver by hitting seven three-pointers (Korver's record was for the entire game). He later set the whole-game record in the second half with eleven total three-pointers, finishing the game shooting 11–20 from three-point range. Gibson was named MVP of the game, finishing with 33 points, 4 rebounds, 2 assists, and 2 steals.

February 15

Sophomores 136, Rookies 109
Scoring by half: 66–52, 70–57

New Orleans Arena, New Orleans, Louisiana

Rookies
Pos.	Player	Team
PG	Mike Conley Jr.	Memphis Grizzlies
SF	Kevin Durant	Seattle SuperSonics
SG	Jeff Green	Seattle SuperSonics
C	Al Horford	Atlanta Hawks
PF	Yi Jianlian	Milwaukee Bucks
SF	Jamario Moon	Toronto Raptors
SG	Juan Carlos Navarro	Memphis Grizzlies
PF	Luis Scola	Houston Rockets
C	Sean Williams	New Jersey Nets

Sophomores
Pos.	Player	Team
PF	LaMarcus Aldridge	Portland Trail Blazers
PF	Andrea Bargnani	Toronto Raptors
SG	Ronnie Brewer	Utah Jazz
PG	Jordan Farmar	Los Angeles Lakers
SF	Rudy Gay	Memphis Grizzlies
PG	Daniel Gibson	Cleveland Cavaliers
PF	Paul Millsap	Utah Jazz
PG	Rajon Rondo	Boston Celtics
SG	Brandon Roy	Portland Trail Blazers

=== Sprite Slam Dunk Contest ===
Gerald Green returned to defend his crown won in last year's All-Star game. Young NBA stars Rudy Gay, Dwight Howard and Jamario Moon were also invited. What made the Slam Dunk contest unique in 2008 was the introduction of the fan vote. While judges (in this particular contest, Karl Malone, Magic Johnson, Julius Erving, Darryl Dawkins and Dominique Wilkins) still scored dunks on a scale from one to fifty and selected those who would move on to the next round, fans had the last word. NBA viewers for the first time could decide the winner of the Sprite Slam Dunk contest, under the tag line "They Dunk. You Decide." For five minutes after the final round, polls were open on NBA.com and through SMS TXT and the dunker with the most votes at the end of the time limit was the winner. Dwight Howard won the contest, grabbing 78% of fan votes.

Contestants
Pos.	Player	Team	Ht.	Wt.
SF	Rudy Gay	Memphis Grizzlies	6–9	220
SG	Gerald Green	Minnesota Timberwolves	6–8	200
C	Dwight Howard	Orlando Magic	6–11	265
SF	Jamario Moon	Toronto Raptors	6–8	205

=== Foot Locker Three-Point Shootout ===
Jason Kapono became the first back-to-back winner of the Foot Locker Three-Point Shootout since Peja Stojaković won in 2002 and 2003. Kapono also tied the all-time record set in 1986 by Craig Hodges by scoring 25 points in the final round.

Contestants
Pos.	Player	Team	Made	Att.	Pct.
PG	Daniel Gibson	Cleveland Cavaliers	104	222	.468
SG	Richard Hamilton	Detroit Pistons	43	92	.467
SF	Jason Kapono	Toronto Raptors	50	98	.510
PG	Steve Nash	Phoenix Suns	101	216	.468
PF	Dirk Nowitzki^{1}	Dallas Mavericks	41	139	.295
SF	Peja Stojaković	New Orleans Hornets	122	264	.462

^1 Kobe Bryant was looking to be the first player to win a Slam Dunk contest and a Three-Point Shootout title until he was replaced by Dallas Mavericks forward Dirk Nowitzki due to injury.

=== PlayStation Skills Challenge ===
Utah Jazz guard Deron Williams won the Skills Challenge, with a first round time of 31.2 seconds and a record finish in 25.5 in his second run. For the first time since 2005, Dwyane Wade did not win the contest. He finished with a low 53.9 seconds, ending his streak at two. Jason Kidd, winner of the event in 2003, finished at 40 seconds. Chris Paul advanced to the finals with 29.9 seconds in the first go-around, but failed to match Williams in the end.

Contestants
Pos.	Player	Team	1st run	2nd run
PG	Jason Kidd	New Jersey Nets	39.7s	
PG	Chris Paul	New Orleans Hornets	29.9s	31.2s
SG	Dwyane Wade	Miami Heat	53.9s	
PG	Deron Williams	Utah Jazz	31.2s	25.5s

=== Haier Shooting Stars Competition ===
After an impressive run in the first round, Team San Antonio took care of business in the finals of the 2008 Haier Shooting Stars challenge against Team Chicago, as Duncan drained a half-court shot to give the Texas threesome a time of 35.8 seconds.

Contestants
Chicago
Chris Duhon	Chicago Bulls
Candice Dupree	Chicago Sky
B. J. Armstrong	Chicago Bulls (Retired)
Detroit
Chauncey Billups	Detroit Pistons
Swin Cash	Detroit Shock
Bill Laimbeer	Detroit Pistons (Retired)
Phoenix
Amare Stoudemire	Phoenix Suns
Cappie Pondexter	Phoenix Mercury
Eddie Johnson	Phoenix Suns (Retired)
San Antonio
Tim Duncan	San Antonio Spurs
Becky Hammon	San Antonio Silver Stars
David Robinson	San Antonio Spurs (Retired)

== D-League All-Star ==
=== D-League All-Star Game ===
Twenty of the NBA Development League's top players were selected to the D-League All-Star Game rosters by a combination of fan balloting on the official D-League website and voting by the 14 head coaches of D-League teams. The selections were divided up into two teams, the Red Team and the Blue Team, by members of the NBA and NBA D-League's Basketball Operations staff. Players who have been selected by coaches and fans must be on an active roster of a D-League team. Los Angeles D-Fenders head coach Dan Panaggio and Idaho Stampede head coach Bryan Gates were selected as the coach for the Blue Team and the Red Team respectively. Both coaches earned the honor by securing the best records in the D-League through January 31.

Blue Team
Pos.	Player	Team
G	Morris Almond	Utah Flash
F	Sean Banks	Los Angeles D-Fenders
G	Andre Barrett^{REP}	Bakersfield Jam
F	Rod Benson	Dakota Wizards
C	Kyrylo Fesenko	Utah Flash
G	Keith Langford	Austin Toros
F	Ian Mahinmi	Austin Toros
C	Jelani McCoy	Los Angeles D-Fenders
F	Carlos Powell	Dakota Wizards
F	Jeremy Richardson	Fort Wayne Mad Ants
G	C. J. Watson^{DNP}	Rio Grande Valley Vipers
Head coach: Dan Panaggio (Los Angeles D-Fenders)

Red Team
Pos.	Player	Team
C	Lance Allred	Idaho Stampede
F	Elton Brown	Colorado 14ers
F	Kaniel Dickens	Colorado 14ers
F	Nick Fazekas	Tulsa 66ers
G	Eddie Gill	Colorado 14ers
G	Randy Livingston	Idaho Stampede
G	Dwayne Mitchell	Iowa Energy
F	Kasib Powell	Sioux Falls Skyforce
G	Billy Thomas	Colorado 14ers
F	Cory Violette	Idaho Stampede
Head coach: Bryan Gates (Idaho Stampede)

^DNP Unable to participate due to a call-up to the Golden State Warriors.
^REP Named as replacement for C. J. Watson.

NBA TV

February 16
3:00 p.m.

Recap
Boxscore

Blue Team 117, Red Team 99
Scoring by quarter: 24–30, 29–13, 33–24, 31–32
Pts: Jeremy Richardson 22; Rebs: Benson, Mahinmi, McCoy 9 each Asts: Andre Barrett 7	Pts: Elton Brown 20; Rebs: Brown, Violette 10 each Asts: Gill, Livingston 7 each

Ernest N. Morial Convention Center, New Orleans, Louisiana
Referees:
- #74 Curtis Blair
- #15 Eric Dalen
- #58 Josh Tiven

=== D-League Dream Factory Friday Night ===
==== H.O.R.S.E. ====
Two preliminary rounds of two games each were played with the winners of the first two rounds competing in a final round for the title of H.O.R.S.E. Champion. Each round was capped at five minutes, and utilized a 24-second shot clock. Contestants were outfitted with a wireless microphone in order for fans to hear the player call his shot.

Lance Allred faced Fort Wayne's Jeremy Richardson. Both players were tied at the time limit, but Allred managed to advance in sudden death when Richardson could not convert on his attempt. In the other first-round matchup, Utah Jazz assignee Morris Almond advanced over Sioux Fall's Kasib Powell, as he held an H-O advantage at the time limit. In the final, Allred earned the victory over Almond when he sank a bank shot from just outside the elbow, leaving Almond facing an H-O deficit as time expired.

Contestants
Pos.	Player	Team
C	Lance Allred	Idaho Stampede
SG	Morris Almond	Utah Flash
SF	Kasib Powell	Sioux Falls Skyforce
SF	Jeremy Richardson	Fort Wayne Mad Ants

==== Hot-Shot ====
Hot-Shot contestants took to the floor to compete in a race against the clock to score the most points with the help of a D-League fan. Each team had one minute to tally the highest score from four designated shooting spots on the court, including a one-point layup, a two-point foul shot, a three-pointer from behind the arc, and a five-point half-court shot, with the fan only eligible to shoot from the lay-up position. Two teams competed simultaneously, one on each end of the court, during the first round with the winners advancing to a final round of head-to-head competition where the stakes were high – the fan from the winning squad had an opportunity to be a judge in the Slam Dunk Contest.

In the first round, Bakersfield's Andre Barrett came out on top with a total of 24 while Dakota's Carlos Powell checked in second with 23 points. Billy Thomas (20 points) and Randy Livingston (5 points) were eliminated after the first round.

In the second and final round, Powell and his teammate Will, a New Orleans resident, won the title with a total of 24, edging Barrett and company's total of 21.

Contestants
Pos.	Player	Team
PG	Andre Barrett	Bakersfield Jam
PG	Randy Livingston	Idaho Stampede
SF	Carlos Powell	Dakota Wizards
SG	Billy Thomas	Colorado 14ers

==== Three-Point Shootout ====
Each contestant had 60 seconds to sink up to 21 three-pointers from seven shooting stations assembled around the three-point line. Each station had two orange balls (worth one point each) and one "money" ball (worth two points) which may only be attempted after both orange balls have been shot. Fans enjoyed one preliminary round and a championship round featuring the contestants with the top two scores from the first round.

Adam Harrington dominated the contest, posting the highest score of all four competitors in the first round, and then edging Kaniel Dickens in the final round to earn the victory. Dickens advanced to the final via a 30-second shootout with Josh Gross after two players tied for the second best total in the opening round.

Contestants
Pos.	Player	Team	Made	Att.	Pct.
SF	Josh Gross	Albuquerque Thunderbirds	25	64	.391
SF	Kaniel Dickens	Colorado 14ers	88	202	.436
SF	Adam Harrington	Tulsa 66ers	49	100	.490
PG	Keith Langford	Austin Toros	43	101	.426

==== Slam Dunk Contest ====
The Slam Dunk Contest, which consisted of two rounds of two dunks each, began with each dunker submitting his top two dunks and selecting a fan from the crowd who chose the first dunk to be performed in the first round of competition. A composite total of the scores from the first round of dunks of competition was tallied for each dunker and the dunkers with the two highest scores competed in a championship round consisting of two dunk attempts. Contestants were allowed one replacement dunk per attempt.

The Idaho Stampede pair of Brent Petway and Mike Taylor emerged from the first round and headed to the finals. Petway emerged as the victor after he completed a spectacular through-the-legs dunk that brought down the house at Jam Session and earned a perfect 50 score. Taylor attempted to counter with a show-stopping dunk of his own, but failed to convert on his two allotted attempts. Fort Wayne's Eric Smith and Iowa's Doug Thomas also performed some impressive dunks, but did not record high enough scores from the judges to advance to the final round.

Contestants
Pos.	Player	Team	Ht.	Wt.
SF	Brent Petway	Idaho Stampede	6–8	210
SF	Eric Smith	Fort Wayne Mad Ants	6–8	220
SG	Mike Taylor	Idaho Stampede	6–2	165
SF	Doug Thomas	Iowa Energy	6–9	235

== Schedule ==
- February 15–17: NBA Jam Session (Ernest N. Morial Convention Center)
- Friday, February 15: NBA All-Star Celebrity Game
- Friday, February 15: 2008 Rookie Challenge
- Saturday, February 16: 2nd Annual D-League All-Star Game
- Saturday, February 16: NBA All-Star Saturday (Slam Dunk Contest, Three-Point Shootout, Shooting Stars Competition, Skills Challenge)
- Sunday, February 17: 57th Annual NBA All-Star Game

== Musical happenings ==
- Friday, February 15: Prior to the 2008 Rookie Challenge, Amanda Shaw performed the U.S. and Canadian anthems. Jordin Sparks performed "Tattoo" during halftime.
- Saturday, February 16: Prior to All-Star Saturday Night, Marc Broussard with the Dirty Dozen Brass Band, performed during the player introductions. Trumpeter Christian Scott performed the U.S. national anthem, while Lamont Hiebert performed the Canadian anthem. The same night, Dr. John paid tribute to NBA Cares, with a performance of "What a Wonderful World.
- Sunday, February 17: For the 57th Annual NBA All-Star Game, Harry Connick Jr. and Branford Marsalis collaborated on the performance lineup. Connick was the musical director for the halftime show, featuring four original compositions performed by four pairs of pianists including Dr. John, Allen Toussaint, Davell Crawford, Art Neville, Ivan Neville, Jonathan Batiste, Ellis Marsalis Jr., and Connick Jr. and his Big Band. Marsalis was the musical director for the All-Star Player introductions, featuring compositions by Marsalis performed by the Rebirth Brass Band. Trumpeter Kermit Ruffins and Trombone Shorty introduced the Western and Eastern Conference All-Star teams. Marsalis directed the U.S. national anthem performed by Stephanie Jordan and guitarist Jonathan Dubose. Deborah Cox performed the Canadian anthem.

== Broadcast ==
=== Television ===
==== NBA on TNT ====
The Turner Broadcasting Network televised the game for the fifth straight year in the United States. The game was called by NBA on TNT commentators Marv Albert, Reggie Miller and Doug Collins. TNT also televised the Sprite Slam Dunk Contest, PlayStation Skills Challenge, Footlocker Three-Point Shootout and the Haier Shooting Stars Competition.

==== ESPN ====
ESPN televised the McDonald's All-Star Celebrity Game on February 15. The event was simulcast on ESPN360.com, ESPN Mobile and ESPN Radio. Although the All-Star game was not broadcast on ESPN, the game was on ESPN Radio.

==== NBA TV ====
Beginning the week of the All-Star game, February 11, NBA TV aired tributes to moments in All-Star game history, including a top-10 list, highlights and greatest moments. NBA TV aired the Basketball Hall of Fame Finalist Friday, February 15. The network also provided the behind-the-scenes practices of the East and West rosters, the NBA D-League All-Star game, and pregame and postgame coverage of the All-Star Game.

==== International ====
The NBA vastly increased the global appeal of the All-Star Game, allowing 123 broadcasters to air the games in 215 countries in more than 40 languages. NBA TV covered All-Star weekend to another record 80 countries. Most foreign major sports networks aired the All-Star game live.
