= Kline =

Kline may refer to:

- Kline (surname)

== Places ==
- Klinë, a.k.a. Klina, in Kosovo

United States:

- Kline, Colorado
- Kline, Iowa, in Des Moines County, Iowa
- Kline, Louisiana, in Ouachita Parish, Louisiana
- Kline, Pennsylvania, in Clarion County, Pennsylvania
- Kline Township, Pennsylvania
- Kline, South Carolina
- Kline, Washington, in Lincoln County, Washington
- Kline, West Virginia

== Other ==
- USS Kline (APD-120), ex-DE-687
- Klinē, a.k.a. klinai, ancient furniture couch

== See also ==
- Klein (disambiguation)
- Cline (disambiguation)
- Clyne (disambiguation)
- K-line (disambiguation)
