= Charles Klein =

Charles Klein may refer to:

- Charles Klein (playwright) (1867–1915), English-born American playwright and actor
- Charles Klein (director) (1898–1981), German film director, screenwriter and novelist
- Charles H. Klein (1872–1961), American businessman and politician
- Chuck Klein (1904–1958), American baseball outfielder
- Chuck Klein (author) (born 1942), American author

== See also ==
- Charles H. Kline, mayor of Pittsburgh, 1925-1933
- Charles Cline (disambiguation)
