= Klein =

Klein may refer to:

== People ==
- Klein (surname)
- Klein (musician)
- Klein Kubiak (born 1991), American football executive

== Places ==
- Klein, Montana, United States, a census-designated place
- Klein, Texas, United States, an unincorporated community
- Klein (Ohm), a river of Hesse, Germany
- Klein River, Western Cape province, South Africa
- Klein (crater), a lunar feature

== Businesses ==
- Klein Bikes, a bicycle manufacturer
- Klein Tools, a manufacturer
- S. Klein, a department store
- Klein Modellbahn, an Austrian model railway manufacturer

== Arts ==
- Klein + M.B.O., an Italian musical group
- Klein Award, for comic art
- Yves Klein, French artist

== Other uses ==
- Kleins, Lineman's pliers, a hand tool used by electricians and others
- Klein Technique, a movement/dance technique developed by Susan Klein and studied by Garry Stewart
- Klein Moretti, a fictional character from Lord of Mysteries

== See also ==
- Kleine, a surname
- Kline (disambiguation)
- Cline (disambiguation)
