= Cline =

Cline may refer to:

== Science ==
- Cline (biology), a measurable gradient in a single trait in a species across its geographical range
- Cline (hydrology), a fluid layer with a property that varies
- Cline (mathematics) or generalised circle, a circle or straight line in inverse geometry
- Cline (linguistics):
  - Cline of instantiation, a concept in systemic functional linguistics
  - Cline of grammaticality in grammaticalization

== Other ==
- Cline (AI agent)
- Cline (fish) (Clinitrachus argentatus), a shallow water fish
- Cline (surname), a family name (including a list of persons with the name)
- Cline River, in Alberta, Canada
- Cline, Texas in Uvalde County, Texas
- Cline Avenue, a road in Indiana, US
- Antonov An-32, a military transport aircraft, whose NATO reporting name is "Cline"

== See also ==
- Clines, a surname
- Clinal, a torsion angle in alkane stereochemistry
- Clyne (disambiguation)
- Kline (disambiguation)
- Klein (disambiguation)
