= Jason Kapono =

American basketball player (born 1981)

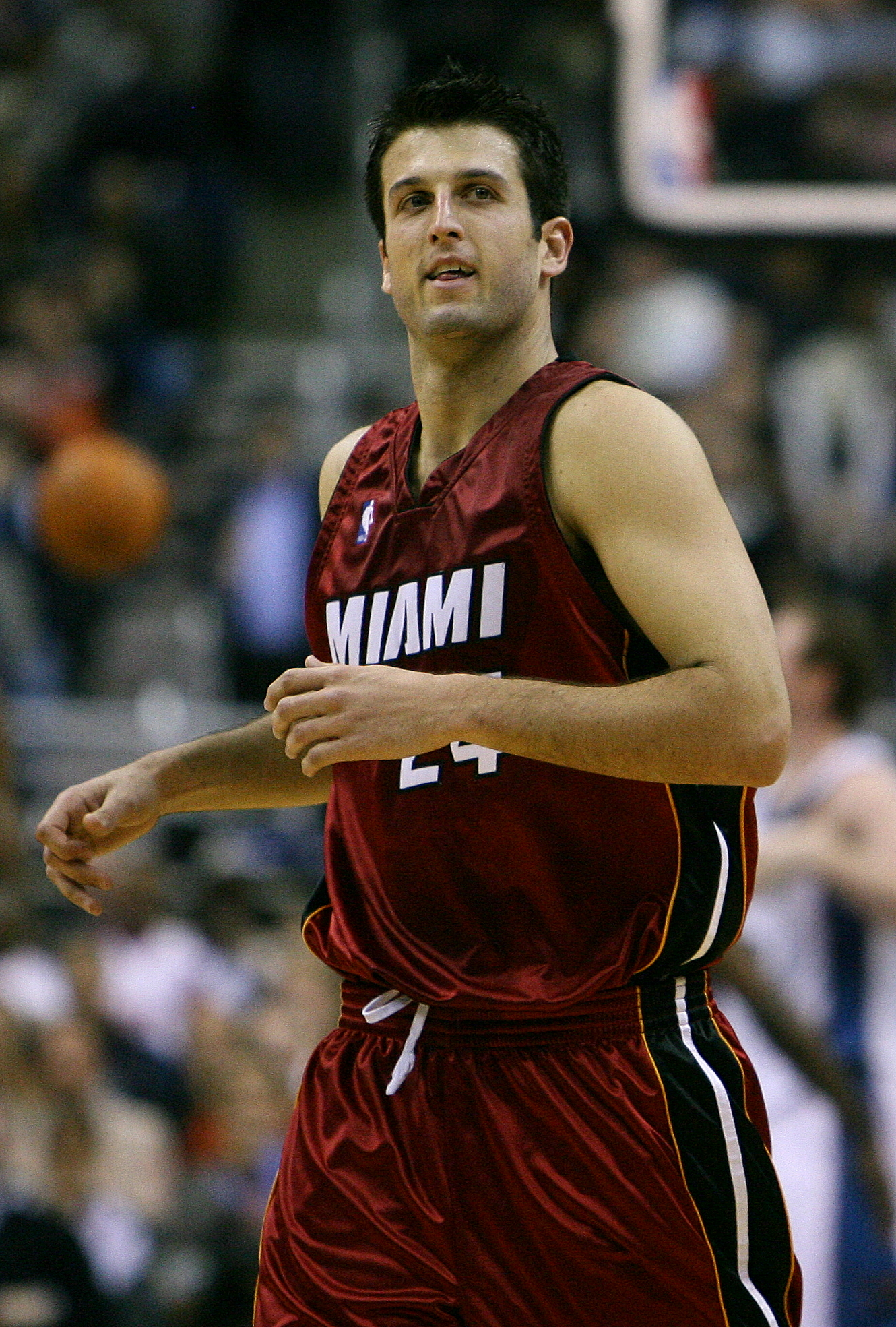
- Kapono with the Miami Heat in 2007

Personal information
- Born: February 2, 1981 (age 45) Long Beach, California, U.S.
- Listed height: 6 ft 8 in (2.03 m)
- Listed weight: 215 lb (98 kg)

Career information
- High school: Artesia (Lakewood, California)
- College: UCLA (1999–2003)
- NBA draft: 2003: 2nd round, 31st overall pick
- Drafted by: Cleveland Cavaliers
- Playing career: 2003–2013
- Position: Small forward
- Number: 24, 72, 28, 9

Career history
- 2003–2004: Cleveland Cavaliers
- 2004–2005: Charlotte Bobcats
- 2005–2007: Miami Heat
- 2007–2009: Toronto Raptors
- 2009–2011: Philadelphia 76ers
- 2011–2012: Los Angeles Lakers
- 2012–2013: Panathinaikos

Career highlights
- NBA champion (2006); 2× NBA Three-Point Contest champion (2007, 2008); Greek Cup champion (2013); 4× First-team All-Pac-10 (2000–2003); Pac-10 co-Freshman of the Year (2000); McDonald's All-American (1999)

Career statistics
- Points: 3,398 (6.7 ppg)
- Rebounds: 844 (1.7 rpg)
- Assists: 417 (0.8 apg)
- Stats at NBA.com
- Stats at Basketball Reference
Medals
Men's basketball
Representing United States
FIBA U21 World Championship
Gold medal – first place	2001 Saitama	Team competition

Jason Alan Kapono (kah-POH-noh; born February 2, 1981) is an American former professional basketball player. He was the first National Basketball Association (NBA) player to lead the league in three-point field goal percentage in two consecutive seasons, and also won the Three-Point Contest twice (2007, 2008). He won an NBA championship with the Miami Heat in 2006.

Kapono played college basketball for the UCLA Bruins. He was the first player in the school's history to earn first-team All-Pac-10 honors for four years and was also the first UCLA player to lead the team in scoring four straight years. Kapono began his NBA career with the Cleveland Cavaliers, who drafted him in the second round of the 2003 NBA draft. He later played in the NBA for the Charlotte Bobcats, Miami, Toronto Raptors, Philadelphia 76ers, and the Los Angeles Lakers before joining Panathinaikos B.C. in Greece.

== Early life ==
Kapono was born in Long Beach, California, to Joe and Joni Kapono. Jason prepped at Southern California basketball powerhouse Artesia High School in Lakewood, California, where he was a McDonald's All-American and won several accolades and titles. In his senior year at Artesia he averaged 23.5 points and 9.0 rebounds per game.

After a successful high school career, he enjoyed an outstanding college career at UCLA, where he finished as the third all-time leading scorer with 2,095 points, was the first Bruin to earn first-team All-Pac-10 honors all four years, and was the only UCLA player to lead the school in scoring four straight years. He also set a school record for most three-pointers made in a game when he connected on 9 of 11 attempts against Washington State on January 4, 2003. (Note: The record was tied by Bryce Alford when he made 9 of 11 on March 19, 2015.) Kapono graduated with a degree in history. He was a second-round draft choice of the Cleveland Cavaliers in the 2003 NBA draft.

== Professional career ==
=== Cleveland Cavaliers (2003–2004) ===
Kapono only played 41 games and started 3 in his first NBA season, although he led the team in three-point field goal percent at .477, averaging 3.5 PPG for his rookie season. He became an efficient 3-point shooter and was also good from the free-throw line, shooting 83%. The Cavaliers finished the season 37–45 and missed the playoffs.

=== Charlotte Bobcats (2004–2005) ===
After his rookie season with Cleveland, he was selected by the Charlotte Bobcats in the 2004 expansion draft, where he increased his scoring average from 3.5 to 8.5 points per game. He also made the first block in Bobcats history. Kapono also increased his assist and rebound average this season, although his total FG%, including his 3P%, slightly declined. This was the Bobcats first ever season and the team was very young and had potential, although they were very inexperienced. The Bobcats finished the season with an 18–64 record. Kapono was a free agent by the offseason, but the Bobcats decided to not re-sign him.

=== Miami Heat (2005–2007) ===
Kapono was signed as a free agent by the Miami Heat where he was part of the 2005–06 championship team. His scoring took a toll as he had a lesser role on the team, dropping down to 4.1 for the season, playing just 51 games in the season. Kapono won his first and only championship with the Heat during the 2006 NBA Finals. In the 2006–07 season, Kapono's points-per-game average and minutes played significantly increased, and he led the league in three-point percentage with .514, coming close to the all-time single-season three-point percentage record held by Kyle Korver (.536), and is the fourth best percentage in league season history. He averaged a career high in scoring, minutes, and rebounding. Kapono also won the Three-Point Contest in the 2007 All-Star Game three-point shoot-out competition by defeating Dirk Nowitzki and Gilbert Arenas in the final round with a score of 24 points, tying Mark Price's record for most points in a final round of the three-point contest. The 2006–07 season is greatly considered to be the best season of his career due to his accomplishments and statistics. Despite this, the defending champions had a disappointing season, finishing with an average 44–38 record and getting swept in the first round by the Chicago Bulls.

=== Toronto Raptors (2007–2009) ===
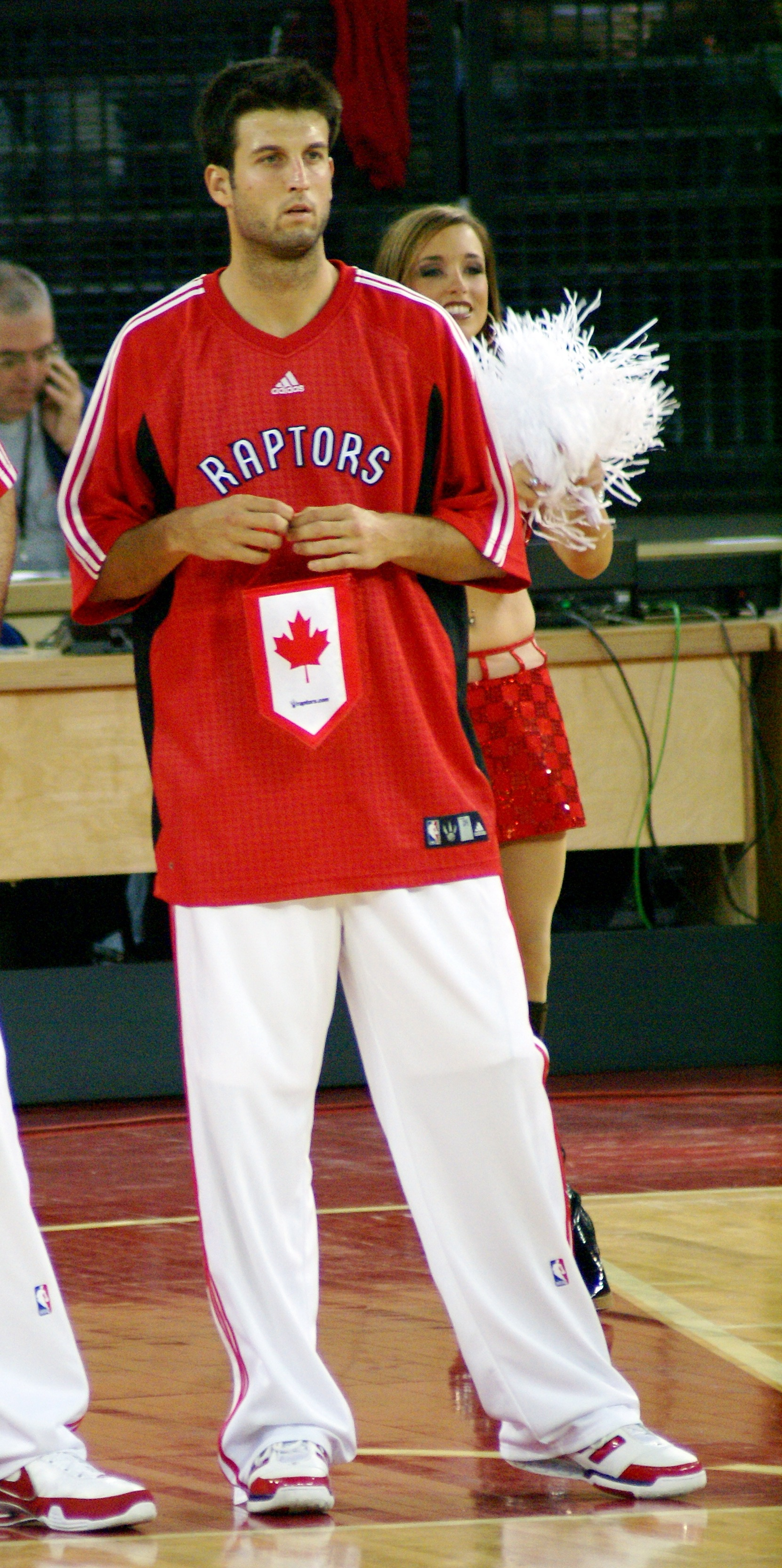
Kapono with the Raptors in 2007

Kapono became a free agent in the 2007 offseason and signed with the Toronto Raptors on July 11. His statistic averages went down following the 2006–07 season with the Heat, but he still played well. Kapono led the league in three-point percentage going into the 2008 All-Star Game. In the final round of the contest, he scored 25 points, tying the all-time single round record set in 1986 and also setting a new finals record. On December 14, 2007, he had a career-high 29 points and pulled down 8 rebounds. He also ended the 2007–08 season as the top three-point shooter in the league. He was the first player in NBA history to have the highest three-point percentage in two consecutive seasons. He helped the Raptors reach the 2008 playoffs. The team finished the season with a 41–41 record and placed 6th in the East and faced an up-and-coming Orlando Magic team who beat the Raptors 4–1. Later in the summer, Kapono was picked for the USA Basketball Select Team which trained with USA Men's Senior National Team in Las Vegas to assist in the buildup to the 2008 Summer Olympics. In the 2008–2009 season the Raptors missed the playoffs with a mediocre 33–49 record.

=== Philadelphia 76ers (2009–2011) ===
On June 9, 2009, Kapono was traded to the Philadelphia 76ers for Reggie Evans. Kapono was a victim of several starting lineup changes throughout the season. Kapono started the season with sparing minutes off the bench, but was later given the starting SF spot, near the end of the season. However, after losing his starting spot two games into the following season, Kapono was back to coming off the bench for sparing minutes. The team finished with an abysmal record for the 2009–10 season, going 27–55. The 76ers made the playoffs in 2011, but were outmatched by Kapono's former team, the Miami Heat. They lost the series 1–4, with Kapono averaging 0.7 PPG for that season and didn't make an appearance of the 2011 playoffs. After the 2010–11 NBA season came to an end, Kapono's contract with the 76ers expired and he became a free agent.

=== Los Angeles Lakers (2011–2012) ===
On December 9, 2011, Kapono signed with the Los Angeles Lakers. He only played 27 games for the Lakers. Kapono's final NBA game was played on March 14, 2012, in a 107–101 win over the New Orleans Hornets where he played for four minutes and the only stat he recorded was 1 assist.

=== Cleveland Cavaliers (2012) ===
On March 15, 2012, Kapono, along with Luke Walton and a 2012 first-round draft pick, were traded to the Cleveland Cavaliers for Ramon Sessions and Christian Eyenga. He didn't play any games for the Cavaliers and was waived 2 days later on March 17.

=== Panathinaikos (2012–2013) ===
On November 15, 2012, he signed with Panathinaikos B.C. of the Euroleague and Greek League. However, his arrival in Greece was delayed until December 11, as he remained in the United States due to complications with his wife's pregnancy. He won the Greek Cup with Panathinaikos in 2013. In March, he decided to leave the team due to limited playing opportunities.

=== Retirement ===
Kapono reportedly retired in May 2014. However, on October 4, 2014, he signed with the Golden State Warriors. He was later waived by the Warriors on October 24, 2014, after appearing in five preseason games. Kapono never played in the NBA again.

=== NBA record ===
At one point, Kapono was the most accurate three-point shooter in NBA history. On November 25, 2007, he made his 250th three-point shot, qualifying him for the NBA record in 3-point shooting accuracy. He immediately moved into first place with a .461 ratio of 3-point shots made to shots attempted, moving ahead of Steve Kerr, who had the previous lifetime best at .454. Kapono has since dropped behind Kerr and others.

== Career statistics ==
=== NBA ===
Legend
GP	Games played	GS	Games started	MPG	Minutes per game
FG%	Field goal percentage	3P%	3-point field goal percentage	FT%	Free throw percentage
RPG	Rebounds per game	APG	Assists per game	SPG	Steals per game
BPG	Blocks per game	PPG	Points per game	**Bold**	Career high
†	Won an NBA championship	*	Led the league

==== Regular season ====
Year	Team	GP	GS	MPG	FG%	3P%	FT%	RPG	APG	SPG	BPG	PPG
2003–04	Cleveland	41	3	10.4	.403	.477	.833	1.3	.3	.3	.0	3.5
2004–05	Charlotte	**81**	14	18.4	.401	.412	.824	2.0	.8	.5	**.1**	8.5
2005–06†	Miami	51	2	13.0	.446	.396	.848	1.4	.7	.1	**.1**	4.1
2006–07	Miami	67	**35**	**26.4**	**.494**	**.514***	.892	**2.7**	1.2	**.6**	.0	**10.9**
2007–08	Toronto	**81**	7	18.9	.488	.483*	.860	1.5	.8	.4	.0	7.2
2008–09	Toronto	80	12	22.9	.432	.428	.810	2.0	**1.3**	.3	.0	8.2
2009–10	Philadelphia	57	12	17.1	.419	.368	.600	1.2	.7	.4	**.1**	5.7
2010–11	Philadelphia	24	2	4.7	.250	.125	.500	.5	.2	.1	.0	.7
2011–12	L.A. Lakers	27	0	10.0	.382	.296	**1.000**	.5	.4	.1	.0	2.0
Career		509	87	17.8	.442	.434	.835	1.7	.8	.4	.0	6.7

==== Playoffs ====
Year	Team	GP	GS	MPG	FG%	3P%	FT%	RPG	APG	SPG	BPG	PPG
2006†	Miami	1	0	2.0	–	–	–	.0	.0	.0	.0	.0
2007	Miami	4	**1**	19.3	.471	.500	**1.000**	1.3	.5	**.5**	.0	5.0
2008	Toronto	**5**	0	**30.4**	**.585**	**.542**	.750	**2.6**	**.8**	.4	.0	**15.6**
Career		10	1	23.1	.557	.536	.833	1.8	.6	.4	.0	9.8

=== EuroLeague ===
Year	Team	GP	GS	MPG	FG%	3P%	FT%	RPG	APG	SPG	BPG	PPG	PIR
2012–13	Panathinaikos	8	0	15.3	.333	.462	.917	1.0	1.0	.0	.0	7.4	4.4
Career		8	0	15.3	.333	.462	.917	1.0	1.0	.0	.0	7.4	4.4

== Personal life ==
Kapono is of Hawaiian and Portuguese descent. He has a sister, Jillian. On August 28, 2004, he married Ashley Kapono (née Cline) and together they have four children. His father-in-law, Tony Cline, played football at the University of Miami and in the NFL for the Oakland Raiders, while his brother-in-law, Tony Cline Jr., played football at Stanford University and with the Buffalo Bills and San Francisco 49ers.

== See also ==
- List of NBA career 3-point field goal percentage leaders
- Toronto Raptors accomplishments and records
