= Murder of Peter Porco =

American murder case

- Location: Delmar, New York, U.S.
- Date: November 15, 2004; 21 years ago
- Attack type: Patricide
- Weapon: Axe
- Deaths: 1
- Injuries: 1
- Perpetrator: Christopher Porco
- Convictions: Second degree murder Attemped murder

On August 10, 2006, 23-year-old Christopher Porco (born July 9, 1983) was convicted of second-degree murder for the axe murder of his father, Peter Porco, and second-degree attempted murder after a similarly brutal attack on his mother, Joan Porco, left her severely wounded and permanently disfigured. The attacks were committed on November 15, 2004 at the home of Peter and Joan Porco in Delmar, New York.

== Murder case ==
=== Background ===
On November 15, 2004, Peter Porco, a 52-year-old state Appellate Division law clerk, was found dead from massive head injuries in his home in Delmar, New York. His wife, Joan Porco (née Balzano), a children's speech pathologist, was discovered lying in the couple's blood-drenched bed with severe head trauma; she survived the attack, but lost one eye and part of her skull and suffered severe facial disfigurement. Peter Porco "sustained 16 serious blows from a sharp, heavy instrument, including one that penetrated his skull and another that took off part of his jaw". Despite Peter's catastrophic injuries, he survived for several hours after the attack. After waking up, he carried out his morning routine before finally dying; he had written a check for his son Christopher, made a packed lunch and attempted to load the dishwasher in the kitchen before succumbing to his injuries.

An axe belonging to the family, which was used in the attack, was found in the garage. Bethlehem Police soon focused their investigation on Christopher Porco, the younger of the couple's two sons, who was a student at the University of Rochester. Christopher Porco was at the University of Rochester when his parents were discovered. He later said he learned of the attack from a reporter. He returned to Delmar that evening.

=== Prosecution ===
In late November 2004, outgoing Albany County District Attorney Paul Clyne convened a grand jury to hear testimony implicating Christopher Porco in the murder. Those who were reported to have testified in the closed-session hearing included Porco's friends from college, a university campus safety officer, and a former girlfriend. The grand jury would field more testimony before handing up an indictment against Christopher in November 2005, one year after the attacks. At that time, Albany County District Attorney David Soares asserted that the investigation had involved 22 different police and security agencies in various locations across the United States.

==== Burglaries ====
During the course of their investigation, authorities determined that Christopher Porco had a history of anti-social behavior that included burglarizing his parents' home. In 2005, Bethlehem Police detectives traveled to San Diego, California, to retrieve a laptop computer that Christopher Porco had stolen from his parents in a break-in on July 21, 2003. Porco had sold the laptop on eBay. Police contended that eight months earlier, on November 28, 2002, Christopher staged a burglary at his parents' home in which he stole a Macintosh laptop computer and a Dell laptop computer. One month before the attack, both Christopher and Johnathan Porco (his brother) had their eBay accounts frozen because they shared the same Delmar address. Christopher had not sent items to customers which they had paid for. Prosecutors discovered that Christopher had posed as his brother and sent emails to the customers falsely stating that his brother had died and was unable to deliver the items.

==== Burglar alarm ====
Trial testimony showed that on November 15, 2004, the Porco family's security code was used to disable the alarm system at their home. Hours later, a telephone line outside the Porco home was cut. Prosecutors asserted that Christopher Porco disabled the alarm and later cut the phone line to make the invasion of his parents' home appear to be a burglary.

==== Financial problems and forgeries ====
While away on a trip to England in March 2004, Christopher received an email from Joan Porco's account admonishing him for failing classes at Hudson Valley Community College in Troy, New York. In the message, Joan and Peter complained to their son, "You just left and (we) can't believe (our) eyes as I look at your interim grade report. You know what they say, 'Three strikes and you're out.' Explain yourself." The email's subject header was "Failing Grades-You did it again!". Several days later, Christopher replied in a message to his father. Blaming the community college's registrar, he wrote, "[B]ut obviously they are incorrect...My lowest grade that I got on anything was a B on a physics test...Don't jump to conclusions, I'm fine." Porco earned readmission to the University of Rochester with a forged transcript from Hudson Valley Community College. Judge Berry refused to allow prosecutors to use the forged transcripts as evidence in their criminal case against Christopher Porco.

Prior to the attack, there had been tension between Christopher Porco and his parents about money, including over loans Christopher had taken out to pay his tuition and to finance a new Jeep Wrangler. Following the fall 2003 semester, University of Rochester officials had forced Christopher Porco to withdraw because of poor grades. When he was readmitted the following year, he took out a loan for $31,000 from Citibank to pay his expenses, forging his father's name as a cosignatory. Unbeknownst to his parents, Christopher was attempting to pay his fall 2004 tuition with the loan money. Earlier in the fall, he falsely told his parents that the University of Rochester was covering his tuition because a professor had misplaced his final exam from the previous fall semester.

Two weeks before his murder, Peter Porco had confronted his son about his dishonesty in an email: "Did you forge my signature as a co-signer? ... What the hell are you doing? You should have called me to discuss it ... I'm calling Citibank this morning to find out what you have done and am going to tell them I'm not to be on it as a co-signer."

The following day, Peter Porco was notified that Christopher had also obtained a line of credit from Citibank to finance the Jeep Wrangler, again using his father's name as a cosignatory. Peter once again wrote to his son, who had not answered his parents' phone calls in weeks: "I want you to know that if you abuse my credit again, I will be forced to file forgery affidavits in order to disclaim liability and that applies to the Citibank college loan if you attempt to reactivate it or use my credit to obtain any other loan." The email concluded with: "We may be disappointed with you, but your mother and I still love you and care about your future."

==== Johnathan Porco ====
Porco's brother, Johnathan, testified at his trial. According to the Albany Times Union, Johnathan's testimony influenced the jury; his demeanor toward his brother was "icy", and he described their relationship as "strained".

==== Porco's character ====
Police contended that Christopher Porco's behavior was consistent with a diagnosis of psychopathy or sociopathy, two similar though not identical disorders characterized by pathological deception, scamming and defrauding others, and lack of conscience or remorse. For example, Porco lied to obtain both a car and tuition payments. He also lied to fellow students to make it appear that he came from a wealthy family with oceanfront homes.

Professor Frank Perri has argued that police interviews with Christopher Porco were seriously flawed because police questioning procedures seemingly failed to account for Porco's probable psychopathy.

==== Porco's movements ====
Christopher Porco told investigators that on the night of November 14, he retired to a dormitory lounge to sleep and awoke the following morning. The police theory was that he drove more than three hours to Albany in the early hours of November 15 to attack his parents. A New York State Thruway toll collector outside Rochester said a yellow Jeep Wrangler with large tires passed through his station at about 10:45 p.m. on November 14, and a collector in Albany recalled the "excessive speed" of a yellow Jeep Wrangler approaching the toll plaza shortly before 2 a.m. on November 15.

Four security cameras at the University of Rochester recorded a yellow Jeep Wrangler like Porco's leaving the campus at 10:30 p.m. on November 14 and returning at 8:30 a.m. on November 15, this being the period during which prosecutors claim the Porcos were attacked.

A neighbor of the Porco family later testified at trial that he saw Porco's yellow Jeep in the family's driveway on the evening of the attack. Also, University of Rochester students testified that they did not see Porco sleeping in a dormitory lounge on the night of the attack.

==== Veterinary clinic job ====
Porco's employer, veterinarian John Kearney, testified at trial that Porco had been trained in cleaning up after animal surgeries. After the trial, jurors commented that this testimony helped to explain the fact that police did not find blood in Porco's vehicle after the attack.

==== Witness identification ====
Christopher Bowdish, a Bethlehem Police detective, stated that, as medical personnel attended to Joan Porco at her home, he took a moment to ask her whether she could identify her attacker. Bowdish said that when he asked Joan if a family member had committed the crime, Joan used her head to indicate "yes". Bowdish has maintained that when he asked her whether it had been her older son Johnathan, a Naval officer stationed in South Carolina, she shook her head to indicate "no". However, when Officer Bowdish asked if her son Christopher was responsible, she was said to have nodded her head up and down, indicating "yes". She also answered in similar ways to other separate questions.

After Joan Porco emerged from a medically induced coma, she stated that she was unable to remember the attack and asserted that she believed her son Christopher to be innocent. During videotaped testimony submitted to the grand jury in December 2004, Joan testified about her family, but did not identify her son as an attacker. Nine months later, she wrote a letter for publication in the Albany Times Union in which she urged authorities to leave Christopher alone and "to search for Peter's real killer or killers, so that he can rest in peace and my sons and I can live in safety."

=== Defense arguments ===
Defense attorney Terence Kindlon emphasized that the Bethlehem Police Department had no physical evidence linking Christopher Porco to the attack on his parents. No fingerprints were recovered from the ax (which had previously been stored in the Porco's garage) found at the scene of the crime.

In statements to the press and criminal proceedings, Kindlon suggested that the Bethlehem Police Department had made Christopher Porco's guilt a foregone conclusion. During his opening remarks to jurors on June 27, 2006, Kindlon described the Bethlehem Police as unfamiliar with a serious crime investigation, describing them as a department "that chases skateboarders away from the 7-11 ...This is not the FBI."

Kindlon's co-counsel and wife Laurie Shanks maintained that police had overlooked the possibility that Peter Porco's death was the result of retaliation against his uncle Frank Porco, a captain in the Bonanno crime family in New York City (despite the fact that they had, indeed, followed that lead – Frank Porco had served two years in prison for loansharking and extortion, although Shanks incorrectly told jurors that he had been indicted for his involvement in a murder). Shanks noted that Frank Porco's nickname with the mob was "The Fireman," which could have had something to do with the type of murder weapon found (an axe that he and his wife had dubbed a "fire axe"). Frank had served in the New York City Fire Department.

=== Trial, conviction, and sentencing ===
The Porco trial began on June 27, 2006. The trial was held in Orange County because of intense media coverage in the Albany area, in addition to the fact that Albany County judges were recused because Peter Porco worked in the courthouse as a law clerk. The people were represented by Albany County's chief assistant prosecutor, Michael McDermott.

On August 2, 2006, the prosecution completed its case against Porco, and the defense's case, which was much briefer, began.

On the morning of August 10, 2006, the jury began deliberations. Later that day, Porco was found guilty of second degree murder and attempted murder.

On December 12, 2006, Judge Jeffrey Berry sentenced Porco to 25 years to life on each count, totaling a minimum of 50 years in prison. Judge Berry was quoted as saying, "I fear very much what happened in the early morning hours of November 15 is something that could happen again." Porco will be eligible for parole in December 2052.

=== Aftermath ===
Christopher Porco is incarcerated at Clinton Correctional Facility. He appealed his conviction to the Appellate Division, Third Department and to the New York Court of Appeals, but both courts rejected his appeals. He also appealed to the U.S. Supreme Court, which declined to hear his case without opinion.

In 2006, the Porco case was the subject of an hourlong episode of CBS's 48 Hours. The Porco case was discussed in a 2009 episode of Forensic Files.

In 2013, Lifetime aired a movie entitled Romeo Killer: The Chris Porco Story; Porco sued in an attempt to block the release of the movie.

On January 12, 2023, attorneys for Porco filed a motion to vacate his conviction on the grounds that he had been deprived of due process due to ineffective assistance of counsel. On the same day, News 10 ABC aired a prison interview between WTEN reporter John Gray and Christopher Porco. In the interview, Porco maintained his innocence.

As of February 2025, Schenectady County Executive Assistant District Attorney was handling the Porco case due to a conflict of interest within the Albany County District Attorney's Office. Albany County District Attorney Lee Kindlon is the son of Porco's trial counsel, Terry Kindlon.
