= Clyne =

Clyne may refer to:

== People ==
- Clyne (surname) (includes listing for Clynes)

== Places ==
=== United Kingdom ===
- Clyne, Neath Port Talbot, Wales
- Clyne, Highland, in Highland council area
- Clyne Castle, Swansea, Wales
- Clyne Common, lowland area of common land in the Gower Peninsula, Wales
- Clyne Gardens, botanical garden, Swansea, Wales
- Clyne River, river in Swansea, Wales
- Clyne Valley Country Park, Swansea, Wales

== Fictional characters ==
- Lacus Clyne, in Mobile Suit Gundam Seed anime franchise
- Siegel Clyne, in Mobile Suit Gundam Seed anime franchise

== Others ==
- Roger Clyne and the Peacemakers, rock band from Tempe, Arizona, USA

== See also ==
- Cline (disambiguation)
- Kline (disambiguation)
- Klein (disambiguation)
