= Clines =

Clines is a surname. Notable people with the surname include:

- Gene Clines (1946–2022), American baseball player and coach
- Hoyt Franklin Clines (1956–1994), American murderer
- Mike Clines (fl 2022), American politician
- Peter Clines (born 1969), American author and novelist
- Thomas G. Clines (1928–2013), American spy

== See also ==
- Cline (disambiguation)
