= David Soares =

American politician (born 1969)

- Soares in June 2008

District Attorney of Albany County
- In office January 1, 2005 – December 31, 2024
- Preceded by: Paul Clyne
- Succeeded by: Lee Kindlon

Personal details
- Born: October 26, 1969 (age 57) Brava, Cape Verde
- Party: Democratic
- Education: Cornell University (BS); Albany Law School (JD)
- Occupation: Attorney

P. David Soares (born October 26, 1969, in Brava, Cape Verde) is an American politician, attorney, and the former Albany County, New York District Attorney. He is a Democrat.

== Personal life ==
Soares was the youngest of the six children of Lucas and Lidia Soares. He was raised in Pawtucket, Rhode Island. Soares and his wife Stacey live in Glenmont, New York, and have two young children. He has two children from a previous marriage.

== Law career ==
Soares worked his way through Albany Law School as an intern for the Albany International Airport Authority, and later for the Albany County, New York District Attorney's office. He also worked with the Albany Law School AIDS law clinic for prisoners' legal services. Upon graduation, he was hired as an assistant district attorney by then-DA Sol Greenberg.

== Political career ==
=== 2004 election ===
On November 2, 2004, Soares was elected as Albany County District Attorney. He defeated incumbent District Attorney Paul Clyne in a Democratic primary, and in the general election he defeated Clyne (Independence Party) and Roger J. Cusick (Republican).
September 2004 Democratic Primary election for district attorney

- David Soares, 14,909 votes, or 60.5%
- Paul Clyne, 9,741 votes, or 39.5%

November 2004 election for district attorney

- David Soares (D), 75,610 votes, or 54.6%
- Roger J. Cusick (R), 57,202 votes, 41.3%
- Paul Clyne (I), 5,677 votes, or 4.1%

Prior to the Democratic primary election for DA of Albany County, New York, Paul Clyne had been considered a "shoo-in" incumbent by the local political establishment. This prediction, however, failed to materialize when Soares won by a landslide. Soares' campaign received third-party support from the progressive, union-backed Working Families Party, which viewed Soares' victory as a sign of its own influence and of a mandate for reform of New York's Rockefeller drug sentencing laws (which were opposed by Soares, but supported by Clyne). Michael Slackman of The New York Times stated that the Party had "established itself as an emerging political force statewide by getting a little-known candidate elected district attorney in Albany County." Soares' victory was called one of the "most stunning upsets in New York political history." The New York Times noted the unusual nature of that upset the day that almost all incumbents won easy re-election.

=== 2008 re-election campaign ===
Former DA Clyne, who lost to current DA Soares by a landslide in the 2004 Democratic primaries, initially contemplated opposing his successor for re-election; but eventually he decided not to run. For a moment it looked as though Soares might run unopposed since no candidate from either major parties, Democratic or Republican, had filed to run for the office of District Attorney of Albany County before the deadline to file expired. However, since there was still time left for independent candidates to file, Roger Cusick, a Republican, who had opposed DA Soares in 2004 and lost, declared himself as an independent candidate on August 18, one day before the deadline to file as an independent candidate would have expired. Cusick was able to get enough signatures to put himself in the ballot list. He once again opposed DA Soares in the November 2008 election.

In November 2008, Soares won re-election by a landslide, 73% to 27%, with a 50,000 vote margin.

November 2008 election for district attorney

- P. David Soares (D), 80,441 votes, or 73%
- Roger J. Cusick (I), 29,128 votes, or 27%

After a canvass, including the counting of all absentee ballots, the vote was 75,857 for Soares on the Democratic line, 6,548 on the Independence Party line, and 4,882 on the Working Families Party line, for a total of 87,287. Cusick received 31,996 votes, and there were 24 "scattered" and "void", or write-in votes. There were 29,526 blank votes.

=== 2012 re-election campaign ===
Attorney Lee Kindlon announced his plans to challenge Soares in a Democratic Party primary in 2012. Soares was endorsed for re-election by the Albany Times Union.

Soares won the primary on September 13, 2012, by an unofficial count of 14,498 to 10,1432.

=== 2024 re-election campaign ===
Soares was defeated in a Democratic primary by criminal defense attorney Lee Kindlon, who had unsuccessfully challenged him 12 years earlier, by a margin of 55-45%. Soares ran a write-in campaign in the general election, losing to both Kindlon and Republican nominee Ralph Ambrosio.

=== Political career plans ===
There was speculation in early 2007 in the local and national media that Soares might run for re-election as District Attorney, or for higher office, in 2008.

Soares was featured in Vibe Magazine, in which interview he discussed his goals and hopes for his career. On October 26, 2007, Soares was mentioned in the largest local daily newspaper as a possible replacement for Congressman Mike McNulty in the 2008 race for Congress in the 21st congressional district of New York. However, Soares opted to run for re-election in 2008 instead.

=== Political criticism ===
Soares has faced some criticism. His drug policy reform position has been disputed by at least one defense lawyer, while some members of Albany police and others consider Soares as "soft" on drug crimes. He has been criticized for his prosecution of defendants from Florida for selling steroids to residents of Albany County.

Some feel the criticism is politically motivated, and his supporters and independent pundits applaud Soares's progressive approach to criminal prosecution in Albany County. In an editorial, the Times Union noted, "Mr. Soares has rightly concluded that it would serve no purpose to seek a perjury indictment of Mr. Spitzer because the former governor did not speak with the district attorney's office under oath." Soares claims to be "unfazed by critics."

In 2011, Soares was criticized by members of both major parties for declining to prosecute participants in the Occupy Albany demonstrations who were arrested for violating a curfew in Albany's Academy Park. During an interview with Keith Olbermann, Soares called Occupy Albany a "wonderful protest," and stated that "we would decline to prosecute any of the cases, any of the arrests, based upon the fact that unless there were injuries to police officers or damages to property, then the people should be allowed to exercise their First Amendment right." Albany County Republican Party Chairman Don Clarey described Soares' decision not to prosecute as being "politically motivated," while attorney Lee Kindlon, who lost a challenge to Soares in a Democratic primary in 2012, accused Soares of violating his oath of office. Soares beat Kindlon handily in a primary that year, illustrating that Kindlon's argument did not negatively influence voters in the least. In addition, the Working Families Party circulated a petition supporting Soares' decision not to prosecute the Occupy protesters.

Soares received criticism from one Albany County official for arguing back vacation pay to an assistant district attorney whom he had dismissed. Michael Conners, County Comptroller, noted his supposed hypocrisy, since Soares had received his past due pay when Clyne had fired him. Soares distinguished the two cases, because he fired the ADA for cause, while he had been fired for running against his boss.

== Awards and Public Recognition ==
Soares has received several public service awards during his tenure as District Attorney, including being named a 2015 "America's Top 10 Animal Defender" by the Animal Legal Defense Fund, and the Whitney M. Young Community Partner of the Year Award in 2014 for hosting HIV/AIDS testing at the office's Community Justice and Outreach Center in Albany.

As of 2016, Soares serves as the 1st Vice President of the District Attorneys Association of the State of New York (DAASNY) and is a board of directors at the New York State Prosecutors Training Institute. Soares served as President of DAASNY from July 2018 through July 2019.

== Prosecutions ==
=== Murder of Peter Porco and other notable cases ===
Soares' office's first big case was the murder case of Peter Porco, an attorney, in 2005. ADA Michael McDermott and ADA David Rossi secured a guilty verdict for the murder against Porco's son, Christopher Porco after a change of venue moved the case to Orange County, NY. Christopher Porco was sentenced to 50 years to life in prison. In October 2011, the New York Court of Appeals upheld Porco's conviction. The case was profiled by several media outlets, including the Lifetime TV Network's rendition entitled "Romeo Killer: The Chris Porco Story."

Other notable cases handled by Soares' office include the double murder conviction of People vs. Edward Mero and People vs. De Von Callicutt.

=== Government integrity prosecutions ===
In October 2006, Soares opened an investigation into New York State Comptroller Alan Hevesi on allegations of defrauding the government. On December 22, 2006, Hevesi accepted a plea bargain from Soares which called for Hevesi to plead guilty to one count of defrauding the government based on his personal use of state employees to care for his ailing wife, in lieu of a grand jury indictment.

On January 3, 2007, Soares said he would open investigations into wrongdoings in the New York state departments of Education, Health, Motor Vehicles, Labor and Insurance.

Soares investigated the so-called Troopergate scandal in August and September 2007, and found that Governor Eliot Spitzer and his staff broke no laws. He re-opened his investigation amid much criticism.

=== Steroids prosecutions ===
The Free Press office under Soares has prosecuted several defendants for selling illegal steroids to Major League Baseball players, and representatives of the Mitchell Commission met at least twice with Soares over this issue. Soares secured the conviction of a physician who prescribed steroids to baseball players and other persons who the doctor had never examined.

=== Grants and bonus controversy ===
Media reports in February 2024 revealed that Soares was under investigation for directing state grant money received by his office to fund nearly $24,000 in bonuses for himself. Soares, who earned a salary of $208,000 per year, insisted his actions were legal but pledged in a video to return the money "to change the conversation." New York State Assemblyman Phillip G. Steck, a Democrat whose district includes Albany County, called on Soares to resign. The controversy had threatened to derail Soares' reelection campaign. The Albany County Democratic Committee declined to endorse any candidates in the 2025 Albany County District Attorney primary.

Legal offices
Preceded by Paul Clyne	Albany County District Attorney; January 1, 2005 – December 31, 2024	Succeeded by Lee Kindlon
