= Christine Klein =

German physician and academic

- Education: University of Hamburg; University of Lübeck
- Scientific career
- Workplaces: University of Lübeck

Christine Klein is a German physician who is a professor of neurology and neurogenetics at the University of Lübeck. Her research considers the molecular genetics of movement disorders. She is a Fellow of the European Academy of Neurology, former President of the German Neurological Society and incoming President of the European Section of the International Parkinson and Movement Disorder Society.

== Early life and education ==
Klein studied medicine at the University of Hamburg. She completed internships in Stockholm, Wollongong and Vitebsk. In 1997, she moved to Boston, where she was a fellow in neurogenetics with Xandra O. Breakefield. She completed her final year studies at the UCL Queen Square Institute of Neurology. She finished her training in neurology at the University of Lübeck, and spent several summers working with Anthony E. Lang in Toronto.

== Research and career ==
In 2005, Klein was made the Lichtenberg Professor in the University of Lübeck Department of Neurology. Her research considers the molecular genetics of movement disorders. She has extensively studied the genetics of Parkinson's disease, and has identified several genetic risk factors that increase the likelihood of developing Parkinson's. She was made Schilling Professor of Clinical and Molecular Neurogenetics in 2013, and appointed Director of the Institute of Neurogenetics.

In 2019, Klein became President of the German Neurological Society. She was the first women to chair the 10,000+ member society.

== Awards and honours ==
- 2014 BioMedTech Prize
- 2019 C. David Marsden Lecture Award
- 2019 Cotzias Award of the Spanish Society of Neurology
- 2021 Elected to the National Academy of Sciences Leopoldina

== Selected publications ==
- Javier Simón-Sánchez; Claudia Schulte; Jose M Bras; et al. (December 2009). "Genome-wide association study reveals genetic risk underlying Parkinson's disease". Nature Genetics. 41 (12): 1308–12. doi:10.1038/ng.487. ISSN 1061-4036. PMC 2787725. PMID 19915575. Wikidata Q24646654.
- Alberto Albanese; Kailash Bhatia; Susan B Bressman; et al. (6 May 2013). "Phenomenology and classification of dystonia: a consensus update". Movement Disorders. 28 (7): 863–873. doi:10.1002/mds.25475. ISSN 0885-3185. PMC 3729880. PMID 23649720. Wikidata Q34343247.
- Mike A Nalls; Nathan Pankratz; Christina M Lill; et al. (September 2014). "Large-scale meta-analysis of genome-wide association data identifies six new risk loci for Parkinson's disease". Nature Genetics. 46 (9): 989–93. doi:10.1038/ng.3043. ISSN 1061-4036. PMC 4146673. PMID 25064009. Wikidata Q28244731.
