= Xandra Breakefield =

American neurologist and academic

Xandra Owens Breakefield
- Education: Georgetown University; Wilson College
- Scientific career
- Workplaces: Harvard Medical School; Massachusetts General Hospital
- Thesis: Bacterial division : studies using a temperature-sensitive septationless mutant of Bacillus subtilis (1972)

Xandra Owens Breakefield is an American neurologist and professor of neurology at the Harvard Medical School. Her research makes use of molecular genetics to understand the origins of inherited neurological diseases.

== Early life and education ==
As a child, Breakfield was undecided about what she would do when she grew up. Her mother told her she had to attend college or work in a dime store, so Breakefield decided to attend college. Breakefield enrolled as an undergraduate at Wilson College, where she discovered the joy of learning. She was an undergraduate at the time that DNA had first been described, which inspired her to pursue something scientific. She earned her doctorate at Georgetown University, then was a postdoctoral researcher at the National Institutes of Health, where she worked alongside Marshall Warren Nirenberg. She then moved to the United States' first human genetics laboratory. She was inspired by human genetics, and eventually led the team that discovered the genetic markers for the dystonia gene.

== Research and career ==
Breakefield's early work considered the nerve growth factor, a protein involved in the development of sensory neurons, catechol-O-methyltransferase and monoamine oxidase.

Breakefield uses molecular genetics to understand inherited variations in neurological disease. To achieve this, she uses new viral vectors to enhance gene delivery and develops new therapeutic modalities. In particular, she has developed strategies to identify the genes that cause movement disorders (e.g. early-onset torsion dystonia and X-linked dystonia parkinsonism). In addition, she has studied the extracellular vesicles that are released by cells of brain tumor, looking at how they modify their microenvironment to promote tumor growth.

== Awards and honors ==
- Mathilde Solowey Neuroscience Award
- NARSAD Distinguished Investigator Award

== Selected publications ==
- Brunner, H. G.; Nelen, M.; Breakefield, X. O.; Ropers, H. H.; van Oost, B. A. (1993-10-22). "Abnormal Behavior Associated with a Point Mutation in the Structural Gene for Monoamine Oxidase A". Science. 262 (5133): 578–580. Bibcode:1993Sci...262..578B. doi:10.1126/science.8211186. ISSN 0036-8075. PMID 8211186.
- Skog, Johan; Würdinger, Tom; van Rijn, Sjoerd; Meijer, Dimphna H.; Gainche, Laura; Curry, William T.; Carter, Bob S.; Krichevsky, Anna M.; Breakefield, Xandra O. (December 2008). "Glioblastoma microvesicles transport RNA and proteins that promote tumour growth and provide diagnostic biomarkers". Nature Cell Biology. 10 (12): 1470–1476. doi:10.1038/ncb1800. ISSN 1465-7392. PMC 3423894. PMID 19011622.
- EL Andaloussi, Samir; Mäger, Imre; Breakefield, Xandra O.; Wood, Matthew J. A. (2013-04-15). "Extracellular vesicles: biology and emerging therapeutic opportunities". Nature Reviews Drug Discovery. 12 (5): 347–357. doi:10.1038/nrd3978. ISSN 1474-1776. PMID 23584393. S2CID 205478102.
