= Laureen Nussbaum =

German-American scholar and writer (born 1927)

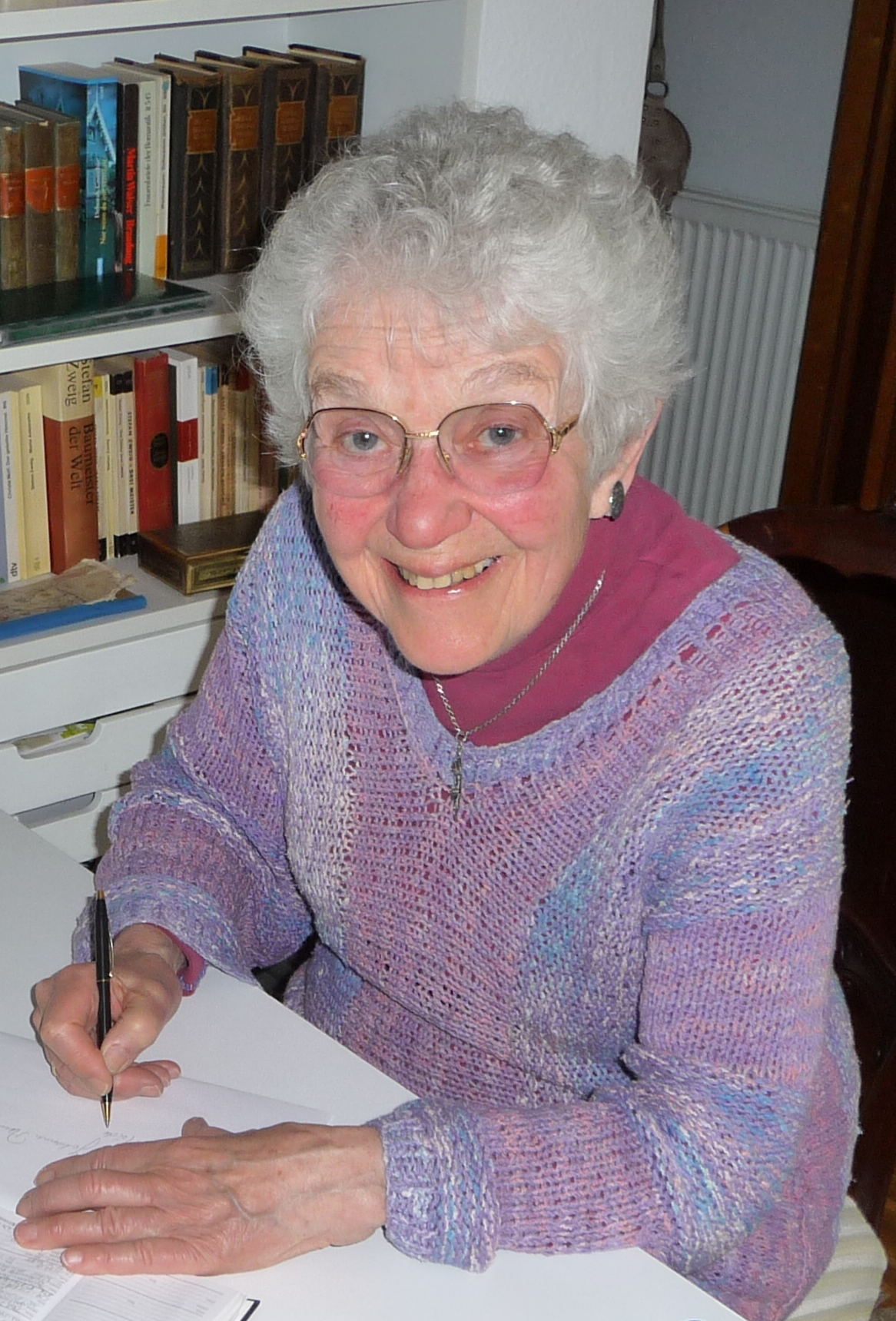
- Born: Hannelore Klein; August 3, 1927 (age 99); Frankfurt, Germany
- Education: University of Washington
- Occupations: Linguist and writer
- Known for: Scholar, Holocaust survivor, Anne Frank scholar
- Spouse: Rudi Nussbaum (m. 1947; died 2011)
- Children: 3

Laureen Nussbaum (born Hannelore Klein, August 3, 1927) is a German-born American scholar and writer. She is best known for being a Holocaust survivor, and as a scholar and childhood friend of the famed memoirist Anne Frank. Nussbaum is frequently consulted on Anne Frank works and literature.

Nussbaum was a professor of Foreign Languages and Literature at Portland State University. After retirement Nussbaum now lectures on the Holocaust, Anne Frank and her experience during World War II. While at Portland State, she also became the head of the German section of the Foreign Language Department. Nussbaum's publications on 20th-century German literature and literature written in Dutch by German refugees are often referenced in academia.

== Friendship with Anne Frank ==
Nussbaum was born Hannelore Klein in Frankfurt, Germany. As Germany became increasingly hostile toward Jews, Nussbaum's family moved from Frankfurt to Amsterdam in 1936. In her new neighborhood, Nussbaum met Anne Frank. Nussbaum's family and the Frank family had been friends in Frankfurt, though Nussbaum had not known the Frank children at that time. Nussbaum became closest to Anne's sister Margot. While growing up together, Nussbaum remembers Anne as "vivacious and smart", though the two were not particularly close. In fact, Nussbaum was "rather indifferent" about Anne, considering her a "noisy chatterbox" and "a shrimp".

After Anne and most of her family were killed, Nussbaum remained close to Otto Frank, Anne's father and the only surviving member of Anne's immediate family. Otto was the best man at Nussbaum's wedding to Rudi.

Nussbaum has written about the fact that Anne Frank rewrote a large part of her spontaneous diary entries with the intention to publish an epistolary novel based on her diary. While clear that "Otto should be congratulated for probably being the first to publish a document from the Holocaust," she has criticized him for combining Anne's two versions of her diary into one without explanation.

Of the memory that she keeps of Anne, Nussbaum stated in 1995 "Memory easily fools you and my memory is coloured, inevitably, by the fact that she has become so famous. I always found her lively and keen, but would never have thought she would turn into this icon. I am afraid the icon has become, for some people, a source of income and the person Anne is obscured by this. She stands as a symbolic figure upon whom the world can heap both its guilt and its commiseration."

== Holocaust ==
The Klein family moved to Amsterdam in 1936 to escape the increasing antisemitism in Germany. However, when the Nazis invaded the Netherlands in 1940, Jews were barred from many public places and in 1942 were forced to wear yellow stars on their clothing to denote their ethnicity. At the time of the invasion Nussbaum was twelve.

The Klein family was able to elude deportation because they were only part Jewish, claiming that Mrs. Klein was not Jewish at all. After that claim was accepted by the German authorities, only Nussbaum's father had to wear the yellow star on his clothing. The rest moved about society without issue. This is the subject of her book Shedding Our Stars: The Story of Hans Calmeyer and How He Saved Thousands of Families Like Mine published in 2019.

Nussbaum first met her future husband Rudi Nussbaum in Amsterdam, and acted as liaison for him while he was in hiding. Rudi hid for four years before the war ended, at first living with Dutch peasants, then in the countryside, and finally in the Klein home. The two married in 1947, two years after the war had ended. Of the experience Nussbaum stated "I would not have chosen, at the age of 13 or 14, a deep sense of obligation that someone was dependent upon you. But in all situations in life, you have to rise to the occasion. We decided the other person was decent and worth it."

== Life in America ==
In 1955, Nussbaum, along with her husband and children, spent a year in Indiana, where Rudi did post-doctoral research. Together Nussbaum and Rudi had three children; two sons and one daughter. Upon settling in California in 1957, Nussbaum changed her first name from Hannelore to Laureen.

In 1959, Rudi gained a position at Portland State University and the family moved to Portland, Oregon. While teaching part time at the same institution, Nussbaum acquired her Ph.D. and eventually a full time position in the Foreign Languages and Literature department, where she became Professor Emerita in 1989.

On July 22, 2011, Nussbaum's husband Rudi died after taking a fall in the Amsterdam Airport while the two were on holiday. After his funeral, he was cremated in Holland. The funeral was followed by a memorial service at the University Place Hotel and Conference Center in Portland.

== In literature ==
Nussbaum is published on a number of topics in multiple languages. Some key works include:

On Anne Frank

"Anne Frank," in Women Writing in Dutch.

"Anne Frank, The Writer," in Mit den Augen eindes Kindes: Children in the Holocaust: Children in Exile: Children under Fascism.

"Anne Frank: From Shared Experiences to a Posthumous Literary Bond," in Oregon English Journal.

"Anne's Diary Incomplete. How Important are the Five Withheld Pages?" In Anne Frank Magazine.

"Anne Frank," in Anne Frank: Reflections on Her Life and Legacy.

On Bertolt Brecht

The Image of Woman in the Work of Bertolt Brecht.

"The Evolution of the Feminine Principle in Brecht's Work: Beyond the Feminist Critique" in German Studies Review.

"The Evolution of the Feminine Principle in Brecht's Work: An Overview" in A Bertolt Brecht Reference Companion.

On Writings by Concentration Camp Survivors

"Drawing Conclusions from a Sojourn in Hades: The Work of Gerhard Durlacher, an Auschwitz Survivor" in The Bulletin of the Center for Holocaust Studies.

"Three Concentration Camp Accounts by Teenage Survivors: A Comparative Analysis," in Autobiographische Zeugnisse der Verfolgung.

"Anne Frank and Gerhard Durlacher, Two German-Dutch Writers: Parallels and Contrasts," in The Low Countries: Crossroads of Cultures.

On Georg Hermann

"Afterword," in Georg Hermann, Unvorhanden und stumm, doch zu Menschen noch reden. Briefe aus dem Exil an seine Tochter Hilde 1933-1941 (a volume she also edited).

"1926: Georg Hermann," in Yale Companion to Jewish Writing and Thought in German Culture 1096-1996.

"A Sampling of Georg Hermann's 'Letters about German Literature,' published in Het Algemeen Handelsbad 1921-1926," in Georg Hermann: Deutsch-Jüdischer Schriftseller und Journalist 1871-1943.

Other

"Witness Grete Weil: An Intensive Summer Graduate Seminar," in Shedding Light on the Darkness: A Guide to Teaching the Holocaust.

"Confrontations in the New World. Grete Weil's 'Happy,' sagte der Onkel (1968)" in The Sophie Journal.

"The German Documentary Theater of the Sixties: A Stereopsis of Contemporary History," in German Studies Review.

Nussbaum's work has also been referenced in dozens of books, such as:

- Anne Frank: The Biography by Melissa Müller
- Anne Frank Unbound: Media, Imagination, Memory by Barbara Kirshenblatt-Gimblett and Jeffrey Shandler
- Bertolt Brecht: Centenary Essays by Steve Giles and Rodney Livingstone
- Between Sorrow and Strength: Women Refugees of the Nazi Period by Sibylle Quack
- Constructing a Sociology of Translation by Michaela Wolf and Alexandra Fukari
- German-Jewish Literature in the Wake of the Holocaust: Grete Weil, Ruth Klüger, and the Politics of Address by Pascale R. Bos
- The Child's View of the Third Reich in German Literature : The Eye Among the Blind by Debbie Pinfold
- The Woman who Knew Too Much: Alice Stewart and the Secrets of Radiation by Gayle Greene
- Theaters of Justice: Judging, Staging, and Working Through in Arendt, Brecht, and Delbo by Yasco Horsman
- Winter Facets: Traces and Tropes of the Cold by Andrea Dortmann
- Women Without a Past?: German Autobiographical Writings and Fascism by Joanne Sayner

A 2019 memoir, “Shedding Our Stars: The Story of Hans Calmeyer and How He Saved Thousands of Families Like Mine,” written in collaboration with Karen Kirtley, focuses less on Nussbaum's relationship with Anne Frank, and more on Hans Calmeyer, the German official who saved the Klein family.
