= Charles Cline =

Charles Cline may refer to:

- Charles E. Cline (1858–1914), American politician in the state of Washington
- Charlie Cline (1931–2004), musician
- C. F. Cline (1939-2009), American politician in the state of Missouri
- Doug Cline (Charles Douglas Cline, 1938–1995), American football player

== See also ==
- Charles H. Kline (1870–1933), mayor of Pittsburgh
- Charles Klein (disambiguation)
