= Rod Benson =

American basketball player (born 1984)

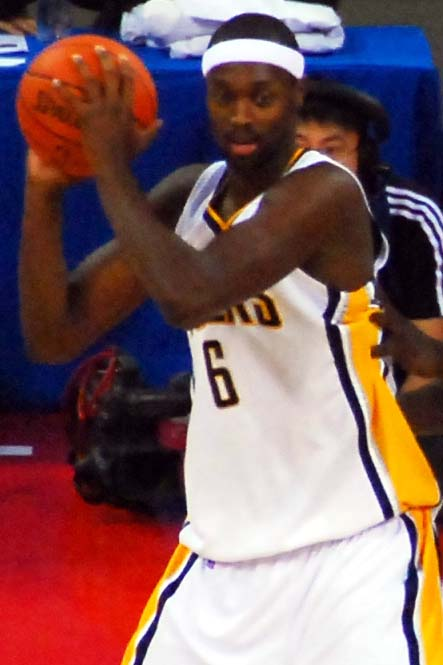
- Benson with the Indiana Pacers in 2009

Personal information
- Born: October 10, 1984 (age 42) Fairfield, California, U.S.
- Listed height: 6 ft 10 in (2.08 m)
- Listed weight: 235 lb (107 kg)

Career information
- High school: Torrey Pines (San Diego, California)
- College: California (2002–2006)
- NBA draft: 2006: undrafted
- Playing career: 2006–2018
- Position: Power forward / center

Career history
- 2006–2007: Austin Toros
- 2007–2008: Dakota Wizards
- 2008: SLUC Nancy
- 2008–2009: Dakota Wizards
- 2009–2010: Reno Bighorns
- 2010: Atléticos de San Germán
- 2010–2012: Wonju Dongbu Promy
- 2012–2013: Changwon LG Sakers
- 2013–2014: Ulsan Mobis Phoebus
- 2014–2015: Bank of Taiwan
- 2015: GlobalPort Batang Pier
- 2015: Indios de San Francisco
- 2015–2018: Wonju DB Promy

Career highlights
- Korean League Champion (2013, 2014); Korean League All-Star (2012–2014); Korean League Import Player of the Year (2012); NBA D-League All-Star (2007); All-NBA D-League Second Team (2008)

Rodrique Zsorryon Benson (born October 10, 1984) is an American former professional basketball player. He works as a blog writer and an artist.

== Career ==
=== High school ===
Benson attended Torrey Pines High School, and averaged 14 points, 8.5 rebounds and 3.8 blocks while leading the basketball team to a 25–4 record in his senior year. He was named first team all-league and second team All-CIF San Diego Section. He was rated the No. 3 center on the West Coast by a national recruiting evaulator. He also played three years of varsity volleyball, earning first team league honors in 2002.

=== College career ===
Benson graduated from the University of California, Berkeley, and majored in political science. After a huge improvement in his basketball from his sophomore to his junior year, Benson's senior year was marred by heel and knee injuries, which forced him to miss 11 games, impacting his future career heavily.

=== Professional career ===
In the summer of 2006, Benson played for the Sacramento Kings Summer League team. He was noticed by many NBA scouts, but was never offered a contract by any team.

When Benson left California, he started the 2006–2007 NBDL year with the Austin Toros. He had a game high of eight points on November 25, but averaged 2.4 points per game and was released by the team on January 3, 2007.

He was subsequently signed by the Dakota Wizards on January 9, 2007. In one of his first contests with the Wizards, he scored 17 points in 17 minutes. He ended the year with an average of 10.8 PPG. On March 17, 2007, he scored a personal high 27 points in a 126–100 win over the Arkansas Rimrockers. After training with the NBA's New Jersey Nets during the summer of 2007, Benson was re-signed by the Wizards for the 2007–2008 season and recorded averages of 13.6 points and a league best 12.1 rebounds per game.

On August 25, 2008, he was signed by defending French Pro-A league champion SLUC Nancy. He requested and was granted a release on December 12, 2008. Soon after, he signed a deal with the NBDL's Dakota Wizards, his former D-League team.

On March 4, 2009, he was traded to the Reno Bighorns for Jesse Smith.

Benson has played for the Utah Jazz in the Orlando Pro Summer League, and later for the Los Angeles Clippers in the NBA Summer League in 2010.

From 2010 to 2014 he played for three different teams in the Korean Basketball League, winning back-to-back championships in 2013 and 2014 with the Ulsan Mobis Phoebus. Towards the end of the 2013–2014 season the relationship with the team turned sour and he was cut shortly before the start of the new season under allegations of demanding more money, which Benson himself denied.

After three months of preparation in his home state of California, Benson was picked up by the team of Bank of Taiwan of the Taiwanese Super Basketball League in December 2014.

After having played just five games in the SBL, averaging 18 points and 11 rebounds, Benson signed a deal with GlobalPort Batang Pier of the Philippine Basketball Association (PBA) in early January 2015. The team chose him out of a group of four prospects as their import player in hopes of winning the PBA Commissioner's Cup, but Benson exceeded the team's 6'9" height limit and was replaced shortly after.

In early June 2015 Benson was signed by the Dominican National League's Indios de San Francisco de Macorís. In his first game after the short hiatus he scored 8 points, 9 rebounds and 2 assists in 25 minutes.

== Art ==
After retiring from basketball in 2018, Benson took up several hobbies, including painting fine art.

Badly shaken in July 2018, after experiencing police brutality in Las Vegas, Benson realized he could use painting to provide himself with a positive outlook.

He has his debut solo show entitled "Neon Black" in September 2018 and received critical acclaim for his efforts.

== Media coverage and blog ==
Benson writes a personal blog titled Too Much Rod Benson, as well as contributing to the Ball Don't Lie blog on Yahoo! Sports.

He wrote an autobiographical feature article that was published in SLAM Magazine in April 2008. He has also been featured in ESPN The Magazine, and was profiled on the ESPN television series E:60 by Bill Simmons in April 2008.

He is a columnist for SFGate.
