= Tony Cline =

American football player (1948–2018)

No. 84, 82
- Position: Defensive end

Personal information
- Born: July 25, 1948; Michigan City, Indiana, U.S.
- Died: July 23, 2018 (aged 69)
- Listed height: 6 ft 3 in (1.91 m)
- Listed weight: 244 lb (111 kg)

Career information
- High school: Michigan City (IN)
- College: Miami (FL)
- NFL draft: 1970: 4th round, 102nd overall pick

Career history
- Oakland Raiders (1970–1975); San Francisco 49ers (1976–1977)

Career NFL statistics
- Fumble recoveries: 3
- Interceptions: 3
- Stats at Pro Football Reference

Anthony Francis Cline (July 25, 1948 – July 23, 2018) was an American professional football defensive end who played in the National Football League (NFL) for the Oakland Raiders from 1970 to 1975 and the San Francisco 49ers from 1976 to 1977. He played college football at the University of Miami. Some researchers claim that he holds the American Football Conference (AFC) rookie sack record with 17½ in 1970, but the NFL has only recognized a sack as an official statistic since 1982, so Cline's record is not officially recognized. His son, Tony Cline Jr., also played in the NFL. His son-in-law, Jason Kapono played 9 seasons in the NBA.
