= David Clyne =

Scottish footballer

Personal information
- Full name: David Johnston Robertson Clyne
- Date of birth: 1 July 1916
- Place of birth: Dennistoun, Scotland
- Date of death: 12 May 1944 (aged 27)
- Place of death: Vatersay, Scotland
- Position: Right back

Senior career*
Years	Team	Apps	(Gls)
1937–1939	Queen's Park	5	(0)

International career
1938	Scotland Amateurs	2	(0)
- * Club domestic league appearances and goals

David Johnston Robertson Clyne (1 July 1916 – 12 May 1944) was a Scottish amateur footballer who played as a right back in the Scottish League for Queen's Park. He was capped by Scotland at amateur level.

== Personal life ==
Clyne served as a flight sergeant in the Royal Air Force Volunteer Reserve during the Second World War. On 12 May 1944, Clyne took off from RAF Oban with 9 aboard in a Catalina flying boat to conduct a training exercise. Over Vatersay, Clyne became disoriented and the plane crashed into Heisheaval Beag hill, killing himself and two passengers. He was buried in Riddrie Park Cemetery, Glasgow.
