= Victor Cline =

American sexologist

Victor B. Cline (1925–2013) was a University of California, Berkeley Ph D in Psychology, a research scientist with the George Washington University’s Human Resources Research Office, and an Emeritus Professor in Psychology at the University of Utah. His private clinical practice was in Salt Lake City, Utah.

== Career ==
Victor Cline was involved with multiple family-oriented organizations, such as Marriage and Family Enrichment (which he co-founded) and The Lighted Candle Society. Cline's research area was on sex addiction, especially topics pertaining to pornography. Cline was a clinical psychologist and psychotherapist specializing in marital and family counseling and the treatment of sexual compulsions and addictions. He also worked with the victims of sexual abuse and sexual assault. Cline was also a behavioral scientist with publications in the area of “media and pornography effects.” As a practitioner, he was involved in the treatment of sexual addicts or compulsives including many pedophiles and their victims.

Due to his studies on the effects of pornography, Cline has been utilized as an expert witness in court cases and by the US Judiciary Committee. Cline's opinion was requested by the Commission on Child Online Protection, which is associated with San Jose State University. Cline provided the following testimony:

"I find that the use of child pornography in time desensitizes the viewer to its pathology no matter how aberrant or disturbing. It becomes acceptable and preferred. The man always escalates to more deviant material, and the acting out continues and escalates despite very painful consequences such as destruction of the family, loss of spouse, children, job, health, or incarceration after committing criminal acts."

According to Cline, online pornography can plunge a person into the pornography cycle of addiction, escalation, desensitization, and acting out sexually. The cost of addiction includes "divorce, loss of family and problems with the law," and it escalates so that the addict requires more deviancy in order to get a "high" or "sexual turn-on."

Cline was a member of the Church of Jesus Christ of Latter-day Saints. He worked to help the church.

== Publications ==
- Cline, Victor B.; Croft, Roger G.; Courrier, Steven (Sep 1973). "Desensitization of children to television violence" (PDF). Journal of Personality and Social Psychology. 27 (3). American Psychological Association: 360–365. doi:10.1037/h0034945. PMID 4741676.
- Cline, Victor B.; Richards Jr., James M. (Jan 1960). "Accuracy of interpersonal perception: A general trait?". The Journal of Abnormal and Social Psychology. 60 (1). American Psychological Association: 1–7. doi:10.1037/h0041320. PMID 13810712.
- Victor B. Cline, ed. (1974). Where Do You Draw The Line? - An Exploration Into Media Violence, Pornography, And Censorship. United States: Brigham Young University Press. p. 376.
- Cline, Victor B. (Mar 1955). "Ability to judge personality assessed with a stress interview and sound-film technique". The Journal of Abnormal and Social Psychology. 50 (2). American Psychological Association: 183–187. doi:10.1037/h0047131. PMID 14366875.
- Cline, Victor B.; Richards Jr., James M.; Needham, Walter E. (Jun 1963). "Creativity tests and achievement in high school science". Journal of Applied Psychology. 47 (3). American Psychological Association: 184–189. doi:10.1037/h0041145.
- Cline, Victor B.; Tucker, Michael F.; Schmitt, James R. (Apr 1967). "Prediction Of Creativity And Other Performance Measures From Biographical Information Among Pharmaceutical Scientists". Journal of Applied Psychology. 51 (2). American Psychological Association: 131–138. doi:10.1037/h0024428. PMID 6039336.
- Cline, Victor B., Victor B.; Richards Jr., James M. (Jun 1965). "A factor-analytic study of religious belief and behavior". Journal of Personality and Social Psychology. 1 (6). American Psychological Association: 569–578. doi:10.1037/h0022083. PMID 14300232.
- Cline, VB (1994). "Pornography effects: Empirical and clinical evidence" In D. Zillmann, J. Bryant, & ACHuston (Eds.), Media, children and the family: Social scientific, psychodynamic and clinical perspectives pp. 229–247
- Cline, Victor B. (1976). "The Scientists vs. Pornography: An Untold Story". Intellect.
- Cline, Victor B. (April 1984). "Obscenity—How It Affects Us, How We Can Deal with It". Ensign.
- Cline, Victor B. (1976). "Changing Views and Status of Women: Implications within the Church and the Professions". Issues in Religion and Psychotherapy. 2 (1).
- Cline, Victor B. (1980). "How to Make Your Child a Winner"
- Cline, Victor B. (1987). "How to Make a Good Marriage Great: Ten Keys to a Joyous Relationship"
