= Augusta Klein =

British philosopher (1866–1943)

Augusta Klein (30 April 1866, in Steyning – 15 September 1943, in Oxford) was an English author and philosopher.

== Early life ==
She was the fourth daughter of businessman Wilhelm (William) Klein, who emigrated from Germany to London. Klein, together with her father and initially three sisters, which later became two, went on extended trips throughout Southern Europe, North Africa, the Middle East and India.

== Career ==
Augusta Klein studied Ancient Languages for four years at Cambridge. In 1882, she published in Blackwood's Magazine a report about her trip through Palestine. In 1895, her book about her trip to India, which lasted six months, was published in London under the title Among the Gods, Scenes of India, with Legends by the Way, that was available in multiple reprints. She then was the co-author with William Ralph Boyce Gibson of the book The Problem of Logic, published in London in 1908.

Between 1880 and 1910, she published on systematic philosophy in issues of Proceedings of the Aristotelian Society, The Monist, Philosophical Review, and The Journal of Philosophy. She remained unmarried and later assumed her mother's maiden name of Kirby.

== Her bibliography ==
- Among the Gods, Scenes of India, with Legends by the Way
- The Problem of Logic
