= Jürgen Klein =

German politician (born 1973)

Member of the Landtag of Rhineland-Palatinate
- In office 18 May 2016 – 18 Mai 2021

Personal details
- Born: 25 April 1973 (age 52) Bad Sobernheim
- Party: Alternative for Germany (since 2013)

Jürgen Klein (born 25 April 1973 in Bad Sobernheim) is a German politician. From 2016 to 2021, he was a member of the Landtag of Rhineland-Palatinate. He is the chairman of the Alternative for Germany in Bad Kreuznach.
