= Klein Modellbahn =

Klein Modellbahn was an Austrian model railway manufacturer.

The company was founded in 1984 in Vienna. It closed the production in 2008 and the sales in 2010.

Their product line consisted of mostly Austrian rolling stock and locomotives in H0 scale, covering both the pre–World War I Südbahn and the postwar ÖBB.
