= Alisa Morss Clyne =

American mechanobiologist

Academic background
- Education: BSc, Mechanical Engineering, 1996, Stanford University; MSc, Mechanical Engineering, 1999, University of Cincinnati; Ph.D., Medical and Mechanical Engineering, 2006, Harvard–MIT Program in Health Sciences and Technology
- Website: vascularkinetics.com

Alisa Morss Clyne is an American mechanobiologist. She is a Full Professor and Associate Chair of Diversity, Equity, and Inclusion in the Fischell Department of Bioengineering at the University of Maryland, College Park. Clyne is an expert in endothelial cell biology, biomechanics, and metabolomics.

== Early life and education ==
Clyne grew up in Illinois as her parents worked at Argonne National Laboratory. Spending time working with her father in his woodshop, she became drawn to construction and design.

Clyne completed her Bachelor of Science degree in Mechanical Engineering in 1996 from Stanford University, transitioning into aeronautics and working as an engineer for General Electric's Aircraft Engines Division, and completing her Master's degree at the University of Cincinnati in 1999. She then completed her PhD at the Harvard–MIT Program in Health Sciences and Technology in 2006. Upon enrolling in the Harvard-MIT program, she joined the lab of Elazer R. Edelman and studied the effect diabetes had on endothelial cells.

== Career ==
=== Drexel ===
Following her PhD, Clyne joined the faculty at Drexel University's Department of Bioengineering. Early into her tenure, she received the a National Science Foundation CAREER Award as a "junior faculty who exemplifies the role of teacher-scholars through outstanding research, excellent education, and the integration of education and research within the context of the mission of their organization." She was also recognized as a Rising Star in 2011 by the Biomedical Engineering Society (BMES). Clyne used her NSF Award to study the behavior of endothelial cells and which "sense the mechanics of their environment and respond to it." In 2012, Clyne received funding to co-develop an improved biomechanical engineering curriculum at Drexel. She was also promoted to the rank of associate professor with tenure. A few years later, received a National Institute of Health Research Project Grant for her project "The effect of laminar and disturbed flow on endothelial glucose metabolism." The aim of the project was to examine how the mechanical environment impacts the way vascular cells metabolize glucose.

=== University of Maryland, College Park ===
In 2019, Clyne became an associate professor at the University of Maryland, College Park's (UMD) A. James Clark School of Engineering with a courtesy appointment in the School of Biomedical Engineering, Science, and Health Systems, at Drexel. She also was inducted into the American Institute for Medical and Biological Engineering (AIMBE) College of Fellows in 2019. Upon joining the faculty, she moved her Vascular Kinetics Laboratory to UMD. Early into her tenure at UMD, she was elected a Fellow of the American Institute for Medical and Biological Engineering for "outstanding contributions to vascular mechanobiology and metabolism research, innovation in biomechanics education, and tireless advocacy for engineering diversity." In 2020, Clyne was named the Fischell Department of Bioengineering's inaugural Associate Chair for Diversity, Equity, and Inclusion. Shortly after stepping into this role, she was promoted to the rank of full professor and elected a Fellow of the BMES.
