= Elvira Clain-Stefanelli =

American numismatist

- Born: December 16, 1914; Bucharest, Romania
- Died: October 1, 2001 (aged 86); Arlington, Virginia, United States
- Years active: 1951–2001

Elvira Eliza Clain-Stefanelli (née Olinescu; December 16, 1914 – October 1, 2001) was a numismatist, director of the National Numismatic Collection of the Smithsonian Institution, and advisor to the United States Mint.

== Early life ==
Elvira Eliza Olinescu was born in Bucharest, Romania on December 16, 1914. She studied history at Franz Joseph University. She received a master's degree in history at the University of Cernauti.

In 1939, she married Vladimir Clain-Stefanelli (1914–1982), whom she met in Rome. The couple later moved to Berlin and were conducting research on coins in 1943 when they were sent to the Buchenwald concentration camp because Vladimir's passport had been stolen and used by an "enemy of the state."

== Career in the United States ==
Elvira and Vladimir emigrated to the United States in 1951. Elvira worked at Stack's Coin Galleries before joining the Smithsonian Institution in 1957, where Vladimir had been curator of the Division of Numismatics for one year. Over her several decades at the Smithsonian, she grew the National Numismatic Collection (NNC) from approximately 60,000 pieces in 1956 to over 960,000 pieces in 1982. She was appointed executive director of the NNC in 1983 and served in that role until her retirement in 2000.

In addition to her curatorial role at the Smithsonian, Clain-Stefanelli was an accomplished author, especially noted for her Numismatic Bibliography (1984), a work listing over 18,000 publications on all facets of numismatics.

In 1994, Clain-Stefanelli was appointed to the newly-formed Citizens Commemorative Coin Advisory Committee (the predecessor of the Citizens Coinage Advisory Committee), which was created by Congress to advise the Secretary of the Treasury on commemorative coin programs. She served on the committee until her death.

== Death ==
Clain-Stefanelli died on October 1, 2001, at a hospital in Arlington, Virginia.

== Elvira Clain-Stefanelli Memorial Award for Achievement in Numismatics ==
This award "was established and first given in 2013 to honor women who have made significant contributions to numismatics. These contributions, whether in research, leadership or mentorship, must have made a lasting impact on the numismatic community and demonstrated a lifelong commitment to the betterment of numismatics." Previous recipients of the award are:

- 2025 Kathryn S. Freeland
- 2024 Nancy Wilson
- 2023 Barbara J. Gregory
- 2022 Kay Edgerton Lenker
- 2021 Ellen Feingold
- 2020 Dorothy C. Baber
- 2019 Carrie Best
- 2018 Prue Morgan Fitts
- 2017 Charmy Harker
- 2016 Mary Counts Burleson
- 2015 Michele Orzano
- 2014 Diane Piret
- 2013 Elvira Clain-Stefanelli

== Publications ==
- The Beauty and Lore of Coins, Currency, and Medals (with Vladimir Clain-Stefanelli), Riverwood Publishers Ltd, 1974.
- Chartered for Progress : two Centuries of American Banking; a pictorial essay (with Vladimir Clain-Stefanelli), Acropolis Books, Ltd., 1975.
- Das Grosse Buch der Münzen und Medaillen (with Vladimir Clain-Stefanelli), Munich, Battenberg, 1976.
- Highlights from the Money Collection of the Chase Manhattan Bank, Washington, DC, Smithsonian Institution, 1979.
- "Italian Coin Engravers since 1800", Smithsonian Institution, Bulletin 229 (Contributions from the Museum of History and Technology, Paper 33), 1970.
- Life in Republican Rome on its Coinage, Washington, DC, Smithsonian Institution, 1999.
- Medals Commemorating Battles of the American Revolution (with Vladimir Clain-Stefanelli), Washington, DC, Smithsonian Institution, 1973.
- Monnaies européennes et monnaies coloniales américaines entre 1450 et 1789 (with Vladimir Clain-Stefanelli), Fribourg, Office du Livre, 1979.
- Numismatic Bibliography Munich, Battenberg, 1984.
- Select Numismatic Bibliography, Stack's, 1965.

== See also ==
- Vladimir and Elvira Clain-Stefanelli papers, 1938-1972 (at the American Numismatic Society)
- Elvira Clain-Stefanelli on WorldCat
