= Gloria Griffen Cline =

American historian (1929–1973)

- Born: March 21, 1929
- Died: April 2, 1973 (aged 44)
- Education: University of Nevada, University of California, Berkeley
- Occupations: Historian, Educator, Author

Gloria Griffen Cline (née Gloria Griffen; March 21, 1929 – April 2, 1973) was an American historian of the Great Basin and professor at Sacramento State College.

== Biography ==
She was born in San Francisco to parents Robert A. and Grace G. Griffen. In 1931 the Griffens moved to Reno, Nevada, where Gloria attended local grammar schools and Reno High School, graduating in 1947. She received her BA and MA in history from the University of Nevada in 1951, before going on to complete her Ph.D. in history at the University of California in 1958. She adapted her dissertation into the book Exploring the Great Basin (University of Oklahoma press).

After receiving her Ph.D., Cline taught at several universities, including the University of Nevada, Nevada Southern University (which became the University of Nevada, Las Vegas), and Indiana University. In 1960, she took a permanent position at Sacramento State College, where she was an assistant, then associate professor of history. Cline became the first woman to win Sacramento State College's Annual Faculty Research Award in 1965.

In 1966, she married John Harrison, and resigned her professorship to move to Bray, Ireland, with her husband. Cline's scholarship continued to focus on the settling of the Great Basin and the west. She contributed four biographies (Job Francis Dye, David Meriwether, Jacob P. Leese, and William Kittson) to LeRoy R. Hafen's ten-volume The Mountain Men and the Fur Trade of the Far West. She also worked extensively with the Hudson's Bay Company records, writing a biography of Peter Skene Ogden that was published posthumously in 1973 by the University of Oklahoma Press.

While living in Europe, Cline was lecturer at Cambridge University. She and her husband were in the process of moving permanently to the United States when Gloria died on April 2, 1973, as a result of a fall. After her death her parents gave an endowment to the University of Nevada, which named the reading room of the Special Collections Department in the Getchell Library Building after Gloria Griffen Cline. In 1974 after the death of her father, Robert A. Griffen, her mother donated the family's extensive collection of western Americana books and Native American artifacts to the Department, as well as this collection of Gloria Griffen Cline Papers.
