= Réka Klein =

German politician (born 1989)

Member of the Landtag of Saarland
- Incumbent
- Assumed office 25 April 2022

Personal details
- Born: 26 February 1989 (age 37)
- Party: Social Democratic Party (since 2021)

Réka Klein (born 26 February 1989) is a German politician serving as a member of the Landtag of Saarland since 2022. She has been a member of the Social Democratic Party since 2021.
