= Melissa S. Cline =

American biologist

Melissa Suzanne Cline is an American biologist. She is an Associate Research Scientist at the UC Santa Cruz Genomics Institute Between June 2001 and December 2004 she was a staff scientist at Affymetrix, Inc. in Emeryville, California where she was involved in developing ANOSVA, a "statistical method to identify alternative spicing from expression data," during which she "analyzed the effects of alternative splicing on protein transmembrane and signal peptide regions". Subsequently, she moved to UC Santa Cruz, where she wrote on genome browsing. According to the Thomson Reuters report, she was one of the most highly cited scientists in the world in 2012/13.

Cline is currently the program manager for the BRCA Exchange, a platform that shares knowledge on the tens of thousands of BRCA 1 and BRCA 2 genetic variants that could influence a person's susceptibility to breast cancer, particularly on the clinical significance of those variants. One of the challenge in curating the clinical impact of genetic variants is that is the curation often relies on clinical evidence of the variants in patients and their families; to protect patient privacy, most genetic data is siloed, or maintained in closed databases where the data are inaccessible to most researchers. Addressing this problem, Dr. Cline and colleagues devised a "federated analysis" approach to analyze patient data within its secure home repository, gathering new knowledge for variant curation while safeguarding patient privacy. This approach has successfully gathered new variant knowledge from siloed data, advancing the curation of BRCA variants.
