= Mobile ESPN =

Defunct American mobile virtual network operator

- Type: Division
- Industry: Wireless telecommunications
- Founded: November 25, 2005
- Founders: Walt Disney Company
- Defunct: December 31, 2006
- Headquarters: Bristol, Connecticut, United States
- Area served: United States
- Services: Mobile communications

Mobile ESPN was a mobile virtual network operator (MVNO) run by The Walt Disney Company using Sprint's EVDO wireless network from November 25, 2005, until December 2006. The service was widely considered overpriced and a failure, though in retrospect the actual data and audio-visual backbone and software behind the service would be re-adapted successfully for the smartphone age several years later, untied to a carrier.

== Application ==
Mobile ESPN's key feature was a sports application that could access news, highlights, and scores. The Java-based application was able to provide real-time scores, such that the phone was frequently five or more seconds ahead of a television broadcast in updating scores. The application was also integrated with a SMS service, so that the user was able to receive scoring alerts for favorite teams, and breaking news.

== Content ==
The content was managed by an editorial team that created original content and repurposed content from ESPN.com's web site to fit the phone format, thus most of the website's content would be on Mobile ESPN. On-air mentions of Mobile ESPN during programming such as SportsCenter, especially phone-in segments (which featured graphics of Mobile ESPN handsets rather than the common genericized renderings of mobile phones used by most news organizations), suggested that the network's on-air staff was contractually bound to use it.

On September 2, 2006, Mobile ESPN streamed the first live sporting event broadcast on a mobile device in the United States. Fans could watch live coverage from Ann Arbor as Michigan defeated Vanderbilt, 27–7.

== Handsets ==
Mobile ESPN had only one phone available at launch, the Sanyo MVP, that retailed for as much as US$399. By July 2006, the handset was available for free with a rebate and a two-year commitment to the service. In summer 2006, ESPN rolled out the Samsung ACE (SPH-A900), which resembled Motorola's RAZR phones and would ultimately replace the MVP.

Tom Shales and James Andrew Miller's book, Those Guys Have All the Fun: Inside the World of ESPN, notes that Apple CEO Steve Jobs (who held a large stake in Disney through his ownership of animation studio Pixar) reportedly told ESPN president George Bodenheimer, "Your phone is the dumbest fucking idea I have ever heard."

== Service plans ==
The lowest price plan offered at launch was a $34.95 plan that only included 100 minutes and no bonuses such as free nights and weekends. The lowest plan comparable to that offered by major carriers was a $64.95 plan which included 400 minutes of talk time and unlimited nights and weekends. In May 2006, new plans were rolled out at various price points, including a $40 monthly plan with 400 anytime minutes, free nights and weekends, and stripped-down data service. Though the cost of the full-service, 400 minute plan remained $64.95, the result was that users were allowed more freedom to pick and choose the services they wanted.

== Marketing ==
ESPN invested heavily in promotion of the service. ESPN bought its first Super Bowl ad for Super Bowl XL on February 5, 2006, a 60-second high-definition commercial called "ESPN Sports Heaven" that featured a fan walking through a city filled with sports stars. AdWeek estimated the production cost of the ad at $30 million, in addition to the estimated $2.5 million per 30 seconds cost for the broadcast advertising time during the game.

== Distribution ==
At first, ESPN Mobile phones were only available at retailers such as Best Buy. Later, service became available in Sprint stores in June 2006.

== Failure ==
Early results for Mobile ESPN were disappointing. Initially, ESPN was reported to have projected as many as 240,000 subscribers for the service, but the Wall Street Journal reported that Mobile ESPN had fewer than 10,000 subscribers. Merrill Lynch analysts considered Mobile ESPN to have "failed" and recommended that investors urge ESPN owner Disney to discontinue the service. It was estimated that Mobile ESPN and Disney Mobile (Its sister service) combined would lose $135 million over the 2006 fiscal year. ESPN had initially reaffirmed its commitment to the product, stating that they expected that price cuts in handsets, increased marketing efforts, and other incentives for customers would prove to be successful. However, on September 28, 2006, ESPN announced it would be discontinuing the service to take effect by the end of the year. Those who had subscribed to long-term plans received refunds from ESPN.

== Legacy ==
Though the MVNO service was overall a failure, the software, audio/video components, data stream and other APIs which were the backbone of the service were lauded and were easily re-adapted to fit the needs of what would become the smartphone. ESPN would launch their first iPhone app, then called ScoreCenter, on the App Store on June 12, 2008, its launch day. With ESPN's mobile backbone already built out, containing audio-visual content built for a much more capable mobile handset, it would prove to be much more successful. The app soon was also launched for Android and showed the network's investment in mobile communications would be worthwhile despite the previous setback of the MVNO attempt with sub-standard hardware.
