= Charles H. Klein =

American businessman and politician

Charles Henry Klein (June 2, 1872 – September 15, 1961) was an American businessman and politician.

Klein was born on a farm in Benton Township, Carver County, Minnesota. He went to the Carver County Lutheran parochial and public schools. Klein studied at the Curtis Business School in Saint Paul, Minnesota. He was involved in the brick manufacturing business and was a rural school teacher. In 1897, Klein moved with his wife and family to Chaska, Minnesota. He served on the Chaska School Board and was the president of the school board. He served in the Minnesota House of Representatives from 1903 to 1906 and in the Minnesota Senate from 1911 to 1914. Klein was a Republican.
