= Kline (surname) =

Kline is a surname. Notable people with the surname include the following:

- Adam W. Kline (1818–1898), New York politician
- Andrew Kline (b. 1976), American football player
- Boštjan Kline (b. 1991), Slovenian alpine ski racer
- Branden Kline (b. 1991), American baseball player
- Brittani Kline (b. 1991), American fashion model
- Carl Kline (psychiatrist) (1915–2005), Canadian psychiatrist and researcher
- Charles H. Kline (1870–1933), American politician, mayor of Pittsburgh, Pennsylvania
- Christopher Paul Kline (b. 1979), American musician known as "Vertexguy" or "the Vertex Guy"
- Franz Kline (1910–1962), American artist
- Jerry Kline (born 1951), American businessman
- John Kline (Harlem Globetrotter) (fl. 1950s), American professional basketball player
- John Kline (politician) (b. 1947), United States Representative from Minnesota
- Kevin Kline (b. 1947), American actor
- Lindsay Kline (1934–2015), Australian cricketer
- Mark Kline, American physician
- Meredith Kline (1922–2007), American theologian
- Morris Kline (1908–1992), American professor of mathematics and writer
- Otis Adelbert Kline (1891–1946), American adventure novelist
- Paul Kline (1937–1999), British academic psychologist
- Phill Kline (born 1959), American lawyer and politician from Kansas
- Richard Kline (b. 1944), American actor who played Larry on the sitcom Three's Company
- Scott Richard Kline (1967-2015), given name of Scott Weiland, American singer and founding member of the alt-rock group Stone Temple Pilots
- Sophie Kline (1902–1975), American politician
- Stanley F. Kline (1901–1942), United States Navy sailor and Silver Star recipient
- Virginia Harriett Kline (1910–1959), American geologist, stratigrapher, and librarian

== See also ==
- Clyne (surname)
- Klyne (surname)
