= Paul Clyne =

American lawyer

Albany County District Attorney
- In office January 1, 2001 – December 31, 2004
- Preceded by: Sol Greenberg
- Succeeded by: David Soares

Paul Clyne was the District Attorney of Albany County, New York from January 2001 through December 2004. A graduate of Albany Law School, he spent about 14 years as an assistant district attorney, before he was tapped by local politicians to replace the retiring District Attorney, Sol Greenberg. He was defeated for re-election by David Soares, first in the Democratic Party primary election in September 2004, and then in the general election in November 2004, in which he ran on an independent line. After a stint teaching at the New York Prosecutors Institute, he went into private practice as a criminal defense attorney in 2007, with an office in Albany, New York.

Clyne is married and has two children, Maddy and John. His brother, Matthew J. Clyne, is an election commissioner for Albany County.

In April 2008, Clyne said he was opposing his successor, David Soares, for re-election, and the Albany County Democratic candidate selection committee refused to endorse either candidate. He ended up not running after all; in November 2008, Soares won re-election, by a 73 to 27% margin against another candidate.

In April 2010, Clyne joined Council 82, a labor union for law enforcement officers, as a full-time staff attorney.

Legal offices
Preceded by Sol Greenberg	Albany County District Attorney; 2001 - 2004	Succeeded by David Soares
