= Clein =

Clein is a surname derived from Germanin Klein, often indicating Lithuanian Jewish descent. Notable people with the surname include:

- Louisa Clein (born 1979), English actress
- Natalie Clein (born 1977), English classical cellist
- Reubin Clein (1905–1989), American publisher
