= Tony Cline Jr. =

American football player (born 1971)

Tony Cline
No. 88, 86, 48, 84
- Position: Tight end

Personal information
- Born: November 24, 1971 (age 54); Davis, California, U.S.
- Listed height: 6 ft 4 in (1.93 m)
- Listed weight: 247 lb (112 kg)

Career information
- High school: Davis
- College: Stanford
- NFL draft: 1995: 4th round, 131st overall pick

Career history
- Buffalo Bills (1995–1997); Oakland Raiders (1998); San Francisco 49ers (1999); Pittsburgh Steelers (1999)

Awards and highlights
- Second-team All-Pac-10 (1994)

Career NFL statistics
- Receptions: 32
- Receiving yards: 255
- Touchdowns: 1
- Stats at Pro Football Reference

Anthony Francis Cline Jr. (born November 24, 1971) is an American former professional football player who was a tight end in the National Football League (NFL). He played high school football at Davis Senior High School and college football for the Stanford Cardinal. Cline was a member of the Phi Delta Theta fraternity and studied qualitative economics during his time at Stanford University.

Cline was selected by the Buffalo Bills with the 33rd pick in the fourth round of the 1995 NFL draft. He played in the National Football League (NFL) for the Bills from 1995 to 1997, Pittsburgh Steelers in 1999, and San Francisco 49ers in 1999. Cline retired following the 1999 season.

Cline's father, Tony Sr., was a defensive lineman for eight seasons in the NFL with the Oakland Raiders and San Francisco 49ers.
