= Clyne (surname) =

Clyne or Clynes is an Irish and Scottish surname. The Irish surname is derived from Kilcline, which is itself an Anglicized version of Mac Giolla Chlaoin (son of the deceitful lad). The Scottish surname is a toponym for people from various places named Clyne. Notable people with the surname include:

== Clyne ==
- Alan Clyne, (born 1986), Scottish squash player
- Alisa Morss Clyne, American mechano-biologist
- Anna Clyne (born 1980), British-born composer
- Cameron Clyne (born 1968), Australian businessman
- Daniel Clyne (1879–1965), Australian politician
- David Clyne (1916–1944), Scottish footballer
- Densey Clyne (1922–2019), Australian naturalist
- Graeme Clyne (1941–2024), Australian rules footballer
- Jeff Clyne (1937–2009), British jazz bassist
- John Clyne (1902–1989), Canadian lawyer
- Margot Clyne (born 1995), American cyclist
- Meghan Clyne, American writer
- Michael Clyne (1939–2010), Australian linguist
- Nathaniel Clyne (born 1991), English footballer
- Nicki Clyne (born 1983), Canadian actress
- Olivia Clyne (born 1993), American squash player
- Paul Clyne, District Attorney, Albany County, New York
- Peter Clyne (1927–1987), Australian lawyer and tax consultant
- Raymond Clyne McNichols (1914–1985), American judge
- Roger Clyne (born 1968), American rock singer. Also in Roger Clyne and the Peacemakers
- Ronald Clyne (1925–2006), American designer and graphic artist
- Sam Clyne (died 2015), Irish priest and academic leader
- Sam Hidalgo-Clyne (born 1993), Scottish rugby union player.

== Clynes ==
- Daniela Clynes, British vocalist, jazz and cabaret singer
- John Robert Clynes (1869–1949), also known as J. R. Clynes, British politician
- Manfred Clynes (1925–2020), Austrian/Australian scientist, inventor, and musician
- Michael Clynes (born 1946), pseudonym of Paul C. Doherty, British author, educator, lecturer and historian
- Nelly Clynes, or Nechama Ben-Or (born 1933), Polish Jewish concert pianist
