= Kleine =

Kleine is a German and Dutch surname meaning "small". Notable people with the surname include:

- Andrea Kleine (born 1970), American writer, choreographer, and performance artist
- Christian Kleine (born 1974), German musician and DJ
- Cindy Kleine (born c. 1962), American film director, producer and video artist
- George Kleine (1864–1931), American film producer and pioneer
- Hal Kleine (1923–1957), American baseball pitcher
- Joe Kleine (born 1962), American basketball player
- Lil' Kleine (born 1994), stage name of Jorik Scholten (born 1994), Dutch rapper
- Megan Kleine (born 1974), American swimmer
- Piet Kleine (born 1951), Dutch speed skater
- Robert Kleine (born 1941), American Michigan State Treasurer
- Theodor Kleine (1924–2014), German sprint canoer
- Thomas Kleine (born 1977), German football defender and manager
