= Dontonio Wingfield =

American basketball player (born 1974)

Personal information
- Born: June 23, 1974 (age 52) Albany, Georgia, U.S.
- Listed height: 6 ft 8 in (2.03 m)
- Listed weight: 256 lb (116 kg)

Career information
- High school: Westover (Albany, Georgia)
- College: Cincinnati (1993–1994)
- NBA draft: 1994: 2nd round, 37th overall pick
- Drafted by: Seattle SuperSonics
- Playing career: 1994–1998
- Position: Small forward / power forward
- Number: 34, 10

Career history
- 1994–1995: Seattle SuperSonics
- 1995–1998: Portland Trail Blazers
- 1998: León

Career highlights
- Great Midwest Newcomer of the Year (1994); Second-team All-Great Midwest (1994); McDonald's All-American (1993); First-team Parade All-American (1993); Second-team Parade All-American (1992); Mr. Georgia Basketball (1991)
- Stats at NBA.com
- Stats at Basketball Reference

Dontonio B. Wingfield (born June 23, 1974) is an American former professional basketball player, who played mainly in the power forward position. He played four seasons in the National Basketball Association (NBA) for the Seattle SuperSonics and Portland Trail Blazers. He played college basketball for the Cincinnati Bearcats.

== Early life ==
Born in Albany, Georgia, Wingfield was raised by a single mother. His mother Gloria worked evenings to support the family after Wingfield's parents separation when Dontonio was in the third grade. He grew up near the Willow Wood apartments on Albany's south side and played in the Henderson Community Center. Among the first to stand out in Willow Wood, Wingfield's older brother, Banastreus, played at Auburn-Montgomery.

A 6-foot-8 forward with a 3-point shot, Wingfield had a stellar high school career at Westover, where he led his team to 4 straight state championships, earning him McDonald's All American team honors in a class considered to be one of the best national high school classes ever; the class included Randy Livingston, Jerry Stackhouse, Rasheed Wallace, Rashard Griffith, Darnell Robinson and others. He started on the four state-championship teams, even as a freshman. Wingfield fathered three children while in high school.

== College and Professional career ==
Wingfield arrived at University of Cincinnati in 1993 as Bob Huggins’ best recruit to date, arriving there precisely after the departure of point guard Nick Van Exel. Wingfield had a solid freshman season with the Bearcats, he broke a first-game school record held by Oscar Robertson by scoring 30 points and 12 rebounds in his debut against Butler. He was named Great Midwest Conference newcomer of the year. Called “Baby Shaq” by those around the Bearcat program, Wingfield went on to average 16 points and 9 rebounds for the season, culminating in a 20-point 10-rebound effort in the NCAA Tournament opening round loss to Wisconsin. He hired an agent the day after the Bearcats' first-round loss in the NCAA tournament, the first college freshman in nearly twenty years to go pro.

Subsequently, he was selected by the Seattle SuperSonics in the second round (37th pick overall) of the 1994 NBA draft, but appeared sparingly throughout his short National Basketball Association career; after his debut with the Sonics (20 games, 81 minutes), he was selected by the Toronto Raptors in the 1995 expansion draft, but was waived before the season began.

From 1995 to 1998, Wingfield collected a further 94 regular season appearances, for the Portland Trail Blazers. On March 10, 1996, against the Indiana Pacers, he scored a career-high 17 points, adding seven rebounds and five assists (career-high tie) in a 113–108 win. His best month as a pro came in January 1997 (his third season) when he scored in double digits five times, including a 14-point 12-rebound 2-assist 2-block game at Boston on January 31.

In early 1998, Wingfield was cut by the Oregon franchise, finishing the season with Spain's Baloncesto León. In his NBA career, he played in 114 games and scored a total of 423 points. He lasted four years in the NBA, averaging 10 minutes, four points and two rebounds a game.

== Personal ==
The Blazersedge "Dontonio Wingcast" podcast is named after Wingfield. During college and afterwards, Wingfield encountered various personal and legal troubles, including being convicted for assaulting two suburban Cincinnati police officers. He later sustained severe injuries in an automobile accident. Heading to Washington for a workout with the Wizards the very next day, Wingfield was driving on a wet road near Albany in November 1998 when he skidded to avoid a deer. He broke both ankles and five bones in his back due to the car being flipped and tumbled. Wingfield spent three months in the hospital and then a year to progress from cane to walker, limping under his own power again.

Wingfield has a prosthesis on his left leg, which was amputated below the knee in 2010 due to complications of diabetes. He wrote a book called “Chasing Success, Finding Purpose," which is available on Amazon.

After recovering from the auto accident, Wingfield got his culinary arts degree from Cincinnati and returned to Albany, where he began working with youth organizations, such as coaching an AAU basketball team, the Albany Hawks. Most recently, Wingfield has been active in an organization called Save Our Sons (SOS). That program focuses on providing alternatives to gangs and crime for young Albany males.

Wingfield has nine children and says he's a part of all of their lives. The two eldest, Ashley and Bre, grew up in Albany. Three were raised in Cincinnati – DJ was a three-time All-Ohio high school basketball player played basketball at Ohio University., Donovan Wingfield who studied music and was a volleyball player at Tuskegee University; and Autumn ‘’Butterfly’’ Mason whom Wingfield didn't meet until 2009, when she was thirteen. Another daughter London grew up in Texas and California and Wingfield met her when she was seven. Wingfield began coaching son Dequan at age 9 in 2004. In 2008, daughter Jay began playing. Wingfield coached their AAU teams, and that brought him to Henderson Gym, where he began his youth program. Wingfield's youngest child, Donjuwan, a student at Douglass High in Atlanta, has stayed with Wingfield in the summers since age 7 and has participated in Wingfield's camps.
