= 1993 McDonald's All-American Boys Game =

American high school basketball game

East	West
105	95
	1st half	2nd half	Total
East	50	55	105
West	47	48	95
- Date: April 2, 1993
- Venue: Mid-South Coliseum, Memphis, TN
- MVP: Jacque Vaughn and Jerry Stackhouse
- Referees: 1; 2; 3
- Attendance: 10,225
- Network: CBS

McDonald's All-American

The 1993 McDonald's All-American Boys Game was an all-star basketball game played on Friday, April 2, 1993 at the Mid-South Coliseum in Memphis, Tennessee. The game's rosters featured the best and most highly recruited high school boys graduating in 1993. The game was the 16th annual version of the McDonald's All-American Game first played in 1978.

== 1993 game ==
The game was telecast live by CBS. Rashard Griffith was selected as a McDonald's All-American but did not play in the game because of the NCAA limit of 2 all-star games: having already played in the Roundball Classic and the Illinois-US All-Stars game, he was unable to participate in the McDonald's event. The Mid-South Coliseum was sold out for the event: the top prospects of the teams were big men Rasheed Wallace and Darnell Robinson. The MVP title was awarded to two players, Jacque Vaughn for the West team and Jerry Stackhouse for the East. Vaughn was noted for his pass-first style of play and broke the assist record with 13 (the record still stands as of 2018); on the other hand, Stackhouse showed his finishing ability and scored 27 points, becoming the game's top scorer. Other players who starred were Robinson (19 points and 10 rebounds), Charles O'Bannon (19 points), Jerald Honeycutt (14), Keith Booth (15) and Dontonio Wingfield, who also recorded a double-double with 13 points and 13 rebounds. Rasheed Wallace fouled out after scoring 9 points. Of the 22 players, 10 went on to play at least one game in the NBA.

=== East roster ===
No.	Name	Height	Weight	Position	Hometown	High school	College of Choice
3	Jeff McInnis	6-4	190	G	Mouth of Wilson, VA, U.S.	Oak Hill Academy	North Carolina
12	Dontonio Wingfield	6-9	250	F	Albany, GA, U.S.	Westover	Cincinnati
20	Ronnie Henderson	6-4	195	G	Jackson, MS, U.S.	Murrah	LSU
23	Damon Flint	6-6	191	G	Cincinnati, OH, U.S.	Woodward	Ohio State
25	Jason Osborne	6-8	200	F	Louisville, KY, U.S.	Male	Louisville
30	Keith Booth	6-5	210	F	Baltimore, MD, U.S.	Dunbar	Undecided; Committed later to Maryland.
33	Rasheed Wallace	6-11	225	C	Philadelphia, PA, U.S.	Simon Gratz	Undecided; Committed later to North Carolina.
41	Jerry Stackhouse	6-7	215	G	Mouth of Wilson, VA, U.S.	Oak Hill Academy	North Carolina
42	Joey Beard	6-10	225	C	Reston, VA, U.S.	South Lakes	Duke
50	Randy Livingston	6-4	195	G	New Orleans, LA, U.S.	Isidore Newman	LSU

=== West roster ===
No.	Name	Height	Weight	Position	Hometown	High school	College of Choice
00	Avondre Jones	6-10	225	C	Lakewood, CA, U.S.	Artesia	Undecided; Committed later to USC.
4	Jerald Honeycutt	6-9	245	F	Grambling, LA, U.S.	Grambling Laboratory	Undecided; Committed later to Tulane.
11	Jacque Vaughn	6-0	190	G	Pasadena, CA, U.S.	John Muir	Kansas
12	Chris Kingsbury	6-5	215	G	Hamilton, OH, U.S.	Hamilton	Iowa
15	Sylvester Ford, Jr.	6-6	210	G	Memphis, TN, U.S.	Fairley	Undecided; Committed later to Memphis.
30	Charles O'Bannon	6-6	205	G	Lakewood, CA, U.S.	Artesia	UCLA
31	Bobby Crawford	6-3	185	G	Houston, TX, U.S.	Eisenhower	Michigan
42	Sherron Wilkerson	6-4	185	G	Jeffersonville, IN, U.S.	Jeffersonville	Indiana
44	Darnell Robinson	6-11	270	C	Emeryville, CA, U.S.	Emery	Arkansas
45	Cedric Henderson	6-7	205	F	Memphis, TN, U.S.	East	Memphis
54	Jon Garavaglia	6-8	220	F	Southgate, MI, U.S.	Aquinas	Michigan State
N/A	Rashard Griffith	7-0	265	C	Chicago, IL, U.S.	Martin Luther King	Wisconsin

=== Coaches ===
The East team was coached by:

- Julius Prezelski of Forest City High School (Forest City, Pennsylvania)

The West team was coached by:

- Charles Ripley of Parkview High School (Little Rock, Arkansas)

== All-American Week ==
=== Schedule ===
- Thursday, April 1: Coca-Cola JamFest
  - Slam dunk contest
  - Three-point shoot-out
- Friday, April 2: 16th Annual Boys All-American Game

The Coca-Cola JamFest is a skills-competition evening featuring basketball players who demonstrate their skills in two crowd-entertaining ways. The slam dunk contest was first held in 1987, and a three-point shooting challenge was added in 1989.

=== Contest winners ===
- The 1993 Slam dunk contest was won by Jerry Stackhouse.
- The 1993 three-point shoot-out was won by Chris Kingsbury.
