= Jacque Vaughn =

American basketball player and coach (born 1975)

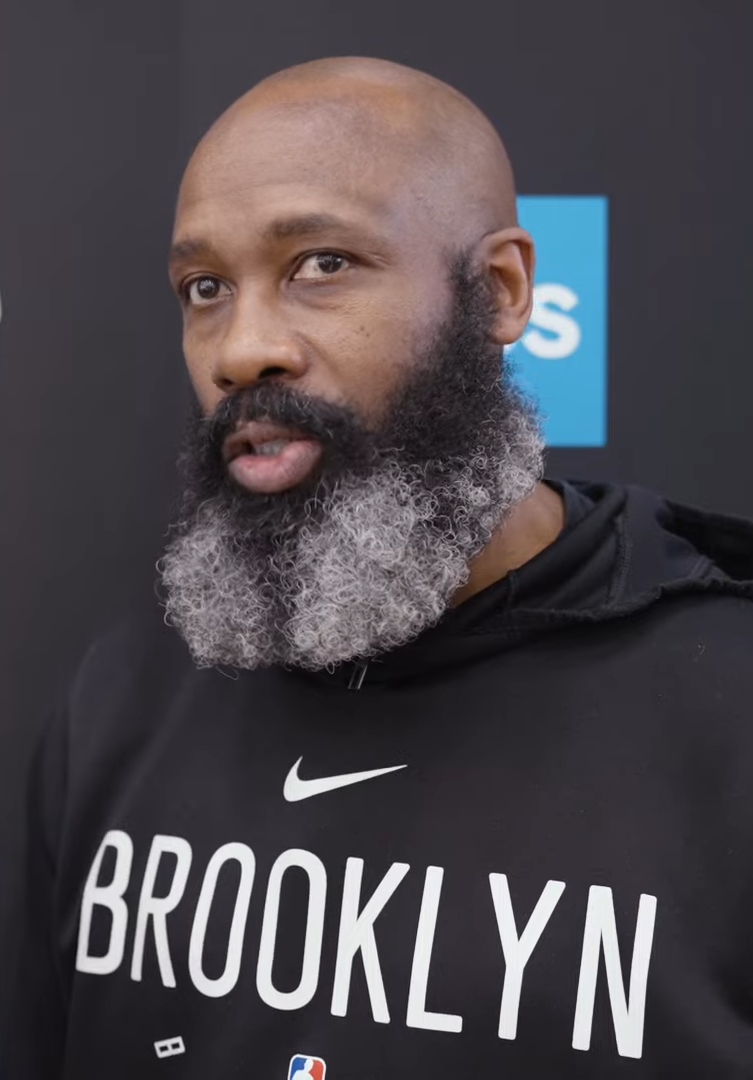
- Vaughn in 2024

Kansas Jayhawks
- Title: Assistant coach
- League: Big 12 Conference

Personal information
- Born: February 11, 1975 (age 51) Los Angeles, California, U.S.
- Listed height: 6 ft 1 in (1.85 m)
- Listed weight: 190 lb (86 kg)

Career information
- High school: John Muir (Pasadena, California)
- College: Kansas (1993–1997)
- NBA draft: 1997: 1st round, 27th overall pick
- Drafted by: Utah Jazz
- Playing career: 1997–2009
- Position: Point guard
- Number: 11
- Coaching career: 2010–present

Career history

Playing
- 1997–2001: Utah Jazz
- 2001–2002: Atlanta Hawks
- 2002–2003: Orlando Magic
- 2003–2004: Atlanta Hawks
- 2004–2006: New Jersey Nets
- 2006–2009: San Antonio Spurs

Coaching
- 2010–2012: San Antonio Spurs (assistant)
- 2012–2015: Orlando Magic
- 2016–2022: Brooklyn Nets (assistant)
- 2020: Brooklyn Nets (interim)
- 2022–2024: Brooklyn Nets
- 2025–present: Kansas (assistant)

Career highlights
- NBA champion (2007); 2× Consensus second-team All-American (1996, 1997); Big Eight Player of the Year (1996); First-team All-Big 12 (1997); 2× First-team All-Big Eight (1995, 1996); No. 11 retired by Kansas Jayhawks; McDonald's All-American Co-MVP (1993); First-team Parade All-American (1993); Second-team Parade All-American (1992)

Career NBA statistics
- Points: 3,463 (4.5 ppg)
- Rebounds: 1,028 (1.3 rpg)
- Assists: 1,919 (2.5 apg)
- Stats at NBA.com
- Stats at Basketball Reference

Jacque Trevan Vaughn (born February 11, 1975) is an American professional basketball coach and former player who is an assistant coach for the Kansas Jayhawks of the Big 12 Conference. Vaughn played in the National Basketball Association (NBA) for the Utah Jazz, Atlanta Hawks, Orlando Magic, New Jersey Nets, and San Antonio Spurs from 1997 to 2009.

== Playing career ==
=== High school ===
A native of Altadena, California, Vaughn attended John Muir High School in nearby Pasadena, where he maintained a 3.94 GPA, and became the best high school player in that area since former Muir and NBA standout Stacey Augmon. Vaughn excelled both on and off the court, and by his senior year was ranked as high as the no. 7 high school recruit in the country and the no. 2 point guard in the class of 1993 behind arguably the nation's top player that year, Randy Livingston. Over the course of the season, Vaughn averaged over 21 points and 19 assists per game, while also compiling six triple-doubles. Named a First-Team All-American by nearly every publication on the market, Vaughn rounded off his special season with a selection to participate in the prestigious McDonald's All-American Game where he put on a show, scoring only 6 points but amassing 13 assists (still a McDonald's record), while also thoroughly outplaying the higher-ranked Livingston once again—this time on a national stage (they had both matched up against each other in the All-Star Game of the 1992 Nike Camp), and was named co-MVP with North Carolina's Jerry Stackhouse in the process. After considering Georgetown, Indiana, UNLV, Arizona and UCLA, Vaughn decided to play for coach Roy Williams at Kansas, continuing, along with fellow recruit and college roommate Scot Pollard, the California pipeline of high school hoopsters to Lawrence, Kansas, started by former standouts Adonis Jordan and Rex Walters, and continuing in later years with Paul Pierce and Eric Chenowith.

As a senior in high school in 1992, Vaughn was awarded the Dial Award as the nation's top male high school scholar-athlete, becoming the first basketball player ever to win that award.

=== College ===
In his college career Vaughn became the starting point guard as a freshman after being chosen to replace incumbent starter Calvin Rayford. Among his first-year highlights were earning the MVP award at the 1993 Pre-Season NIT at Madison Square Garden in New York City and hitting a game-winning three pointer at the overtime buzzer to beat Indiana in an early season game at Allen Fieldhouse. Throughout his four years at Kansas, Vaughn was known as a good distributor of the basketball and effective defender with great speed and court awareness. By the end of his college career, he was the all-time leader in assists in Kansas basketball history with 804 total (since surpassed by Aaron Miles), as well as the Big Eight Conference's all-time record holder. In 1995, Vaughn was named Arthur Ashe Jr. Sports Scholar by Diverse: Issues In Higher Education. Additionally in 1997, the award given annually to the school's assist leader was renamed to include Vaughn, Miles and original assists leader, Cedric Hunter, as the Hunter/Vaughn/Miles Assists Award.

Vaughn earned a 3.72 GPA as a business administration major. He was a two-time Academic All-American at Kansas and the 1997 GTE Academic All-American of the Year. He was also a two-time all-conference pick and was named the Big Eight Player of the Year in 1996. His college jersey was retired on December 31, 2002, and hangs in the rafters of Allen Fieldhouse.

=== Professional ===
In 1997, Vaughn was selected 27th overall by the Utah Jazz in the 1997 NBA draft. In addition to playing four seasons in Utah, Vaughn also played with the Orlando Magic, the Atlanta Hawks (in two separate stints), New Jersey Nets, and San Antonio Spurs. He appeared in 64 games for the NBA champion San Antonio Spurs during the 2006–07 season and finished his career there, retiring after the 2008–09 season. Over his career, he averaged 4.5 points per game and 2.5 assists per game. He also set an NBA record for consecutive missed field goal attempts to open a season, missing his first 22 to start the 2001 season with the Atlanta Hawks. After those 22 straight misses he shot a career best 47 percent that season.

== NBA career statistics ==
Legend
GP	Games played	GS	Games started	MPG	Minutes per game
FG%	Field goal percentage	3P%	3-point field goal percentage	FT%	Free throw percentage
RPG	Rebounds per game	APG	Assists per game	SPG	Steals per game
BPG	Blocks per game	PPG	Points per game	**Bold**	Career high
†	Won an NBA championship

=== Regular season ===
Year	Team	GP	GS	MPG	FG%	3P%	FT%	RPG	APG	SPG	BPG	PPG
1997–98	Utah	45	0	9.3	.361	.375	.706	.8	1.9	.2	.0	3.1
1998–99	Utah	19	0	4.6	.367	.250	.833	.6	.6	.3	.0	2.3
1999–00	Utah	78	0	11.3	.416	.412	.750	.8	1.6	.4	.0	3.7
2000–01	Utah	**82**	0	19.8	.433	.385	.780	1.8	3.9	.6	.0	6.1
2001–02	Atlanta	**82**	16	**22.6**	**.470**	.444	.825	**2.0**	**4.3**	**.8**	.0	**6.6**
2002–03	Orlando	80	**48**	21.1	.448	.235	.776	1.5	2.9	**.8**	.0	5.9
2003–04	Atlanta	71	6	17.9	.386	.150	.779	1.6	2.7	.6	.0	3.8
2004–05	New Jersey	71	34	19.9	.449	.333	.835	1.5	1.9	.6	.0	5.3
2005–06	New Jersey	80	6	15.4	.437	.167	.728	1.1	1.5	.5	.0	3.4
2006–07†	San Antonio	64	4	11.9	.425	.500	.754	1.1	2.0	.4	.0	3.0
2007–08	San Antonio	74	9	15.4	.428	.300	.763	1.0	2.1	.3	.0	4.1
2008–09	San Antonio	30	0	9.7	.320	**1.000**	**.889**	.7	1.8	.2	.0	2.2
Career		776	123	16.3	.429	.352	.779	1.3	2.5	.5	.0	4.5

=== Playoffs ===
Year	Team	GP	GS	MPG	FG%	3P%	FT%	RPG	APG	SPG	BPG	PPG
1998	Utah	7	0	3.4	.200	.500	**1.000**	.4	.6	.0	.0	1.0
1999	Utah	2	0	3.0	**.500**	**1.000**	—	.0	1.0	.0	.0	1.5
2000	Utah	7	0	9.6	.357	.500	.875	**1.7**	1.6	**.6**	.1	4.0
2001	Utah	5	0	11.4	.100	.500	—	.4	1.6	.0	**.2**	.6
2003	Orlando	7	**6**	**18.7**	.364	.000	.769	.9	**3.6**	**.6**	.1	**4.9**
2006	New Jersey	11	0	14.5	.364	.000	.571	1.0	1.1	.2	.0	2.5
2007†	San Antonio	**20**	0	10.4	.400	—	.500	.5	1.4	.2	.0	2.2
2008	San Antonio	14	0	6.5	.273	.000	—	.6	.6	.1	.0	.9
2009	San Antonio	2	0	10.5	.400	—	.500	.0	2.0	.5	.0	3.5
Career		75	6	10.2	.342	.400	.690	.7	1.4	.2	.0	2.2

== Coaching career ==
Vaughn was an assistant coach with the San Antonio Spurs from 2010 to 2012. On July 28, 2012, Vaughn was named the new head coach of the Orlando Magic. On February 5, 2015, he was fired by the Magic. Vaughn then spent the 2015–16 season working as a professional scout for the Spurs. He was hired as Kenny Atkinson's top assistant coach for the Brooklyn Nets prior to the 2016–17 season, and was promoted to interim head coach position in March 2020 following Atkinson's mid-season departure. On September 3, 2020, the Nets hired Steve Nash as head coach, while Vaughn returned to his position as assistant coach.

On November 1, 2022, Vaughn was named interim head coach after the Nets and Steve Nash parted ways, and on November 9, he was announced as permanent Nets head coach. On February 21, 2023, the Nets signed Vaughn to a contract extension. On February 19, 2024, the Nets fired Vaughn after the team started the season with a 21–33 record and were out of playoff contention at the time of this firing.

On May 21, 2025, Vaughn was named assistant coach at his alma mater, the University of Kansas

== Head coaching record ==
Legend
Regular season	G	Games coached	W	Games won	L	Games lost	W–L %	Win–loss %
Playoffs	PG	Playoff games	PW	Playoff wins	PL	Playoff losses	PW–L %	Playoff win–loss %

Team	Year	G	W	L	W–L%	Finish	PG	PW	PL	PW–L%	Result
Orlando	2012–13	82	20	62	.244	5th in Southeast	—	—	—	—	Missed playoffs
Orlando	2013–14	82	23	59	.280	5th in Southeast	—	—	—	—	Missed playoffs
Orlando	2014–15	52	15	37	.288	(fired)	—	—	—	—	—
Brooklyn	2019–20	10	7	3	.700	4th in Atlantic	4	0	4	.000	Lost in First Round
Brooklyn	2022–23	75	43	32	.573	4th in Atlantic	4	0	4	.000	Lost in First Round
Brooklyn	2023–24	54	21	33	.389	(fired)	—	—	—	—	—
Career		355	129	226	.363		8	0	8	.000	

== Personal life ==
Vaughn and his wife were married in 2003. The couple have two sons. He enjoys reading and writing poetry.
