= Vyron Brown =

American football coach (born c. 1979)

Current position
- Title: Offensive coordinator
- Team: Lincoln Prep HS (LA)

Biographical details
- Born: c. 1979 (age 46–47); Shreveport, Louisiana, U.S.
- Education: Grambling State University (2001, 2003)

Playing career
- 1997–2000: Grambling State
- Position: Running back

Coaching career (HC unless noted)
- 2001: Carroll HS (LA) (OC)
- 2002: Grambling State (GA)
- 2003–2006: Grambling State (RB)
- 2007: Southern Lab HS (LA) (interim HC/OC)
- 2008: Shaw (OC/RB)
- 2009–2010: Alabama State (RB)
- 2011 (spring): Alcorn State (OC)
- 2011–2013: Grambling State (OC)
- 2014–2015: Texas Southern (assoc. HC/OC/WR)
- 2016–2018: Lincoln Prep HS (LA) (OC)
- 2019: Lane (OC/RB)
- 2020–2024: Lane
- 2025–present: Lincoln Prep HS (LA) (OC)

Head coaching record
- Overall: 17–23 (college); 4–7 (high school)

Vyron Brown (born c. 1979) is an American college football coach. He is the offensive coordinator for Lincoln Preparatory School, a position he has since 2025. He was the head football coach for Carroll High School in 2007 and Lane College from 2020 to 2024. He also coached for Grambling State, Shaw, Alabama State, Alcorn State, Texas Southern, and Lincoln Preparatory School.

Brown was a member of the last recruiting class of the legendary Eddie Robinson at Grambling State University. He then played for Grambling coach Doug Williams after Robinson's retirement. Brown played for Grambling from 1997 to 2000 and was a two-time captain.

== Head coaching record ==
=== College ===
Year	Team	Overall	Conference	Standing	Bowl/playoffs
Lane Dragons (Southern Intercollegiate Athletic Conference) (2020–2024)
2020–21	No team—COVID-19				
2021	Lane	6–4	3–3	3rd (West)	
2022	Lane	5–5	4–2	2nd (West)	
2023	Lane	2–8	2–6	T–9th	
2024	Lane	4–6	3–5	T–9th	
Lane:		17–23	12–16		
Total:		17–23			

=== High school ===
Year	Team	Overall	Conference	Standing	Bowl/playoffs
Southern Lab Kittens () (2007)
2007	Southern Lab	4–7	3–2	3rd	
Southern Lab:		4–7	3–2		
Total:		4–7			
