= Jerald Honeycutt =

American basketball player (born 1974)

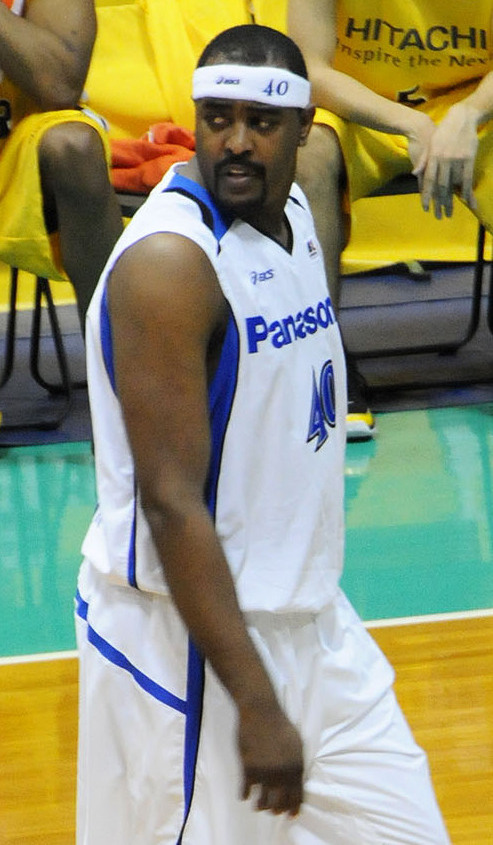

Personal information
- Born: October 20, 1974 (age 52) Shreveport, Louisiana, U.S.
- Listed height: 6 ft 9 in (2.06 m)
- Listed weight: 254 lb (115 kg)

Career information
- High school: Grambling (Grambling, Louisiana)
- College: Tulane (1993–1997)
- NBA draft: 1997: 2nd round, 38th overall pick
- Drafted by: Milwaukee Bucks
- Playing career: 1997–2013
- Position: Power forward
- Number: 25

Career history
- 1997–1999: Milwaukee Bucks
- 1999: Philadelphia 76ers
- 1999–2000: Idaho Stampede
- 2001: Barangay Ginebra Kings
- 2002: Talk 'N Text Phone Pals
- 2002–2003: Grand Rapids Hoops
- 2003–2004: Idaho Stampede
- 2005: Talk 'N Text Phone Pals

Career highlights
- All-CBA First-Team (2003); Third-team All-American – NABC (1997); 2× First-team All-Conference USA (1996, 1997); First-team All-Metro Conference (1995); Second-team All-Metro Conference (1994); McDonald's All-American (1993); Third-team Parade All-American (1993); Fourth-team Parade All-American (1992)
- Stats at NBA.com
- Stats at Basketball Reference

Jerald DeWayne Honeycutt (born October 20, 1974) is an American former professional basketball player.

Honeycutt played high school basketball at Grambling Lab in Grambling, Louisiana. He played collegiately at Tulane University, where he finished his career as the leading scorer and fifth leading rebounder in school history. He was inducted into the Louisiana Basketball Hall of Fame in 2006. He was selected by the Milwaukee Bucks in the 2nd round (38th overall) of the 1997 NBA draft. Honeycutt played two years in the NBA for the Bucks and the Philadelphia 76ers, averaging 5.1 ppg in his career.

Honeycutt played for the CBA's Idaho Stampede and Grand Rapids Hoops. He earned All-CBA First Team honors with the Hoops in 2003. He also played internationally in the Philippines, Greece, Russia, Lebanon, Japan, and elsewhere. Honeycutt last played for the Toyota Tsusho Fighting Eagles of the Japan Basketball League. He has also played for the Panasonic Trians, the Mitsubishi Diamond Dolphins and the Hamamatsu Higashimikawa Phoenix.

== NBA career statistics ==
Legend
GP	Games played	GS	Games started	MPG	Minutes per game
FG%	Field goal percentage	3P%	3-point field goal percentage	FT%	Free throw percentage
RPG	Rebounds per game	APG	Assists per game	SPG	Steals per game
BPG	Blocks per game	PPG	Points per game	**Bold**	Career high

=== Regular season ===
Year	Team	GP	GS	MPG	FG%	3P%	FT%	RPG	APG	SPG	BPG	PPG
1997–98	Milwaukee	**38**	0	**13.9**	**.407**	**.377**	.621	**2.4**	**0.9**	**0.5**	**0.2**	**6.4**
1998–99	Milwaukee	3	0	4.0	.400	.000	.500	0.3	0.0	0.3	0.0	1.7
1998–99	Philadelphia	13	0	6.9	.259	.357	**.750**	0.8	0.2	0.3	**0.2**	1.9
Career		54	0	11.7	.391	.362	.632	1.9	0.7	0.5	0.1	5.1

=== Playoffs ===
Year	Team	GP	GS	MPG	FG%	3P%	FT%	RPG	APG	SPG	BPG	PPG
1998–99	Philadelphia	6	0	2.0	.200	.000	.000	0.2	0.0	0.0	0.0	0.3
