= Rasheed Brokenborough =

American basketball player (born 1977)

Personal information
- Born: June 24, 1976 (age 50) Philadelphia, Pennsylvania
- Listed height: 6 ft 3 in (1.91 m)
- Listed weight: 200 lb (91 kg)

Career information
- High school: University City (Philadelphia, Pennsylvania)
- College: Temple (1996–1999)
- NBA draft: 1999: undrafted
- Playing career: 1999–2011
- Position: Shooting guard

Career history
- 2000–2001: South Dakota Gold
- 2001–2004: Kapfenberg Bulls
- 2004: Lleida
- 2004–2005: Cocodrilos de Caracas
- 2005–2006: Ventspils
- 2006–2007: Tofaş
- 2007–2008: Scavolini Pesaro
- 2008–2009: APOEL
- 2009–2011: WBC Wels

Career highlights
- Cyprus Division A champion (2009); Latvian league champion (2006); EuroCup Basketball Top Scorer (2004); Austrian Basketball Supercup MVP (2003); 3× Austrian Bundesliga champion (2002–2004); IBA Sixth Man of the Year (2001); Second-team Parade All-American (1995)

Rasheed H. Brokenborough (born June 24, 1977) is an American former professional basketball player. As a left-handed shooting guard, he had a successful high school career, finishing as the all-time top scorer of University City High School in Philadelphia and being considered one of the top players in the nation in his class. After having to sit out his first season of college basketball due to his insufficient SAT score, he was a 3-year starter at Temple. After going undrafted in the 1999 NBA draft, he played 11 years of professional basketball, mainly in Europe, when he won 5 national championships in 3 countries and was the EuroCup top scorer in 2004.

== High school career ==
Brokenborough was born in Philadelphia and grew up in West Philadelphia, in the area that was previously known as "The Black Bottom": coming from a poor background, he was raised by his grandmother Beulah Brokenborough and he lived in a neighborhood where robberies and other crimes were frequent. He started playing organized basketball at a young age, attending George Pepper Middle School in Southwest Philadelphia, and went on to enroll at University City High School, where he started playing varsity basketball in his sophomore year. He primarily played in the small forward position during his high school career, and he averaged 25.8 points in his first year. The following season he posted averages of 24.0 points, 12 rebounds and 6 assists, and was a 2nd team All-City selection.

For his senior year of high school Brokenborough averaged 28.5 points per game, was named All-City 1st team and player of the year, and ended his career with a total of 1,774 points, which made him the all-time scoring leader at University City. He was considered one of the top players of the state of Pennsylvania, and one of the best in the nation, being named as a second-team Parade All-American.

== College career ==
During his high school career Brokenborough was recruited by Temple, Pittsburgh and Kansas: he committed to Temple in 1994. Brokenborough was diagnosed with a learning disability and his attendance at University City was inconsistent, so he did not take SAT preparatory courses: as a result, he did not obtain the required SAT score to qualify for a scholarship, scoring a 790 and an 800 on his two takes while he needed at least an 820. Therefore, he was not granted a scholarship and had to pay his own expenses for his freshman year at Temple; he also could not play for the basketball team, as the NCAA deemed him ineligible.

With support from the staff at Temple and the help of a tutor he managed to achieve the required grades, choosing a degree in social administration. He regained his eligibility and played his first year of college basketball in the 1996–97 season: he started 30 out of 31 games (the only game he did not start was the one against Minnesota during the 1997 NCAA tournament), averaging 16 points, 4 rebounds, 2.5 assists and 1.5 steals in 37.7 minutes per game. He scored a career-high 31 points against Cincinnati on January 16, 1997, and he led the team in free throw percentage with 77%. He was also the second best scorer on the team behind Marc Jackson. At the end of the season he made the Atlantic 10 All-Rookie team along with teammate Pepe Sánchez.

In his junior year he started all 30 games, but his averages slightly decreased: he recorded 11.8 points, 3.3 rebounds, 2 assists and 1.6 steals while shooting a career-low 36% from the field in 31.9 minutes per game. His 11.8 points made him the second best scorer of the team behind Lamont Barnes. In his senior year he played a team-high 35.9 minutes per game, averaging 11.6 points, 3.7 rebounds, 2.7 assists and 1.6 steals while recording career-highs in all the shooting percentages (his free throw percentage of 79.6% was the best of his team). He scored 22 points (with 4 three-pointers) against Xavier and played 4 games during the 1999 NCAA tournament, averaging 8 points. The NCAA denied him an additional year of eligibility, and Brokenborough had to end his college career after the 1998–99 season.

Brokenborough started 95 out of 96 games at Temple, and scored 1,255 points (35th all-time as of 2019, 22nd at the time of his graduation).

=== College statistics ===
Year	Team	GP	GS	MPG	FG%	3P%	FT%	RPG	APG	SPG	BPG	PPG
1996–97	Temple	31	30	37.7	.366	.303	.770	4.0	2.5	1.5	0.1	16.0
1997–98	Temple	30	30	31.9	.360	.315	.670	3.3	2.0	1.6	0.2	11.8
1998–99	Temple	35	35	35.9	.382	.325	.796	3.7	2.7	1.6	0.2	11.6
Career		96	95	35.2	.369	.313	.746	3.7	2.4	1.6	0.2	13.1

== Professional career ==
After the end of his senior season, Brokenborough was automatically eligible for the 1999 NBA draft, but he was not drafted by an NBA franchise. He was drafted by the Grand Rapids Hoops in the 10th round of the 1999 CBA draft (87th overall) and he signed for them in November 1999, but he then signed for the Black Hills Gold for the International Basketball Association. In the 2000–01 IBA season he played 38 games (4 starts) for the South Dakota Gold (the Black Hills Gold had relocated elsewhere in South Dakota and changed their name) averaging 15.2 points, 3.1 rebounds and 3.1 assists in 28 minutes, while also shooting 43% from the three point line, and was named the Sixth Man of the Year.

Brokenborough then moved to Europe, signing for Austrian team Kapfenberg Bulls. He won 3 consecutive league titles and he was named 2003 Austrian Supercup MVP. In the 2003–04 season of the Bundesliga he played 37 games, averaging 25.6 points, 3.7 rebounds and 4 assists per game in 39.1 minutes. He also recorded 26.6 points per game during the 2003–04 ULEB Cup, and he was the top scorer of the competition. The good performances with the Bulls earned him a signing for Lleida, a Spanish team which was playing in Liga ACB. In the 2004–05 season he averaged 9.4 points, 1.5 rebounds and 1.2 assists playing 20 minutes per game in 11 appearances. He then moved to Venezuela and played for Cocodrilos de Caracas.

In 2005 he went back to Europe and signed for Latvian team BK Ventspils, where in 9 games he averaged 12.6 points, 3.1 rebounds and 3.2 assists in 22.8 minutes per game: at the end of the season he won the league title. In 2006 he transferred to Tofaş, a Turkish team based in Bursa, and he averaged 15.8 points, 2.9 rebounds and 2.8 assists while shooting 47.2% from the field in 35.1 minutes per game. In 2007 he moved to Italy, joining Scavolini Pesaro, where he played 34 games with averages of 5.8 points, 1.6 rebounds and 1.1 assists in 20.8 minutes. He played the following season in Cyprus, signing for APOEL, and he was named Forward of the Year for the 2008–09 season while also being selected in the All-League first team and in the All-Imports team. His team also won the league title.

He ended his career in Austria, playing two final seasons for WBC Wels: in 2009–10 he averaged 14 points, 2.7 rebounds and 2 assists per game, and in 2010–11 he recorded 19.5 points per game (3rd best in the league), while also posting 3.4 rebounds and 2.4 assists in 34 games played.
