= South Dakota Gold =

American basketball team

- Division: East (2000–01)
- League: IBA
- Established: 2000
- Folded: 2001
- History: Black Hills Gold; 1999–2000; South Dakota Gold 2000–2001
- Arena: Corn Palace
- Capacity: 3,200
- Location: Mitchell, South Dakota
- Team colors
- Team manager: Rick Lindner
- Ownership: Keary Ecklund

The South Dakota Gold were a short-lived professional basketball team based in Mitchell, South Dakota. They played one season in the International Basketball Association (IBA).

== History ==
Before the 2000–01 IBA season the Black Hills Gold, a franchise based in Rapid City, South Dakota, relocated to Mitchell and changed its name to South Dakota Gold. The franchise was owned by Keary Ecklund, while Rick Lindner served as the team's general manager. On October 1, 2000 the Gold announced Reggie Williams as their new head coach. The team opened the season on November 24, 2000 against the Salina Rattlers, winning the game 90–71. On December 3, 2000 center LeRon Williams recorded a season-high 34 points in an 88–87 home win against the Salina Rattlers. Two days later the team recorded its first loss, 86–88 in overtime against the Rattlers. On December 11, 2000 coach Reggie Williams resigned, and was replaced two days later by Marcus Liberty, who served as player and coach for the team. The newly appointed coach debuted with an 81–96 loss to the Des Moines Dragons. On December 31, 2000 guard Jermaine Slider recorded a season-high 12 assists against the Winnipeg Cyclone, while on January 4, 2001 LeRon Williams recorded a season-best 13 rebounds, along with 21 points in a game against the Billings RimRockers.

The South Dakota Gold regularly brought up to 1,000 fans to the Corn Palace every game. The team's best attendance for a regular season home game was on December 1, 2000 when 1,238 people attended the season opener against Fargo-Moorhead Beez. This game ended with a Gold win, 91–76. The average attendance for regular season home games was 930.

The team ended the regular season with a 21–19 record, which put them on the second place in the East Division behind the Des Moines Dragons. The Gold advanced to the division semifinals, which saw them lose the series 2–1 against the Siouxland Bombers, with the last game going to overtime and ending in a Gold loss, 90–98. Guard Rasheed Brokenborough was named IBA Sixth Man of the Year, while center LeRon Williams was the team's top scorer (19 points per game) and top rebounder (7.9).

== Season-by-season records ==
| Years | Wins | Losses | Winning percentage | Head coach(s) | Ref |
|---|---|---|---|---|---|
| 2000–01 | 21 | 19 | .525 | Reggie Williams, then Marcus Liberty | |

== All-time roster ==
- Rasheed Brokenborough (Temple)
- H. L. Coleman (Wyoming)
- Katu Davis (Georgia)
- Marvin Gay (Murray State)
- Wayne Houston (Southern Indiana)
- Harold Jackson (District of Columbia)
- Daron Jenkins (Southern Miss)
- Gary Johnson (USC)
- Marcus Liberty (Illinois)
- Tony Lovan (Western Kentucky)
- Eric Martin (Oklahoma)
- Damien McSwine (Loyola (IL)
- Ryan Miller (Northern State)
- Derrick Price (Shepherd)
- Jermaine Slider (Fairleigh Dickinson)
- Damon Watlington (Virginia Tech)
- Sherron Wilkerson (Rio Grande)
- LeRon Williams (South Carolina)

== Awards ==
- IBA Sixth Man of the Year: Rasheed Brokenborough
