= Walter Dean =

American football player (born 1968)

No. 42, 26
- Position: Running back

Personal information
- Born: June 1, 1968 (age 58); Ruston, Louisiana, U.S.
- Listed height: 5 ft 10 in (1.78 m)
- Listed weight: 216 lb (98 kg)

Career information
- High school: Grambling State University Laboratory (Grambling, Louisiana)
- College: Grambling State (1988–1990)
- NFL draft: 1991: 6th round, 149th overall pick

Career history
- Green Bay Packers (1991); Shreveport Pirates (1994)

Awards and highlights
- Walter Payton Award (1990)

Career NFL statistics
- Kickoff returns: 1
- Stats at Pro Football Reference

Walter Kevin Dean (born June 1, 1968) is an American former professional football player who was a running back for the Green Bay Packers of the National Football League (NFL). He played college football for the Grambling State Tigers. In his senior year, he led the nation in rushing and won the 1990 Walter Payton Award as the most outstanding player in Division I-AA football. He was selected by the Packers in the sixth round of the 1991 NFL draft.

== Early life ==
Dean was born on June 1, 1968, in Ruston, Louisiana, to Walter, a concrete company dispatcher, and Betty Dean, an administrative secretary at Grambling State University. He also has a younger brother who played soccer, Keith, who was one of Louisiana's leading interscholastic players, and with whom he shared a bunk-bed according to their mother. Walter Dean attended Grambling State University Laboratory High School in Grambling, Louisiana and turned down offers from major college football programs such as Nebraska and Louisiana State in order to attend Grambling State. Dean said, "I wanted to go to a college where everybody I knew wouldn't have to sign up for a frequent-flyer program in order to see me play."

== College career ==
At Grambling, Dean studied business management and played football for the Grambling State Tigers as a running back. He earned the nickname "American Express" due to the belief of his coach, Eddie Robinson, that the team should 'never leave home without him', a saying similar to the slogan of the eponymous credit card company. Sports Illustrated called Dean possibly the "best runner produced by a predominantly black college since Walter Payton came out of Jackson State in 1975." Former Grambling and Los Angeles Rams fullback Paul "Tank" Younger said about Dean, "You take one look at him and you think, hey, he doesn't look that tough. He isn't the huge, muscle-flexing type of back, but once you see him run the ball, you want to check out his scrapbook."

At Grambling, Dean recorded a career total of 3,328 yards and 41 touchdowns. As a junior in 1989, Dean scored 18 touchdowns and set a school rushing record when he compiled 1,269 yards. In 1990, Dean recorded 17 touchdowns and the Division I-AA season-best 1,401 rushing yards. Against Elizabeth City, he recorded 137 yards on just 15 carries (9.13 average). Against Hampton, he compiled a career-high 232 yards and helped lead the Tigers to a 22-3 victory. Grambling finished the season with an 8–3 record, including a win against their arch-rival, Southern, in the Bayou Classic.

Eddie Robinson believed that Dean was deserving of the Heisman Trophy, awarded annually to the best college football player, but acknowledged that voters would not seriously consider a Division I-AA player for the honor. Dean did, however, win the Walter Payton Award, which is the award bestowed annually upon Division I-AA football's most outstanding player.

== Professional career ==
Dean was selected in the sixth round of the 1991 NFL draft by the Green Bay Packers (149th pick overall). He played one season for Green Bay. In 1991, he saw action in nine games and recorded one kick return and one fumble.
