= 1997 NCAA Men's Basketball All-Americans =

- Awarded for: 1996–97 NCAA Division I men's basketball season

The Consensus 1997 College Basketball All-American team, as determined by aggregating the results of three major All-American teams. To earn "consensus" status, a player must win honors from a majority of the following teams: the Associated Press, the USBWA and the National Association of Basketball Coaches.

== 1997 Consensus All-America team ==
Consensus First Team
Player	Position	Class	Team
Tim Duncan	C	Senior	Wake Forest
Danny Fortson	F	Junior	Cincinnati
Raef LaFrentz	C	Junior	Kansas
Ron Mercer	F	Sophomore	Kentucky
Keith Van Horn	F	Senior	Utah

Consensus Second Team
Player	Position	Class	Team
Chauncey Billups	G	Sophomore	Colorado
Bobby Jackson	G	Senior	Minnesota
Antawn Jamison	F	Sophomore	North Carolina
Brevin Knight	G	Senior	Stanford
Jacque Vaughn	G	Senior	Kansas

== Individual All-America teams ==
All-America Team
All-America Team	First team		Second team		Third team	
All-America Team	Player	School	Player	School	Player	School
Associated Press	Tim Duncan	Wake Forest	Chauncey Billups	Colorado	Keith Booth	Maryland
Associated Press	Danny Fortson	Cincinnati	Bobby Jackson	Minnesota	Adonal Foyle	Colgate
Associated Press	Raef LaFrentz	Kansas	Antawn Jamison	North Carolina	Ed Gray	California
Associated Press	Ron Mercer	Kentucky	Brevin Knight	Stanford	Shea Seals	Tulsa
Associated Press	Keith Van Horn	Utah	Jacque Vaughn	Kansas	Andre Woolridge	Iowa
USBWA	Tim Duncan	Wake Forest	Chauncey Billups	Colorado	No third team	
USBWA	Danny Fortson	Cincinnati	Adonal Foyle	Colgate	No third team	
USBWA	Raef LaFrentz	Kansas	Bobby Jackson	Minnesota	No third team	
USBWA	Ron Mercer	Kentucky	Brevin Knight	Stanford	No third team	
USBWA	Keith Van Horn	Utah	Jacque Vaughn	Kansas	No third team	
NABC	Tim Duncan	Wake Forest	Chauncey Billups	Colorado	Keith Booth	Maryland
NABC	Danny Fortson	Cincinnati	Bobby Jackson	Minnesota	Ed Gray	California
NABC	Raef LaFrentz	Kansas	Antawn Jamison	North Carolina	Jerald Honeycutt	Tulane
NABC	Ron Mercer	Kentucky	Brevin Knight	Stanford	Shea Seals	Tulsa
NABC	Keith Van Horn	Utah	Jacque Vaughn	Kansas	DeJuan Wheat	Louisville

AP Honorable Mention:

- Danya Abrams, Boston College
- Toby Bailey, UCLA
- Tony Battie, Texas Tech
- Cory Carr, Texas Tech
- Anthony Carter, Hawaii
- Antonio Daniels, Bowling Green
- Larry Davis, South Carolina
- Thaddeus Delaney, College of Charleston
- Michael Dickerson, Arizona
- Reggie Freeman, Texas
- Kiwane Garris, Illinois
- Pat Garrity, Notre Dame
- Matt Harpring, Georgia Tech
- Odell Hodge, Old Dominion
- Jerald Honeycutt, Tulane
- Marc Jackson, Temple
- Sam Jacobson, Minnesota
- DeMarco Johnson, Charlotte
- Charles Jones, Long Island
- Trajan Langdon, Duke
- BJ McKie, South Carolina
- Charles O'Bannon, UCLA
- Victor Page, Georgetown
- Anthony Parker, Bradley
- Paul Pierce, Kansas
- Scot Pollard, Kansas
- Charles Smith, New Mexico
- Olivier Saint-Jean, San Jose State
- Kenny Thomas, New Mexico
- Tim Thomas, Villanova
- Melvin Watson, South Carolina
- DeJuan Wheat, Louisville
- Alvin Williams, Villanova
- Dedric Willoughby, Iowa State
