= Darnell Robinson =

American basketball player (born 1974)

Personal information
- Born: May 30, 1974 (age 52) Oakland, California, U.S.
- Listed height: 6 ft 11 in (2.11 m)
- Listed weight: 270 lb (122 kg)

Career information
- High school: Emery (Emeryville, California)
- College: Arkansas (1993–1996)
- NBA draft: 1996: 2nd round, 58th overall pick
- Drafted by: Dallas Mavericks
- Playing career: 1996–2000
- Position: Center

Career history
- 1996–1997: Genertel Trieste
- 1997: Gigantes de Carolina
- 1997: Bnei Herzliya
- 1997–1999: Apollon Patras
- 1999: PSG Racing
- 1999–2000: Aris Thessaloniki

Career highlights
- NCAA champion (1994); McDonald's All-American (1993); 2× Second-team Parade All-American (1992, 1993)
- Stats at Basketball Reference

Darnell Lamont Robinson (born May 30, 1974) is an American former professional basketball player and a member of the University of Arkansas Razorbacks 1994 NCAA national champion men's basketball team, playing center (6'11" 245 lbs). He holds the national high school career record for most blocked shots with 1,187

Robinson was selected a McDonald's All-American following an exceptional high school career at Emery High School, where he finished as the leading scorer in California boy's high school basketball history with a total of 3,361 points (breaking the previous record held by Tracy Murray). He scored 19 points, arguably outplaying the more highly regarded Rasheed Wallace in the 1993 game. He also recorded 1,187 career blocks at Emery, the all-time record for high school basketball according to the National Federation of State High School Associations: he had 241 as a freshman, 281 as a sophomore, 334 as a junior and 331 as a senior. His 334 blocks in 1991–92 were an all-time record for blocks in a single season from 1992 to 2009, when it was broken by Angelo Chol's 337.

Robinson was drafted by the Dallas Mavericks with the 29th pick of the 2nd round of the 1996 NBA draft after leaving Arkansas a season early. He later signed with the Philadelphia 76ers, but never played in the NBA. Robinson ended up playing professionally in Italy, Greece, Israel, Puerto Rico and France.

Robinson's coach in Greece referred to him as "one of the greatest underachievers I've ever been involved with."
