= Sherron Wilkerson =

American basketball player and coach

Personal information
- Born: April 27, 1975 (age 51) Jeffersonville, Indiana, U.S.
- Listed height: 6 ft 3 in (1.91 m)
- Listed weight: 198 lb (90 kg)

Career information
- High school: Jeffersonville (Jeffersonville, Indiana)
- College: Indiana (1993–1996); Rio Grande (1996–1997)
- NBA draft: 1998: undrafted
- Playing career: 1998–2005
- Position: Shooting guard / point guard

Career history
- 1997–1998: Wisconsin Blast
- 1998: Columbus Cagerz
- 1998–2000: Södertälje Kings
- 2000: South Dakota Gold
- 2000–2001: BK LMT
- 2001: Premiata Montegranaro
- 2001–2002: BK Ventspils
- 2002–2003: Fenerbahçe
- 2003–2004: Universo/BH/Minas
- 2004–2005: Maccabi Haifa

Career highlights
- Latvian league champion (2002); McDonald's All-American (1993)

Sherron Edward Wilkerson (born April 27, 1975) is an American former professional basketball player. More recently, he was the head coach of the Logansport High School basketball team, coaching only one season. In May 2022, he accepted the head coach position at his alma mater, Jeffersonville High School. Wilkerson led the Jeffersonville Red Devils to a 4A State Championship in 2025, defeating a previously unbeaten Fishers basketball team, 67–66 in overtime. This was Jeffersonville's first state title since he played for them.

== High school career ==
Born in Jeffersonville, Indiana to mother Phyllis Wilkerson, Wilkerson attended Jeffersonville High School, where he started playing varsity basketball in his sophomore year. He was an athletic combo guard who primarily played the shooting guard position: he had a 41-inch vertical, and displayed more defensive ability and team play than scoring attitude. He wore number 20 and averaged 14.1 points in his junior year. That year, he helped his team reaching the state championship finals, in which they lost. He committed to Indiana in September 1992.

He had a very successful senior year, during which he won the 1993 IHSAA state championship while averaging 16.5 points and 7.0 assists. He was considered one of the top shooting guards in the nation, and earned a selection in the McDonald's All-American team: in the 1993 McDonald's All-American Boys Game he did not score. He recorded totals of 1,140 points and 404 assists in 83 games played at Jeffersonville High.

He was originally named 1993 Indiana Mr. Basketball, winning over Maurice Fuller of Anderson by two votes, but the award was then vacated and given to Fuller after Wilkerson left the Indiana All-Star team during a game versus the Kentucky All-Stars while protesting against the coach's decision to bench him. Wilkerson later agreed with the decision to give the Mr. Basketball title to Fuller, renouncing the award and declaring that he felt that his behavior at the All-Star game was a mistake. He was named Indiana Gatorade Player of the Year in 1993.

== College career ==
Wilkerson appeared consistently during his freshman season at Indiana, even though he was not a starter. Wilkerson was headbutted by coach Bob Knight in a March 1994 game against Michigan State while Knight was berating him during a timeout; Knight later claimed that it was an accident, and that the headbutt was unintentional. Wilkerson ended his first season of college basketball with 28 games played, with averages of 3.2 points, 2.3 rebounds and 2.0 assists.

He sat out his sophomore season on a medical redshirt due to a broken leg. He returned in 1995, and he became a starter, playing almost 30 minutes per game. He averaged 7.5 points, 3.5 rebounds and 3.2 assists in the first 17 games of the season. However, in late January 1996 he was dismissed from the team. He was arrested in Bloomington, Indiana after the police was called during an argument between him and his girlfriend in the early morning hours: he was jailed for 12 hours and charged with domestic battery.

After leaving Indiana, Wilkerson decided to play for University of Rio Grande, which participated in the Mid-Ohio Conference of the NAIA; he averaged 25 points per game and was selected in the First Team All-Mid-Ohio Conference.

=== College statistics ===
Year	Team	GP	GS	MPG	FG%	3P%	FT%	RPG	APG	SPG	BPG	PPG
1993–94	Indiana	28	12	17.3	.359	.294	.686	2.3	2.0	0.5	0.4	3.2
1994–95	Indiana	Did not play – medical redshirt										
1995–96	Indiana	17	13	29.5	.387	.323	.673	3.5	3.2	0.9	0.1	7.5
Career		45	25	23.4	.375	.308	.678	2.7	2.5	0.6	0.2	4.8

== Professional career ==
In 1997 Wilkerson signed for the Wisconsin Blast of the International Basketball Association, thus beginning his professional career. He entered his name in the 1998 NBA draft, but he was not selected. He then played for the Columbus Cagerz in their inaugural season in the United States Basketball League. In October 1998 he signed for the Swedish team Sodertalje Kings, where he played for 2 seasons, leaving the team in 2000. He played 80 games in the Swedish top league, scoring 1,271 points (15.9 average).

He then joined the South Dakota Gold of the IBA, being released in December 2000; after that he transferred to Latvia, signing for BK LMT. Between July and December 2001 he played in the Serie A2 Basket for Premiata Montegranaro, averaging 14.8 points, 4.6 rebounds and 1.3 assists in 32.8 minutes per game. After Italy he returned to Latvia, this time joining BK Ventspils.

In October 2002 he had a trial for the Opel Skyliners in Germany. In May 2003 he briefly played in the Turkish Basketball Super League, and in 4 games he averaged 9.0 points, 3.8 rebounds and 1.3 assists in 26.5 minutes per game.

He moved to Brazil in 2003, playing during the 2004 Liga Sudamericana de Básquetbol with Minas Tênis Clube. He ended his professional career in Israel, after playing 5 games in the Israeli Premier League, where he recorded averages of 2.8 points, 1.8 rebounds and 0.6 assists in 15.6 minutes per game.
