= Edyth May Sliffe Award =

The Edyth May Sliffe Award is given annually to roughly 20 teachers in the United States by the Mathematical Association of America (MAA). The awards are funded by a bequest from a retired high school mathematics teacher named Edyth May Sliffe, of Emeryville, California. Her purpose was to award high school teachers whose students have done well on the AHSME, now the AMC 12. She felt students who won in math competitions received honors, but their teachers never received any recognition.

== Overview ==
Edyth May Sliffe, a retired teacher who taught at Emery High School, felt that teachers also needed recognition for their contributions toward the students' success. In 1978, she contacted the Governor of the Northern California Section of the MAA, Professor Kenneth Rebman. Kenneth Rebman then told the President of the MAA, Professor Henry Alder, and arranged a meeting with Sliffe. She decided to use her estate to recognize 20 teachers of the highest scoring teams annually. Edyth Sliffe died on December 11, 1986. In accordance with her will, over $250,000 was donated to the MAA. Since 1989, about 20 high school teachers from the top 60 American and Canadian schools have received the award annually. In 1995, the MAA Committee extended the award to middle school teachers. Five teachers are selected from each of the ten American Mathematics Competition Regions.

== Nomination ==
Three students from each of the top 60 highest scoring teams in the AMC 12 are asked to nominate a teacher they felt contributed most to their success.

== Reward ==
Award-winning teachers win a cash prize of $350-$750 depending on the student's score, a pin, 20 subscriptions to Math Horizons to distribute to students, a letter from the president of the MAA, a certificate signed by the president of MAA, Chair of the committee on the AMC 12, and the executive director of the American Mathematics Competitions. In addition, they get one year free membership in the MAA, and recognition in national and regional professional publications. The award ceremony is arranged by the school administrators. For middle school teachers, the award is $100.

== Edyth May Sliffe Awards Committee ==
- Steven R Dunbar
- Harold B Reiter
- David Hankin
- Bonnie Leitch
- Elgin H Johnston
- Mark E Saul
- Cheryl M Hawker
- Gail A Kaplan

== See also ==
- List of mathematics awards
