= Keith Booth =

American basketball player and coach (born 1974)

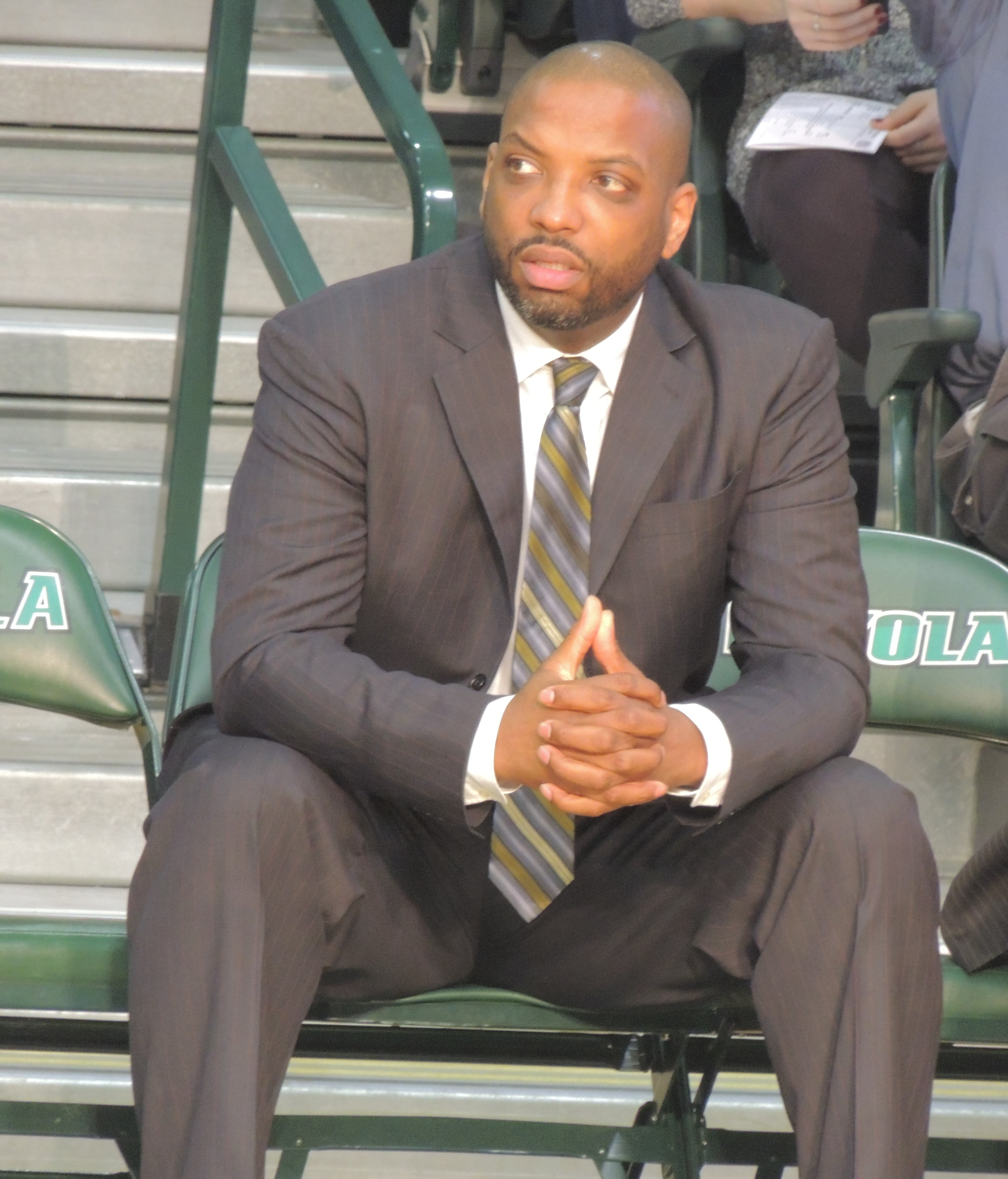
- Booth coaching in 2017

Personal information
- Born: October 9, 1974 (age 52) Baltimore, Maryland, U.S.
- Listed height: 6 ft 6 in (1.98 m)
- Listed weight: 226 lb (103 kg)

Career information
- High school: Paul Laurence Dunbar (Baltimore, Maryland)
- College: Maryland (1993–1997)
- NBA draft: 1997: 1st round, 28th overall pick
- Drafted by: Chicago Bulls
- Playing career: 1997–2000
- Position: Small forward
- Number: 22
- Coaching career: 2004–2018

Career history

Playing
- 1997–1999: Chicago Bulls
- 1999–2000: Baltimore Bayrunners

Coaching
- 2004–2011: Maryland (assistant)
- 2011–2013: Loyola (Maryland) (women's assistant)
- 2013–2018: Loyola (Maryland) (men's assistant)

Career highlights
- NBA champion (1998); Third-team All-American – AP, NABC (1997); First-team All-ACC (1997); Third-team All-ACC (1996); Second-team Parade All-American (1993); McDonald's All-American (1993)

Career NBA statistics
- Points: 130 (2.9 ppg)
- Rebounds: 97 (2.2 rpg)
- Assists: 39 (0.9 apg)
- Stats at NBA.com
- Stats at Basketball Reference

Keith Eugene Booth (born October 9, 1974) is an American basketball coach and former National Basketball Association (NBA) player. Booth played college basketball at the University of Maryland from 1993 to 1997. He was an assistant coach at his alma mater under Gary Williams from 2004 to 2011. He was also an assistant coach for G. G. Smith with the Loyola University Maryland men's basketball team.

Booth was born and raised in Baltimore and attended Paul Laurence Dunbar High School. While playing for Dunbar in 1992, the team won the high school basketball national championship and Booth was named a 1993

Heavily recruited by coach Gary Williams, he was the first player from Baltimore City in several years to play for Maryland. After the resignation of Williams' predecessor, Bob Wade, due to NCAA violations, a de facto boycott of the university was put in place by the high-school coaches in Baltimore. Because of this boycott, many star high-school players avoided Maryland as a choice to play their college ball. In becoming one of the members of Maryland's 1993 recruiting class, Booth broke the ice, and the school once again had access to talent-rich Baltimore City. While playing for the Terps, Booth led in free throws with 576 and had 1,776 points scored.

Booth was the Chicago Bulls' first-pick (28th overall) in the 1997 NBA Draft and played two seasons with the Bulls. Booth later returned to the Maryland campus and earned a bachelor's degree in criminology and criminal justice in 2003. After getting his degree, he worked at the Park School of Baltimore in Brooklandville, Maryland, where he was the middle school baseball coach. He also volunteered at an after-school program at his former high school, Dunbar.

In 2004, he returned to his alma mater to become an assistant under Williams. He organized recruiting as well as promoting and directing the Gary Williams Summer Basketball Camp each Summer in College Park. After Williams' retirement in 2011, Booth left Maryland when incoming head coach Mark Turgeon chose not to retain him.

In October 2011, Booth was named a women's basketball assistant coach at Loyola University Maryland. He transitioned to the school's men's basketball team in a similar capacity on April 16, 2013. In May, 2019, Booth became head coach of Dunbar High School's basketball team, remaining at the helm of his alma mater's team until February, 2021.
