= Rashard Griffith =

American basketball player (born 1974)

Personal information
- Born: October 8, 1974 (age 52) Chicago, Illinois, U.S.
- Listed height: 6 ft 11 in (2.11 m)
- Listed weight: 280 lb (127 kg)

Career information
- High school: King (Chicago, Illinois)
- College: Wisconsin (1993–1995)
- NBA draft: 1995: 2nd round, 38th overall pick
- Drafted by: Milwaukee Bucks
- Playing career: 1995–2010
- Position: Center
- Number: 15, 54

Career history
- 1995–1997: Tofaş
- 1997–1998: Maccabi Tel Aviv
- 1998–2000: Tofaş
- 2000–2002: Kinder Bologna
- 2002–2003: Tau Cerámica
- 2003–2004: Lottomatica Roma
- 2004–2005: Tenerife
- 2005: Capitanes de Arecibo
- 2005–2006: Aguas de Calpe
- 2007: Pınar Karşıyaka
- 2007–2010: CSU Asesoft Ploiesti

Career highlights
- EuroLeague champion (2001); All-EuroLeague Second Team (2001); FIBA EuroStar (1997); Italian League champion (2001); Italian Cup winner (2001); Italian Cup MVP (2001); 2× Turkish League champion (1999, 2000); Turkish Cup winner (1999); Israeli League champion (1998); Israeli Cup winner (1998); BSN champion (2005); Romanian League champion (2008); Romanian Cup winner (2008); McDonald's All-American (1993); Second-team Parade All-American (1993); Third-team Parade All-American (1992); Illinois Mr. Basketball (1993)
- Stats at Basketball Reference

Rashard Nathan Griffith (born October 8, 1974) is an American former professional basketball player. He played college basketball for the Wisconsin Badgers.

== Early career ==
A native of Chicago, Illinois, Griffith starred for the nationally ranked King Jaguars of the Chicago Public League, where he was part of a "twin towers," as King, coached by Landon Cox, had 7'2" Thomas Hamilton and the 7'0" Griffith. Griffith had been considered the top prep center in the country until he was outplayed by Rasheed Wallace at the prestigious Nike Camp in Indianapolis. King won a state championship in 1993, and after dominating the high school ranks and being named Illinois Mr. Basketball, Rashard joined the Wisconsin Badgers college basketball team. Griffith selected Wisconsin over his mother's preference of Purdue University and a long list of other schools, including Arizona, Duke, Kentucky, Michigan, Notre Dame, Ohio State, Oklahoma, and Illinois.

== College career ==
Griffith made his college debut on November 27, 1993, against UW-Milwaukee, posting 27 points, 12 rebounds, six assists, three steals and two blocked shots. Alongside fellow Chicago-area prep stars Michael Finley and Tracy Webster, Griffith helped the Badgers to their first appearance in the NCAA Tournament in 47 years. After averaging 13.9 points and 8.5 rebounds as a freshman, Griffith considered leaving school but ultimately returned. The following season Griffith was named First Team All-Big Ten by the media after averaging 17.2 points and 10.8 rebounds. In only two seasons, Griffith set a Wisconsin individual record for most blocks in a career, later surpassed.

After his sophomore year, Griffith turned pro and was a second round pick in the 1995 NBA draft.

== Professional career ==
The Milwaukee Bucks made Griffith the 38th overall selection in the 1995 NBA draft. Though he attended summer training camp and was in Milwaukee for individual workouts over the years, Griffith was never able to come to a contract agreement with the team.

Spurning the NBA for a larger contract, Griffith signed to play with Tofaş Bursa in Turkey. He helped the club reach the 1997 Korać Cup final against Aris. Tofas won back-to-back Turkish League titles in 1999 and 2000 during Griffith's second stint. After five years in Turkish and Israeli leagues, Griffith moved to Italian League power Kinder Bologna. There he earned a spot on the All-Euroleague second team during the Euroleague 2000-01 season playing alongside Manu Ginóbili, Marko Jarić and Antoine Rigaudeau. Kinder Bologna won the Triple Crown in Basketball the same year.

After his success in Europe, the Orlando Magic acquired Griffith's draft rights in a trade during the 2002 NBA draft with the intent of adding him to their roster, but Griffith never played in the NBA.

He has also played for Maccabi Tel Aviv in Israel, Tau Cerámica, Tenerife and Calpe in Spain, Lottomatica Roma in Italy and Capitanes de Arecibo in Puerto Rico. He won the 1998 Israeli League with Maccabi and the 2005 Puerto Rican League with Arecibo.

The final club for Griffith was Romanian CSU Asesoft Ploiesti. In 2010, he retired.

== Personal life ==
Griffith returned to the University of Wisconsin in 2017 to continue his studies, living with former teammate Howard Moore while he took classes. Meanwhile, he became a mentor for the men's basketball team. In May 2020, Griffith graduated with a degree in community and non-profit leadership.

In 2022, Griffith was named head coach of the girls' basketball team at Middleton High School in Middleton, Wisconsin.

Awards and achievements
Preceded by Chris Collins	Illinois Mr. Basketball Award Winner; 1993	Succeeded by Jarrod Gee
