= Black Hills Gold =

- History: Tampa Bay Thrillers (1984–1987); Rapid City Thrillers (1987–1995); Florida Beach Dogs (1995–1997); Rapid City Thrillers (1998–1999); Black Hills Gold (1999–2000); South Dakota Gold (2000–2001)

The Black Hills Gold was an American professional basketball club based in Rapid City, South Dakota that competed in the International Basketball Association (IBA) for a single season (1999/2000). The team followed two previous Rapid City IBA teams, the Black Hills Posse, which played from 1995 through 1998, and the Rapid City Thrillers, which played in the 1998/1999 season. In 2000, the team moved to Mitchell, South Dakota and played for one season as the South Dakota Gold, then folded.
