= Emery Unified School District =

School district in California, United States

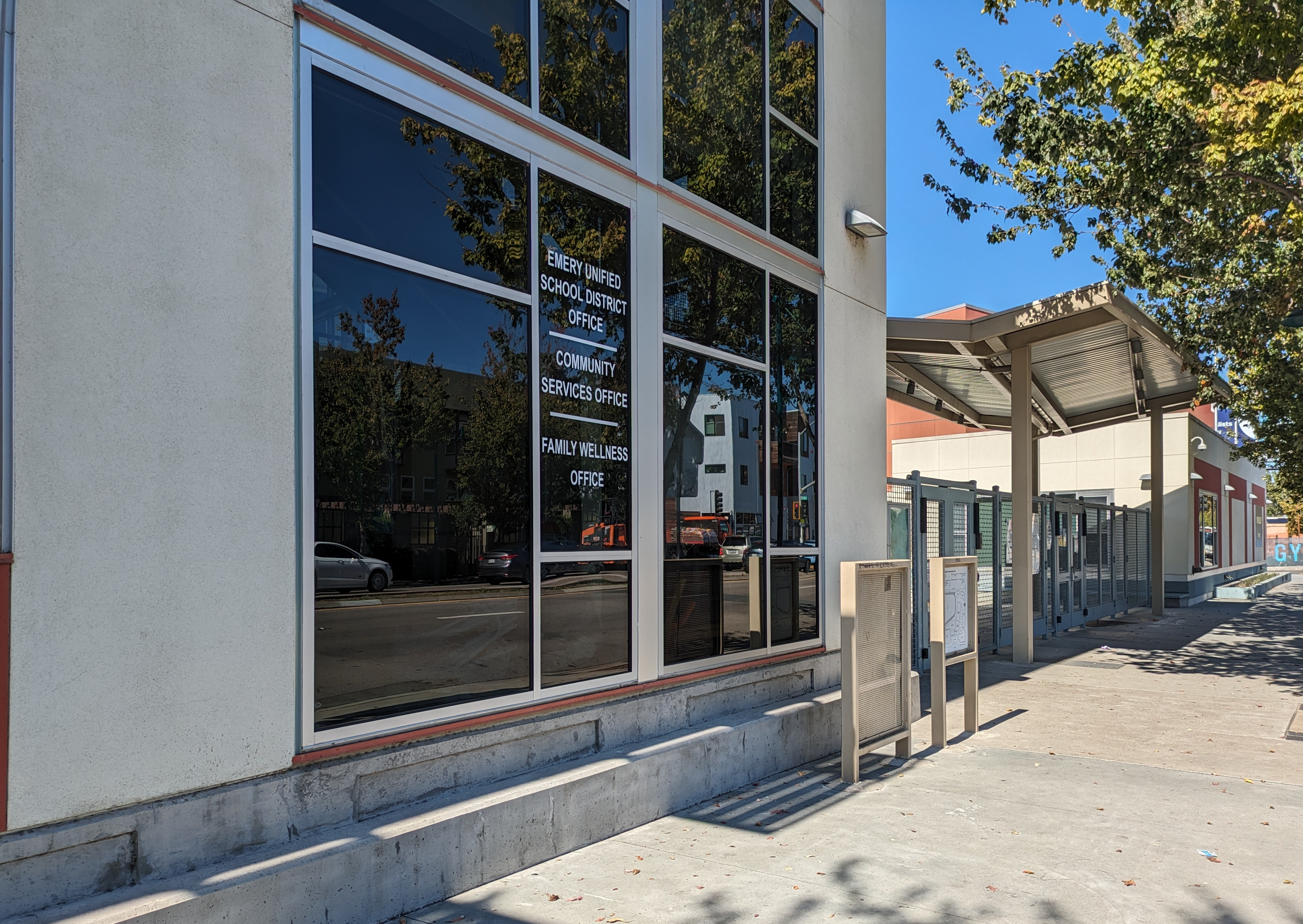
- District office

Address
- 4727 San Pablo Avenue Emeryville, California, 94608; United States

District information
- Type: Public
- Grades: K–12
- NCES District ID: 0612630

Students and staff
- Students: 698
- Teachers: 37.0
- Staff: 33.0
- Student–teacher ratio: 18.86

Other information
- Website: emeryusd.k12.ca.us

Emery Unified School District is a small public school district in Emeryville, California, United States, in the San Francisco Bay Area.

== Campuses ==
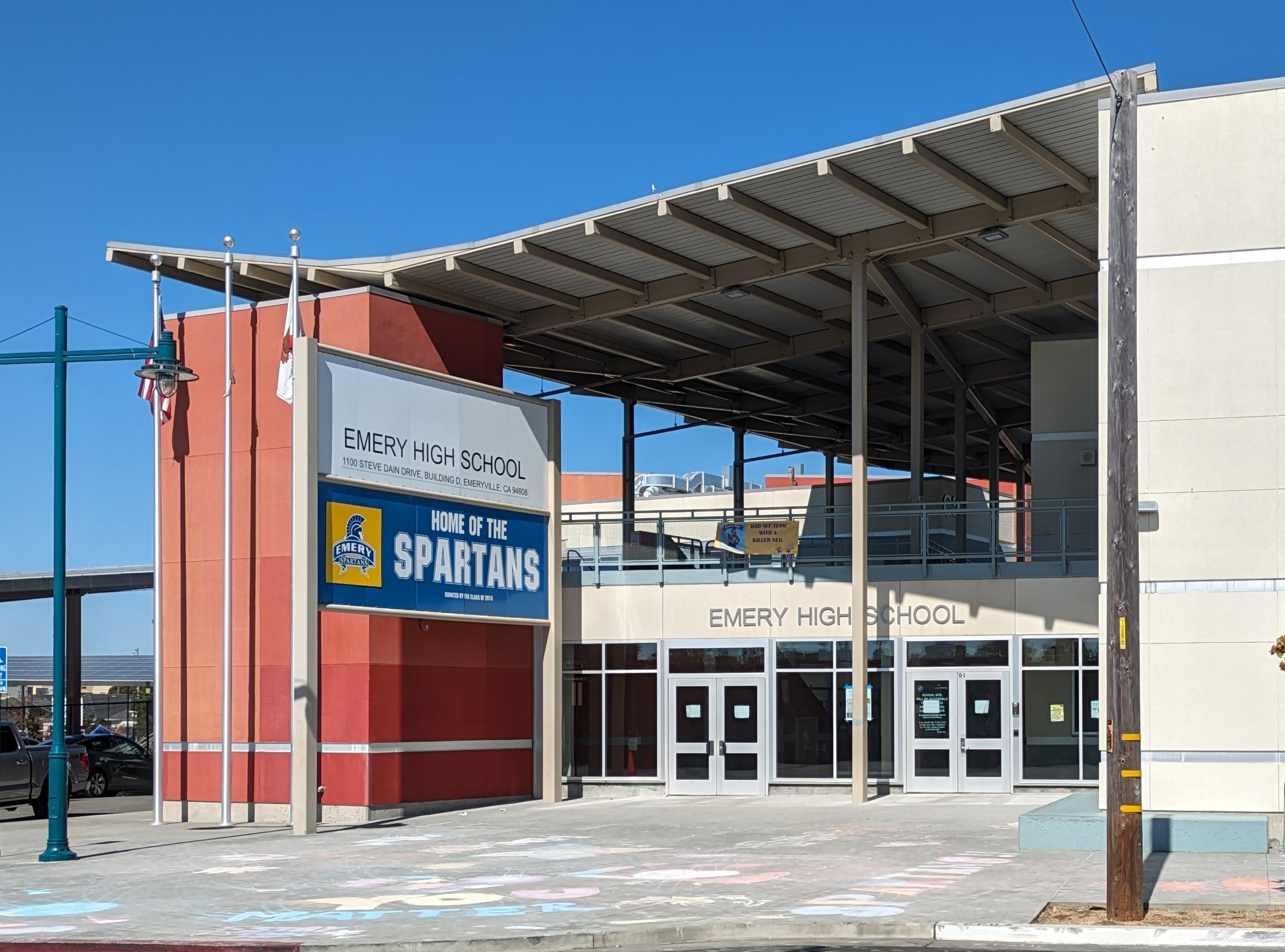
Emery High School in 2023

The district currently operates two schools, Anna Yates Elementary school and Emery Secondary School. Previously the schools had separate campuses, but they are now closed.The schools moved to a shared campus in August 2016 at the newly constructed state-of-the-art facility called Emeryville Center for Community Life. Also sharing the ECCL site are the Emery Unified School District Office, a community health center, and city of Emeryville community and recreation spaces.

Emery Secondary School was formerly Emeryville High School; after the closure of Emery Middle School, it became a secondary school with the addition of the 7th and 8th grades. The school building was scheduled to close in 2012 and be replaced by a new facility, housing transitional kindergarten - 8th grades, and 9th - 12th grade sites. Eddie Scruggs Smith is the principal of Emery Secondary School.

As of 2017 the East Bay campus of the German International School of Silicon Valley occupies the ex-Anna Yates School.This campus will close after spring 2018 and reorganize into a separate school, called the East Bay German International School.

== Programs ==
Emery Secondary School competes in the Bay Counties League - East.

The Oakland Raiders annually visit a fourth grade class to encourage the students to work smarter, not harder.

== Demographics ==
Emery high school has an enrollment of around 200 students.

Over 50% of females and about 50% of males in grades 2-6 were rated "proficient" and above on CST STAR testing for the 2010–2011 school year in mathematics. Over 40% of females and over 35% of males were proficient or above in English-Language Arts.

For grades 7–11 in the 2010–2011 school year, over 30% of females and 25% of males were proficient or above in English-Language Arts.

The student body is 70% African American, 14% Hispanic American, 11% Asian American, and 5% Caucasian and Pacific Islanders. 4.8% live in poverty and 4% are English learners.

== Notable alumni ==
- Darnell Robinson (1993), retired professional basketball player; while at Emery High, he was the leading scorer in California men's high school basketball history.

== Notable faculty ==
- Edyth May Sliffe, 1901–1986, namesake of an annual award by the Mathematical Association of America.
