= Jerry Stackhouse =

American basketball player and coach (born 1974)

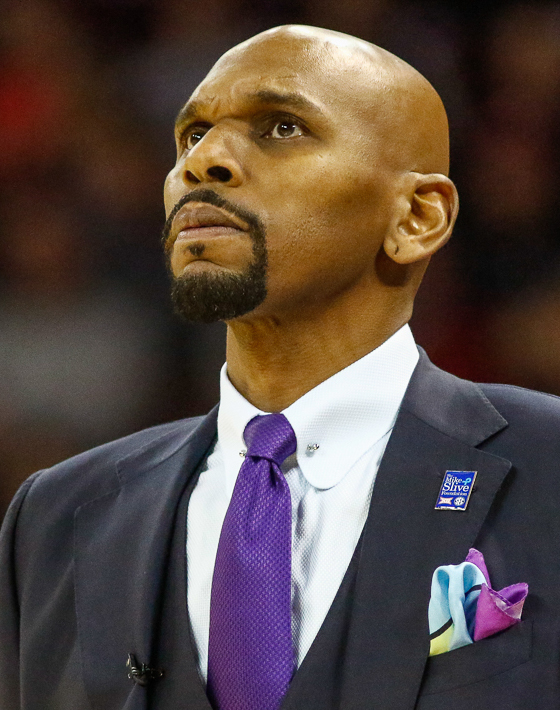
- Stackhouse in 2020

Personal information
- Born: November 5, 1974 (age 52) Kinston, North Carolina, U.S.
- Listed height: 6 ft 6 in (1.98 m)
- Listed weight: 218 lb (99 kg)

Career information
- High school: Kinston (Kinston, North Carolina); Oak Hill Academy (Mouth of Wilson, Virginia)
- College: North Carolina (1993–1995)
- NBA draft: 1995: 1st round, 3rd overall pick
- Drafted by: Philadelphia 76ers
- Playing career: 1995–2013
- Position: Shooting guard / small forward
- Number: 42, 24
- Coaching career: 2015–present

Career history

Playing
- 1995–1997: Philadelphia 76ers
- 1997–2002: Detroit Pistons
- 2002–2004: Washington Wizards
- 2004–2009: Dallas Mavericks
- 2010: Milwaukee Bucks
- 2010: Miami Heat
- 2011–2012: Atlanta Hawks
- 2012–2013: Brooklyn Nets

Coaching
- 2015–2016: Toronto Raptors (assistant)
- 2016–2018: Raptors 905
- 2018–2019: Memphis Grizzlies (assistant)
- 2019–2024: Vanderbilt
- 2024–2026: Golden State Warriors (assistant)

Career highlights
- As player: 2× NBA All-Star (2000, 2001); NBA All-Rookie First Team (1996); Consensus first-team All-American (1995); First-team All-ACC (1995); ACC All-Freshman Team (1994); ACC tournament MVP (1994); No. 42 honored by North Carolina Tar Heels; McDonald's All-American Co-MVP (1993); 2× First-team Parade All-American (1992, 1993); As coach: SEC Coach of the Year (2023); Ben Jobe Award (2023); NBA D-League Coach of the Year (2017); NBA D-League champion (2017)

Career NBA statistics
- Points: 16,409 (16.9 ppg)
- Rebounds: 3,067 (3.2 rpg)
- Assists: 3,240 (3.3 apg)
- Stats at NBA.com
- Stats at Basketball Reference

Jerry Darnell Stackhouse (born November 5, 1974) is an American basketball coach and former player. Stackhouse played college basketball for the North Carolina Tar Heels and played 18 seasons in the National Basketball Association (NBA) and was a two-time NBA All-Star. He was the head coach of Raptors 905 and the Vanderbilt Commodores as well as an assistant coach for the Toronto Raptors, Memphis Grizzlies, and Golden State Warriors. Additionally, he has worked as an NBA TV analyst.

== Early career ==
Stackhouse was a premier player from the time he was a sophomore in high school. He was the state player of the year for North Carolina in 1991–92, leading Kinston High School to the state finals loss. His senior year, he played for Oak Hill Academy with future college teammates Rasheed Wallace & Jeff McInnis, where he helped them to an undefeated season. He was a two-time first team Parade All-America selection, and was Co–MVP of the McDonald's All-American Game. At the 1992 Nike Camp, he and Rasheed Wallace were considered to be the top players at the camp. There were some who considered Stackhouse the top prep player to come out of North Carolina since Michael Jordan.

Stackhouse attended the University of North Carolina at Chapel Hill, where he was a teammate of future NBA players Wallace, McInnis and Shammond Williams. In his sophomore season at UNC, Stackhouse led the team in scoring with 19.2 points per game and averaged 8.2 rebounds per contest. He led UNC to a Final Four appearance and was named as the National Player of the Year by Sports Illustrated and earned first-team All-America and All-ACC honors. While playing for the Tar Heels, he was coached by Dean Smith. Following the season, Stackhouse declared his eligibility for the 1995 NBA draft.

Although he left UNC after two years, he continued working on his degree and received his bachelor's degree in African American Studies in 1999.

== NBA career ==
=== NBA draft ===
Stackhouse was selected in the first round of the 1995 NBA draft with the third pick by the Philadelphia 76ers. At one time he was hyped as the "Next Jordan" since both players played at North Carolina, went #3 in the draft, were listed at 6'6", looked similar physically, and had similarly acrobatic games. Coincidentally, both had a taller power forward from UNC drafted immediately after them in the #4 spot, Sam Perkins in 1984, and Rasheed Wallace in 1995.

=== Philadelphia 76ers (1995–1997) ===
In his first season with the 76ers, Stackhouse led his team with a 19.2 points per game (PPG) average, and was named to the NBA's All-Rookie team. In the 1996–97 season, the 76ers also drafted Allen Iverson. Combined, the two posted 44.2 points per game for the Sixers. Stackhouse represented the 76ers in the 1996 NBA Slam Dunk Contest.

=== Detroit Pistons (1997–2002) ===
Midway through the 1997–98 season, Stackhouse was dealt to the Detroit Pistons with Eric Montross for Theo Ratliff, Aaron McKie and future considerations. By the 1999–2000 season, his second full season with the Pistons, Stackhouse was averaging 23.6 points per game. A year later, he had a career-high average of 29.8 points per game. In a late season victory over the Chicago Bulls, he set the Pistons' franchise record and the league's season high for points in a game with 57. In 2001 he led the NBA in total points scored, finishing 2nd in the PPG scoring title to his former 76er teammate, Allen Iverson. Stackhouse saw his final action as a Piston with Detroit's elimination in the second round of the 2001–02 NBA playoffs to the Boston Celtics.

=== Washington Wizards (2002–2004) ===
During the 2002 offseason, Stackhouse was traded to the Washington Wizards in a six-player deal, also involving Richard Hamilton.

In his first season with Washington (2002–03), Stackhouse led the Wizards in points and assists per game with 21.5 and 4.5 respectively. Stackhouse became the only teammate to average more points per game than Michael Jordan for an entire season (Jordan averaged 20.0 points per game in 2002-03 which was his last season in the NBA). Stackhouse missed most of the 2003–04 season while recovering from arthroscopic surgery on his right knee, playing in only 26 games.

In 2020 Stackhouse stated that he regretted playing with Jordan, feeling that plays being designed primarily for an NBA legend past his prime was stalling Stackhouse's All-Star momentum.

=== Dallas Mavericks (2004–2009) ===
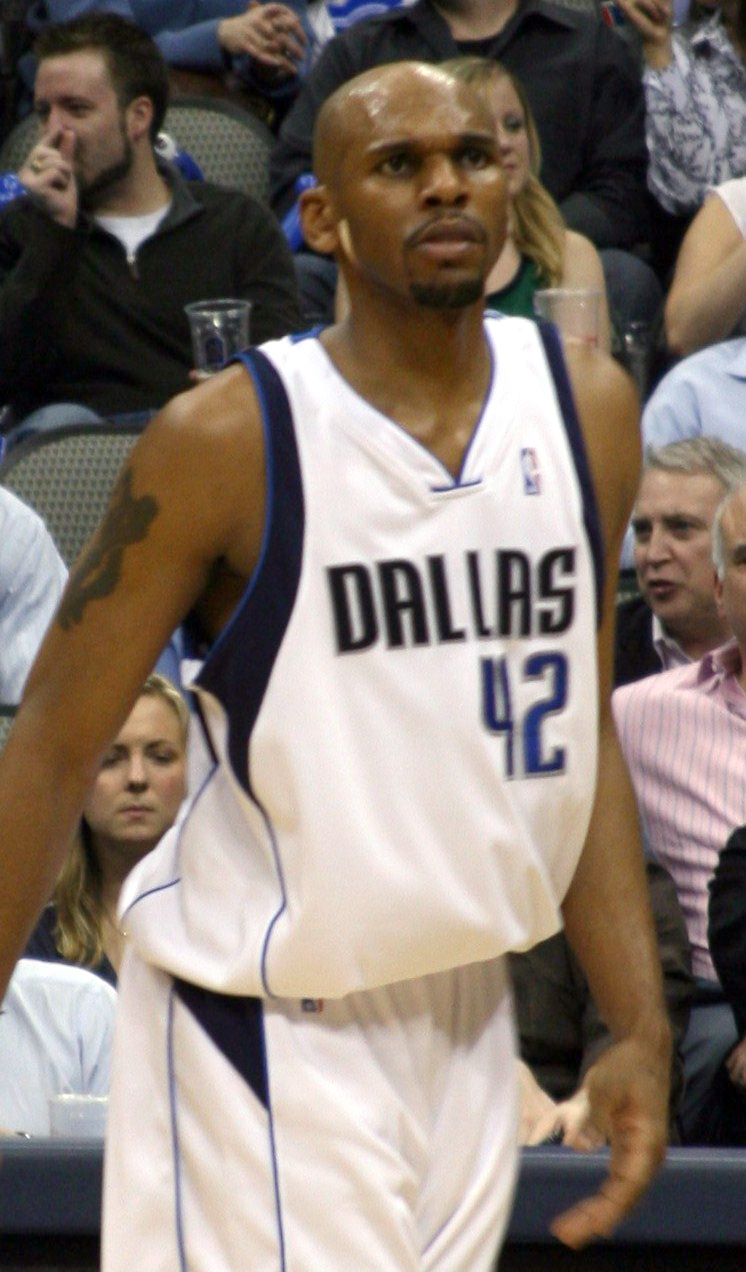
Stackhouse with the Mavericks in 2008

In the 2004 offseason, Stackhouse—along with Christian Laettner and the Wizards' first-round draft pick (Devin Harris)—was traded to the Dallas Mavericks in exchange for former Tar Heel and NBA All-Star Antawn Jamison. He did not play for 41 games during his first two seasons with Dallas due to groin and continued knee problems, and played mostly the role of sixth man. During the 2004–05 playoffs, Stackhouse began wearing pressure stockings during games to keep his legs warm, to aid his groin injury, and hold his thigh sleeves in place; the stockings also allowed for better blood flow to the legs. The practice quickly became a trend among NBA players, with Kobe Bryant, Tracy McGrady, Vince Carter, Dwyane Wade, LeBron James and others adopting pressure stockings the following season.

Stackhouse was still coming off the bench as the 6th man for the Dallas Mavericks during the 2005–06 NBA season. He was a significant factor in the NBA Finals series against the Miami Heat. The Mavericks suffered when Stackhouse was suspended for Game 5 for a flagrant foul on Shaquille O'Neal, and the Heat eventually won the series 4–2. Stackhouse was the third player from the Mavericks suspended during the 2006 playoffs.

=== Milwaukee Bucks (2010) ===
Stackhouse was traded to the Memphis Grizzlies on July 8, 2009, in a four-way trade. On the day after the trade, Stackhouse was waived by the Grizzlies. On January 17, 2010, the Milwaukee Bucks signed Stackhouse for the remainder of the 2009–10 season.

=== Miami Heat (2010) ===
On October 23, 2010, Stackhouse and the Miami Heat agreed to a contract.

On November 23, 2010, the Heat waived Stackhouse to make room for Erick Dampier who was signed to replace injured forward Udonis Haslem.

=== Atlanta Hawks (2011–2012) ===
On December 9, 2011, Stackhouse joined the Atlanta Hawks. Stackhouse was chosen to replace injured teammate Joe Johnson as Atlanta's representative in the Haier Shooting Stars Competition during NBA All-Star weekend.

=== Brooklyn Nets (2012–2013) ===
On July 11, 2012, Stackhouse made a verbal agreement to sign a one-year, $1.3 million deal with the Nets. Stackhouse has worn the number 42 in honor of Jackie Robinson, his favorite athlete, and became the first professional athlete to wear the number 42 in Brooklyn since Robinson. On November 26, 2012, the Nets played the New York Knicks for the first time since the Nets had moved to Brooklyn. Stackhouse played 22 minutes and scored 14 points, including a tiebreaking 3-pointer in overtime, and the Nets went on to win. On March 18, 2013, he scored 10 points against the Detroit Pistons, one of his former teams.

After the Nets' first-round playoff loss to the Chicago Bulls, Stackhouse announced his retirement.

== Broadcasting career ==
On November 15, 2013, it was announced that Stackhouse had joined Fox Sports Detroit as a Pistons analyst. He primarily provided studio analysis but also was the road color commentator for Fox Sports Detroit on select road trips. Stackhouse was also a college basketball analyst for the ACC Network and Fox Sports Detroit. By Joining Fox Sports Detroit, Stackhouse reunited with his former Pistons teammate Mateen Cleaves in the studio.

== Coaching career ==
=== Toronto Raptors ===
On June 29, 2015, he was hired to serve as an assistant coach by the Toronto Raptors. During his first season with the Raptors, he helped the team finish second in the Eastern Conference along with reaching the Eastern Conference Finals.

=== Raptors 905 ===
On September 9, 2016, the Raptors named him head coach for Raptors 905, the franchise's NBA Development League team. Stackhouse has aspirations of being an NBA head coach and told The Ringer that he hopes the D-League position will propel him to a head coaching job. Stackhouse led the 905 to a successful year during the 2016–17 season as the team was crowned champion of the NBA D-League. Stackhouse was named NBA D-League Coach of the Year in 2017.

=== Memphis Grizzlies ===
Stackhouse served as an assistant coach for the Memphis Grizzlies for the 2018–19 NBA season.

=== Vanderbilt ===
On April 5, 2019, Stackhouse was named the head coach of the Vanderbilt Commodores, signing a six-year contract.

In his first season, on January 18, 2020, Stackhouse's Commodores went 0-25 on 3-point shots, ending a streak of 1,080 consecutive games with at least one 3-point goal made. At that time, only three teams - Vanderbilt, UNLV, and Princeton - had made at least one 3-pointer in every game since its introduction in the 1986-1987 season. Stackhouse's response was to criticize the fans booing, saying "[they] were more concerned about the 3s than us really even getting baskets."

In 2022-23 he led the Commodores to a 22-15 record and was named SEC Coach of the Year. He was fired on March 14, 2024, after a disappointing 9–23 record in the 2024 season. Throughout his five seasons coaching the Commodores, he led the team to a 70–92 record and failed to make the NCAA Tournament.

=== Golden State Warriors ===
On September 27, 2024, Stackhouse was hired by the Golden State Warriors as an assistant coach under Steve Kerr. On May 14, 2026, it was reported that Stackhouse would be departing the Warriors.

== Personal life ==
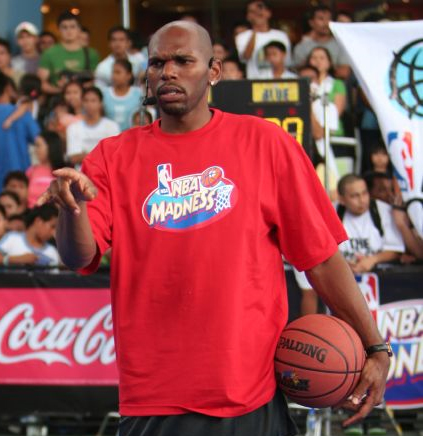
Stackhouse hosting a basketball event in the Philippines in 2007

Stackhouse is the younger brother of former CBA player and Sacramento Kings and Boston Celtics forward Tony Dawson, and he is the uncle of former Wake Forest University guard Craig Dawson.

Stackhouse has performed the U.S. national anthem before Mavericks home games and during the Bucks' 2010 and the Nets' 2013 playoff appearances. Although formerly a Pescatarian, Stackhouse is now back to eating meat.

In 2017, Stackhouse completed the Harvard Business School executive education program on the Business of Entertainment, Media, and Sports.

== Achievements ==
- 2× NBA free throw scoring leaders: (2000, 2001)
- Sports Illustrated Player of the Year (1995)
- Had the highest point total, 2,380, for the 2000–01 NBA season, but was second in scoring average, 29.8.
- Became the 106th NBA player to score 15,000 career points, only one game after teammate Dirk Nowitzki surpassed 15,000 points.
- 2017 NBA D-League Coach of the Year

== Career statistics ==
Legend
GP	Games played	GS	Games started	MPG	Minutes per game
FG%	Field goal percentage	3P%	3-point field goal percentage	FT%	Free throw percentage
RPG	Rebounds per game	APG	Assists per game	SPG	Steals per game
BPG	Blocks per game	PPG	Points per game	**Bold**	Career high
*	Led the league

=== NBA ===
==== Regular season ====
Year	Team	GP	GS	MPG	FG%	3P%	FT%	RPG	APG	SPG	BPG	PPG
1995–96	Philadelphia	72	71	37.5	.414	.318	.747	3.7	3.9	1.1	**1.1**	19.2
1996–97	Philadelphia	81	81	39.1	.407	.298	.766	**4.2**	3.1	1.1	.8	20.7
1997–98	Philadelphia	22	22	34.0	**.452**	.348	.802	3.5	3.0	**1.4**	1.0	16.0
1997–98	Detroit	57	15	31.5	.428	.208	.782	3.3	3.1	1.0	.7	15.7
1998–99	Detroit	42	9	28.3	.371	.278	.850	2.5	2.8	.8	.5	14.5
1999–00	Detroit	**82**	**82***	38.4	.428	.288	.815	3.8	4.5	1.3	.4	23.6
2000–01	Detroit	80	80	**40.2**	.402	.351	.822	3.9	5.1	1.2	.7	**29.8**
2001–02	Detroit	76	76	35.3	.397	.287	.858	4.1	**5.3**	1.0	.5	21.4
2002–03	Washington	70	70	39.2	.409	.290	.878	3.7	4.5	.9	.4	21.5
2003–04	Washington	26	17	29.8	.399	.354	.806	3.6	4.0	.9	.1	13.9
2004–05	Dallas	56	7	28.9	.414	.267	.849	3.3	2.3	.9	.2	14.9
2005–06	Dallas	55	11	27.7	.401	.277	.882	2.8	2.9	.7	.2	13.0
2006–07	Dallas	67	8	24.1	.428	**.383**	.847	2.2	2.8	.8	.1	12.0
2007–08	Dallas	58	13	24.3	.405	.326	.892	2.3	2.5	.5	.2	10.7
2008–09	Dallas	10	1	16.2	.267	.158	**1.000**	1.7	1.2	.4	.1	4.2
2009–10	Milwaukee	42	0	20.4	.408	.346	.797	2.4	1.7	.5	.2	8.5
2010–11	Miami	7	1	7.1	.250	.250	.714	1.0	.4	.0	.3	1.7
2011–12	Atlanta	30	0	9.1	.370	.342	.913	.8	.5	.3	.1	3.6
2012–13	Brooklyn	37	0	14.7	.384	.337	.870	.9	.9	.2	.1	4.9
Career		970	564	31.2	.409	.309	.822	3.2	3.3	.9	.5	16.9
All-Star		2	0	14.5	.467	1.000	.000	1.5	2.0	.0	.0	7.5

==== Playoffs ====
Year	Team	GP	GS	MPG	FG%	3P%	FT%	RPG	APG	SPG	BPG	PPG
1999	Detroit	5	0	24.8	.391	.250	.857	1.6	1.2	.4	.2	10.0
2000	Detroit	3	3	**40.0**	**.407**	**.429**	.742	4.0	3.3	**.7**	.0	**24.7**
2002	Detroit	10	**10**	36.1	.321	.340	.825	**4.3**	**4.3**	.6	**.6**	17.6
2005	Dallas	13	0	31.0	.386	.400	.864	4.1	2.3	.6	.2	16.1
2006	Dallas	**22**	1	32.3	.402	.338	.784	2.8	2.5	.5	.3	13.7
2007	Dallas	6	0	28.2	.348	.355	.879	3.7	2.5	**.7**	.2	14.3
2008	Dallas	5	2	20.4	.316	.167	**1.000**	3.2	1.2	.2	.0	6.2
2010	Milwaukee	7	0	20.6	.326	.333	.900	1.7	1.1	**.7**	.1	7.3
2013	Brooklyn	4	0	7.0	.100	.000	.750	1.0	.0	.0	.0	1.3
Career		75	16	28.8	.369	.332	.829	3.1	2.3	.5	.2	13.1

=== College ===
Year	Team	GP	GS	MPG	FG%	3P%	FT%	RPG	APG	SPG	BPG	PPG
1993–94	North Carolina	**35**	1	21.0	.466	.100	**.732**	5.0	2.0	1.2	.5	12.2
1994–95	North Carolina	34	**33**	**34.4**	**.517**	**.411**	.712	**8.2**	**2.7**	**1.5**	**1.7**	**19.2**
Career		69	34	27.6	.496	.355	.720	6.6	2.3	1.3	1.1	15.7

== Head coaching record ==
=== College ===
Record table
Season	Team	Overall	Conference	Standing	Postseason
Vanderbilt Commodores (Southeastern Conference) (2019–2024)
2019–20	Vanderbilt	11–21	3–15	14th	
2020–21	Vanderbilt	9–16	3–13	13th	
2021–22	Vanderbilt	19–17	7–11	11th	NIT Quarterfinals
2022–23	Vanderbilt	22–15	11–7	T–4th	NIT Quarterfinals
2023–24	Vanderbilt	9–23	4–14	13th	
Vanderbilt:		70–92 (.432)	28–60 (.318)		
Total:		70–92 (.432)			
National champion Postseason invitational champion Conference regular season champion Conference regular season and conference tournament champion Division regular season champion Division regular season and conference tournament champion Conference tournament champion

== See also ==
- List of National Basketball Association career turnovers leaders
