= Rasheed Wallace =

American former basketball player (born 1974)

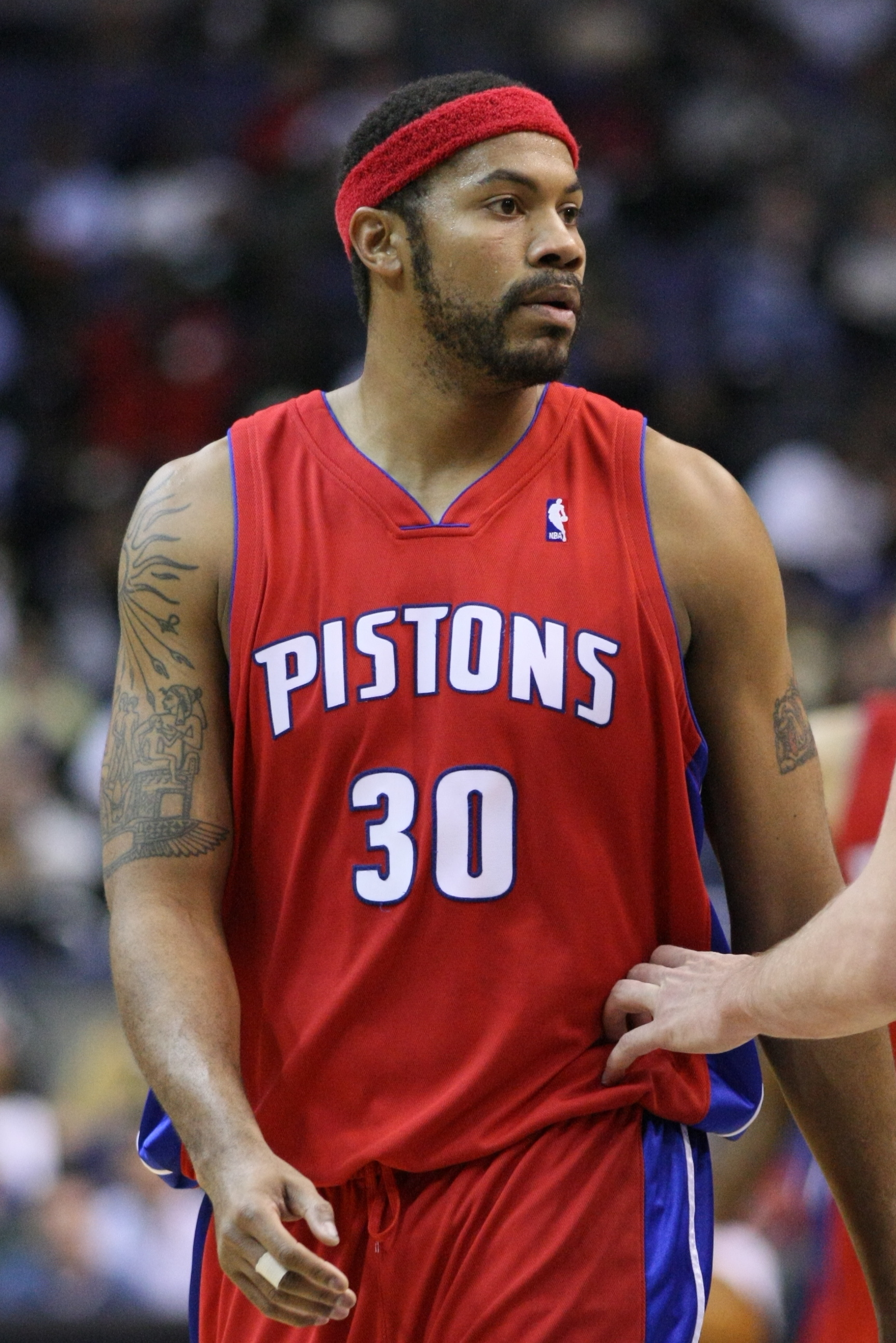
- Wallace with the Detroit Pistons in 2008

Personal information
- Born: September 17, 1974 (age 52) Philadelphia, Pennsylvania, U.S.
- Listed height: 6 ft 11 in (2.11 m)
- Listed weight: 230 lb (104 kg)

Career information
- High school: Simon Gratz (Philadelphia, Pennsylvania)
- College: North Carolina (1993–1995)
- NBA draft: 1995: 1st round, 4th overall pick
- Drafted by: Washington Bullets
- Playing career: 1995–2010, 2012–2013
- Position: Power forward / center
- Number: 30, 36
- Coaching career: 2013–2014, 2019–present

Career history

Playing
- 1995–1996: Washington Bullets
- 1996–2004: Portland Trail Blazers
- 2004: Atlanta Hawks
- 2004–2009: Detroit Pistons
- 2009–2010: Boston Celtics
- 2012–2013: New York Knicks

Career highlights
- NBA champion (2004); 4× NBA All-Star (2000, 2001, 2006, 2008); NBA All-Rookie Second Team (1996); Consensus second-team All-American (1995); First-team All-ACC (1995); ACC All-Freshman team (1994); No. 30 honored by North Carolina Tar Heels; National high school player of the year (1993); McDonald's All-American (1993); 2× First-team Parade All-American (1992, 1993)

Career NBA statistics
- Points: 16,006 (14.4 ppg)
- Rebounds: 7,404 (6.7 rpg)
- Blocks: 1,460 (1.3 bpg)
- Stats at NBA.com
- Stats at Basketball Reference

Rasheed Abdul Wallace (born September 17, 1974) is an American basketball coach and former professional player. He played college basketball for the North Carolina Tar Heels and played for six teams during his 16-year career in the National Basketball Association (NBA). A four-time NBA All-Star, Wallace won an NBA championship as a member of the Detroit Pistons in 2004.

Originally selected by the Washington Bullets (now known as the Washington Wizards) as the fourth pick in the 1995 NBA draft, Wallace was named to the All-Rookie second team following his first season. He was then traded to the Portland Trail Blazers after the season. He was a key member of the Trail Blazers team that made it to the Western Conference Finals in 1999 and 2000, and he was an NBA All-Star in 2000 and 2001. Wallace averaged a career best 19.4 points per game in 2002 for the Trail Blazers.

During the 2003–04 season Portland traded him to the Atlanta Hawks where he played one game before he was traded to the Detroit Pistons. With the Pistons, Wallace won the NBA championship in 2004 and reached the NBA Finals in the following season before losing to the San Antonio Spurs in seven games. Individually, Wallace was an NBA All-Star in 2006 and 2008. After the 2008–09 season, Wallace left the Pistons as a free agent and signed with the Boston Celtics, where he played until retiring in 2010. He returned to sign a one-year deal to play for the New York Knicks in 2012. On April 17, 2013, Wallace announced his second retirement.

Wallace holds the single-season record for technical fouls. In the 2000–01 season, Wallace received 41 technical fouls over 80 games. He has received the third-most career technical fouls with 317. Wallace is in the Class of 2025 for the Michigan Sports Hall of Fame and enshrined on December 19, 2025 in Detroit.

== Early life and education ==
Wallace was born and raised in a single-mother household in the Germantown neighborhood of Philadelphia along with his two brothers Malcolm and Muhammed. His mother worked in the Pennsylvania Department of Welfare.

Wallace began his basketball career while attending Simon Gratz High School. He was named USA Today's High School Player of the Year after his senior season and was selected first-team All America by Basketball Times. Wallace was also a two-time Parade All-American first teamer. Despite playing just 19 minutes per game, Wallace averaged 16 points, 15 rebounds and seven blocks his senior year. In addition to basketball, Wallace played baseball, ran track and high jumped as a teenager. He played in the Roundball Classic, scoring 30 points in a losing effort. Wallace, along with Randy Livingston and Jerry Stackhouse, were considered the top three players in the 1993 class.

== College career ==
Tar Heels coach Dean Smith recruited Wallace to the University of North Carolina at Chapel Hill for his college years. Smith was a revered mentor both to Wallace and Wallace's eventual Detroit coach Larry Brown. Wallace has indicated that this North Carolina bond with Brown helped him adjust quickly to the Pistons system. During his two years at North Carolina, Wallace had success in the national spotlight. He was named a second-team All-American by the AP his second year at UNC.

Wallace and fellow future NBA player Jerry Stackhouse helped lead the Tar Heels to the NCAA Final Four in 1995. He left North Carolina to enter the 1995 NBA draft after his sophomore season, being selected with the fourth pick overall by the Washington Bullets.

== Professional career ==
=== Washington Bullets (1995–1996) ===
As a rookie with the Bullets, Wallace played in 65 games, of which he started 51 for the injured Chris Webber. Wallace was selected to the rookie team for the All-Star Weekend. Late that year, he fractured his left thumb during a game against Orlando and did not return until the following season. En route to being named to the NBA All-Rookie Second Team, Wallace averaged 10.1 points, 4.7 rebounds, and 3.4 assists. In total, Wallace scored 655 points and played 1,788 minutes during his rookie season in Washington.

=== Portland Trail Blazers (1996–2004) ===
After the season, Wallace was traded to the Portland Trail Blazers, along with Mitchell Butler in exchange for Rod Strickland and Harvey Grant. This move proved beneficial for both sides: Strickland averaged 17.2 ppg and 8.9 apg after the trade, helping the Bullets make the playoffs in 1997 for the first time in eight seasons, and upped those stats to 17.8 ppg and a league-leading 10.5 apg the following year.

Meanwhile, Wallace ranked third in the league in field goal percentage. However, just as his season was gaining momentum, Wallace again broke his left thumb and was forced to miss the next month of the season, but he returned in time for a strong performance in the first round playoff series against the Los Angeles Lakers, which the Trail Blazers lost.

Next season, Wallace signed a long-term contract to stay with the Trail Blazers. He began extending himself into the community more than ever, most notably with his Rasheed Wallace Foundation, but his career suffered from numerous missteps on and off the court. He set an NBA record with 38 technical fouls for the season. However, he would be fifth in the league in field goal percentage. The following year, he broke his own record with 40 technicals. Wallace was also suspended by the NBA for seven games for threatening then-referee Tim Donaghy on an arena loading dock after a home game in 2003. That was the league's longest suspension for an offense that did not involve violence or substance abuse. Wallace was far from the only perceived trouble maker on Portland at the time, his teammates, Bonzi Wells, Damon Stoudamire, and Zach Randolph for instance, were also frequently criticized by media and fans for off-court outbursts and legal incidents, leading to the team often being referred to as The Jail Blazers.

Wallace was named an NBA All-Star in 2000 and 2001. On February 20, 2001, he scored a career best 42 points in a 104–94 victory over the Denver Nuggets. In the postseason, Wallace led the Trail Blazers to the Western Conference Finals back to back in 1999 and 2000, losing to the San Antonio Spurs and the Los Angeles Lakers, respectively. Both teams would go on to win the NBA Finals. The 2000 series against the Lakers was alleged by some to have one-sided officiating in favor of the Lakers, with the Trail Blazers squandering a 15-point lead going into the fourth quarter of Game 7. Two years later, during the 2002 NBA Playoffs, despite Wallace posting career high postseason averages of 25.3 points and 12.3 rebounds per game, Portland was again eliminated by the eventual champion Lakers.

=== Atlanta Hawks (2004) ===
On February 9, 2004, just before the 2004 NBA All-Star Game, Wallace was traded to the Atlanta Hawks along with Wesley Person for Shareef Abdur-Rahim, Theo Ratliff and Dan Dickau. Wallace played only one game for the Hawks, on February 18, scoring 20 points through three quarters. He also had six rebounds, five blocks, two assists and a steal in a close loss on the road against the New Jersey Nets, though he did not score in the fourth quarter.

=== Detroit Pistons (2004–2009) ===
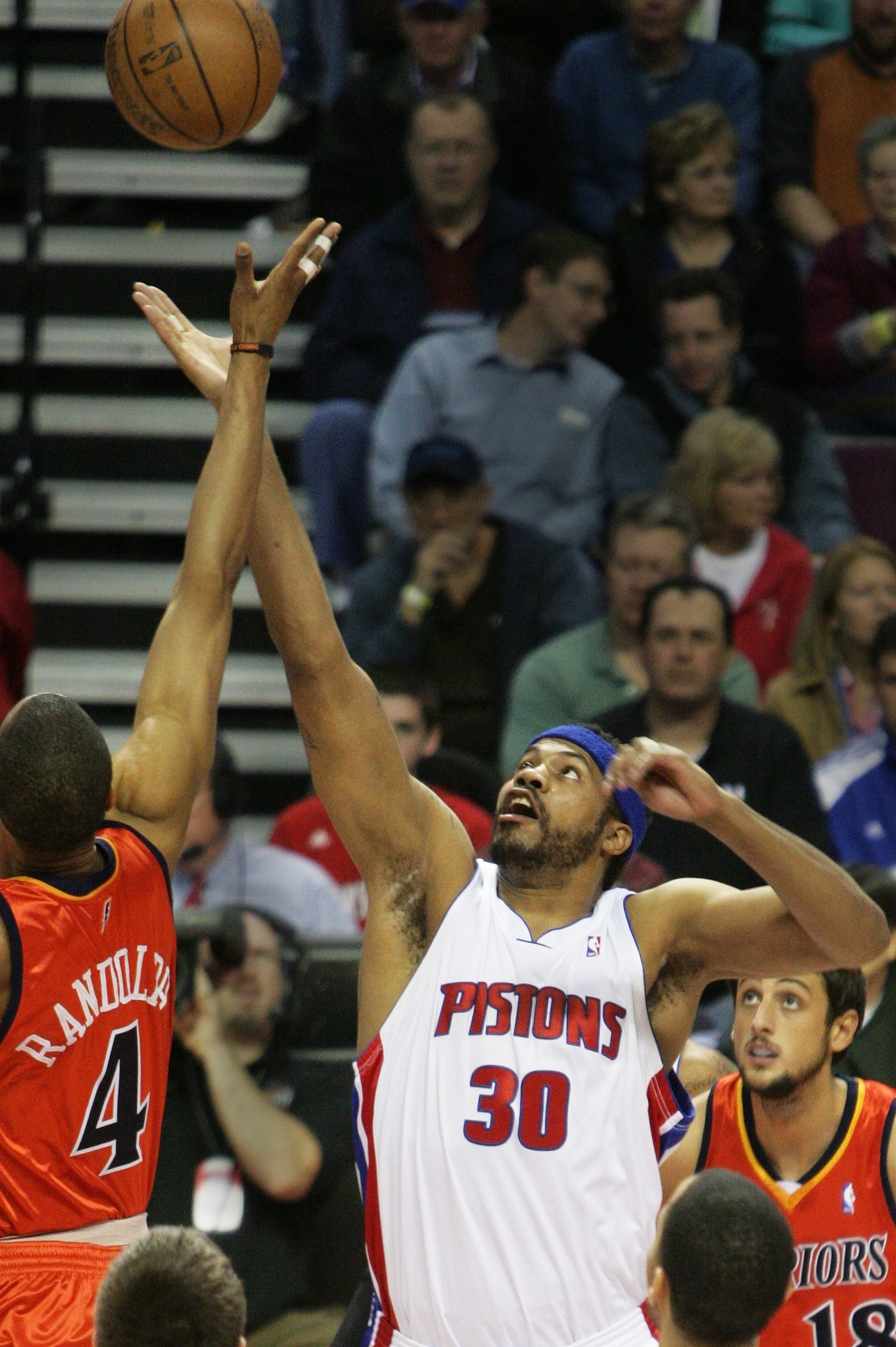
Wallace in a game against the Golden State Warriors

==== Championship and consecutive Finals appearances (2004–2005) ====
Wallace was again traded, in a deal that saw him go from the Hawks along with guard Mike James from the Celtics to the Detroit Pistons. In turn, Detroit sent guards Chucky Atkins, Lindsey Hunter and a first-round draft pick to Boston and guard Bob Sura, center Željko Rebrača and a first-round draft pick to Atlanta. Boston also sent forward Chris Mills to Atlanta to complete the deal.

On February 23, 2004, in his first road game with the Pistons, Wallace recorded 10 points, 11 rebounds and 4 blocks in a 76–66 win over the Philadelphia 76ers.

After falling behind against the Indiana Pacers in the 2004 Eastern Conference Finals, he stated boldly in an interview that, "We will win Game 2," a promise he helped fulfill.

In Game 4 of the 2004 NBA Finals, Wallace recorded 26 points, 13 rebounds and 2 assists in an 88–80 win over the Los Angeles Lakers. The Detroit Pistons were up 3–1 in that occasion. Wallace helped the Pistons win an unexpected NBA title, beating the heavily favored Lakers four games to one. After the championship season, he paid for replica WWE World Heavyweight Championship belts to be made for each of his teammates and presented them as gifts when the 2004–05 regular season started.

In the off-season following the Pistons' championship win, Wallace signed a five-year, $57 million contract to remain with Detroit. He also changed the number of his jersey from #30 to #36.

Throughout the 2004–05 season, Wallace often carried the belt into his locker before games to inspire the Pistons' title defense. However, early in the season, the Pistons had a fight with the Indiana Pacers, which resulted into several suspensions for players putting the team into a temporary setback.

Several months later, he had several notable moments in the playoffs. After the second-round elimination of the Pacers, Wallace played his best series of the postseason in the Eastern Conference finals against the top-seeded Miami Heat. After falling behind again, he again "guaranteed success". He shot a 50% field goal percentage and averaged 14.5 points per game in the series' seven games, and saved his hottest-shooting night to help the Pistons beat the Heat 88–82 in Game 7 on the road in Miami. Against the San Antonio Spurs in the NBA Finals, Wallace was criticized for leaving Robert Horry open for the game-winning three-pointer in Game 5. Wallace's defense and clutch shooting helped the Pistons to split the series 3–3, but in the final game, the Pistons lost 81–74.

==== All-Star appearances and final years in Detroit (2005–2009) ====
In the 2005–06 season, he helped lead them to a 64–18 record, and the top seed in the Eastern Conference for the playoffs. The Pistons beat the Milwaukee Bucks, 4–1 in the first round and then beat the Cleveland Cavaliers 4–3 in the second round of the playoffs. In the Eastern Conference Finals, the Pistons played the Heat in a rematch of the previous year's Conference Finals. The Pistons lost in six games to the Miami Heat, who went on to capture their first NBA title.

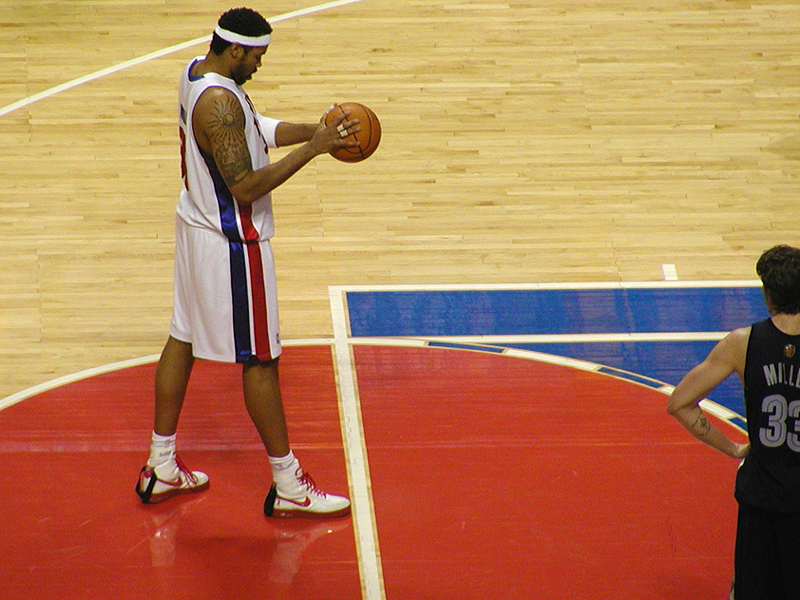
Wallace preparing to take a free-throw

On March 26, 2007, in a game against the Denver Nuggets, Wallace threw up a 60-foot shot off a stolen inbound pass with 1.5 seconds remaining and banked it in from just behind halfcourt to force overtime letting out a huge roar from what was left of the Palace crowd. The Pistons went on to win the game, 113–109.

On June 2, 2007, Wallace fouled out of Game 6 of the Eastern Conference Finals after committing a foul on LeBron James and then received two technical fouls, resulting in an automatic ejection, for arguing with a referee.

Prior to the 2007–08 NBA season, the Pistons would not re-sign Chris Webber, and putting Antonio McDyess as a starting power forward, put Wallace at center. On February 10, 2008, it was announced that Wallace would be replacing Boston Celtics' injured forward Kevin Garnett in the 2008 NBA All-Star Game in New Orleans. The decision was made by NBA commissioner David Stern. This was Wallace's fourth All-Star appearance.

In the 2008 Eastern Conference Finals, the Pistons played Garnett and the Celtics. This marked the sixth consecutive time that the Pistons had made it to this point, and five times they had gotten there with Wallace in the lineup. Still, Detroit lost a third consecutive year in the Conference Finals, losing to Boston 4–2 as Wallace played poorly. After the game, Wallace reportedly told reporters, without taking any questions, "It's over, man", perhaps indicating that Pistons' General Manager Joe Dumars would break up the core of the team following the defeat. He changed his number from 36 back to his original 30, perhaps to change his and the team's fortunes, but sure enough, Dumars did indeed break up the core: at the beginning of the 2008–09 season, Dumars traded longtime starting point guard and 2004 Finals MVP Chauncey Billups to Denver. It was to be Wallace's last year with the team; after the season came to a close, Wallace and the Pistons decided to part ways.

=== Boston Celtics (2009–2010) ===
Wallace signed a three-year contract with the Boston Celtics on July 8, 2009. During the regular season, Wallace struggled, averaging career lows in points per game and rebounds per game in addition to shooting only 28% on three-pointers and 40% from the field. The Celtics reached the NBA Finals in 2010 but lost the series to the Los Angeles Lakers four games to three. In Game 6 of the Finals, the Celtics' starting center Kendrick Perkins injured his right knee, so Wallace started Game 7. Wallace scored 11 points and was 5 of 11 from the field in the loss. Wallace's agent Bill Strickland announced on June 25, 2010, that Wallace would likely retire from the NBA, which was made official on August 10, following the buyout of his contract by the Celtics.

=== New York Knicks (2012–2013) ===
On October 3, 2012, Wallace came out of retirement, and signed with the New York Knicks.

On February 27, 2013, Wallace announced that he had a broken left foot and was expected to miss eight weeks. He was scheduled for surgery. He returned for a final game on April 15, 2013, playing three minutes off the bench. On April 17, 2013, after a short return, Wallace announced his second retirement.

== Coaching career ==
=== Detroit Pistons ===
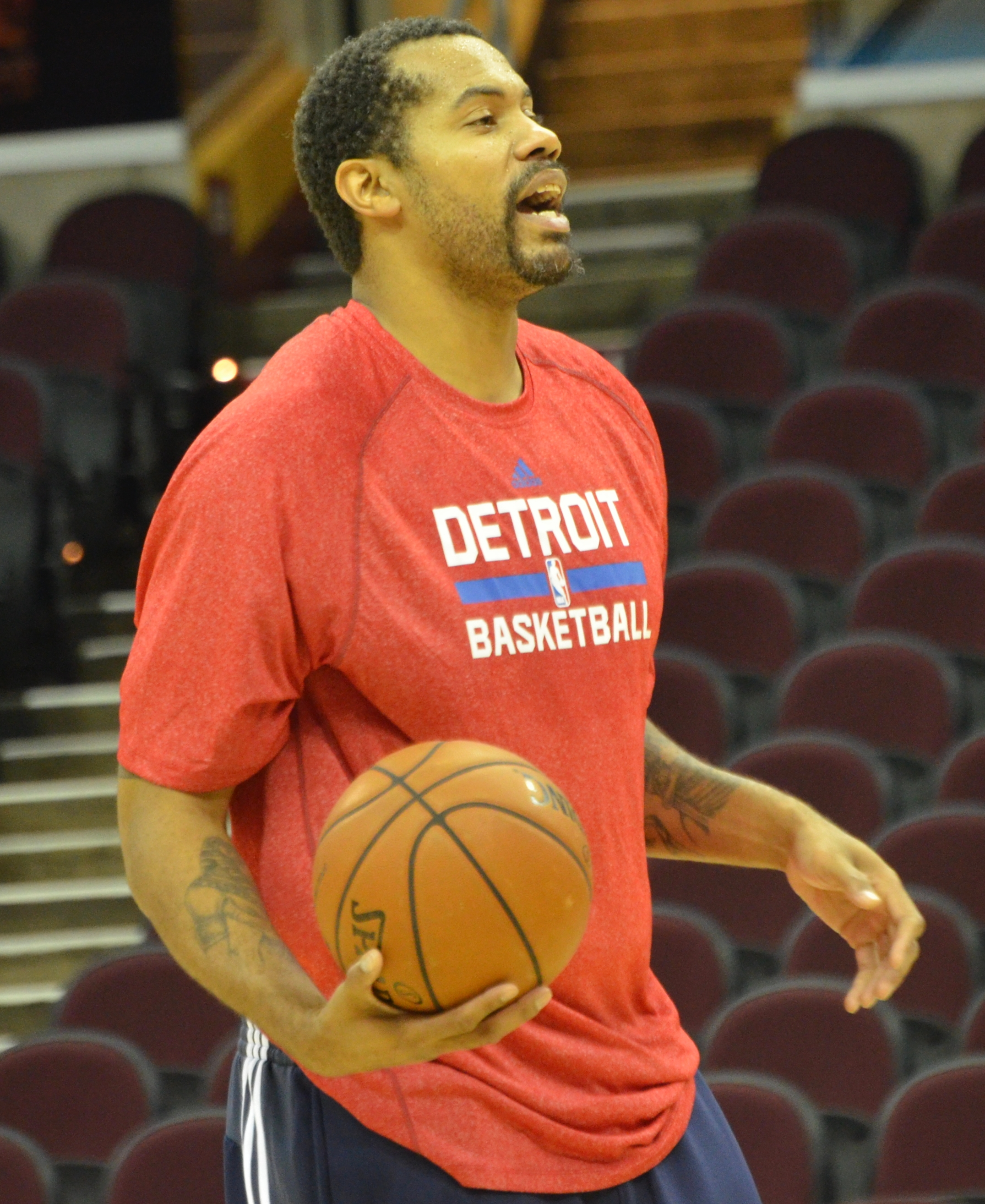
Wallace as an assistant coach for the Pistons in 2013

In July 2013, Wallace joined the Detroit Pistons staff as an assistant coach after signing a two-year contract with the team. He worked for the Pistons for the 2013–14 season, but was not rehired to the staff of new coach Stan Van Gundy following that season.

=== Jordan High School ===
On March 8, 2019, Wallace was introduced as the new boys varsity basketball head coach at Charles E. Jordan High School in Durham, North Carolina.

=== Memphis Tigers ===
On August 18, 2021, Wallace agreed to become an assistant coach at Memphis on Penny Hardaway's staff roster. He joined his former head coach in Detroit and Hall of Fame coach Larry Brown on the Tigers. On January 13, 2022, it was announced that Wallace would not serve an in-person role but would finish the season working remotely.

== On-court moments ==
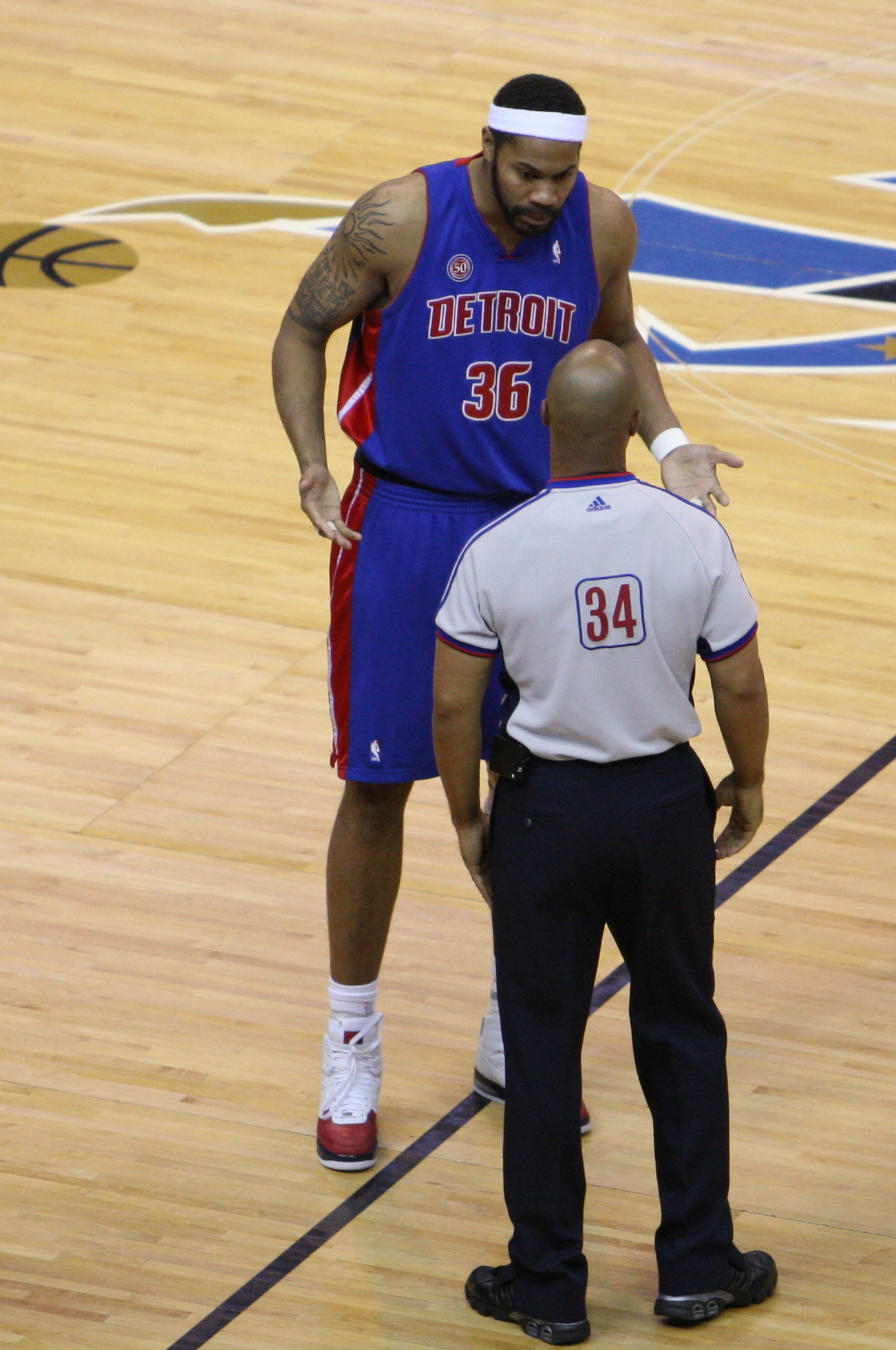
Wallace arguing with a referee, 2008

Wallace was known for his intensity and expressive personality, resulting in frequent confrontations with opponents and officials (often leading to technical fouls and ejections) but also moments of humor. Wallace holds the league records for most technical fouls in a season, and most ejections in a season; he also holds the league record for most career ejections with 29. During the 2008 Playoffs, Wallace went on an expletive-laced tirade following Game 5 of the Eastern Conference Finals against the Boston Celtics in which he lashed out at the officiating.

Wallace popularized the phrase "Ball don't lie", used when a player on the opposing team misses a free throw after a contentious call by the referees. One notable incident occurred in a December 2, 2012 game against the Phoenix Suns. After Wallace pushed Luis Scola and received a technical foul, Goran Dragić missed the technical free throw, to which Wallace responded by saying "Ball don't lie." Wallace then received a second technical, leading to his ejection. He played 1:25 before his ejection.

During the 2010 NBA Playoffs Wallace, a native of Philadelphia and Flyers fan, frequently wore hats and other articles of clothing with the Philadelphia Flyers logo during Boston Celtics press conferences and interviews. This caused a stir with fans throughout the Boston area as the Flyers were playing the Boston Bruins in the NHL Playoffs at the time. Criticism by Bostonians only grew after the Flyers' comeback from a 0–3 game deficit to win the series 4–3. Wallace nevertheless continued to wear his Flyers gear in public.

== Personal life ==
Wallace has three children with his former wife Fatima Sanders. He is a follower of Islam. His nephew, Quadir Welton, is a professional basketball player.

Wallace roots for his hometown Philadelphia Flyers (NHL) and Phillies (MLB), but not the Eagles of the NFL. Instead, he is a longtime fan of the Kansas City Chiefs.

=== Activism and philanthropy ===
Wallace has been one of the biggest voices and helping hands in the Flint water crisis. He personally delivered water door to door in Flint since the summer of 2016; he wrote a letter (a short article) in the Players Tribune to raise awareness. He also appeared on the television show Area 21 to talk about the Crisis. Wallace's efforts inspired Stephen Jackson, Rachel Nichols, Kyle Kuzma, and other celebrities to help in Flint.

== NBA career statistics ==
Legend
GP	Games played	GS	Games started	MPG	Minutes per game
FG%	Field goal percentage	3P%	3-point field goal percentage	FT%	Free throw percentage
RPG	Rebounds per game	APG	Assists per game	SPG	Steals per game
BPG	Blocks per game	PPG	Points per game	**Bold**	Career high
†	Won an NBA championship

=== Regular season ===
Year	Team	GP	GS	MPG	FG%	3P%	FT%	RPG	APG	SPG	BPG	PPG
1995–96	Washington	65	51	27.5	.487	.329	.650	4.7	1.3	.6	.8	10.1
1996–97	Portland	62	56	30.5	**.558**	.273	.638	6.8	1.2	.8	1.0	15.1
1997–98	Portland	77	77	37.6	.533	.205	.662	6.2	2.5	1.0	1.1	14.6
1998–99	Portland	49	18	28.9	.508	**.419**	.732	4.9	1.2	1.0	1.1	12.8
1999–00	Portland	**81**	77	35.1	.519	.160	.704	7.0	1.8	1.1	1.3	16.4
2000–01	Portland	77	75	38.2	.501	.321	.766	7.8	**2.8**	1.2	1.8	19.2
2001–02	Portland	79	79	37.5	.469	.360	.734	**8.2**	1.9	**1.3**	1.3	19.3
2002–03	Portland	74	74	36.3	.471	.358	.735	7.4	2.1	.9	1.0	18.1
2003–04	Portland	45	44	37.2	.442	.341	.742	6.6	2.5	.8	1.6	17.0
2003–04	Atlanta	1	1	**42.0**	.333	.167	**1.000**	6.0	2.0	1.0	**5.0**	**20.0**
2003–04	Detroit†	22	21	30.6	.431	.319	.704	7.0	1.8	1.1	2.0	13.7
2004–05	Detroit	79	79	34.0	.440	.318	.697	**8.2**	1.8	.8	1.5	14.5
2005–06	Detroit	80	**80**	34.8	.430	.357	.743	6.8	2.3	1.0	1.6	15.1
2006–07	Detroit	75	72	32.3	.423	.351	.788	7.2	1.7	1.0	1.6	12.3
2007–08	Detroit	77	76	30.5	.432	.356	.767	6.6	1.8	1.2	1.7	12.7
2008–09	Detroit	66	63	32.2	.419	.354	.772	7.4	1.4	.9	1.3	12.0
2009–10	Boston	79	13	22.5	.409	.283	.768	4.1	1.0	1.0	.9	9.0
2012–13	New York	21	0	14.1	.387	.319	.700	4.0	.3	.6	.7	7.0
Career		1109	956	32.7	.467	.336	.721	6.7	1.8	1.0	1.3	14.4
All-Star		4	0	19.3	.250	.100	.750	3.8	.5	1.0	.8	4.0

=== Playoffs ===
Year	Team	GP	GS	MPG	FG%	3P%	FT%	RPG	APG	SPG	BPG	PPG
1997	Portland	4	4	37.0	**.589**	.400	.550	6.0	1.5	0.5	0.5	19.8
1998	Portland	4	4	39.3	.489	**.800**	.500	4.8	**2.8**	0.5	0.5	14.5
1999	Portland	13	13	36.0	.514	.111	.724	4.8	1.5	**1.5**	0.8	14.8
2000	Portland	16	16	37.8	.489	.615	.773	6.4	1.8	0.9	1.3	17.9
2001	Portland	3	3	**42.7**	.373	.364	.571	8.0	2.3	0.3	1.0	16.7
2002	Portland	3	3	41.7	.406	.412	.813	**12.3**	1.7	0.7	0.7	**25.3**
2003	Portland	7	7	37.1	.454	.400	.714	5.1	2.6	0.6	0.7	17.4
2004†	Detroit	23	23	34.9	.413	.243	.767	7.8	1.6	0.6	**2.0**	13.0
2005	Detroit	**25**	**25**	33.0	.439	.337	.741	6.9	1.3	1.0	1.8	13.6
2006	Detroit	18	18	34.9	.430	.405	.527	6.3	1.8	0.6	0.8	14.1
2007	Detroit	16	16	35.8	.437	.347	**.842**	7.7	1.8	1.2	1.8	14.3
2008	Detroit	17	17	34.4	.424	.320	.744	6.4	1.6	1.1	1.9	13.2
2009	Detroit	4	4	30.5	.367	.500	.000	6.3	0.8	0.5	0.3	6.5
2010	Boston	24	1	17.1	.416	.345	.828	3.0	0.4	0.4	0.6	6.1
Career		177	154	33.0	.444	.352	.717	6.2	1.5	0.8	1.3	13.5

== See also ==
- List of NBA career blocks leaders
- List of NBA career personal fouls leaders
- List of NBA career playoff blocks leaders
- List of NBA career playoff games played leaders
- List of people banned or suspended by the NBA
