= Randy Livingston =

American basketball player and coach (born 1975)

Personal information
- Born: April 2, 1975 (age 51) New Orleans, Louisiana, U.S.
- Listed height: 6 ft 4 in (1.93 m)
- Listed weight: 209 lb (95 kg)

Career information
- High school: Isidore Newman (New Orleans, Louisiana)
- College: LSU (1994–1996)
- NBA draft: 1996: 2nd round, 42nd overall pick
- Drafted by: Houston Rockets
- Playing career: 1996–2008
- Position: Point guard
- Number: 3, 7, 2, 9, 1, 14
- Coaching career: 2010–present

Career history

Playing
- 1996–1997: Houston Rockets
- 1997–1998: Atlanta Hawks
- 1998–1999: Sioux Falls Skyforce
- 1999–2000: Phoenix Suns
- 2000: Golden State Warriors
- 2000–2001: Idaho Stampede
- 2001: Gary Steelheads
- 2002: Sioux Falls Skyforce
- 2002: Seattle SuperSonics
- 2003: New Orleans Hornets
- 2003–2004: Idaho Stampede
- 2004: Los Angeles Clippers
- 2004–2005: Sioux Falls Skyforce
- 2005: Utah Jazz
- 2005–2006: Galatasaray
- 2006–2008: Idaho Stampede
- 2006: Chicago Bulls
- 2007: Seattle SuperSonics

Coaching
- 2010–2012: Idaho Stampede
- 2019–present: Isidore Newman School

Career highlights
- NBA D-League champion (2008); NBA D-League Most Valuable Player (2007); 2× All-NBA D-League First Team (2007, 2008); CBA All-Star (2005); All-CBA First Team (2005); 3× All-CBA Second Team (1999, 2002, 2004); 2× First-team Parade All-American (1992, 1993); McDonald's All-American (1993); Naismith Prep Player of the Year (1993); Gatorade National Player of the Year (1993)
- Stats at NBA.com
- Stats at Basketball Reference

Randy Livingston (born April 2, 1975) is an American former professional basketball player and current coach. He played parts of eleven seasons in the National Basketball Association (NBA) for nine different teams. The national high school player in the country in 1993, Livingston's college and professional careers were marked by a series of injuries that hampered his play.

== Early life ==
Livingston attended New Orleans' Isidore Newman School along with standout quarterback Peyton Manning, where he was named the High School co-player of the year in 1992 (with Jason Kidd) and 1993 (with Rasheed Wallace). Livingston also played in the McDonald's All-American Game and Magic's Roundball Classic. He was ranked as the #1 player in the 1993 class, over Rasheed Wallace and Jerry Stackhouse. Isidore Newman School retired Livingston's #50 jersey in 2013.

== Professional basketball career ==
After high school, Livingston attended Louisiana State University but only appeared in 32 games over two seasons because of knee problems. He was drafted by the Houston Rockets in the second round (42nd pick overall) of the 1996 NBA draft, later he was signed as a free agent by the Atlanta Hawks in his second year. He played for the Phoenix Suns during the 1999 season, playing his most consistent season (79 games, 14 mpg, 4.8 points, 1.6 rebounds and 2.2 assists per game). He also played with the Suns during the 1999-2000 season, which was the only time in his NBA career that he played on one team for two consecutive years.

Afterwards, Livingston appeared in two games for the Golden State Warriors during the 2000-01 season, and played for the Seattle SuperSonics in 2001–02; he also played with two teams in the CBA. He played briefly for the New Orleans Hornets during 2002–03. He was on the roster for the 2003-04 EA Sports Midwest All-Stars, as well as the Los Angeles Clippers during the 2003-04 NBA season, and was with the Utah Jazz in 2004–05.

Livingston was drafted in the 2005 AAPBL Draft, but the league folded soon thereafter. He spent the beginning of 2005–06 in the Turkish league, playing for Galatasaray, and joined the NBA Development League's Idaho Stampede (for whom he had once played while the team competed in the CBA) in February 2006. He also appeared in five games with the Chicago Bulls in March. In 2006–07 he began with the Stampede once again but, on April 11, 2007, signed a contract for the remainder of the season with the SuperSonics, for a second time. This was due to almost simultaneous injuries to Earl Watson and Luke Ridnour. For his final NBA season, he played 26 minutes in four games, totalling one rebound and four assists.

In 2006–07's NBDL, Livingston's 12.0 points per game for the Stampede were tied for 44th in the league and his 10.5 assists second only to Will Conroy. The following season, as the Stampede were crowned the competition's winners after beating the Austin Toros 2–1, Livingston retired from professional basketball. Although officially retired, the Erie BayHawks of the D-League still drafted him in the expansion draft, in hopes of bringing him out of retirement.

After an MVP season where he led the Idaho Stampede to its first and only NBA Development League Championship, the Idaho Stampede retired Livingston's Jersey which still hangs today at the Century Link Arena located in Boise Idaho.

Having played 203 regular season games, Livingston has the NBA record for fewest games played across 11 or more seasons. Sean Marks, who played 230 games, is the only other player of 11+ NBA seasons with under 430 regular season games.

== Post-retirement and coaching career ==
From 2010 to 2012, he was the head coach for the Idaho Stampede.

After his stint coaching the Stampede, he moved to Australia, where he served as a scout and coaching consultant. In August 2016, he was voted into the greater New Orleans Sports Hall of Fame. He was also hired as an assistant basketball coach for Louisiana State University.

In 2018, Livingston returned to his alma mater Isidore Newman School and coached the 7th and 8th grade boys basketball team. The team went on to win the middle school city championship. The next season, Livingston was chosen to replace retiring Jimmy Tillette as head coach of Newman's varsity boys basketball team. One of his players was Arch Manning, son of Cooper Manning and nephew to Peyton and Eli.

During Livingston's coaching tenure, Newman won a Louisiana state title in both 2022 – Newman's first title since 1993 – and 2023.

In 2023, following a recruitment violation, Livingston was suspended by the LHSAA from coaching for a calendar year, and Newman was stripped of their state championships in 2022 and 2023. In response, Livingston filed suit against the LHSAA. On January 18, 2024, at an injunction hearing, Judge Monique Barial issued a preliminary injunction, ruling in Livingston's favor and allowing him to coach.

== NBA career statistics ==
Legend
GP	Games played	GS	Games started	MPG	Minutes per game
FG%	Field goal percentage	3P%	3-point field goal percentage	FT%	Free throw percentage
RPG	Rebounds per game	APG	Assists per game	SPG	Steals per game
BPG	Blocks per game	PPG	Points per game	**Bold**	Career high

=== Regular season ===
Year	Team	GP	GS	MPG	FG%	3P%	FT%	RPG	APG	SPG	BPG	PPG
1996–97	Houston	64	0	15.3	.437	.409	.646	1.5	2.4	.6	**.2**	3.9
1997–98	Atlanta	12	0	6.8	.250	–	.800	.5	.4	.6	**.2**	.8
1998–99	Phoenix	1	0	**22.0**	**.625**	–	**1.000**	**2.0**	**3.0**	**2.0**	.0	**12.0**
1999–00	Phoenix	**79**	**15**	13.7	.416	.345	.839	1.6	2.2	.6	**.2**	4.8
2000–01	Golden State	2	0	3.5	.000	.000	–	.5	.5	.0	.0	.0
2001–02	Seattle	13	0	13.5	.278	.125	.909	1.9	2.0	.7	**.2**	3.2
2002–03	New Orleans	2	0	6.0	.500	–	**1.000**	.0	.5	.0	.0	3.0
2003–04	L.A. Clippers	4	0	12.0	.200	.000	.667	1.8	1.5	.5	.0	2.0
2004–05	Utah	17	4	13.4	.423	**.625**	.882	.7	2.6	.7	.1	3.8
2005–06	Chicago	5	0	4.4	.000	–	–	.8	.2	.2	.0	.0
2006–07	Seattle	4	0	6.5	.000	–	–	.3	1.0	.0	.0	.0
Career		203	19	13.6	.406	.351	.771	1.4	2.0	.6	.2	3.8

=== Playoffs ===
Year	Team	GP	GS	MPG	FG%	3P%	FT%	RPG	APG	SPG	BPG	PPG
1997	Houston	2	0	7.5	.250	**1.000**	–	.0	**2.0**	.5	.0	1.5
1999	Phoenix	3	0	8.0	.400	.000	**1.000**	**2.3**	.7	.3	.0	**5.3**
2000	Phoenix	**7**	**3**	9.0	.222	.333	–	1.0	.6	**.6**	**.1**	2.0
2002	Seattle	5	0	**16.0**	**.412**	.333	**1.000**	1.2	**2.0**	.4	.0	4.0
Career		17	3	10.7	.317	.364	1.000	1.2	1.2	.5	.1	3.1

== Honors and awards ==
- CBA Champion: 2004–05
- NBADL Champion: 2007–08
- NBADL MVP: 2006–07
- All-NBADL First-team: 2006–2007, 2007–08
- All-CBA First-team: 2005
- All-CBA Second-team: 1999, 2002, 2004
- Most assists in an NBADL game (22)
