= Lincoln Preparatory School (Grambling, Louisiana) =

Coordinates: 32°31′20″N 92°42′38″W

- 1453 Martin Luther King Jr Ave; Grambling, Louisiana 71245; United States

Information
- Type: Charter
- Colors: Forest green, black and white
- Mascot: Panthers
- Website: www.lincolnprep.school

Lincoln Preparatory School is a charter school in Grambling, Louisiana, USA.

== History ==
Lincoln Preparatory School was previously known as Grambling State University Laboratory High School. It was a public high school operated by Grambling State University in Grambling, Louisiana, USA. Alma J. Brown Elementary, Grambling Middle Magnet School and Grambling State University Laboratory High School merged under one charter system. The changes took effect for the 2016–17 school year and the name was changed to Lincoln Preparatory School. Grambling State University had previously supplemented the schools with higher education funding, but budget cuts to higher education in Louisiana endangered the public school options in Grambling and the schools may have closed.

== Athletics ==
Lincoln Preparatory School athletics competes in the LHSAA.

== Notable alumni ==
=== Grambling State University Laboratory High School ===
- Walter Dean, NFL player
- Paul Millsap, NBA player
- Paul "Tank" Younger, NFL player
