= Jason Collier Sportsmanship Award =

The Jason Collier Sportsmanship Award is an annual NBA G League award given since the league's inaugural National Basketball Developmental League season. The award honors the player who best represents the ideals of character and conduct on and off the court. The league's head coaches determine the award by voting and it is usually presented to the honoree during the G League playoffs. The award is named after former D-League, Houston Rockets and Atlanta Hawks center Jason Collier, who died on October 15, 2005. He was ready to begin his sixth NBA season at the time of his death. Billy Thomas, Andre Ingram, Ron Howard, and Galen Robinson Jr. have each won the award on two occasions.

== Winners ==
Season	Winner	Team
2001–02	Mike Wilks	Huntsville Flight
2002–03	Billy Thomas	Greenville Groove
2003–04	N/A	N/A
2004–05	N/A	N/A
2005–06	Ime Udoka	Fort Worth Flyers
2006–07	Roger Powell	Arkansas RimRockers
2007–08	Billy Thomas (2)	Colorado 14ers
2008–09	Will Conroy	Albuquerque Thunderbirds
2009–10	Andre Ingram	Utah Flash
2010–11	Larry Owens	Tulsa 66ers
2011–12	Moses Ehambe	Iowa Energy
2012–13	Ron Howard	Fort Wayne Mad Ants (1)
2013–14	Ron Howard (2)	Fort Wayne Mad Ants (2)
2014–15	Renaldo Major	Bakersfield Jam
2015–16	Scott Suggs	Raptors 905
2016–17	Keith Wright	Westchester Knicks (1)
2017–18	C. J. Williams	Agua Caliente Clippers
2018–19	Gabe York	Lakeland Magic
2019–20	Ivan Rabb	Westchester Knicks (2)
2020–21	Galen Robinson Jr.	Austin Spurs
2021–22	Andre Ingram (2)	South Bay Lakers
2022–23	Nate Pierre-Louis	South Bay Lakers (2)
2023–24	Gabe Osabuohien	Cleveland Charge
2024–25	Galen Robinson Jr. (2)	Birmingham Squadron
2025–26	Max Abmas	Salt Lake City Stars

== Multiple-time winners ==
Awards	Player	Team(s)	Years
2	Ron Howard	Fort Wayne Mad Ants	2012–13, 2013–14
2	Andre Ingram	Utah Flash (1) / South Bay Lakers (1)	2009–10, 2021–22
2	Billy Thomas	Greenville Groove (1) / Colorado 14ers (1)	2002–03, 2007–08
2	Galen Robinson Jr.	Austin Spurs (1) / Birmingham Squadron (1)	2020–21, 2024–25

== See also ==
- NBA Sportsmanship Award
