= Renaldo Major =

American basketball player (born 1982)

Personal information
- Born: May 7, 1982 (age 44) Chicago, Illinois, U.S.
- Listed height: 6 ft 7 in (2.01 m)
- Listed weight: 190 lb (86 kg)

Career information
- High school: Carver (Chicago, Illinois)
- College: South Plains (2000–2002); Fresno State (2002–2004)
- NBA draft: 2004: undrafted
- Playing career: 2004–2020
- Position: Small forward
- Number: 12
- Coaching career: 2020–present

Career history

Playing
- 2004–2005: Gary Steelheads
- 2005–2006: Dodge City Legend
- 2005–2006: Sioux Falls Skyforce
- 2006: Gary Steelheads
- 2006–2007: Dakota Wizards
- 2007: Golden State Warriors
- 2008–2011: Dakota Wizards
- 2011–2016: Bakersfield Jam
- 2012: Fuerza Regia
- 2013: Mets de Guaynabo
- 2013: Kataja
- 2016–2017: Reno Bighorns
- 2017: Moncton Magic
- 2018: Yakima SunKings
- 2019: Kansas City Tornadoes

Coaching
- 2021–2023: Sioux Falls Skyforce

Career highlights
- NBA D-League champion (2007); NBA D-League All-Star (2007); All-NBA D-League First Team (2007); NBA D-League Defensive Player of the Year (2007); USBL champion (2005); All-USBL First Team (2006); All-USBL Second Team (2005); WAC All-Newcomer Team (2003)
- Stats at NBA.com
- Stats at Basketball Reference
Medals
Men's basketball
Representing United States
Pan American Games
Bronze medal – third place	2011 Guadalajara	National team

Renaldo Major (born May 7, 1982) is an American professional basketball coach and former player. He was previously the head coach for the Fresno Fire of The Basketball League. Previously, he played for the Kansas City Tornadoes and the Yakima SunKings.

He played college basketball for South Plains College and Fresno State. With 5,058 career points, Major is the all-time leading scorer in the NBA G League's history.

== College career ==
From 2000 to 2002, Major played college basketball for South Plains College where he was an all-conference selection in 2000–01 and averaged 13 points and eight rebounds per game in 2001–02. He then transferred to Fresno State in 2002 where he earned WAC All-Newcomer Team honors in 2002–03. He played 28 games and started six of them in 2002–03.

In his two-year career at Fresno State, he averaged 10.2 points, 4.1 rebounds and 1.1 assists in 41 games (13 starts).

Year	Team	GP	GS	MPG	FG%	3P%	FT%	RPG	APG	SPG	BPG	PPG
2002–03	Fresno State	28	6	22.7	.516	.486	.805	4.5	1.1	.4	.4	10.0
2003–04	Fresno State	13	7	26.7	.412	.345	.778	3.5	1.1	.7	.2	10.7
Career		41	13	24.0	.477	.424	.795	4.1	1.1	.5	.4	10.2

== Professional career ==
=== Gary Steelheads (2004–2005) ===
In 2004–05, Major played for the Gary Steelheads of the Continental Basketball Association.

=== Dodge City Legend (2005) ===
Major joined the Dodge City Legend of the United States Basketball League for the 2005 season.

=== Sioux Falls Skyforce and returns to Gary and Dodge City (2005–2006) ===
In 2005–06, Major spent time with both the Sioux Falls Skyforce and the Gary Steelheads, before again re-joining the Dodge City Legend for the 2006 USBL season.

=== Dakota Wizards (2006–2007) ===
On November 2, 2006, Major was selected by the Dakota Wizards in the fourth round of 2006 NBA D-League draft.

=== Golden State Warriors (2007) ===
On January 17, 2007, Major signed a 10-day contract with the Golden State Warriors. Major described it as a "dream come true." That day, he played in the only NBA game of his career. He played 27 minutes and scored five points on 2-for-10 shooting in a loss to the Los Angeles Clippers at the Staples Center.

=== Return to Dakota (2007–2011) ===
Following the ten days with the Warriors, Major returned to Dakota, where he played out the 2006–07 season.

In July 2007, Major joined the Miami Heat for the 2007 NBA Summer League. On August 1, 2007, he signed with Tisettanta Cantù of Italy for the 2007–08 season. Later that month, he was released in favor of Denham Brown. While trialling with the Denver Nuggets in October 2007, a loose heart valve was detected during a routine medical, requiring him to have open heart surgery and scuppering his chances of a deal with the franchise.

After missing the entire 2007–08 season with his heart problem, Major re-joined the Dakota Wizards in 2008 where he went on to play three seasons for them.

=== Bakersfield Jam (2011–2012) ===
In November 2011, Major joined the Bakersfield Jam. On December 9, 2011, he signed with the Los Angeles Clippers but he was later released on December 19, 2011, and he returned to Bakersfield.

In July 2012, Major joined the NBA D-League Select Team for the 2012 NBA Summer League. In August 2012, Major signed with Fuerza Regia of Mexico before leaving in September. In November 2012, he was reacquired by the Bakersfield Jam.

=== Mets de Guaynabo (2013) ===
After the D-League season, Major signed with the Mets de Guaynabo of Puerto Rico.

=== Kataja Basket Club (2013) ===
In August 2013, Major signed with Kataja Basket Club of Finland for the 2013–14 season but later left in December 2013 after 12 league games and five EuroChallenge games.

=== Return to Bakersfield (2014–2016) ===
In January 2014, Major re-joined the Bakersfield Jam.

In July 2014, Major signed with the Cheshire Phoenix of the British Basketball League but later left the team in September 2014 after sustaining a foot injury. In November 2014, he once again returned to Bakersfield. On December 5, 2014, he reclaimed the NBA D-League all-time scoring record from Ron Howard. On April 20, 2015, he was named the recipient of the 2015 NBA Development League's Jason Collier Sportsmanship Award.

In November 2015, Major returned to the Jam for a fifth stint.

=== Reno Bighorns (2016–2017) ===
On October 31, 2016, Major was acquired by the Reno Bighorns.

=== Moncton Magic (2017) ===
Major also played for the Moncton Magic during 2017.

=== Yakima SunKings (2018) ===
Major led the Yakima SunKings to a league championship in 2018.

=== Kansas City Tornadoes (2018–2019) ===
On October 12, 2018, Major was acquired by the Kansas City Tornadoes.

== Coaching career ==
At the end of the 2018 NAPB season, Major served as the player-coach for the Yakima SunKings.

== Career statistics ==
Legend
GP	Games played	GS	Games started	MPG	Minutes per game
FG%	Field goal percentage	3P%	3-point field goal percentage	FT%	Free throw percentage
RPG	Rebounds per game	APG	Assists per game	SPG	Steals per game
BPG	Blocks per game	PPG	Points per game	**Bold**	Career high

=== NBA ===
Year	Team	GP	GS	MPG	FG%	3P%	FT%	RPG	APG	SPG	BPG	PPG
2006–07	Golden State	1	0	27.0	.200	—	.500	2.0	0.0	2.0	0.0	5.0
**Career**		1	0	27.0	.200	—	.500	2.0	0.0	2.0	0.0	5.0

=== NBA D-League ===
†	Denotes seasons in which Major won an NBA D-League championship

Year	Team	GP	GS	MPG	FG%	3P%	FT%	RPG	APG	SPG	BPG	PPG
2006–07†	Dakota	45	45	33.9	.502	.280	.812	5.4	2.6	1.5	0.7	**18.2**
2008–09	Dakota	42	42	**38.1**	.520	.245	.846	5.3	**3.5**	**1.9**	0.8	16.9
2009–10	Dakota	**49**	8	27.8	.519	.320	.831	4.5	2.3	1.0	**1.0**	12.3
2010–11	Dakota	**49**	**48**	35.1	.513	.211	.754	**5.5**	1.7	1.3	0.7	15.7
2011–12	Bakersfield	46	46	31.8	**.533**	.214	.789	4.7	2.3	1.5	0.9	15.2
2012–13	Bakersfield	41	36	29.0	.464	.241	.793	3.3	1.3	1.3	0.8	13.6
2013–14	Bakersfield	11	2	23.5	.500	**.412**	.808	3.4	1.2	1.3	0.6	8.4
2014–15	Bakersfield	46	9	24.0	.500	.410	.825	3.4	1.5	1.2	0.6	8.7
2015–16	Bakersfield	42	8	19.3	.459	.360	**.852**	1.9	1.0	0.6	0.5	6.1
2016–17	Reno	29	1	18.1	.390	.379	.776	1.8	0.6	0.7	0.4	5.1
**Career**		400	245	28.9	.502	.324	.805	4.1	1.9	1.3	0.7	12.6

=== NBA D-League / G League Records ===
Renaldo Major holds the NBA G League record for the following statistical categories:

- Most points scored, career (5,058)
- Most minutes played, career (11,555)
- Most field goals made, career (1,702)
- Most free throws made, career (1,486)
- Most free throws attempted, career (1,847)
- Most steals, career (502)
- Most personal fouls, career (969)

Former records

- Most games played, career (400); surpassed by Andre Ingram on January 12, 2019. (Note: Although Basketball-Reference lists Major with 400 games played, a tweet from the NBA G League's official Twitter account listed Major with 401 games played.)
- Most field goals attempted, career (3,392)

== National team career ==
In 2011, Major won a bronze medal with the USA Basketball Men's Pan American Games Team.

== Personal ==
Major is the son of Natline Jones and the late Ronald Major, and has one brother, Amir, and three sisters, Latoye, Amira and Ashing. His father worked as a security guard for the University of Chicago for twelve years and died of a stroke in May 2008.

Growing up, Major was primarily interested in playing baseball until he witnessed Michael Jordan's failed baseball career.

== See also ==
- List of NBA G League career scoring leaders
