= NBA G League Coach of the Year Award =

The NBA G League Coach of the Year is an annual NBA G League award given since the 2006–07 season to the best head coach of the regular season. The league's head coaches determine the award by voting and it is usually presented to the honoree during the G League playoffs. The winner receives the Dennis Johnson Trophy, which is named in honor of Hall of Fame player Dennis Johnson, a star NBA guard who died in 2007 while serving as head coach of the Austin Toros, in what was then known as the NBA Development League (or D-League).

In 2015–16, Sioux Falls Skyforce head coach Dan Craig was named the recipient of Coach of the Year after guiding the Skyforce to a 40–10 regular-season record, the best mark in league history.

== Winners ==
Season	Coach	Team
2006–07	Bryan Gates	Idaho Stampede
2007–08	Bryan Gates (2)	Idaho Stampede (2)
2008–09	Quin Snyder	Austin Toros
2009–10	Chris Finch	Rio Grande Valley Vipers
2010–11	Nick Nurse	Iowa Energy
2011–12	Eric Musselman	Los Angeles D-Fenders
2012–13	Alex Jensen	Canton Charge
2013–14	Conner Henry	Fort Wayne Mad Ants
2014–15	Scott Morrison	Maine Red Claws
2015–16	Dan Craig	Sioux Falls Skyforce
2016–17	Jerry Stackhouse	Raptors 905
2017–18	Mike Miller	Westchester Knicks
2018–19	Will Weaver	Long Island Nets
2019–20	Martin Schiller	Salt Lake City Stars
2020–21	Stan Heath	Lakeland Magic
2021–22	Mahmoud Abdelfattah	Rio Grande Valley Vipers (2)
2022–23	Ronnie Burrell	Long Island Nets (2)
2023–24	Lindsey Harding	Stockton Kings
2024–25	Scott King	Austin Spurs
2025–26	Vitor Galvani	Mexico City Capitanes

== See also ==
- NBA Coach of the Year Award
