= 2007 NBA Development League draft =

General information
- Sport: Basketball
- Date: November 1, 2007

Overview
- League: NBA
- First selection: Eddie Gill, Colorado 14ers

The 2007 NBA Development League draft was held on November 1, 2007, at 8PM. There were ten rounds.

== Rounds ==
Round 1
Team	Draftee
Colorado 14ers	Eddie Gill
Dakota Wizards	Carlos Powell
Albuquerque Thunderbirds	Darvin Ham
Idaho Stampede	Jamaal Tatum
Rio Grande Valley Vipers	C.J. Watson
Sioux Falls Skyforce	Nik Caner-Medley
Fort Wayne Mad Ants	Larry Turner
Los Angeles D-Fenders	Jelani McCoy
Anaheim Arsenal	Kedrick Brown
Utah Flash	Kevin Kruger
Tulsa 66ers	Glen McGowan
Austin Toros	Kevin Pittsnogle
Bakersfield Jam	Forfeit
Iowa Energy	Dwayne Mitchell

Round 2
Team	Draftee
Iowa Energy	Jahsha Bluntt
Bakersfield Jam	Jamison Brewer
Austin Toros	Carldell Johnson
Tulsa 66ers	Adam Harrington
Utah Flash	Michael Cuffee
Anaheim Arsenal	Ivan Johnson
Los Angeles D-Fenders	Robert Whaley
Fort Wayne Mad Ants	Lukasz Obrzut
Sioux Falls Skyforce	Carl Elliot
Rio Grande Valley Vipers	Quin Humphrey
Idaho Stampede	Brent Petway
Albuquerque Thunderbirds	Daniel Horton
Dakota Wizards	David Palmer
Colorado 14ers	Kelly Whitney

Round 3
Team	Draftee
Colorado 14ers	Julian Sensley
Dakota Wizards	Kibwe Trim
Albuquerque Thunderbirds	James Smith
Idaho Stampede	Ricky Woods
Rio Grande Valley Vipers	John Davis
Sioux Falls Skyforce	Jason Klotz
Fort Wayne Mad Ants	Cory Minnifield
Los Angeles D-Fenders	Marcus White
Anaheim Arsenal	Anthony Harris
Utah Flash	Aleksandar Ugrinoski
Tulsa 66ers	Dwight Brewington
Austin Toros	Melvin Council
Bakersfield	Jam James Peters
Iowa Energy	Nick Lewis

Round 4
Team	Draftee
Iowa Energy	Rob Summers
Bakersfield Jam	Brian Wethers
Austin Toros	Levi Stukes
Tulsa 66ers	DeAndre Rice
Utah Flash	Lamar Rice
Anaheim Arsenal	Derrick Franklin
Los Angeles D-Fenders	Abdoulaye N'Diaye
Fort Wayne Mad Ants	Shagari Alleyne
Sioux Falls Skyforce	Evan Burns
Rio Grande Valley Vipers	Rob Griffin
Idaho Stampede	Marcus Campbell
Albuquerque Thunderbirds	Tiras Wade
Dakota Wizards	Blake Ahearn
Colorado 14ers	Brandon Dean

Round 5
Team	Draftee
Colorado 14ers	Damien Lolar
Dakota Wizards	Aristide Sawodago
Albuquerque Thunderbirds	Ejike Ugboaja
Idaho Stampede	Martin Samarco
Rio Grande Valley Vipers	Jason Clark
Sioux Falls Skyforce	J.C. Mathis
Fort Wayne Mad Ants	Julius Ashby
Los Angeles D-Fenders	Cecil Brown
Anaheim Arsenal	Tyrone Anderson
Utah Flash	Ismail Muhammad
Tulsa 66ers	Keith Closs
Austin Toros	Ashanti Cook
Bakersfield Jam	Donell Williams
Iowa Energy	Alfred Neale

Round 6
Team	Draftee
Iowa Energy	Fabricio Vay
Bakersfield Jam	Jason Harris
Austin Toros	Brad Stricker
Tulsa 66ers	Michael Peeples
Utah Flash	Trayvon Lathan
Anaheim Arsenal	B.J. Walker
Los Angeles D-Fenders	Darren Cooper
Fort Wayne Mad Ants	Frank Richards
Sioux Falls Skyforce	Ronald Allen
Rio Grande Valley Vipers	Jesse Smith
Idaho Stampede	Jason Ellis
Albuquerque Thunderbirds	Ali Berdiel
Dakota Wizards	Armein Kirkland
Colorado 14ers	Tyronne Beale

Round 7
Team	Draftee
Colorado 14ers	Marcus Saunders
Dakota Wizards	Wil Frisby
Albuquerque Thunderbirds	Josh Gross
Idaho Stampede	Dwuan Rice
Rio Grande Valley Vipers	Royce Parran
Sioux Falls Skyforce	Milone Clark
Fort Wayne Mad Ants	Ron Howard
Los Angeles D-Fenders	Martane Freeman
Anaheim Arsenal	Clarence Sanders
Utah Flash	Andre Ingram
Tulsa 66ers	Rashid Byrd
Austin Toros	Daryl Dorsey
Bakersfield Jam	O'Neal Mims
Iowa Energy Mike	Efevberha

Round 8
Team	Draftee
Iowa Energy	James Beasley
Bakersfield Jam	Richard Andrews
Austin Toros	Joseph Works
Tulsa 66ers	Abe Badmus
Utah Flash	Dwayne Shackleford
Anaheim Arsenal	Marquis Webb
Los Angeles D-Fenders	Forrest Fisher
Fort Wayne Mad Ants	Nate Gerwig
Sioux Falls Skyforce	Michael Joiner
Rio Grande Valley Vipers	Craig Winder
Idaho Stampede	Tim Jennings
Albuquerque Thunderbirds	Michael Adams
Dakota Wizards	Donta Richardson
Colorado 14ers	Lou White

Round 9
Team	Draftee
Colorado 14ers	Chad Bell
Dakota Wizards	Perrin Johnson
Albuquerque Thunderbirds	Ramon Dyer
Idaho Stampede	Marlon London
Rio Grande Valley Vipers	Derrick Allen
Sioux Falls Skyforce	Sammy Monroe
Fort Wayne Mad Ants	Anthony Kyle
Los Angeles D-Fenders	Ivan Jenkins
Anaheim Arsenal	Lorenzo Williams
Utah Flash	Garry Hill-Thomas
Tulsa 66ers	Schea Cotton
Austin Toros	Tim Bush
Bakersfield Jam	Lamar Gayle
Iowa Energy	Ian Young

Round 10
Team	Draftee
Iowa Energy	Larry House
Bakersfield Jam	George Williams
Austin Toros Ronald	Blackshear
Tulsa 66ers Dwight	Dwight Jones
Utah Flash Tyree	Tyree Jones
Anaheim Arsenal	Bruce Brown
Los Angeles D-Fenders	Damond Williams
Fort Wayne Mad Ants	Casey Love
Sioux Falls Skyforce	Fred Robinson
Rio Grande Valley Vipers	John Bunch
Idaho Stampede	Derrick Stevens
Albuquerque Thunderbirds	Tim Smith
Dakota Wizards	Tony Gipson
Colorado 14ers	Antonio Griffin
Bakersfield Jam	Anthony Wilkins
