= Galen Robinson Jr. =

American basketball player (born 1997)

Free agent
- Position: Point guard

Personal information
- Born: March 31, 1997 (age 29) Houston, Texas, U.S.
- Listed height: 6 ft 1 in (1.85 m)
- Listed weight: 190 lb (86 kg)

Career information
- High school: Westbury Christian (Houston, Texas)
- College: Houston (2015–2019)
- NBA draft: 2019: undrafted
- Playing career: 2019–present

Career history
- 2019–2022: Austin Spurs
- 2020: BG Göttingen
- 2021: Plateros de Fresnillo
- 2022–2023: Élan Chalon
- 2023: Sioux Falls Skyforce
- 2023: Austin Spurs
- 2023–2025: Birmingham Squadron

Career highlights
- 2× NBA G League Sportsmanship Award (2021, 2025); AAC All-Rookie team (2016)
- Stats at NBA.com
- Stats at Basketball Reference

Galen Vondell Robinson Jr. (born March 31, 1997) is an American professional basketball player who last played for the Birmingham Squadron of the NBA G League. He played college basketball for the Houston Cougars.

== High school career ==
Robinson attended Westbury Christian where he led the Wildcats to three straight Texas Association of Private and Parochial Schools state championships. In his junior year, he averaged 17.0 points, 5.0 rebounds and 6.0 assists, being honored as the state tournament's Most Valuable Player after leading Westbury to the state championship, including a game-winning 3-pointer with just 0.8 seconds remaining in the state quarterfinals.

As a senior, Robinson averaged 17.0 points, 5.0 rebounds and 6.0 assists while repeating as state champions. By the end of the season, he received the Guy V. Lewis Award as the city of Houston's top high school player, was named to the All-Greater Houston First Team by the Houston Chronicle, was a member of TAPPS All-State and All-District First Teams and earned a selection to the All-VYPE Private/Preps First Team.

== College career ==
Robinson played college basketball for Houston, seeing action in 136 career games, starting 119, while averaging 6.8 points, 2.8 rebounds, 4.3 assists and 1.2 steals in 27.7 minutes. As a senior, he played in 37 games and averaged 8.0 points and 4.9 assists 29.9 minutes. He ended up setting Houston records with 136 games played and became the team's second-winningest player with 103 victories while finishing among Houston's top-10 leaders in assists, wins, conference wins, games played, conference games played, games started, conference games started and minutes played. He also became the AAC career leader in assists.

== Professional career ==
=== Austin Spurs (2019–2020) ===
After going undrafted in the 2019 NBA draft, Robinson joined the San Antonio Spurs for the 2019 NBA Summer League and on October 15, 2019, he signed an Exhibit 10 deal with San Antonio, but was waived the next day. Ten days later, he signed with the Austin Spurs as an affiliate player where he played in 30 games and averaged 8.1 points, 2.3 rebounds and 4.6 assists in 23.3 minutes before the season was cancelled due to the COVID-19 pandemic.

=== Göttingen (2020–2021) ===
On September 29, 2020, Robinson signed with BG Göttingen of the Basketball Bundesliga, where he averaged 7.1 points, 1.0 rebounds and 3.8 assists. On January 11, 2021, he parted ways with the club.

=== Return to Austin (2021–2022) ===
On February 21, 2021, Robinson re-signed with the Austin Spurs, making an immediate impact with a career-high 14 assists in his season debut, a 122–107 loss to the Delaware Blue Coats. He played in eight games and averaged 7.8 points, 6.4 assists and 1.38 steals and on March 16, he received the Jason Collier Sportsmanship Award.

=== Élan Chalon (2022–2023) ===
On October 30, 2022, Robinson signed with Élan Chalon of the French Pro B.

=== Sioux Falls Skyforce (2023) ===
On March 6, 2023, Robinson was acquired off waivers by the Sioux Falls Skyforce of the NBA G League. He was waived six days later.

=== Third stint with Austin (2023) ===
On March 15, 2023, Robinson was reacquired by the Austin Spurs.

=== Birmingham Squadron (2023–2025) ===
On October 29, 2023, Robinson signed with the Birmingham Squadron.

On September 24, 2024, Robinson signed with the New Orleans Pelicans, but was waived the same day. On October 28, he rejoined the Squadron.

== Career statistics ==
Legend
| GP | Games played | GS | Games started | MPG | Minutes per game |
| FG% | Field goal percentage | 3P% | 3-point field goal percentage | FT% | Free throw percentage |
| RPG | Rebounds per game | APG | Assists per game | SPG | Steals per game |
| BPG | Blocks per game | PPG | Points per game | **Bold** | Career high |

=== College ===
| Year | Team | GP | GS | MPG | FG% | 3P% | FT% | RPG | APG | SPG | BPG | PPG |
|---|---|---|---|---|---|---|---|---|---|---|---|---|
| 2015–16 | Houston | 32 | 22 | 24.3 | **.458** | .305 | .695 | 2.4 | 3.4 | 1.0 | **.1** | 7.9 |
| 2016–17 | Houston | 32 | 28 | **32.2** | .367 | .265 | .594 | **3.3** | 4.8 | 1.0 | **.1** | 6.5 |
| 2017–18 | Houston | 35 | 32 | 24.5 | .447 | .182 | **.708** | 2.4 | 3.7 | **1.3** | **.1** | 4.7 |
| 2018–19 | Houston | **37** | **37** | 29.9 | .449 | **.350** | .667 | 3.1 | **4.9** | **1.3** | **.1** | **8.0** |
| Career | | 136 | 119 | 27.8 | .429 | .300 | .662 | 2.8 | 4.3 | 1.2 | .1 | 6.8 |

== Personal life ==
He is the son of Galen Robinson Sr. and Alicea Richmond. His father competed for the Cougars from 1994 to 1998, scoring 1,135 points to rank 30th in school career history and during his career, was a USBWA All-District, NABC All-District 9 and two-time All-Conference USA Third-Team honoree. He majored in health.

Robinson created a clothing line, which he has used to raise awareness of World Suicide Prevention Day through a series of "You Are Loved" Suicide Awareness Prevention Hoodies and has also used his philanthropic exploits in support of Black Lives Matter.
