= 2015–16 NBA Development League season =

- League: NBA Development League
- Sport: Basketball
- Duration: November – April

Draft
- Top draft pick: Jeff Ayres
- Picked by: Idaho Stampede

Regular season
- Top seed: Sioux Falls Skyforce
- Season MVP: Jarnell Stokes (Sioux Falls Skyforce)

Finals
- Champions: Sioux Falls Skyforce
- Runners-up: Los Angeles D-Fenders
- Finals MVP: Jarnell Stokes

NBA Development League seasons
- ← 2014–15 2016–17 →

The 2015–16 NBA Development League season was the 15th season of the NBA Development League (NBA D-League). The NBA D-League is the official minor league basketball organization owned by the National Basketball Association (NBA).

The League expanded to a record 19 teams for the 2015–16 season. An expansion team, Raptors 905, joined the 18 teams from the previous season, while the Fort Wayne Mad Ants were purchased by the Indiana Pacers, leaving just 11 NBA teams without a D-League affiliate for this season (in the 2016–17 season the number of NBA teams without a D-League affiliate will reduce to 8 with the debuts of franchises owned by the Brooklyn Nets, Charlotte Hornets, and Chicago Bulls).

The league consisted of two conferences with two divisions each, three with five and one with four. To even out the divisions, the Canton Charge were moved from the East Division to the Central Division.

== Teams ==
- Austin Spurs (affiliated with the San Antonio Spurs)
- Bakersfield Jam (affiliated with the Phoenix Suns)
- Canton Charge (affiliated with the Cleveland Cavaliers)
- Delaware 87ers (affiliated with the Philadelphia 76ers)
- Erie BayHawks (affiliated with the Orlando Magic)
- Fort Wayne Mad Ants (affiliated with the Indiana Pacers)
- Grand Rapids Drive (affiliated with the Detroit Pistons)
- Idaho Stampede (affiliated with the Utah Jazz)
- Iowa Energy (affiliated with the Memphis Grizzlies)
- Los Angeles D-Fenders (affiliated with the Los Angeles Lakers)
- Maine Red Claws (affiliated with the Boston Celtics)
- Oklahoma City Blue (affiliated with the Oklahoma City Thunder)
- Raptors 905 (affiliated with the Toronto Raptors)
- Reno Bighorns (affiliated with the Sacramento Kings)
- Rio Grande Valley Vipers (affiliated with the Houston Rockets)
- Santa Cruz Warriors (affiliated with the Golden State Warriors)
- Sioux Falls Skyforce (affiliated with the Miami Heat)
- Texas Legends (affiliated with the Dallas Mavericks)
- Westchester Knicks (affiliated with the New York Knicks)

== Regular season ==
=== Eastern Conference ===
Atlantic Division

| Team | W | L | PCT | GB | Home | Road |
|---|---|---|---|---|---|---|
| y-Maine Red Claws | 31 | 19 | .620 | -- | 15–10 | 16–9 |
| x-Westchester Knicks | 28 | 22 | .560 | 3 | 13-12 | 15–10 |
| Raptors 905 | 23 | 27 | .460 | 8 | 10-15 | 13–12 |
| Delaware 87ers | 21 | 29 | .420 | 10 | 13-11 | 8–18 |
| Erie BayHawks | 12 | 38 | .240 | 19 | 9-16 | 3-22 |

Central Division

| Team | W | L | PCT | GB | Home | Road |
|---|---|---|---|---|---|---|
| z-Sioux Falls Skyforce | 40 | 10 | .800 | -- | 22–3 | 18–7 |
| x-Canton Charge | 31 | 19 | .620 | 9 | 18-7 | 13–12 |
| Iowa Energy | 26 | 24 | .520 | 14 | 15-11 | 12–13 |
| Grand Rapids Drive | 21 | 29 | .420 | 19 | 14-11 | 7–18 |
| Fort Wayne Mad Ants | 20 | 30 | .400 | 20 | 13-12 | 7–18 |

=== Western Conference ===
Pacific Division

| Team | W | L | PCT | GB | Home | Road |
|---|---|---|---|---|---|---|
| z-Reno Bighorns | 33 | 17 | .660 | -- | 20-5 | 13–12 |
| x-Los Angeles D-Fenders | 27 | 23 | .540 | 6 | 17–8 | 10–15 |
| Bakersfield Jam | 22 | 28 | .440 | 11 | 13–12 | 9–16 |
| Idaho Stampede | 20 | 30 | .400 | 13 | 13–12 | 7–18 |
| Santa Cruz Warriors | 19 | 31 | .380 | 14 | 12–13 | 7–18 |

Southwest Division

| Team | W | L | PCT | GB | Home | Road |
|---|---|---|---|---|---|---|
| y-Austin Spurs | 30 | 20 | .600 | -- | 15–10 | 15–10 |
| x-Rio Grande Valley Vipers | 29 | 21 | .580 | 1 | 18–7 | 11–14 |
| Texas Legends | 23 | 27 | .460 | 7 | 13–12 | 10–15 |
| Oklahoma City Blue | 19 | 31 | .380 | 11 | 10–15 | 9–16 |

== Playoffs ==
The Sioux Falls Skyforce (winners of a record forty games during the regular season) won the title over the Los Angeles D-Fenders in three games, winning Game 1 104–99 before Los Angeles tied it up with a 109–102 victory in Game 2, and the Skyforce closed out the title with a 91–63 victory at home. It was their first D-League title and their third overall title, having won two titles (1996, 2005) in the Continental Basketball Association.

Quarterfinals; April 5–12; Best of 3
E1 | Sioux Falls Skyforce | 2
E4 | Westchester Knicks | 0
E2 | Maine Red Claws | 0
E3 | Canton Charge | 2
W1 | Reno Bighorns | 1
W4 | Los Angeles D-Fenders | 2
W2 | Austin Spurs | 2
W3 | Rio Grande Valley Vipers | 1

Semifinals; April 12–19; Best of 3
E1 | Sioux Falls Skyforce | 2
E3 | Canton Charge | 0
W4 | Los Angeles D-Fenders | 2
W2 | Austin Spurs | 1

Finals; April 24, April 26 & April 27; Best of 3
E1 | Sioux Falls Skyforce | 2
W4 | Los Angeles D-Fenders | 1

=== Finals boxscore ===
April 24, 2016
6:00 p.m. CT

Boxscore

Sioux Falls Skyforce 104, Los Angeles D-Fenders 99
Scoring by quarter: 21–22, 30–23, 24–23, 29–31
| Pts: Rodney McGruder 30; Rebs: Rodney McGruder 11; Asts: DeAndre Liggins 8 | Pts: Vander Blue 31; Rebs: Justin Harper 7 Asts: Josh Magette 8 |

Toyota Sports Center, El Segundo, California
Attendance: 550
Referees:
- #14 JB DeRosa
- #26 Brett Nansel
- #70 Aaron Smith

April 26, 2016
7:00 p.m. CT

Boxscore

Los Angeles D-Fenders 109, Sioux Falls Skyforce 102
Scoring by quarter: 27–26, 25–27, 28–26, 29–23
| Pts: Vander Blue 29; Rebs: Ryan Gomes 11; Asts: Josh Magette 10 | Pts: Greg Whittington 17; Rebs: DeAndre Liggins 10; Asts: DeAndre Liggins 6 |

Sanford Pentagon, Sioux Falls, South Dakota
Attendance: 3,250
Referees:
- #39 CJ Washington
- #45 Ray Acosta
- #48 Vladimir Voyard-Tadal

April 27, 2016
7:00 p.m. CT

Boxscore

Los Angeles D-Fenders 63, Sioux Falls Skyforce 91
Scoring by quarter: 17–22, 18–20, 13–27, 15–22
| Pts: Josh Magette 21; Rebs: D.J. Shumpert 8 Asts: Josh Magette 3 | Pts: Jarnell Stokes 25; Rebs: Jarnell Stokes 12; Asts: DeAndre Liggins 6 |
Sioux Falls wins series, 2–1

Sanford Pentagon, Sioux Falls, South Dakota
Attendance: 3,016
Referees:
- #26 Brett Nansel
- #39 CJ Washington
- #45 Ray Acosta

== Awards and honors ==
- NBA Development League Most Valuable Player Award: Jarnell Stokes, Sioux Falls Skyforce
- Dennis Johnson Coach of the Year Award: Dan Craig, Sioux Falls Skyforce
- NBA Development League Rookie of the Year Award: Quinn Cook, Canton Charge
- NBA Development League Defensive Player of the Year Award: DeAndre Liggins, Sioux Falls Skyforce
- NBA Development League Impact Player of the Year Award: Ryan Gomes, Los Angeles D-Fenders
- NBA Development League Most Improved Player Award: Axel Toupane, Raptors 905
- Executive of the Year: Adam Simon, Sioux Falls Skyforce
- Jason Collier Sportsmanship Award: Scott Suggs, Raptors 905
- Development Champion Award:
- All-Star Game MVP: Jimmer Fredette, Westchester Knicks
- All-NBA Development League Team

First team

- Erick Green, Reno Bighorns
- Vander Blue, Los Angeles D-Fenders
- Jarnell Stokes, Sioux Falls Skyforce
- Jeff Ayres, Idaho Stampede/Los Angeles D-Fenders
- Alex Stepheson, Iowa Energy

Second team

- Jimmer Fredette, Westchester Knicks
- Will Cummings, Rio Grande Valley Vipers
- Coty Clarke, Maine Red Claws
- Nick Minnerath, Canton Charge
- DeAndre Liggins, Sioux Falls Skyforce

Third team

- Sean Kilpatrick, Delaware 87ers
- Quinn Cook, Canton Charge
- Devin Ebanks, Grand Rapids Drive
- Ryan Gomes, Los Angeles D-Fenders
- Jordan Bachynski, Westchester Knicks
