= List of NBA G League career scoring leaders =

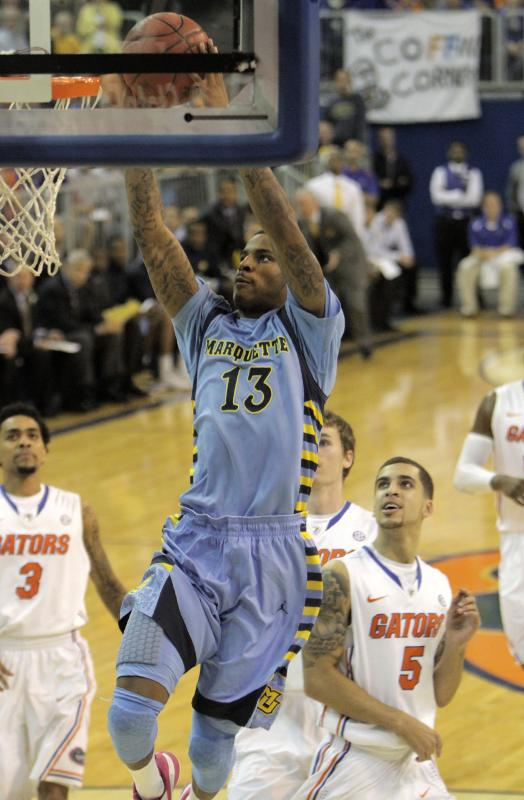
Vander Blue ranks 2nd on the NBA G League's all-time scoring list.

The following is a list of the players who have scored the most points during their NBA G League (formerly NBA Developmental League) careers; only points scored during regular season games are included.

Renaldo Major is the G League's all-time leading scorer and has held the title at multiple points; in early 2014, Ron Howard surpassed Major in total points. Major later reclaimed the title on December 5, 2014, surpassing Howard's career total of 4,325. Major would play his final G League (Note: then known as the D-League) game in 2017, finishing with 5,058 career points. David Stockton has the most career points scored (3,969) among players who are considered active by Basketball-Reference.

== Scoring leaders ==
Statistics accurate as of March 12, 2025.

*	Active NBA G League player
↑	Player actively called up to the NBA

Rank	Player	Position(s)	Team(s) played for (years)	Total points	Games played	Points per game average (Note: Average is rounded to the nearest tenth)
1	Renaldo Major	Small forward	Dakota Wizards (2006–2011); Bakersfield Jam (2011–2016); Reno Bighorns (2016–2017)	5,058	400	12.6
2	Vander Blue	Shooting guard	Delaware 87ers (2014); Maine Red Claws (2014); Idaho Stampede (2014); Los Angeles D-Fenders (2014–2017); South Bay Lakers (2017–2018); Wisconsin Herd (2018–2019); Texas Legends (2019); Santa Cruz Warriors (2019)	4,845	239	20.3
3	Andre Ingram	Shooting guard	Utah Flash (2007–2011); Los Angeles D-Fenders / South Bay Lakers (2012, 2013–2016, 2017–2023)	4,536	474	9.6
4	Elijah Millsap	Small forward / shooting guard	Tulsa 66ers (2010–2011); Los Angeles D-Fenders (2011–2013, 2014); Bakersfield Jam (2014–2015); Northern Arizona Suns (2016–2017); Iowa Wolves (2017–2018); College Park Skyhawks (2022)	4,392	253	17.4
5	Ron Howard	Small forward / shooting guard	Fort Wayne Mad Ants (2007–2010, 2011–2014)	4,325	247	17.5
6	David Stockton*	Point guard	Reno Bighorns (2014–2018); South Bay Lakers (2019–2020); Memphis Hustle (2020–2022); Fort Wayne Mad Ants (2022–2023); Valley Suns (2024–present)	3,969	244	16.3
7	Blake Ahearn	Point guard	Dakota Wizards (2007–2008, 2008–2009); Austin Toros (2008); Bakersfield Jam (2010); Erie BayHawks (2010, 2010–2011); Reno Bighorns (2011–2012); Santa Cruz Warriors (2015)	3,889	195	19.9
8	Justin Dentmon	Point guard	Texas Legends (2010–2011, 2013, 2015, 2017–2019); Austin Toros (2011–2013)	3,839	176	21.8
9	Xavier Munford	Point guard	Bakersfield Jam (2014–2016); Greensboro Swarm (2016–2017); Wisconsin Herd (2017–2019); Delaware Blue Coats (2019–2020)	3,761	209	18.0
10	Desmon Farmer	Shooting guard	Tulsa 66ers (2005–2006, 2007); Rio Grande Valley Vipers (2007–2008); Reno Bighorns (2009–2010, 2013)	3,758	191	19.7

== See also ==
- List of NBA regular season records

== External media ==
- Renaldo Major scores 26 to become NBA D-League's all-time leading scorer! – via the NBA G League's YouTube channel
