= Will Weaver (basketball) =

American basketball coach (born 1984)

Brisbane Bullets
- Position: Head coach / president of basketball operations
- League: NBL

Personal information
- Born: July 21, 1984 (age 42) Austin, Texas, U.S.

Career information
- College: Texas
- Coaching career: 2006–present

Career history

Coaching
- 2006–2010: Texas Longhorns (assistant)
- 2010–2012: Sam Houston State (assistant)
- 2013–2016: Philadelphia 76ers (assistant)
- 2016–2018: Brooklyn Nets (assistant)
- 2018–2019: Long Island Nets
- 2019–2020: Sydney Kings
- 2020–2022: Houston Rockets (assistant)
- 2022–2023: Paris Basketball
- 2023–2024: Brooklyn Nets (assistant)
- 2025–2026: Charlotte Hornets (coaching advisor)
- 2026–present: Brisbane Bullets

Career highlights
- NBA G League Coach of the Year (2019)

William Weaver (born July 21, 1984) is an American professional basketball coach who is the head coach and president of basketball operations for the Brisbane Bullets of the Australian National Basketball League (NBL). He began his coaching career at the collegiate level in 2006 and made his debut as an assistant in the National Basketball Association (NBA) in 2013 with the Philadelphia 76ers. He spent three years with the 76ers and two with the Brooklyn Nets before earning NBA G League Coach of the Year honors with the Long Island Nets in 2019. He spent the 2019–20 season in Australia as head coach of the Sydney Kings before returning to the NBA with the Houston Rockets. In 2022–23, he served as head coach of Paris Basketball.

== Early life ==
Weaver is a native of Austin, Texas. He earned his bachelor's degree in Philosophy from the University of Texas in three years while serving as an assistant coach and head freshman coach at St. Andrew's Episcopal School in Austin. He taught and coached at St. Andrew's in 2005 before coming back to Texas to get his Master's degree in Kinesiology the next Fall.

== Coaching career ==
=== Texas Longhorns (2006–2010) ===
Weaver joined the Texas Longhorns in 2006 as a graduate volunteer before being promoted to graduate assistant in 2007 and special assistant in 2009. He helped the Longhorns to a 103–39 (.725) record in his four years with the program.

=== Sam Houston State (2010–2012) ===
Weaver spent two years as an assistant coach at Sam Houston State University with the Bearkats men's team in 2010–11 and 2011–12.

=== Philadelphia 76ers (2013–2016) ===
Between 2013 and 2016, Weaver spent three seasons with the Philadelphia 76ers, first as a video coordinator and basketball operations assistant and later as a special assistant to head coach Brett Brown for his last two seasons with the club.

=== Brooklyn Nets (2016–2018) ===
Between 2016 and 2018, Weaver spent two seasons with the Brooklyn Nets as special assistant to head coach Kenny Atkinson.

=== Long Island Nets (2018–2019) ===
In July 2018, Weaver was named head coach of the Long Island Nets of the NBA G League. In the 2018–19 season, he led Long Island to the G League Finals, where they lost to the Rio Grande Valley Vipers. He was subsequently named the NBA G League Coach of the Year.

=== Sydney Kings (2019–2020) ===
On March 22, 2019, Weaver was named head coach of the Sydney Kings of the Australian National Basketball League (NBL). In the 2019–20 NBL season, he guided the Kings to first place in the regular season and a grand final series berth, where they lost the series 2–1 to the Perth Wildcats after deciding to not continue after game three due to the COVID-19 pandemic.

=== Houston Rockets (2020–2022) ===
On November 30, 2020, Weaver was hired by the Houston Rockets as an assistant coach. He parted ways with the Rockets in May 2022.

=== Paris Basketball (2022–2023) ===
On July 22, 2022, Weaver was named head coach of Paris Basketball of the French LNB Pro A. He left the club after one season.

=== Second stint with Brooklyn Nets (2023–2024) ===
On June 20, 2023, Weaver re-joined the Brooklyn Nets as an assistant coach. He left following the 2023–24 season.

=== Charlotte Hornets (2025–2026) ===
On August 18, 2025, Weaver was hired by the Charlotte Hornets to serve as a coaching advisor under head coach Charles Lee.

=== Brisbane Bullets (2026–present) ===
On March 11, 2026, Weaver was named head coach and president of basketball operations for the Brisbane Bullets of the Australian NBL.

== National team career ==
In 2014, Weaver joined the Australia men's national basketball team as an assistant coach. He remained in the role as of 2018, being part of the staff at the 2016 Rio Olympics. In 2020, Weaver served as acting head coach during the Asia Cup qualifiers in the absence of Brett Brown.
