= Scott King (basketball) =

American basketball coach (born 1992)

San Antonio Spurs
- Title: Assistant coach
- League: NBA

Personal information
- Born: January 27, 1992 (age 34) Derry, New Hampshire, U.S wife: Claudia King (m. 2023)
- Listed height: 6 ft 9 in (2.06 m)

Career information
- High school: Holderness School (Holderness, New Hampshire)
- College: Stony Brook (2012–2015); Fairfield (2015–2016)
- Position: Forward
- Coaching career: 2022–present

Career history

Coaching
- 2022–2024: New York Knicks (assistant)
- 2024–2025: Austin Spurs
- 2025—present: San Antonio Spurs (assistant)

Career highlights
- NBA G League Coach of the Year (2025)

Scott King (born January 27, 1992) is an American professional basketball coach who is an assistant coach for the San Antonio Spurs of the National Basketball Association (NBA). He was recently the head coach of the Austin Spurs of the NBA G League.

== Early life and playing career ==
A native of Derry, New Hampshire, King attended the Holderness School in Holderness. He graduated from Holderness in 2010.

Standing at 6 feet 9 inches (2.06 m), King played college basketball as a forward. He first played for three years at Stony Brook from 2012 to 2015, before transferring to Fairfield University, where he played for the Stags for his senior season.

== Coaching career ==
After his playing career, King went into coaching. He began his coaching career as a video intern for the Fort Wayne Mad Ants in 2017, and then spent the 2018–19 season in the role with the Detroit Pistons of the National Basketball Association (NBA).

In 2019, he was hired by the New York Knicks as the team's head video coordinator. King was promoted to assistant director of player development prior to the 2022–23 season.

On September 5, 2024, King was named the head coach of the Austin Spurs. King led the Spurs to a 22–12 record in his first year with the team, tied for the Western Conference's best record, and was named the NBA G League Coach of the Year. The Spurs led the league with a top defensive rating (102.3) and recorded the highest victory margin in G League history (+23.5). After defeating the Salt Lake City Stars 123–113 in the conference semifinals, the second-seeded Spurs ended their season losing in the conference finals to the Stockton Kings.

On August 18, 2025, the San Antonio Spurs hired King to serve as an assistant coach under head coach Mitch Johnson.

== College career statistics ==
Year	Team	GP	GS	MPG	FG%	3P%	FT%	RPG	APG	SPG	BPG	PPG
2012–13	Stony Brooks	32	9	8.3	.398	.390	.800	1.1	.3	.1	.3	3.2
2013–14	Stony Brooks	30	1	10.0	.453	.392	.727	1.3	.3	.2	.1	3.2
2014–15	Stony Brooks	26	0	7.9	.343	.308	.682	1.2	.4	.2	.2	3.0
2015–16	Fairfield	24	5	10.8	.444	.250	.600	1.8	.7	.2	.3	3.0
Career		112	15	9.2	.410	.349	.708	1.3	.4	.1	.2	3.1
Statistics gathered from Sports-Reference.

== Head coaching record ==
=== NBA G League ===
Legend
Regular season	G	Games coached	W	Games won	L	Games lost	W–L %	Win–loss %
Playoffs	PG	Playoff games	PW	Playoff wins	PL	Playoff losses	PW–L %	Playoff win–loss %
