= Ron Howard (basketball) =

American basketball player

Personal information
- Born: November 14, 1982 (age 43) Chicago, Illinois, U.S.
- Listed height: 6 ft 5 in (1.96 m)
- Listed weight: 200 lb (91 kg)

Career information
- High school: Whitney Young (Chicago, Illinois)
- College: Marquette (2001–2002); Valparaiso (2003–2006)
- NBA draft: 2006: undrafted
- Playing career: 2007–2019
- Position: Shooting guard / Small forward
- Number: 19

Career history
- 2007: Trigueros de Ciudad Obregón
- 2007–2014: Fort Wayne Mad Ants
- 2010: Marinos de Anzoátegui
- 2010: Barak Netanya
- 2010–2011: Adelaide 36ers
- 2015: Piratas de Quebradillas
- 2015: Seoul Samsung Thunders
- 2016: Élan Béarnais Pau-Lacq-Orthez
- 2016–2017: Busan KT Sonicboom
- 2017: Goyang Orion Orions
- 2017–2018: jeonju KCC Egis
- 2018–2019: Seoul Samsung Thunders

Career highlights
- NBA D-League champion (2014); NBA D-League MVP (2014); NBA D-League Finals MVP (2014); All-NBA D-League First Team (2014); 3× NBA D-League All-Star (2010, 2013, 2014); 2× NBA D-League Sportsmanship Award (2013, 2014); No. 19 retired by Fort Wayne Mad Ants; CIBACOPA champion (2007); CIBACOPA All-Star (2007); 2× Second-team All-MCC (2005, 2006)
- Stats at Basketball Reference

Ron Howard (born November 14, 1982) is an American former professional basketball player. He held the NBA D-League all-time scoring record from March 2014 to December 2014. He is currently fifth all time in most points scored in D-League history, with 4,325 career points across seven seasons with the Fort Wayne Mad Ants.

He led the Mad Ants to the 2014 D-League Championship, was named 2014 D-League MVP, was 2× NBA D-League Sportsmanship Award winner, was selected 2014 All-NBA D-League First Team, and 3× NBA D-League All-Star. Howard is also first player in D-League history to be bestowed the honor of having his number 19 retired by the Mad Ants.

== High school career ==
Howard attended Whitney Young High School in Chicago, Illinois. As a senior, he averaged 17 points and five rebounds per game while earning All-Conference, All-City, All-Area and Special Mention All-State honors.

== College career ==
As a freshman at Marquette, Howard played alongside future NBA players Dwyane Wade and Travis Diener. In 9 games, he averaged just 1.8 points per game.

In 2002, he transferred to Valparaiso and subsequently sat out the 2002–03 season due to NCAA transfer rules.

As a sophomore, he played 19 games, averaging 5.8 points, 1.6 rebounds and 1.4 assists per game.

As a junior, he earned second team All-Conference honors, as well as winning the Dick Koenig Assist Award and the Homer W. Drew Sr. Memorial Most Improved Player Award. In 31 games. he averaged 13.8 points, 4.4 rebounds, 3.7 assists and 1.4 steals per game.

As a senior, he again earned second team All-Conference honors. In 29 games, he averaged 13.1 points, 3.5 rebounds, 3.4 assists and 1.4 steals per game.

== Professional career ==
=== 2006–07 season ===
Howard went undrafted in the 2006 NBA draft. In October 2006, he joined the Hanzevast Capitals of the Netherlands for a try-out but was unsuccessful and left the next month.

In early 2007, he joined Trigueros de Ciudad Obregón of Mexico for the 2007 CIBACOPA season. As well as being an All-Star, he helped Trigueros win the 2007 championship.

=== 2007–08 season ===
On November 1, 2007, Howard was selected by the Fort Wayne Mad Ants in the 7th round of the 2007 NBA D-League Draft.

=== 2008–09 season ===
On September 29, 2008, Howard signed with the Milwaukee Bucks. However, he was later waived by the Bucks on October 20, 2008. Later that month, he was re-acquired by the Mad Ants.

=== 2009–10 season ===
In July 2009, Howard joined the New York Knicks for the 2009 NBA Summer League. On September 24, 2009, he signed with the Knicks. However, he was later waived by the Knicks on October 7, 2009. In November 2009, he was re-acquired by the Mad Ants. In March 2010, he left the Mad Ants. In April 2010, he signed with Marinos de Anzoátegui for the 2010 LPB season.

=== 2010–11 season ===
In July 2010, Howard re-joined the New York Knicks for the 2010 NBA Summer League. In September 2010, he signed with Barak Netanya of Israel for the 2010–11 season. In November 2010, he left Netanya after just 3 games. On December 15, 2010, he signed with the Adelaide 36ers for the rest of the 2010–11 NBL season. On February 23, 2011, he was released by the 36ers due to an ankle injury. In 11 games, he averaged 8.8 points, 2.1 rebounds and 1.4 assists per game.

On March 14, 2011, he was re-acquired by the Mad Ants.

=== 2011–12 season ===
On September 20, 2011, Howard was re-acquired by the Mad Ants. On December 10, 2011, he again signed with the Milwaukee Bucks. However, he was later waived by the Bucks on December 19, 2011. He then returned to the Mad Ants.

=== 2012–13 season ===
In October 2012, Howard was re-acquired by the Mad Ants. On February 4, 2013, Howard was named to the Futures All-Star roster for the 2013 NBA D-League All-Star Game. On April 16, 2013, he received the 2013 NBA D-League Jason Collier Sportsmanship Award.

=== 2013–14 season ===
In July 2013, Howard joined the Indiana Pacers for the Orlando Summer League (did not play for them) and the NBA D-League Select Team for the Las Vegas Summer League. On September 10, 2013, he signed with the Pacers but was later waived on October 17, 2013. In November 2013, he was re-acquired by the Fort Wayne Mad Ants.

On February 3, 2014, Howard was named to the Prospects All-Star roster for the 2014 NBA D-League All-Star Game. On March 29, 2014, in a game against the Springfield Armor, Howard broke the NBA D-League career scoring record, surpassing the previous mark by Renaldo Major (4,252 points). Howard finished the game with 20 points, bringing the new record to 4,261.

On April 18, 2014, he received the 2014 NBA D-League Jason Collier Sportsmanship Award. Six days later, Howard and Othyus Jeffers were named the co-MVPs of the NBA D-League for the 2013–14 season. On April 26, the Mad Ants claimed their first D-League championship as they defeated the Santa Cruz Warriors 2–0.

Howard completed the 2013–14 season with 4,324 career points. In December 2014, Renaldo Major re-claimed the scoring record.

=== 2014–15 season ===
In July 2014, Howard re-joined the NBA D-League Select Team for the 2014 NBA Summer League. On March 3, 2015, he signed with Piratas de Quebradillas of Puerto Rico for the 2015 BSN season.

=== 2015–16 season ===
In July 2015, Howard was selected by the Seoul Samsung Thunders with the final pick in the 2015 Korean Basketball League draft. In December 2015, he parted ways with Seoul after appearing in 27 games. Over that time, he averaged 7.1 points, 1.5 rebounds and 2.0 assists per game.

=== 2016–19 seasons ===
On November 6, 2016, Howard signed with French team Élan Béarnais Pau-Lacq-Orthez as an injury replacement for Yannick Bokolo. He appeared in five games for the team before Bokolo returned to the line-up in early December. Later in his career, from 2016 to 2019, Howard played professionally for the Busan KT Sonicboom, Goyang Orion Orions, jeonju KCC Egis, and the Seoul Samsung Thunders.

== Jersey retirement ==
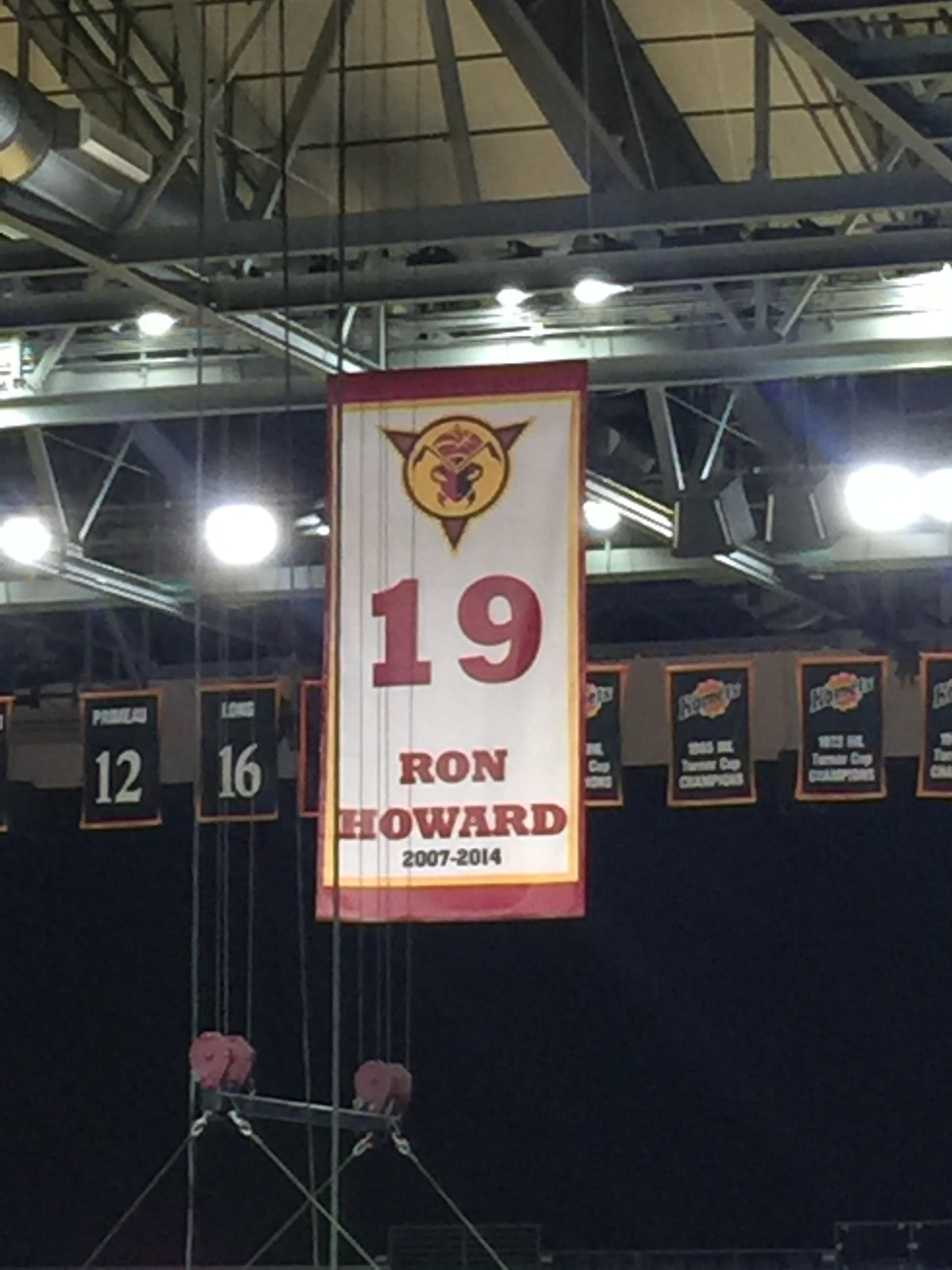
Howard's No. 19 jersey hanging in the rafters at Fort Wayne's Memorial Coliseum.

On March 3, 2017, Howard had his No. 19 jersey retired by the Mad Ants, at halftime of the team's 106–94 win over the Westchester Knicks at Memorial Coliseum. Howard, who led the Mad Ants to the 2014 D-League Championship, was named 2014 Co-MVP of the league, was 2× NBA D-League Sportsmanship Award winner, 2014 All-NBA D-League First Team, and 3× NBA D-League All-Star, is the first player in D-League history to be bestowed the honor.

== Personal ==
Howard is the son of Lorri Howard and Isom Bearden. Howard graduated Valparaiso in May 2005 with a degree in communications and also studied Sports Administration in their graduate program.

== Career statistics ==
Legend
GP	Games played	GS	Games started	MPG	Minutes per game
FG%	Field goal percentage	3P%	3-point field goal percentage	FT%	Free throw percentage
RPG	Rebounds per game	APG	Assists per game	SPG	Steals per game
BPG	Blocks per game	PPG	Points per game	**Bold**	Career high
*	Led the league

†	Denotes seasons in which Howard's team won the D-League championship

=== Fort Wayne Mad Ants ===
==== Regular season ====
Year	Team	GP	GS	MPG	FG%	3P%	FT%	RPG	APG	SPG	BPG	PPG
2007–08	Fort Wayne	47	37	28.6	**.521**	.143	.797	2.9	1.8	1.3	.1	11.2
2008–09	Fort Wayne	48	43	**36.1**	.497	.000	.760	**4.6**	2.4	1.2	**.2**	18.7
2009–10	Fort Wayne	29	29	36.0	.464	**.385**	.796	4.1	2.9	1.2	.1	**20.6**
2010–11	Fort Wayne	8	1	28.1	.493	.267	.680	4.1	1.8	1.0	.0	11.1
2011–12	Fort Wayne	31	27	32.9	.477	.346	.790	4.1	2.7	1.4	**.2**	17.5
2012–13	Fort Wayne	35	32	34.4	.459	.278	**.847**	4.1	**4.7**	1.4	.1	19.1
2013–14†	Fort Wayne	**49**	**49**	34.5	.473	.280	.834	4.3	4.3	**1.6**	.0	20.5
**Career**		247	218	33.4	.481	.324	.804	4.0	3.1	1.3	0.1	17.5

==== Playoffs ====
Year	Team	GP	GS	MPG	FG%	3P%	FT%	RPG	APG	SPG	BPG	PPG
2013	Fort Wayne	2	0	25.5	.481	-	**.913**	3.0	1.5	1.5	.0	**23.5**
2014†	Fort Wayne	**6**	**6**	**33.3**	**.517**	.000	.694	**4.8**	**5.2**	**2.5**	**.3**	19.2
**Playoff Career**		8	6	31.4	.509	.000	.780	4.4	4.3	2.3	0.3	20.3
