= Courtney M. Charles =

Canadian basketball executive

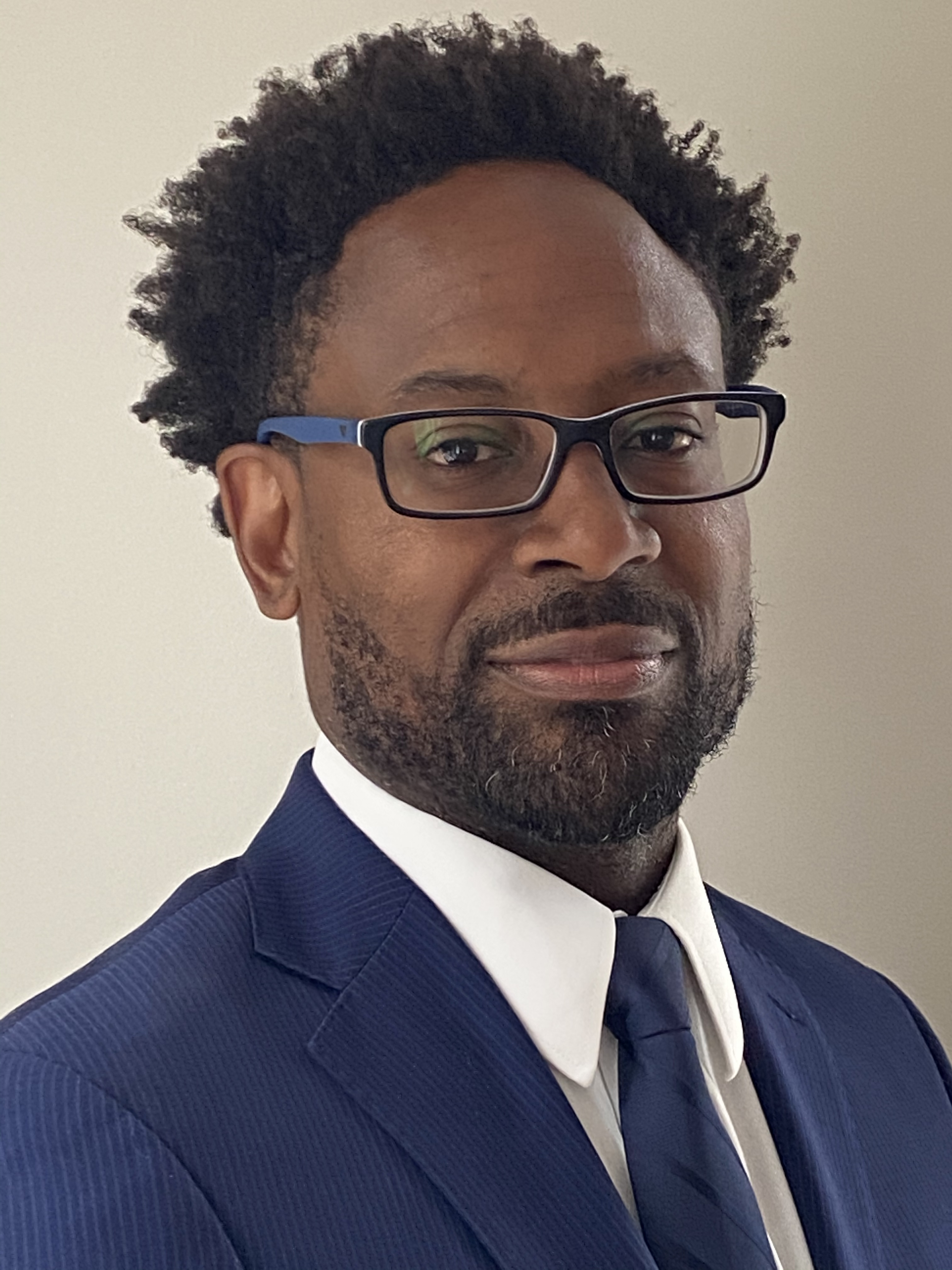

Career information
- College: Marshall University (2004 – 2006); Lewis University (1999 – 2002)
- Position: Vice-President, Basketball and Franchise Operations, Raptors 905 (2020–2026); Director, Basketball Operations and Player Development, Toronto Raptors (2015 – 2020)

Career highlights
- NBA: 2019 NBA Champion; Lewis University NCAA All-American: Holds record in 55-meter indoor dash (6.37s); 200-meter indoor dash (21.86s); 100-meter outdoor dash (10.37s); 200-meter outdoor dash (20.85s)

Courtney M. Charles is a Canadian-born basketball executive who most recently worked as the vice-president of basketball and franchise operations for the Raptors 905, the NBA G League affiliate of the Toronto Raptors. Charles oversaw business operations, basketball affairs and long-term strategic planning for the team.

== Education ==
Charles was an NCAA All-American track and field athlete while attending Lewis University in Romeoville, IL where he completed his bachelor's degree in business administration-management. He went on to complete his master's degree in science, health and physical education at Marshall University in Huntington, West Virginia.

=== Athletic career ===
As a student-athlete, Charles won six Great Lakes Valley Conference (GLVC) titles in indoor and outdoor track, was also the GLVC Track Athlete of the Year at the 2000 GLVC Outdoor Championships, and won the 55 meters at the 2001 GLVC Indoor Championships. He also won back-to-back championships in the 200 meters in 2000 and 2001 and was the 100-meter champion at the GLVC Outdoor meet in 2000. He won first place in the 200 meters in 2000 and 2001.

His All-American accolades include NCAA Outdoor Track and Field Championships in 2000 in the 100 meters and another championship in 2001 in the 200 meters as a member of the 4x400 meter relay team that finished second in the event. Charles holds the school records in the 55-meter indoor dash with a time of 6.37 seconds, the 200-meter indoor dash with 21.86 seconds, the 100-meter outdoor dash with 10.37 seconds, and the 200-meter outdoor dash with 20.85 seconds. He graduated in 2002.

At Marshall University, Charles worked as a graduate assistant and a sprint coach of the women's track and field team. He was recruited to Marshall by Canadian coach, Francis Sealy. Charles spent two years at Marshall from 2004 to 2006.

== Executive career ==
Charles has held various roles in the NBA with the Toronto Raptors. He started as an intern and worked his way up the ranks.

=== Toronto Raptors ===
Charles came to the Raptors as an overqualified intern in 2006 with a master's degree. He has shared his perspective on the importance of sports internships for Canadian youth on Rogers TV. After completing his internship with the Raptors, Charles stayed on staff and worked within the front office in basketball operations.

When Rob Babcock was let go by the Raptors, Charles had the opportunity to see Wayne Embry as the interim general manager of the team. Charles worked closely with Embry during this time.

In 2014, Charles was promoted to Director of Player Development and Operations focusing on player on-boarding, financial planning, team marketing, community initiatives and sponsorships.

In 2019, Charles became an NBA Champion when the Toronto Raptors defeated the Golden State Warriors in the 2019 NBA Finals. He has said that winning the NBA title allowed people to see how diverse Toronto's front office had become, led by the efforts of Raptors President Masai Ujiri.

==== Raptors 905 ====
Charles was promoted to vice-president of Raptors 905 in July 2020. He become one of few Black high-level front office executives in the NBA.

Charles has said that he wants 905 to produce the best players for the NBA and the Raptors.

On September 17, 2026, it was reported that Charles would be departing the Raptors organization.

=== Retail Experience ===
At the age of 16, Charles started working in the hospitality industry, specifically in retail and sales at McDonalds and Walmart. He has been quoted explaining how his retail experience helped him manage player interaction and development in the NBA.

== Personal ==
He served as a Lululemon ambassador and was also a member on the board of directors for East Metro Youth Services. Charles has been a speaker for Lean in Canada, a community of professional women empowering each other to build their careers.

Charles has worked in the community with at-risk youth, speaking of his career journey and the changes he needed to make. He also serves on the board of directors for Fifty For Free, a not-for-profit organization in Toronto, Canada, founded by Jermaine Anderson, that serves Canadian youth.

Charles has two sons and currently resides in Toronto.
