= Elijah Millsap =

American basketball player (born 1987)

Personal information
- Born: August 12, 1987 (age 39) Grambling, Louisiana, U.S.
- Listed height: 6 ft 6 in (1.98 m)
- Listed weight: 215 lb (98 kg)

Career information
- High school: Grambling (Grambling, Louisiana)
- College: Louisiana (2006–2008); UAB (2009–2010)
- NBA draft: 2010: undrafted
- Playing career: 2010–2022
- Position: Shooting guard / small forward

Career history
- 2010–2011: Tulsa 66ers
- 2011–2013: Los Angeles D-Fenders
- 2013: Petron Blaze Boosters
- 2014: Maccabi Ashdod
- 2014: Los Angeles D-Fenders
- 2014–2015: Bakersfield Jam
- 2015–2016: Utah Jazz
- 2016: Maccabi Tel Aviv
- 2016: San Miguel Beermen
- 2016–2017: Northern Arizona Suns
- 2017: Phoenix Suns
- 2017–2018: Iowa Wolves
- 2018–2019: CB Breogán
- 2022: College Park Skyhawks

Career highlights
- NBA D-League All-Star (2012); All-NBA D-League Second Team (2012); NBA D-League All-Rookie Second Team (2011); First-team All-Conference USA (2010); Sun Belt Freshman of the Year (2007)
- Stats at NBA.com
- Stats at Basketball Reference

Elijah Millsap (born August 12, 1987) is an American former professional basketball player who played briefly in the National Basketball Association (NBA) and other leagues. He played college basketball for the University of Louisiana at Lafayette and the University of Alabama at Birmingham.

== High school career ==
Millsap attended Grambling High School, averaging 29.8 points and 14.5 rebounds as a senior, earning the MVP on the Louisiana Class A ranks.

== College career ==
Millsap attended Louisiana–Lafayette, playing in 53 games and starting 40 while averaging 9.4 points, 5.4 rebounds and 1.5 steals as a sophomore. After two years, he transferred to Alabama-Birmingham, where he averaged 16.1 points per game as a senior, earning an All-Conference USA selection.

== Professional career ==
=== Tulsa 66ers (2010–2011) ===
After going undrafted in the 2010 NBA draft, Millsap joined the Detroit Pistons for the 2010 NBA Summer League. On September 26, he signed with the Oklahoma City Thunder. However, he was later waived by the Thunder on October 20. On October 30, he was acquired by the Tulsa 66ers of the NBA Development League as an affiliate player of the Thunder. He went on to be named to the D-League All-Rookie second team for the 2010–11 season.

=== Los Angeles D-Fenders (2011–2013) ===
On November 28, 2011, Millsap was acquired by the Los Angeles D-Fenders. On December 9, he signed with the Los Angeles Lakers, but was waived on December 22 prior to the start of the regular season. He then re-joined the D-Fenders.

In July 2012, Millsap joined the Atlanta Hawks for the 2012 NBA Summer League. On September 17, he signed with the Shanghai Sharks of the Chinese Basketball Association. However, he was later released by the Sharks in November 2012 in favor of Gilbert Arenas. On December 12, 2012, he was reacquired by the D-Fenders, where he played out the 2012–13 season.

=== Petron Blaze Boosters (2013) ===
In June 2013, Millsap joined the Petron Blaze Boosters of the Philippine Basketball Association for the 2013 Governor's Cup.

=== Maccabi Ashdod (2014) ===
On January 13, 2014, Millsap signed with Maccabi Ashdod for the rest of the 2013–14 season. On March 19, he left Maccabi and returned to the United States.

=== Return to the D-Fenders (2014) ===
On March 29, 2014, Millsap was re-acquired by the Los Angeles D-Fenders.

=== Bakersfield Jam (2014–2015) ===
In July 2014, Millsap joined the Philadelphia 76ers for the 2014 NBA Summer League. On September 27, he signed with the Milwaukee Bucks. However, he was later waived by the Bucks on October 16. On October 30, Millsap was reacquired by the Los Angeles D-Fenders. The next day, he was traded to the Bakersfield Jam.

=== Utah Jazz (2015–2016) ===
On January 5, 2015, Millsap signed a 10-day contract with the Utah Jazz and made his NBA debut that night against the Indiana Pacers. In just over 18 minutes of action, he recorded 2 points, 5 rebounds, 4 assists and 1 steal in a 105–101 loss. On January 15, he signed a second 10-day contract with the Jazz, and on January 25, he signed a multi-year contract with the Jazz.

On January 5, 2016, Millsap was waived by the Jazz.

=== Maccabi Tel Aviv (2016) ===
On January 23, 2016, Millsap signed with Maccabi Tel Aviv of the Israeli League for the rest of the season. On March 10, 2016, he was released by the club after appearing in six games.

=== San Miguel Beermen (2016) ===
On September 15, 2016, Millsap signed with the San Miguel Beermen for the team's 2016 PBA Governors' Cup playoff run. He helped San Miguel reach the semi-finals, where they were defeated 3–2.

=== Northern Arizona Suns (2016–2017) ===
On October 31, 2016, Millsap was acquired by the Northern Arizona Suns of the NBA Development League. With the Suns in 2016–17, Millsap led the team in scoring (19.7 points per game), steals (2.1 per game), minutes (37.0 per game) and double-doubles (13). He was second on the team in rebounding with 7.9 rebounds per game, and third on the team with 4.0 assists per game. He was the only Suns player to start all 50 games, and was one of three players to play in all 50 Northern Arizona games on the year. In their season finale on April 1, Millsap dropped a career-high 38 points on 12-of-24 shooting, including 7-of-12 from distance, against the Reno Bighorns. Millsap scored 30+ points four times and 20+ points 23 times during the season.

=== Phoenix Suns (2017) ===
On April 9, 2017, Millsap was called up from Northern Arizona and signed a multi-year contract with the Phoenix Suns. He made his debut for Phoenix later that day, recording two rebounds and one assist in 12 minutes off the bench in a 124–111 win over the Dallas Mavericks. He would later be cut from the roster on October 14, 2017, as the Suns trimmed their roster down to the newly implemented 17 players.

=== Iowa Wolves (2017–2018) ===
On October 20, 2017, Millsap was traded from the Northern Arizona Suns to the Minnesota Timberwolves's G League affiliate, the Iowa Wolves.

=== CB Breogán (2018–2019) ===
On December 18, 2018, Millsap signed for CB Breogán of the Spanish Liga ACB. On March 19, 2019, Millsap parted ways with Breogan after playing 11 games with the Galician side.

=== College Park Skyhawks (2022) ===
On January 3, 2022, Millsap signed with the College Park Skyhawks of the NBA G League. However, he was waived on January 12 after making three appearances.

== NBA career statistics ==
Legend
GP	Games played	GS	Games started	MPG	Minutes per game
FG%	Field goal percentage	3P%	3-point field goal percentage	FT%	Free throw percentage
RPG	Rebounds per game	APG	Assists per game	SPG	Steals per game
BPG	Blocks per game	PPG	Points per game	**Bold**	Career high

=== Regular season ===
Year	Team	GP	GS	MPG	FG%	3P%	FT%	RPG	APG	SPG	BPG	PPG
2014–15	Utah	**47**	**5**	**19.7**	**.340**	**.311**	.674	**3.2**	**1.2**	**1.2**	**.3**	**5.3**
2015–16	Utah	20	0	8.7	.282	.083	**.722**	1.8	1.0	.4	.2	1.8
2016–17	Phoenix	2	0	11.5	.143	.000	.500	3.0	.5	.0	.0	1.5
Career		69	5	16.2	.327	.279	.679	2.8	1.1	.9	.3	4.2

== Personal life ==
Millsap was born in Grambling, Louisiana. He is the brother of four-time NBA All-Star Paul Millsap. He also has two other brothers who play basketball: John and Abraham.

=== Dennis Lindsey controversy ===
On February 24, 2021, Millsap accused Utah Jazz vice president Dennis Lindsey of making racist comments towards him during a 2015 end-of-season meeting. Lindsey and Jazz head coach Quin Snyder both denied the allegations. On February 26, the NBA launched a probe into the allegations, but on March 15, the league announced that it had been unable to find evidence of the remark being made. Lindsey later stepped down from his position in June 2021.

== See also ==
- List of NBA G League career scoring leaders
