= Westbury Christian School =

Location
- 29.6676456°N 95.495369°W

Information
- Established: February 1975
- Faculty: 44.5
- Enrollment: 465 (2016)
- Website: www.westburychristian.org
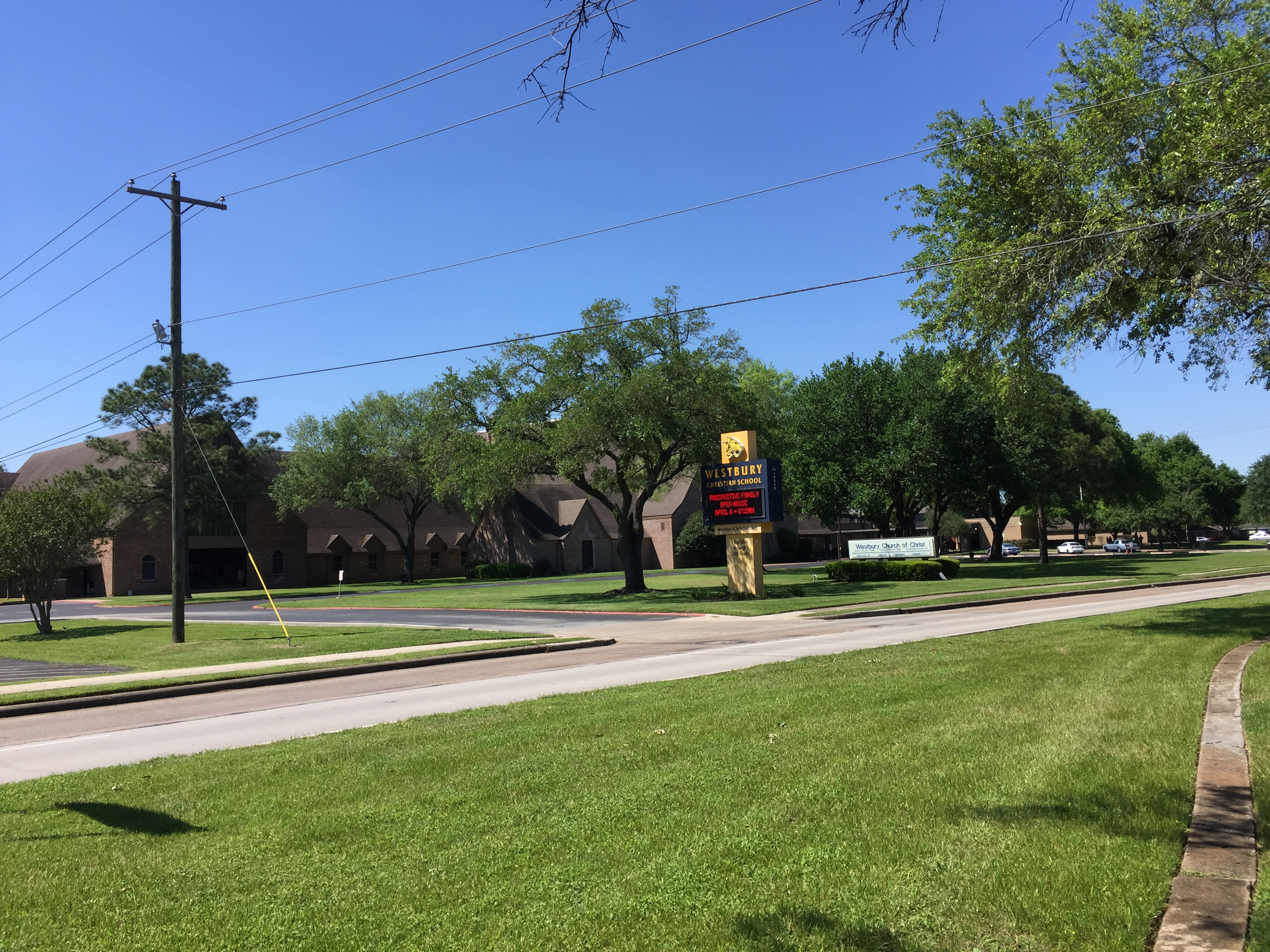
- Last updated: 8 January 2018

Westbury Christian School is a private, co-educational, K3 through 12th grade Christian school located in Houston, Texas, United States.

Westbury Christian School is open to students of all faiths, nationalities, and ethnic origins.

== History ==
Plans for the establishment of Westbury Christian School began in the early 1970s with several families of the Westbury Church of Christ. The school started as a "Mother's Day Out" activity of the church. Soon, demand required that a licensed day care center be started. Following close behind the successful preschool program was demand for adding elementary grades, middle school, and finally the high school. The school was formally chartered in February 1975 with support from the Westbury Church of Christ elders. The school is independently operated by a board of trustees.

== Operations ==
Westbury Christian School is independently operated by a board of trustees. The Westbury congregation donated the use of their facilities to the school since the beginning. The church and the school continue to work together sharing facilities

Westbury Christian School receives no financial assistance from any government body. Income is realized from tuition and fees, plus special fund raisers. Associate groups, like the Wildcat Athletic Boosters, Parent Teacher Organization, and others, raise funds for special projects.

== Accreditation ==
In 1988, Westbury Christian School received accreditation from the Southern Association of Colleges and Schools (SACS), and the National Christian Schools Association (NCSA).

== Athletic tradition ==
Westbury Christian School competes in the Texas Association of Private and Parochial Schools (TAPPS) 5-A district.

The varsity boys' basketball program began in 1981, and since its inception, the Wildcats have won 16 state championships. They are consistently ranked among the top schools, both statewide and nationally, each year.

Heisman trophy winner and former NBA star Charlie Ward, served as the head coach of the varsity football team from 2007 to 2013.

In the 2017–2018 season, varsity football finished district runner up with a record of 7-3 and made it to the playoffs for a second consecutive year.

== Notable alumni ==
- Ndudi Ebi (2003), professional basketball player
- Galen Robinson Jr. (2015), professional basketball player

== International Students I-20 ==
Westbury Christian School is an SEVP-certified institution permitted to issue I-20 visa applications for international students.
