= Nate Pierre-Louis =

American basketball player (born 1998)

- Pierre-Louis with Igokea in 2026

No. 00 – Zenit Saint Petersburg
- Position: Shooting guard
- League: VTB United League

Personal information
- Born: December 23, 1998 (age 27) Plainfield, New Jersey, U.S.
- Listed height: 6 ft 4 in (1.93 m)
- Listed weight: 205 lb (93 kg)

Career information
- High school: St. Peter's (Jersey City, New Jersey); St. Benedict's (Newark, New Jersey); Roselle Catholic (Roselle, New Jersey)
- College: Temple (2017–2020)
- NBA draft: 2020: undrafted
- Playing career: 2021–present

Career history
- 2021–2023: South Bay Lakers
- 2023–2024: Mexico City Capitanes
- 2024: Long Island Nets
- 2024: Iowa Wolves
- 2025: Valley Suns
- 2025: Saskatchewan Rattlers
- 2025: Oberwart Gunners
- 2025–2026: Igokea
- 2026–present: Zenit Saint Petersburg

Career highlights
- NBA G League Sportsmanship Award (2023); AAC Most Improved Player (2019); AAC All-Rookie Team (2018); CEBL assists leader (2025); VTB United League SuperCup All-Tournament Team (2026)
- Stats at NBA.com
- Stats at Basketball Reference

Nathaniel Amir Pierre-Louis (born December 23, 1998) is an American professional basketball player for Zenit Saint Petersburg of the VTB United League. He played college basketball for the Temple Owls.

== High school career ==
After attending St. Peter's Prep in Jersey City, New Jersey and St. Benedict's Prep in Newark, New Jersey, Pierre-Louis attended Roselle Catholic High School in Roselle, New Jersey, where he averaged 15.6 points per game, leading Roselle to an 18–10 record, to the Union County Tournament final and the South Jersey, Non-Public B final.

== College career ==
Pierre-Louis attended Temple coming as a three-star recruit. He played 91 games and averaged 10.9 points, 8.5 rebounds, 3.1 assists and 1.8 steals as a junior before entering the NBA draft.

== Professional career ==
=== South Bay Lakers (2021–2023) ===
After going undrafted in the 2020 NBA draft, Pierre-Louis joined the South Bay Lakers on October 23, 2021, after a tryout, playing 32 games and averaging 9.3 points, 4.5 rebounds, 2.8 assists and 1.7 steals in 27.7 minutes.

In June 2022, Pierre-Louis joined the Los Angeles Lakers for the 2022 NBA Summer League and on October 11, 2022, he signed for them. However, he was waived four days later and on October 22, he returned to South Bay. He played 47 games and averaged 7.3 points, 3.6 rebounds, 1.6 assists and 1.0 steals in 18.4 minutes. On March 29, 2023, he was awarded the Jason Collier Sportsmanship Award.

=== Mexico City Capitanes (2023–2024) ===
On October 30, 2023, Pierre-Louis joined the Mexico City Capitanes where he played 22 games and averaged 4.9 points, 4.8 rebounds, 1.1 assists and 0.8 steals in 18.2 minutes.

=== Long Island Nets (2024) ===
On February 27, 2024, Pierre-Louis was traded to the Long Island Nets where he played 11 games and averaged 3.8 points, 4.1 rebounds, 1.1 assists and 0.8 steals in 15.1 minutes. On November 4, he was waived by Long Island.

=== Iowa Wolves (2024) ===
On November 18, 2024, Pierre-Louis signed with the Iowa Wolves. However, he was waived on November 27.

=== Valley Suns (2025) ===
On February 12, 2025, Pierre-Louis joined the Valley Suns of the NBA G League. During the 2024–25 season, he appeared in 12 regular-season games, averaging 5.4 points, 3.2 rebounds and 1.9 assists per game.

=== Saskatchewan Rattlers (2025) ===
On March 21, 2025, Pierre-Louis signed with the Saskatchewan Rattlers of the Canadian Elite Basketball League (CEBL).

During the 2025 season, he appeared in 18 games, averaging 16.7 points, 5.8 rebounds and 7.7 assists per game. He finished the season with 139 assists, leading the CEBL in total assists and setting a then-single-season league record.

=== Oberwart Gunners (2025) ===
On July 31, 2025, Pierre-Louis joined the Oberwart Gunners of the Austrian Basketball Superliga.

During the 2025–26 Austrian Bundesliga season, he averaged 22.9 points, 4.1 rebounds and 3.2 assists per game in 12 appearances.

=== Igokea (2025–2026) ===
On December 18, 2025, Pierre-Louis left Oberwart and joined Igokea of the ABA League and the Bosnian League.

During the 2025–26 ABA League season, Pierre-Louis averaged 14.2 points, 3.4 rebounds and 3.2 assists per game in 14 appearances.

On January 10, 2026, Pierre-Louis recorded a season-high 29 points against U-BT Cluj-Napoca in a 114–108 victory.

In the 2026 Bosnian championship playoffs, Pierre-Louis averaged 16.8 points, 2.8 rebounds and 3.5 assists per game across four appearances.

Pierre-Louis remained with Igokea for the 2026–27 season, with the club competing in the ABA League and Basketball Champions League (BCL).

In September 2026, he represented Igokea at the VTB United League SuperCup. He scored 14 points 3 steals against CSKA Moscow. He scored 15 points 4 steals against Lokomotiv Kuban points and 16 points in an 83–79 victory over Zenit Saint Petersburg in the fifth-place game. Pierre-Louis was subsequently named to the tournament’s All-Tournament Team.

=== Zenit Saint Petersburg (2026–present) ===
On November 13, 2026, Pierre-Louis signed with Zenit Saint Petersburg of the Russian VTB United League.

== Career statistics ==
Legend
GP	Games played	GS	Games started	MPG	Minutes per game
FG%	Field goal percentage	3P%	3-point field goal percentage	FT%	Free throw percentage
RPG	Rebounds per game	APG	Assists per game	SPG	Steals per game
BPG	Blocks per game	PPG	Points per game	**Bold**	Career high

=== College ===
Year	Team	GP	GS	MPG	FG%	3P%	FT%	RPG	APG	SPG	BPG	PPG
2017–18	Temple	27	1	16.9	**.460**	**.333**	.576	3.0	.6	.9	.3	7.5
2018–19	Temple	**33**	**33**	**34.3**	.459	.310	.667	5.8	2.1	1.6	.3	**13.3**
2019–20	Temple	31	31	32.8	.396	.254	**.685**	**8.5**	**3.1**	**1.8**	**.5**	10.9
Career		91	65	28.6	.437	.298	.659	5.9	2.0	1.5	.4	10.7

== Personal life ==
He majored in psychology.He has a wife, Deanna Pierre-Louis (née Rispoli), married in 2023, they have a two sons together named Neo and Jireh
