= Kansas City Tornadoes =

- League: The Basketball League
- Founded: 2017
- History: Kansas City Tornados; 2018; Kansas City Tornadoes; 2019
- Arena: Hy-Vee Arena
- Location: Kansas City, Missouri
- Team colors
- CEO: Justin Pattison
- Vice-president: Otis Birdsong (COO)
- Head coach: Eddie Corporal

The Kansas City Tornadoes were an American professional basketball team based in Kansas City, Missouri, and members of The Basketball League (TBL).

== History ==
On September 27, 2017, North American Premier Basketball (NAPB) announced a team that will play in Kansas City, Missouri, and Calvin Thompson would be the head coach and general manager. On November 10, the team name was revealed as the KC Buzz as well as naming the assistant coaches and first players signed. On November 20, 2017, Georgia Tech sent a request to the Kansas City team to change the name and logo since they "have the trademark on the bumblebee as well as the word B-U-Z-Z." that is attached to their mascot Buzz. By the end of the month, the NAPB team had changed their moniker to the Tornados, sometimes written as "Tornado's" by their social media.

The Tornados started their inaugural season playing their home games at the Municipal Auditorium. However, by March 2018, the team began playing home games at Avila University due to scheduling issues.

After their inaugural season, the NAPB changed its branding to The Basketball League (TBL). Concurrently, the Tornados rebranded as the grammatically correct Tornadoes. They also announced they were pursuing a new venue and named Eddie Corporal as the head coach. Kevin Loder was named chief operating officer of the team. On July 28, 2018, Loder announced via Facebook Live that the team will be competing at the Hy-Vee Arena.

After the season began, the Tornadoes ran into several scheduling issues leading to canceled and rescheduled games. The team decided to end their season early and sit out of the playoffs despite having the second best record at the time. The team did not return for the 2020 season.

== Roster ==
Kansas City Tornadoes roster
Players
Coaches

Pos.	No.	Nat.	Name	Ht.	Wt.	Age
G		(United States)	Cole, CJ	5 ft 11 in (1.80 m)	190 lb (86 kg)	32 – 12 July 1993
G		(United States)	French, Jacob	6 ft 5 in (1.96 m)	195 lb (88 kg)
G		(United States)	Greenberg, Grant	6 ft 2 in (1.88 m)	195 lb (88 kg)
SF	7	(United States)	Major, Renaldo	6 ft 1 in (1.85 m)	195 lb (88 kg)	43 – 7 May 1982
C	13	(United States)	Manns, Justin	6 ft 11 in (2.11 m)	215 lb (98 kg)	36 – 6 July 1989
G		(United States)	Patterson, Tyshawn	6 ft 1 in (1.85 m)	175 lb (79 kg)	34 – 19 April 1991
C	-	(United States)	Sledge, Travares	6 ft 10 in (2.08 m)	110 lb (50 kg)	33 – 24 April 1992

Head coach

- (United States) Eddie Corporal

Assistant coach(es)

- (United States) Tom Hughes

Legend

- (C) Team captain
- Injured
