= Raptors 905 =

Professional basketball team of the NBA G League based in Mississauga, Canada

- Conference: Eastern
- League: NBA G League
- Founded: 2015
- History: Raptors 905; 2015–present
- Arena: Mississauga Sports and Entertainment Centre; Scotiabank Arena (occasional home games)
- Location: Mississauga, Ontario
- Team colours: Red, black, silver, gold, white
- Vice-president: Courtney M. Charles
- General manager: Scott Brown Jr.
- Head coach: Noah Lewis
- Ownership: Maple Leaf Sports & Entertainment
- Affiliation: Toronto Raptors
- Championships: 1 (2017)
- Conference titles: 2 (2017, 2018)
- Division titles: 1 (2017)
- Website: Raptors905.com

The Raptors 905 are a Canadian professional basketball team in the NBA G League based in Mississauga. They are affiliated with the Toronto Raptors, and play their home games at Mississauga Sports and Entertainment Centre, replacing the venue's former basketball tenant, the Mississauga Power of the National Basketball League of Canada. The team regularly plays approximately 2 to 4 home games at the Scotiabank Arena, the home of their parent club, the Toronto Raptors. The Raptors 905 is the eighth NBA G League team to be owned by an NBA team and the first NBA G League team to be located outside of the United States.

The name "905" refers to the primary local area code of the Golden Horseshoe, as distinguished from the city of Toronto proper, where the primary area code is 416. Thus, "905" (pronounced "nine-oh-five") is a common shorthand referring to the suburbs surrounding Toronto.

== History ==
In 2008, Raptors president and general manager Bryan Colangelo said that Maple Leaf Sports & Entertainment Ltd. (MLSE) was exploring launching an NBA Development League franchise in the Toronto area within a couple of years to serve as a developmental team for the Raptors. Hamilton's Copps Coliseum and Oshawa were reportedly under consideration to host the franchise. Due to the tax and visa complications posed by a Canadian-based franchise, and Rochester, New York, which is just across the United States border, was considered as an alternative.

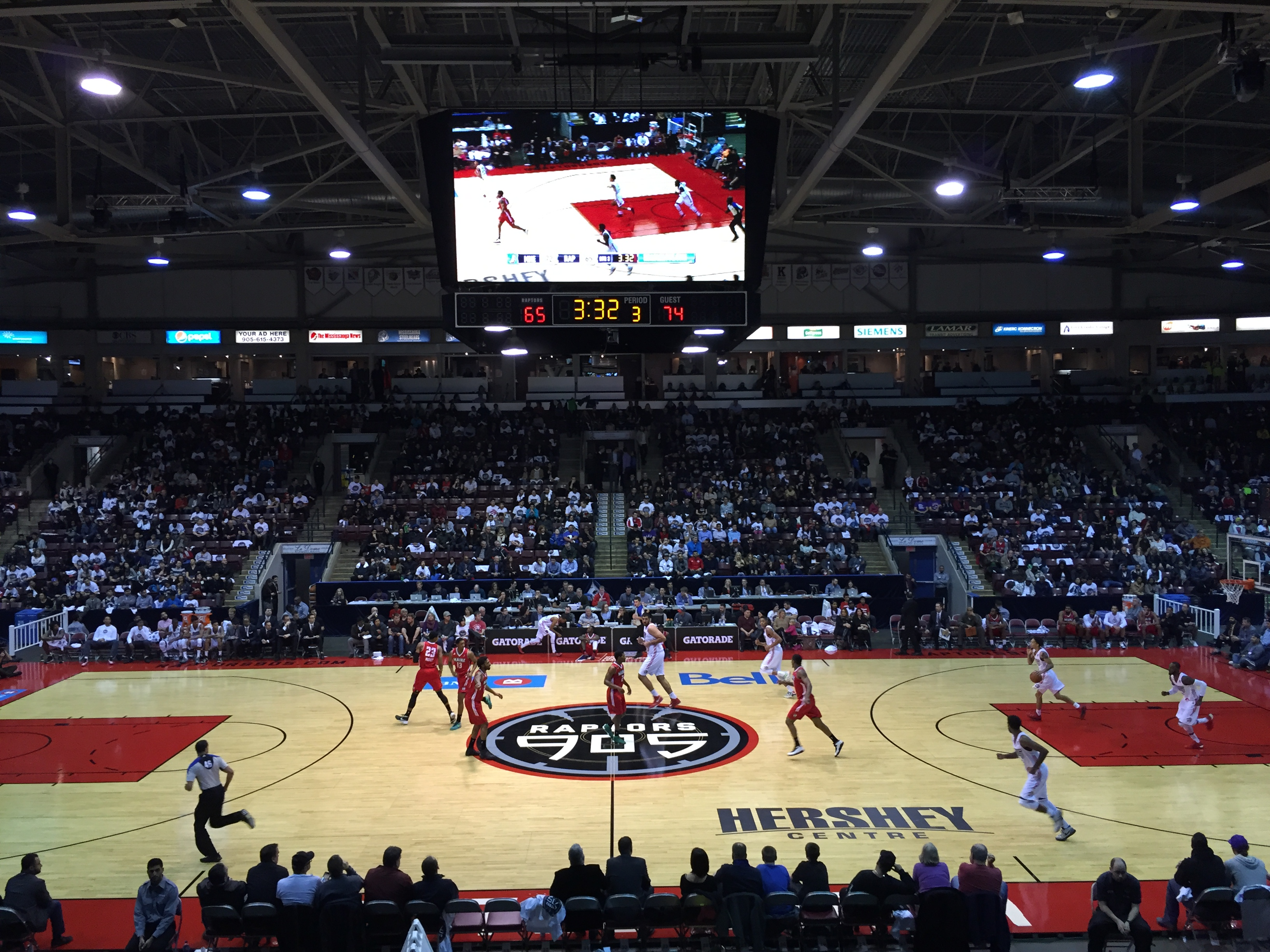
Raptors 905 played their inaugural home game in November 2015 at the Hershey Centre in Mississauga.

In April 2015, Colangelo's replacement Masai Ujiri announced that MLSE's board had approved purchasing a franchise, and that they were in negotiations with the NBA over where the team would play and whether it could be launched in time for the 2015–16 season. In June 2015 MLSE announced that it had purchased a D-League franchise, which would be named the Raptors 905 and begin play that fall at the Hershey Centre in Mississauga, Ontario, a suburb of Toronto. The team is named after the area code used by much of the suburban Greater Toronto Area. The franchise reportedly cost $6 million. An agreement was negotiated with the Mississauga Power of the National Basketball League of Canada, which held the basketball lease at the Hershey Centre, with the Power folding. The team planned to play some games at Toronto's Air Canada Centre, home of their NBA affiliate the Toronto Raptors.

On July 7, 2015, Jesse Mermuys was hired as head coach and Dan Tolzman as general manager. Mermuys left his position as an assistant coach under Toronto Raptors head coach, Dwane Casey. On July 28, 2015, veteran coach Tim Lewis was named lead assistant coach. On November 4, 2015, Raptors 905 unveiled their new uniforms and an alternate logo.

On June 13, 2016, it was reported that Mermuys would leave the 905 for the Los Angeles Lakers, joining them as an assistant coach. In September, the Raptors announced that Jerry Stackhouse would be the head coach of the Raptors 905 team.

In 2016–17, the 905 finished with a 39–11 record (the second-best record in G-League history) clinching their first division title and with a record of 21–4 on the road (a D-League record). Stackhouse was awarded the Coach of the Year, while Center Edy Tavares was awarded Defensive Player of the Year. Making their way to the playoffs as the top seed, they swept the Canton Charge in the first round and then swept the Maine Red Claws in the second, clinching their first conference title. In the finals, they met the Western Conference champion Rio Grande Valley Vipers whom they beat in three games and claimed their first title in franchise history. Pascal Siakam was named the Finals MVP after recording 32 and 17 points in Games 2 and 3 respectively.

In 2024, the city of Mississauga and MLSE partnered to begin construction of a $30 million practice facility next to the Paramount Fine Foods Centre, which was opened in March 2026.

== Season-by-season ==
| Season | Division | Regular season | | | | Postseason results |
| Season | Division | Finish | Wins | Losses | Pct. | Postseason results |
|---|---|---|---|---|---|---|
Raptors 905
| 2015–16 | Atlantic | 5th | 23 | 27 | .460 | |
| 2016–17 | Central | 1st | 39 | 11 | .780 | Won First Round (Canton) 2–0; Won Semifinals (Maine) 2–0; Won Finals (Rio Grande Valley) 2–1 |
| 2017–18 | Atlantic | 2nd | 31 | 19 | .620 | Won First Round (Grand Rapids) 92–88; Won Conf. Semifinal (Westchester) 92–80; Won Conf. Final (Erie) 118–106; Lost Finals (Austin) 0–2 |
| 2018–19 | Atlantic | 3rd | 29 | 21 | .580 | Won First Round (Grand Rapids) 91–90; Lost Conf. Semifinal (Long Island) 99–112 |
| 2019–20 | Atlantic | 3rd | 22 | 21 | .512 | Cancelled due to the COVID-19 pandemic |
| 2020–21 | | 1st | 12 | 3 | .800 | Won Quarterfinal (Ignite) 127–102; Lost Semifinal (Delaware) 100–127 |
| 2021–22 | Eastern | 1st | 24 | 8 | .750 | Won Quarterfinal (Capital City) 131–126; Lost Conference Final (Delaware) 139–143 |
| 2022–23 | Eastern | 10th | 16 | 16 | .500 | |
| 2023–24 | Eastern | 14th | 13 | 21 | .382 | |
| 2024–25 | Eastern | 14th | 13 | 21 | .382 | |
| Regular season record | | | 222 | 168 | .569 | 2015–present |
| Playoff record | | | 11 | 6 | .647 | 2015–present |

== Current roster ==
Raptors 905 roster
Players

| Pos. | No. | Player | Height | Weight | DOB | From |
|---|---|---|---|---|---|---|
| G | 83 | Olumide Adelodun | 6 ft 5 in (1.96 m) | 215 lb (98 kg) | 2003-07-16 | Niagara |
| C | 12 | Nate Bittle (TW) | 7 ft 0 in (2.13 m) | 215 lb (98 kg) | 2003-06-03 | Oregon |
| G | 25 | Nimari Burnett | 6 ft 5 in (1.96 m) | 195 lb (88 kg) | 2001-12-20 | Michigan |
| F | 24 | Tyson Degenhart | 6 ft 8 in (2.03 m) | 235 lb (107 kg) | 2002-10-13 | Boise State |
| G | 20 | Chucky Hepburn | 6 ft 0 in (1.83 m) | 190 lb (86 kg) | 2003-02-09 | Louisville |
| G | 11 | A. J. Hoggard | 6 ft 3 in (1.91 m) | 220 lb (100 kg) | 2000-09-25 | Vanderbilt |
| G/F | 44 | Andre Jackson Jr. | 6 ft 6 in (1.98 m) | 210 lb (95 kg) | 13-11-2001 | Connecticut |
| C | 50 | Trey Jemison | 6 ft 10 in (2.08 m) | 270 lb (122 kg) | 1999-11-28 | UAB |
| G | 5 | Tyreke Key | 6 ft 1 in (1.85 m) | 207 lb (94 kg) | 1998-10-29 | Tennessee |
| G | 9 | Kevin McCullar Jr. (TW) | 6 ft 6 in (1.98 m) | 210 lb (95 kg) | 2001-03-15 | Kansas |
| G/F | 27 | Caleb Stone-Carrawell | 6 ft 7 in (2.01 m) | 220 lb (100 kg) | 2000-11-25 | Loyola Marymount |
| G | 18 | Malachi Smith (TW) | 6 ft 4 in (1.93 m) | 205 lb (93 kg) | 1999-12-06 | Gonzaga |
| C | 33 | Jamarion Sharp | 7 ft 5 in (2.26 m) | 235 lb (107 kg) | 2001-08-26 | Mississippi |

Coaches
Head coach
- Drew Jones
Assistant(s)
- Matt Gray
- Joshua Henderson
- Arsalan Jamil
- Brandon Leftwich
- Justin Serresse

Legend
- (DP) Unsigned draft pick
- (FA) Free agent
- (S) Suspended
- (P) Prospects
- (NBA) On assignment from NBA affiliate
- (TW) Two-way affiliate player
- Injured

Roster
Updated: October 27, 2026

== Head coaches ==
| # | Head coach | Term | Regular season | | | | Playoffs | | | | Achievements |
| # | Head coach | Term | G | W | L | Win% | G | W | L | Win% | Achievements |
|---|---|---|---|---|---|---|---|---|---|---|---|
| 1 | Jesse Mermuys | 2015–2016 | 50 | 23 | 27 | .460 | — | — | — | — | |
| 2 | Jerry Stackhouse | 2016–2018 | 100 | 70 | 30 | .700 | 12 | 9 | 3 | .750 | NBA D-League Coach of the Year (2017); NBA D-League champion (2017) |
| 3 | Jama Mahlalela | 2018–2020 | 93 | 51 | 42 | .548 | 2 | 1 | 1 | .500 | |
| 4 | Patrick Mutombo | 2020–2022 | 47 | 36 | 11 | .766 | 4 | 2 | 2 | .500 | |
| 5 | Eric Khoury | 2022–2024 | 66 | 30 | 36 | .455 | – | – | – | – | |
| 6 | Drew Jones | 2024–2026 | 67 | 36 | 34 | .514 | 1 | 0 | 1 | .000 | G-League Coach of the Month (December 2025) |
| 7 | Noah Lewis | 2026–present | | | | – | | | | – | |

== Awards ==
=== Most Valuable Player ===
- Lorenzo Brown (2018)
- Chris Boucher (2019)

=== Finals MVP ===
- Pascal Siakam (2017)

=== Defensive Player of the Year ===
- Edy Tavares (2017)
- Chris Boucher (2019)
- Gary Payton II (2021)

=== Coach of the Year ===
- Jerry Stackhouse (2017)

=== All Stars ===
- Ronald Roberts (2016)
- Scott Suggs (2016)
- Axel Toupane (2016, 2017)
- Edy Tavares (2017)

=== All League teams ===
- Edy Tavares (2017 First team)
- Axel Toupane (2017 Third team)
- Lorenzo Brown (2018 First team)
- Chris Boucher (2019 First Team)
- Jordan Loyd (2019 First team)
- Henry Ellenson (2021 Second Team)
- Malachi Flynn (2021 Second team)
- Alize Johnson (2021 Second team)

=== All Defensive League teams ===
- Edy Tavares (2017)
- Chris Boucher (2019)
- Gary Payton II (2021)

=== All Rookie teams ===
- Malachi Flynn (2021)

=== Slam Dunk Champion ===
- John Jordan (2016)

=== Jason Collier Sportsmanship Award ===
- Scott Suggs (2016)

=== Most Improved Player ===
- Axel Toupane (2016)

=== Executive of the Year ===
- Chad Sanders (2021)

=== Franchise of the Year ===
- (2019–20)

== NBA affiliates ==
- Toronto Raptors (2015–present)
