= Scott Suggs =

American basketball player (born 1989)

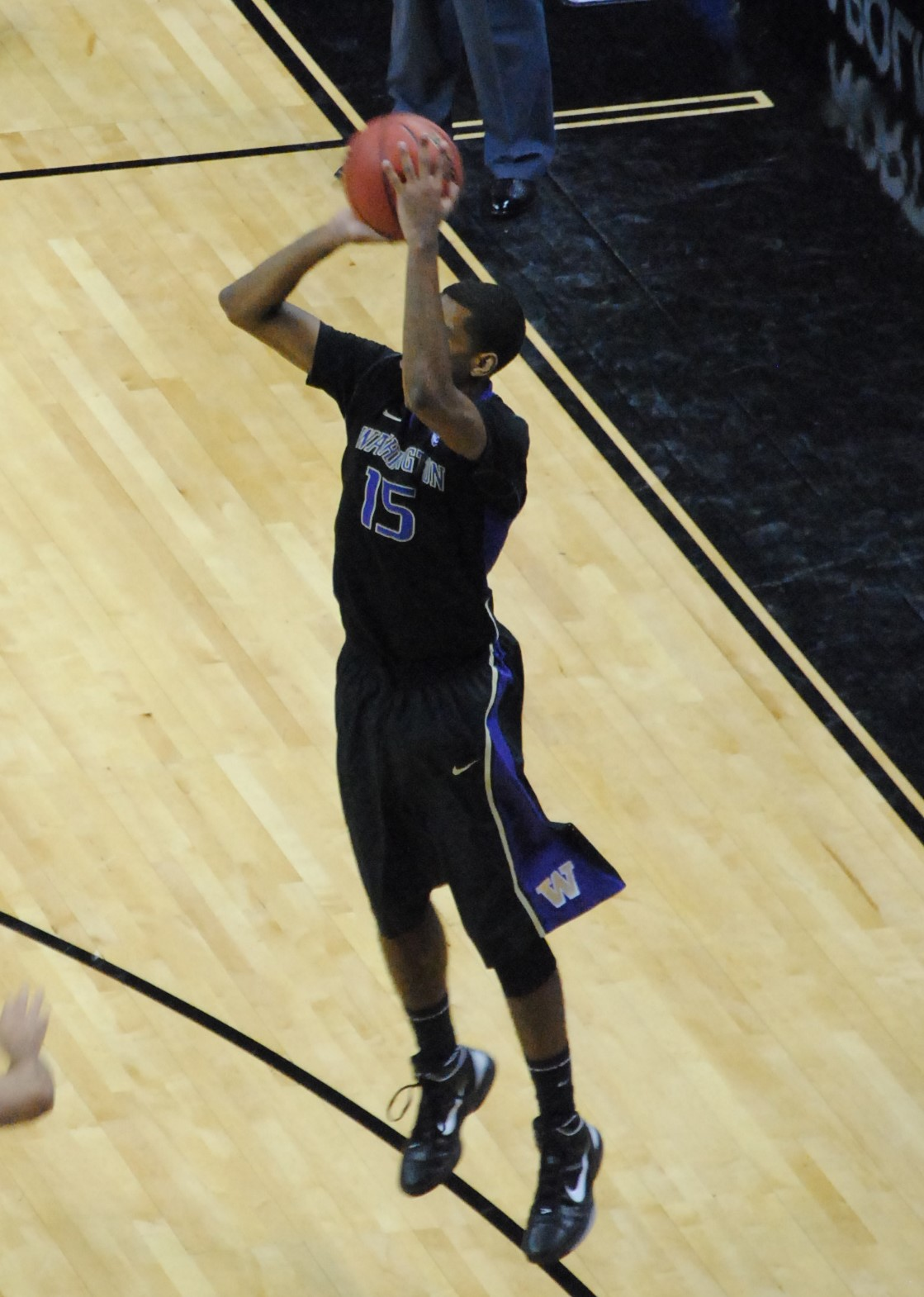
- Suggs in action with Washington

Lions de Genève
- Position: Shooting guard / small forward
- League: Swiss Basketball League

Personal information
- Born: November 10, 1989 (age 37) Washington, Missouri, U.S.
- Listed height: 6 ft 6 in (1.98 m)
- Listed weight: 195 lb (88 kg)

Career information
- High school: Washington HS (Washington, Missouri)
- College: Washington (2008–2013)
- NBA draft: 2013: undrafted
- Playing career: 2013–present

Career history
- 2013–2014: Erie BayHawks
- 2014–2015: Élan Chalon
- 2015–2016: Raptors 905
- 2016–2017: ICL Manresa
- 2017–2018: New Basket Brindisi
- 2018–2019: Kymi
- 2019–2020: Maccabi Haifa
- 2020–2021: Iraklis Thessaloniki
- 2021–present: Lions de Genève

Career highlights
- NBA D-League All-Star (2016); NBA D-League Sportsmanship Award (2016); Mr. Show-Me Basketball (2008)
- Stats at Basketball Reference

Scott Suggs (born November 10, 1989) is an American professional basketball player who plays for Lions de Genève of the Swiss Basketball League. He played college basketball for the University of Washington before playing professionally in the NBA G League, France, Spain, Italy, Greece and Israel.

== High school career ==
Suggs attended local Washington High School where he averaged 22.5 points as well as a Gateway Athletic Conference-leading 9 rebounds and 2.8 blocked shots per game as a senior, leading Washington to a 20–5 record and a trip the Class 5 sectional round. For this, he was named Mr. Show-Me Basketball award as the state's top player. When he graduated he was ranked as the 11th best shooting guard and a top-100 overall prospect by Scout.com and Rivals.com.

== College career ==
Suggs played college basketball for Washington, where he led the Huskies and was third in the Pac-10 Conference in three-point field goal percentage (45 percent) as a junior. As a senior, Suggs averaged 12.1 points and 2.3 rebounds per game for the Huskies. He ended his career in seventh place all-time in school history in three-point shooting percentage (.401), sixth in free-throw percentage (.821) and sixth all-time with 144 three-pointers made.

== Professional career ==
After going undrafted in the 2013 NBA draft, Suggs joined the Milwaukee Bucks for the 2013 NBA Summer League. On November 1, 2013, Suggs was selected by the Santa Cruz Warriors with the fifteenth overall pick in the 2013 NBA Development League Draft. Three days later, he was acquired by the Erie BayHawks as part of a multi-team trade. On November 22, he made his professional debut in a 102–91 loss to the Canton Charge, recording nine points, one rebound, two assists and one steal in 14 minutes. He averaged 18.5 points, 3.8 rebounds and 2.1 assists per game as a rookie.

In July 2014, Suggs played with the Miami Heat and the Orlando Magic in the 2014 NBA Summer League. On July 23, 2014, he signed with Élan Chalon of the French League for the 2014–2015 season, averaging 10.1 points, 2.6 rebounds, 1.3 assists and 0.7 steals in 35 games.

After his stint in France, Suggs joined the Washington Wizards for the 2015 NBA Summer League. On October 31, 2015, he was acquired by the Raptors 905. On November 14, he made his debut with the Raptors in an 83–80 loss to the Fort Wayne Mad Ants, recording 20 points, five rebounds and one steal in 39 minutes. On February 11, 2016, he was named in the East All-Star team for the 2016 NBA D-League All-Star Game as a replacement for Keith Appling, after averaging 16.3 points, 3.1 rebounds, 1.7 assists and 34.6 minutes in 32 games. On April 21, he was named the recipient of the 2016 NBA Development League's Jason Collier Sportsmanship Award.

On August 5, 2016, Suggs signed with ICL Manresa of Spain's Liga ACB.

On August 15, 2019, Suggs signed with Maccabi Haifa of the Israeli Premier League. He averaged 13.7 points, 2.8 rebounds, and 2.1 assists per game. On July 30, 2020, Suggs returned to Greece and signed with Iraklis Thessaloniki.

== Filmography ==
2016 Popstar: Never Stop Never Stopping as Scott Bertram
