= Dan Craig =

American basketball coach

Chicago Bulls
- Position: Associate head coach
- League: NBA

Personal information
- Born: June 9, 1980 (age 46)

Career information
- High school: Chelmsford (North Chelmsford, Massachusetts)
- College: Plymouth State (1999–2003)
- Coaching career: 2012–present

Career history

Coaching
- 2012–2015: Miami Heat (assistant)
- 2015–2016: Sioux Falls Skyforce
- 2016–2020: Miami Heat (assistant)
- 2020–2024: Los Angeles Clippers (associate HC)
- 2024—present: Chicago Bulls (associate HC)

Career highlights
- 3× NBA champion (2006, 2012, 2013); NBA D-League champion (2016); NBA D-League Coach of the Year (2016); NBA D-League All-Star Game head coach (2016)

Dan Craig (born June 9, 1980) is an American professional basketball coach who serves as a lead assistant coach for the Chicago Bulls of the National Basketball Association (NBA). He served in various coaching staff roles for the Miami Heat between 2003 and 2015 before joining the Sioux Falls Skyforce as their head coach for the 2015–16 season and guiding them to their maiden D-League championship. Craig returned to coach the Heat for the 2016–17 season.

== Coaching career ==
After spending four years playing college basketball for Plymouth State University between 1999 and 2003, Craig had a brief stint as a graduate assistant at Bloomsburg University before joining the Miami Heat as an intern in the video department for the 2003–04 season. He was named the Heat's assistant video coordinator in 2004 and two years later was promoted to video coordinator, a role he served for five seasons before being elevated to video coordinator/player development coach prior to the 2011–12 season. Then between 2012 and 2015, he served in various coaching staff roles such as assistant coach/video coordinator, assistant coach/player development, and assistant coach/director of player development.

On September 25, 2015, Craig was appointed head coach of the Heat's NBA Development League affiliate team, the Sioux Falls Skyforce. On January 29, 2016, he was named the East All-Star team head coach for the 2016 NBA D-League All-Star Game. In 2015–16, Craig led the Skyforce to a 40–10 regular-season record, the best mark in league history. Sioux Falls had 10-game (December 18 – January 12) and nine-game (March 4–25) winning streaks during the season, and won 11 of its last 13 games to secure the NBA D-League Central Division title. The team also went a league-best 22–3 at home. He subsequently earned D-League Coach of the Month honors for December, January and March/April, and won the 2015–16 Dennis Johnson Coach of the Year Award. The Skyforce went on to win the league championship with a 2–1 Finals series win over the Los Angeles D-Fenders.

On May 13, 2016, it was announced that Craig would be re-joining the Miami Heat as an assistant coach for the 2016–17 season.

On November 16, 2020, Craig was hired as an assistant coach for the Los Angeles Clippers under head coach Tyronn Lue.

On July 13, 2024, Craig was hired by Chicago Bulls head coach Billy Donovan as one of his lead assistant coaches, alongside Wes Unseld Jr.
