= Andre Ingram =

American basketball player (born 1985)

Personal information
- Born: November 19, 1985 (age 41) Richmond, Virginia, U.S.
- Listed height: 6 ft 3 in (1.91 m)
- Listed weight: 184 lb (83 kg)

Career information
- High school: Highland Springs (Highland Springs, Virginia)
- College: American (2003–2007)
- NBA draft: 2007: undrafted
- Playing career: 2007–2022
- Position: Shooting Guard
- Number: 20

Career history
- 2007–2011: Utah Flash
- 2012, 2013–2020: Los Angeles D-Fenders / South Bay Lakers
- 2016: Perth Wildcats
- 2018–2019: Los Angeles Lakers
- 2021–2022: South Bay Lakers

Career highlights
- 2× NBA D-League Three-Point Contest champion (2010, 2016); 2× NBA G League Sportsmanship Award (2010, 2022); 2× First-team All-Patriot League (2005, 2007); Second-team All-Patriot League (2006); Patriot League Rookie of the Year (2004); Patriot League All-Rookie Team (2004)
- Stats at NBA.com
- Stats at Basketball Reference

Andre Ingram (born November 19, 1985) is an American former professional basketball player who played two seasons for the Los Angeles Lakers. He played college basketball for American University, where he finished his four-year career as the school's fifth all-time leading scorer with 1,655 points. He made his NBA debut with the Los Angeles Lakers in 2018. Ingram is the NBA G League's career leader in three-point field goals and games played. He has also scored the third-most points in league history and won the D-League 3-Point Contest in 2010 and 2016.

As a pro, Ingram spent four seasons with the Utah Flash between 2007 and 2011, and four seasons with the Los Angeles D-Fenders between 2012 and 2016. After a short stint in Australia with the Perth Wildcats, Ingram returned to the D-Fenders in March 2017. He continued on with the renamed South Bay Lakers for the 2017–18 season, before joining the Los Angeles Lakers in April 2018, and finally making his NBA debut.

== Early life ==
Ingram was born and raised in Richmond, Virginia, and grew up in a tight-knit family of four. He loved basketball from an early age, and by the time he turned 12, he was beating his older brother by seven years, Lucius, in one-on-one.

Ingram attended Highland Springs High School in Highland Springs, Virginia, where he led the basketball team to the Group AAA championship as a senior in 2002–03, the first title in school history. That year, he averaged 22.8 points and 9.5 rebounds per game, while shooting 49 percent from three-point range. He was subsequently named the Associated Press Group AAA Player of the Year for his division. He left Highland Springs as a two-time Capital District Player of the Year and First-Team All-Metro, and as a senior was a First-Team All-State and First-Team All-Central Region pick.

== College career ==
=== Freshman year ===
As a freshman at American University in 2003–04, Ingram started in all 31 games and led the team with 13.6 points per game, which ranked fifth best in the league. He was subsequently named Patriot League Freshman of the Year, becoming the first American player to win the award. He had 16 points, five rebounds, two assists and two steals against Maryland on November 22, 2003, in his first collegiate game. On January 14, 2004, he made eight shots from behind the arc in a 27-point effort against Navy, which ties the second best single-game three-point total in AU history. In addition, his 15 three-point attempts against Navy is tied for the highest single-game attempt total for an Eagle. He went on to score a career-high 30 points on 10-of-19 shooting against Lafayette on February 28.

=== Sophomore year ===
As a sophomore in 2004–05, Ingram played in 28 games with 27 starts and was named first-team All-Patriot League. He finished the season as the PL's second-leading scoring, just half a point out of the lead, with 15.3 points per game. After being named the PL Preseason Player of the Year, Ingram opened the season with 38 points against VCU. He registered six 20+ point performances in 28 games, including two 30+ point performances. He was named Patriot League Player of the Week twice during February 2005, and at the season's end, he was named National Association of Basketball Coaches All-District 4 Second Team.

=== Junior year ===
As a junior in 2005–06, Ingram played and started in all 29 games. He led team in scoring for the third consecutive season, averaging 12.0 points per game. He scored in double digits in 19 of 29 games, starting the season with a 24-point effort against Washington on November 19. He notched his 1,000th career point, while amassing a season-high 10 rebounds, against the Saint Francis Red Flash on January 2. At the season's end, he earned second-team All-Patriot League honors.

=== Senior year ===
As a senior in 2006–07, Ingram ranked fifth in the Patriot League in scoring (15.2 ppg), second in three-point field goal percentage (.424) and second in three-point field goals made per game (2.6). He scored 20 or more points eight times, including a season-high 25 points against Lafayette. He subsequently earned first-team All-Patriot League honors for the second time in three years.

Ingram finished his collegiate career as American's fifth all-time leading scorer with 1,655 points, as he led the team in scoring all four years. He graduated from American University with a bachelor’s degree in physics.

== Professional career ==
=== Utah Flash (2007–2011) ===
On November 1, 2007, Ingram was selected by the Utah Flash in the seventh round of the 2007 NBA Development League Draft. He spent four years with the Flash, and in that time, became the franchise's all-time leading scorer with 2,098 points. He also ranks second in rebounds (608), fourth in assists (336), and third in steals (184).

Ingram had a career-best year in 2009–10, as he won the Jason Collier Sportsmanship Award and participated in 2010 NBA D-League All-Star festivities in Dallas, where he took home the Three-Point Shooting Competition Championship. Ingram made noteworthy contributions in game as well, starting 49 of the team's 50 games, and averaging 12.9 points, 3.9 rebounds, 2.1 assists and 1.5 steals in 34.0 minutes. He scored in double figures 36 times, including a season-high 24 points in a 104–99 road victory over the Bakersfield Jam on December 5, 2009.

Following the 2010–11 season, the Flash suspended operations and left Ingram without a team for the 2011–12 season.

=== Los Angeles D-Fenders (2012–2016) ===
On March 22, 2012, Ingram was acquired by the Los Angeles D-Fenders. He spent the rest of the 2011–12 season with the D-Fenders, playing in six regular season games and seven playoff games.

After sitting out the entire 2012–13 season, Ingram returned to the D-Fenders for the 2013–14 season. In 45 games (11 starts) with the D-Fenders in 2013–14, Ingram posted averages of 9.1 points, 3.2 rebounds and 1.7 assists, while shooting .447 from three-point range and helping the D-Fenders to a West Division Championship.

Ingram did not return to the D-Fenders for the start of 2014–15 season. He missed the first two months of the season before joining the team on January 12, 2015.

Ingram spent only his second full season with the D-Fenders in 2015–16. In February 2016, he became the D-League's all-time leader in three-pointers made and won his second three-point contest title. He took the crown by making 39-of-50 shots over two rounds – an all-time record across the NBA and D-League.

=== Perth Wildcats (2016) ===
On October 18, 2016, Ingram signed with the Perth Wildcats for the rest of the 2016–17 NBL season, marking his first stint overseas. However, he managed just two games for the Wildcats before requesting his release from the club a week after landing in Perth, citing mental health reasons for the sudden decision.

=== Return to D-Fenders / South Bay Lakers (2017–2018) ===
On March 6, 2017, Ingram returned to the Los Angeles D-Fenders to play out the 2016–17 season. He returned to the team, now called the South Bay Lakers, for the 2017–18 season. Ingram averaged 9.1 points, 2.5 rebounds and 1.1 assists in 47 games (seven starts) for the South Bay Lakers in 2017–18, shooting a league-best 47.5 percent from three-point range.

=== Los Angeles Lakers (2018) ===
On April 9, 2018, Ingram signed with the Los Angeles Lakers for the final two games of the 2017–18 NBA season. He made his NBA debut the following day, scoring 19 points with four 3-pointers in a 105–99 loss to the Houston Rockets. At 32 years old, Ingram became the second oldest American rookie in the NBA since at least Pablo Prigioni’s 2012 rookie season at 35 years of age. His 19 points were the most by a Laker in his first career game since Nick Van Exel had 23 in 1993. For players making their NBA debut after the All-Star break, Ingram's 19 points were the most in a debut in 50 years, and the most scored by a Laker since Danny Finn's 28 points in 1953. In the Lakers' season finale on April 11, Ingram scored five points on 2-of-9 shooting, including 1 of 4 from 3-point range, and had six assists and three rebounds in 35 minutes in a 115–100 win over the Los Angeles Clippers. Ingram reportedly earned $13,824 for his three days with the Lakers, after making just $19,000 for the entirety of his G League season.

=== Third stint with South Bay (2018–2019) ===
Returning to the South Bay Lakers for the 2018–19 season, Ingram appeared in his 402nd career game in the NBA G League in January 2019, becoming the league's all-time leader for games played.

=== Return to Los Angeles (2019) ===
On March 11, 2019, Ingram signed a 10-day contract with the Los Angeles Lakers, returning to the franchise for a second stint. With Lonzo Ball and Brandon Ingram out for the remainder of the season due to injuries, the Lakers roster required bolstering.

=== Fourth stint with South Bay (2019–2022) ===
After his 10-day contract expired, Ingram returned to South Bay for their final two games of the season.

Ingram once again returned to South Bay for the 2019–20 season. On February 7, 2020, he was removed from the active roster due to a season-ending injury. He suffered a right pectoralis tendon tear on January 22 and never fully recovered.

In October 2020, Ingram was named as the inaugural president of the G League Players Union, known as the Basketball Players Union (BPU).

On October 23, 2021, Ingram was named to the training camp roster for the South Bay Lakers, returning to the franchise for a fifth stint.

On December 19, 2021, Ingram was re-elected as President of the NBA G-League's union, following his stint as interim inaugural president. On April 10, 2022, he received his second Jason Collier Sportsmanship Award.

=== Fifth stint with South Bay (2023) ===
On March 8, 2023, Ingram was reacquired by the South Bay Lakers. Ingram is considered to be retired but, he has expressed interest in returning to professional basketball.

== Career statistics ==
Legend
GP	Games played	GS	Games started	MPG	Minutes per game
FG%	Field goal percentage	3P%	3-point field goal percentage	FT%	Free throw percentage
RPG	Rebounds per game	APG	Assists per game	SPG	Steals per game
BPG	Blocks per game	PPG	Points per game	**Bold**	Career high
*	Led the league

=== NBA ===
Year	Team	GP	GS	MPG	FG%	3P%	FT%	RPG	APG	SPG	BPG	PPG
2017–18	L.A. Lakers	2	0	**32.0**	**.471**	**.556**	**1.000**	**3.0**	**3.5**	**1.5**	**1.5**	**12.0**
2018–19	L.A. Lakers	**4**	0	3.8	.000	.000	–	.5	.0	.3	.0	.0
Career		6	0	13.2	.348	.417	1.000	1.3	1.2	.7	.5	4.0

=== NBA G League ===
==== Regular season ====
Year	Team	GP	GS	MPG	FG%	3P%	FT%	RPG	APG	SPG	BPG	PPG
2007–08	Utah	**50***	2	15.1	.494	.448	.793	1.7	1.1	.5	.0	6.1
2008–09	Utah	49	20	27.6	.452	.470	.870	3.5	1.6	.9	.1	10.4
2009–10	Utah	49	**49**	**34.0**	.456	.403	.850	**3.9**	2.1	**1.5**	.1	12.9
2010–11	Utah	**50***	29	29.2	.452	.455	**.873**	3.3	2.0	.9	.0	**13.0**
2011–12	Los Angeles	6	0	28.2	.451	.545*	.818	3.5	**2.5**	.5	.0	12.2
2013–14	Los Angeles	45	11	23.0	.453	.447	.787	3.2	1.7	1.1	.1	9.1
2014–15	Los Angeles	28	10	25.6	.448	.444	.868	**3.9**	1.1	1.4	.2	9.2
2015–16	Los Angeles	**50***	17	26.4	.490	.496	.860	2.8	1.4	1.1	.2	10.4
2016–17	Los Angeles	10	4	29.3	**.529**	**.551**	.789	3.6	1.5	1.1	**.4**	11.6
2017–18	South Bay	47	7	22.8	.465	.475*	.824	2.5	1.1	.6	.2	9.1
2018–19	South Bay	37	15	24.4	.397	.360	.833	2.8	1.1	.7	.1	8.8
2021–22	South Bay	34	2	12.9	.396	.395	.667	1.1	.5	.3	.0	3.5
Career		483	173	24.5	.457	.450	.842	2.9	1.4	.9	.1	9.5

==== Playoffs ====
Year	Team	GP	GS	MPG	FG%	3P%	FT%	RPG	APG	SPG	BPG	PPG
2009	Utah	4	0	20.1	.409	.385	.500	1.8	.2	.0	.0	6.2
2010	Utah	3	3	31.1	.281	.333	**1.000**	3.7	**2.7**	**2.3**	**.3**	8.7
2011	Utah	3	3	28.9	.410	.409	.778	3.7	1.7	.0	.0	**16.0**
2012	Los Angeles	7	0	17.4	.294	.320	.750	1.1	.9	.1	.0	5.3
2014	Los Angeles	2	0	27.3	.467	**.500**	**1.000**	3.0	1.5	.5	.0	10.0
2016	Los Angeles	**9**	**9**	**37.9**	.432	.350	.692	**4.2**	1.2	1.1	**.3**	9.7
2017	Los Angeles	3	0	16.2	**.500**	**.500**	.500	2.0	1.3	.3	.0	7.0
2018	South Bay	3	0	32.9	.464	.444	.750	1.3	.7	.0	.0	12.3
Career		34	15	27.2	.399	.387	.729	2.7	1.2	.6	.1	8.9

=== College ===
Year	Team	GP	GS	MPG	FG%	3P%	FT%	RPG	APG	SPG	BPG	PPG
2003–04	American	**31**	**31**	31.0	.393	.396	.786	4.0	1.1	.7	.1	13.6
2004–05	American	28	27	**34.9**	.410	.368	.744	4.3	**2.1**	1.1	**.2**	**15.3**
2005–06	American	29	29	32.4	.345	.338	.784	4.7	1.8	1.0	.1	12.0
2006–07	American	30	30	34.5	**.420**	**.424**	**.832**	**4.8**	1.8	**1.2**	.1	15.2
Career		118	117	33.3	.393	.385	.787	4.5	1.7	1.0	.1	14.0

== Filmography ==
Year	Title	Role	Notes
2021	Wheel of Fortune	Himself	Episode: "Disney Secret Santa"

== Personal life ==
Ingram has a wife and two daughters. Prior to his promotion to the NBA, he tutored children in math to supplement his G-League salary.

Ingram is a Christian. In a 2016 interview, he described the relationship between his sports career and his faith: “I pray more than I stretch, more than I shoot jump shots and all those things. My prayer time is a lot higher than how many shots I get up and what have you. That’s No. 1 for me in all that I do is my faith. I’m praying before games, I’m even praying during games to myself, and just kind of making sure I’m in line with God, because that’s what carries me through everything.”

In December 2021, Ingram appeared on a "Secret Santa" episode of Wheel of Fortune. He won $31,750, and a random fan chosen through the “Secret Santa” lottery also won this amount.

== See also ==
- List of NBA G League career scoring leaders
