= Austin Spurs =

American professional basketball team of the NBA G League

- Conference: Western
- League: NBA G League
- Founded: 2001
- History: Columbus Riverdragons; 2001–2005; Austin Toros; 2005–2014; Austin Spurs; 2014–present
- Arena: H-E-B Center at Cedar Park
- Location: Cedar Park, Texas
- Team colors: Black, silver, white
- General manager: Josh Larson
- Head coach: Chris Kent
- Ownership: Spurs Sports & Entertainment
- Affiliation: San Antonio Spurs
- Championships: 2 (2012, 2018)
- Conference titles: 4 (2005, 2008, 2012, 2018)
- Division titles: 5 (2005, 2008, 2015, 2016, 2018)
- Website: austin.gleague.nba.com

The Austin Spurs are an American professional basketball team in the NBA G League based in the Greater Austin area. They are affiliated with the San Antonio Spurs, and play their home games at H-E-B Center at Cedar Park. The team has made the postseason in 8 out of 14 seasons in the NBA Development League.

On October 15, 2014, after the San Antonio Spurs purchased the franchise, the team colors and logo were changed to reflect the silver and black motif used by the Spurs.

The Spurs' general manager is Josh Larson.

== Franchise history ==
The Austin Spurs were established in Columbus, Georgia, as the Columbus Riverdragons. The franchise in 2005 was sold to Southwest Basketball, LLC, and were relocated to the city of Austin, Texas. Following the relocation, the franchise changed their name and logo becoming the Austin Toros, which was unveiled on August 10, 2005. The Toros name was the only NBA-associated team and first D-League team to possess a nickname of Spanish origin. The Toros began play during the 2005–06 season.

On June 28, 2007, the Toros were acquired by the San Antonio Spurs, becoming the second D-League team to be owned by an NBA team, after the Los Angeles D-Fenders were purchased by the Los Angeles Lakers in 2006.

On August 9, 2010, the Toros announced they would move to the Cedar Park Center from the Austin Convention Center and for the 2010–11 season.

On April 28, 2012, the Toros defeated the Los Angeles D-Fenders in Game 3 of the NBA D-League Finals to capture their first championship in franchise history.

On October 15, 2014, the team announced that they would be changing their name to the Austin Spurs, in reference to their parent team.

On April 10, 2018, the Spurs defeated Raptors 905 to secure their second G League championship.

In 2019, the Spurs played in the 2019 FIBA Intercontinental Cup in Rio de Janeiro, as the first G League team to play in the tournament. Austin lost in the semi-final to Flamengo.

In 2020, the Spurs named Tyler Self, son of Hall of Fame coach Bill Self, as the Austin Spurs' general manager and Matt Nielsen as the head coach. Due to the COVID-19 pandemic, the team played an abbreviated 2020–21 bubble season in Orlando.

Prior to the 2021–22 season, Petar Božić was named Austin's head coach after Nielsen was moved over to San Antonio as an assistant coach.

Prior to the 2022–23 season, Brent Barry was named Austin Spurs' general manager.

Prior to the 2024–25 season, Josh Larson was named Austin Spurs' general manager.

On September 10, 2026, Chris Kent was named as head coach.

== Home arenas ==
- Columbus Civic Center (2001–2005)
- Austin Convention Center (2005–2010)
- H-E-B Center at Cedar Park (2010–present)

== Season-by-season ==
Season	Division	Finish	Wins	Losses	Pct.	Postseason results
Columbus Riverdragons
2001–02		3rd	31	25	.554	Lost Semifinals (Greenville) 1–2
2002–03		6th	23	27	.460	
2003–04		6th	18	28	.391	
2004–05		1st	30	18	.625	Won Semifinals (Roanoke) 96–89; Lost NBDL Finals (Asheville) 67–90
Austin Toros
2005–06		6th	24	24	.500	
2006–07	Eastern	5th	21	29	.420	
Austin Toros
2007–08	Southwestern	1st	30	20	.600	Won Semifinals (Sioux Falls) 99–93; Lost D-League Finals (Idaho) 1–2
2008–09	Southwestern	2nd	32	18	.640	Won First Round (Idaho) 119–116 (OT); Lost Semifinals (Colorado) 111–114
2009–10	Western	2nd	32	18	.640	Won First Round (Dakota) 2–1; Lost Semifinals (Rio Grande Valley) 1–2
2010–11	Western	8th	22	28	.440	
2011–12	Western	2nd	33	17	.660	Won First Round (Erie) 2–1; Won Semifinals (Canton) 2–1; Won League Finals (Los Angeles) 2–1
2012–13	Central	2nd	27	23	.700	Won First Round (Bakersfield) 2–0; Lost Semifinals (Santa Cruz) 0–2
2013–14	Central	6th	19	31	.380	
Austin Spurs
2014–15	Southwest	1st	32	18	.640	Won Conf. Semifinal (Bakersfield) 2–1; Lost Conf. Final (Santa Cruz) 1–2
2015–16	Southwest	1st	30	20	.600	Won Conf. Semifinal (Rio Grande Valley) 2–1; Lost Conf. Final (Los Angeles) 1–2
2016–17	Southwest	4th	25	25	.500	
2017–18	Southwest	1st	32	18	.640	Won Conf. Semifinal (Rio Grande Valley) 117–91; Won Conf. Final (South Bay) 104–93; Won League Finals (Raptors) 2–0
2018–19	Southwest	3rd	20	30	.400	
2019–20	Southwest	2nd	24	18	.571	Season cancelled by COVID-19 pandemic
2020–21	—	5th	10	5	.667	Lost Quarterfinal (Delaware) 103–124
2021–22	Western	11th	13	19	.406	
2022–23	Western	14th	8	24	.250	
2023–24	Western	7th	20	14	.588	
2024–25	Western	2nd	22	12	.647	Won Conf. Semifinals (Salt Lake City) 123–113; Lost Conf. Final (Stockton) 112–118
Regular season			578	509	.532	
Playoffs			28	22	.560	

== Current roster ==
Austin Spurs roster
Players

Pos.	No.	Player	Height	Weight	DOB	From
F	–	Maliq Brown (TW)	6 ft 9 in (2.06 m)	225 lb (102 kg)	2003-11-16	Duke
G	–	Ja'Kobi Gillespie (TW)	6 ft 1 in (1.85 m)	186 lb (84 kg)	2004-03-10	Tennessee
G	25	David Jones García (TW)	6 ft 4 in (1.93 m)	210 lb (95 kg)	2001-11-24	Memphis
G	7	Isaiah Miller	6 ft 0 in (1.83 m)	180 lb (82 kg)	1997-11-09	UNC Greensboro
F	–	Terry Taylor	6 ft 4 in (1.93 m)	230 lb (104 kg)	1999-09-23	Austin Peay

Coaches
Head coach
- Vacant
Assistant(s)
- Jesse Childs
- K.J. Conklin
- Willis Hall
- Pierre Parker

Legend
- (DP) Unsigned draft pick
- (FA) Free agent
- (S) Suspended
- (P) Prospects
- (NBA) On assignment from NBA affiliate
- (TW) Two-way affiliate player
- Injured

Roster
Updated: March 1, 2026

== Head coaches ==
#	Head coach	Term	Regular season				Playoffs				Achievements
#	Head coach	Term	G	W	L	Win%	G	W	L	Win%	Achievements
1	Jeff Malone	2001–2005	200	102	98	.510	5	2	3	.400	
2	Dennis Johnson	2005–2007	98	45	53	.459	—	—	—	—	
3	Quin Snyder	2007–2010	150	94	56	.627	12	6	6	.500	
4	Brad Jones	2010–2012	100	55	45	.550	9	6	3	.667	D-League Champion (2011–12)
5	Taylor Jenkins	2012–2013	50	27	23	.540	4	2	2	.500	
6	Ken McDonald	2013–2017	200	106	94	.540	12	6	6	.500	
7	Blake Ahearn	2017–2020	100	52	48	.520	4	4	0	1.000	G League Champion (2017–18)
8	Matt Nielsen	2020–2021	15	10	5	.667	1	0	1	.000	
9	Petar Božić	2021–2023	64	21	43	.328	–	–	–	–	
10	Will Voigt	2023–2024	34	20	14	.588	–	–	–	–	
11	Scott King	2024–2025	34	22	12	.647	2	1	1	.500	
12	Jacob Chance	2025–2026				–				–	
13	Chris Kent	2026–present				–				–	

== NBA affiliates ==
=== Columbus Riverdragons ===
- None

=== Austin Toros ===
- Boston Celtics (2006–2007)
- Denver Nuggets (2005–2006)
- Houston Rockets (2005–2007)
- Los Angeles Clippers (2005–2006)
- San Antonio Spurs (2005–2014)

=== Austin Spurs ===
- San Antonio Spurs (2014–present)

== In international competitions ==
=== FIBA Intercontinental Cup ===
Champions Runners-up Third place Fourth place

Year	Round	W	L	W%
(Brazil) 2019	Fourth place	0	2	.000
Total		0	2	.000
