= List of NBA G League awards =

The NBA G League, formerly known as the National Basketball Development League (NBDL) and NBA Development League (D-League), presents 11 annual awards to recognize its teams, players, and coaches for their accomplishments. This does not include the G League championship trophy, which is given to the winning team of the G League Finals.

== Team trophies ==
=== Current ===
Award	First awarded	Description	Most recent winner
Championship Trophy	2002	The league's championship trophy; awarded to the winning team of the playoff finals.	Oklahoma City Blue (2024)

=== Former ===
Award	First awarded	Last awarded	Description
Development Champion	2012	2015	Awarded to the team that best embodies the league's goals of developing NBA basketball talent via call-ups and assignments.

== Honors ==
Honor	Created	Description
All-NBA G League Team	2002	Three 5-player teams (a first, second, and third team) composed of the best players in the league during the regular season.
All-Defensive Team	2011	5-player team composed of the best defensive players in the league during the regular season.
All-Rookie Team	2011	5-player team composed of the top rookies during the regular season.

== Individual awards ==
=== Current ===
Award	First awarded	Description	Most recent winner(s)
Most Valuable Player	2002	Awarded to the best performing player of the regular season.	Mac McClung, Osceola Magic (2023–24)
Finals MVP	2015	Awarded to the best performing player of the league finals.	Ousmane Dieng, Oklahoma City Blue (2023-24)
Defensive Player of the Year	2002	Awarded to the best defensive player of the regular season.	Shaquille Harrison, South Bay Lakers (2023–24)
Most Improved Player	2010	Awarded to the most improved player across the regular season.	Alondes Williams, Sioux Falls Skyforce (2023–24)
Rookie of the Year	2002	Awarded to the top rookie of the regular season.	Oscar Tshiebwe, Indiana Mad Ants (2023–24)
Coach of the Year (Dennis Johnson Trophy)	2007	Awarded to the best coach of the regular season.	Lindsey Harding, Stockton Kings (2023–24)
Sportsmanship Award	2002	Awarded to the player who best represents the ideals of character and conduct on and off the court.	Gabe Osabuohien, Cleveland Charge (2023–24)
Basketball Executive of the Year	2016	Awarded to the league's top front office executive involved with basketball operations.	Eric Amsler, Sioux Falls Skyforce (2023-24)
Team Executive of the Year	2010	Awarded to the league's top front office executive involved with team operations.	

=== Former ===
Award	First awarded	Last awarded	Description
All-Star Game MVP	2007	2017	Awarded to the best performing player of the All-Star Game.
Impact Player of the Year	2008	2017	Awarded to the player who joined the league mid-season and made the greatest contribution to his team's success following that acquisition.

== See also ==
- List of National Basketball Association awards
