= Sadiel Rojas =

Dominican-American basketball player (born 1989)

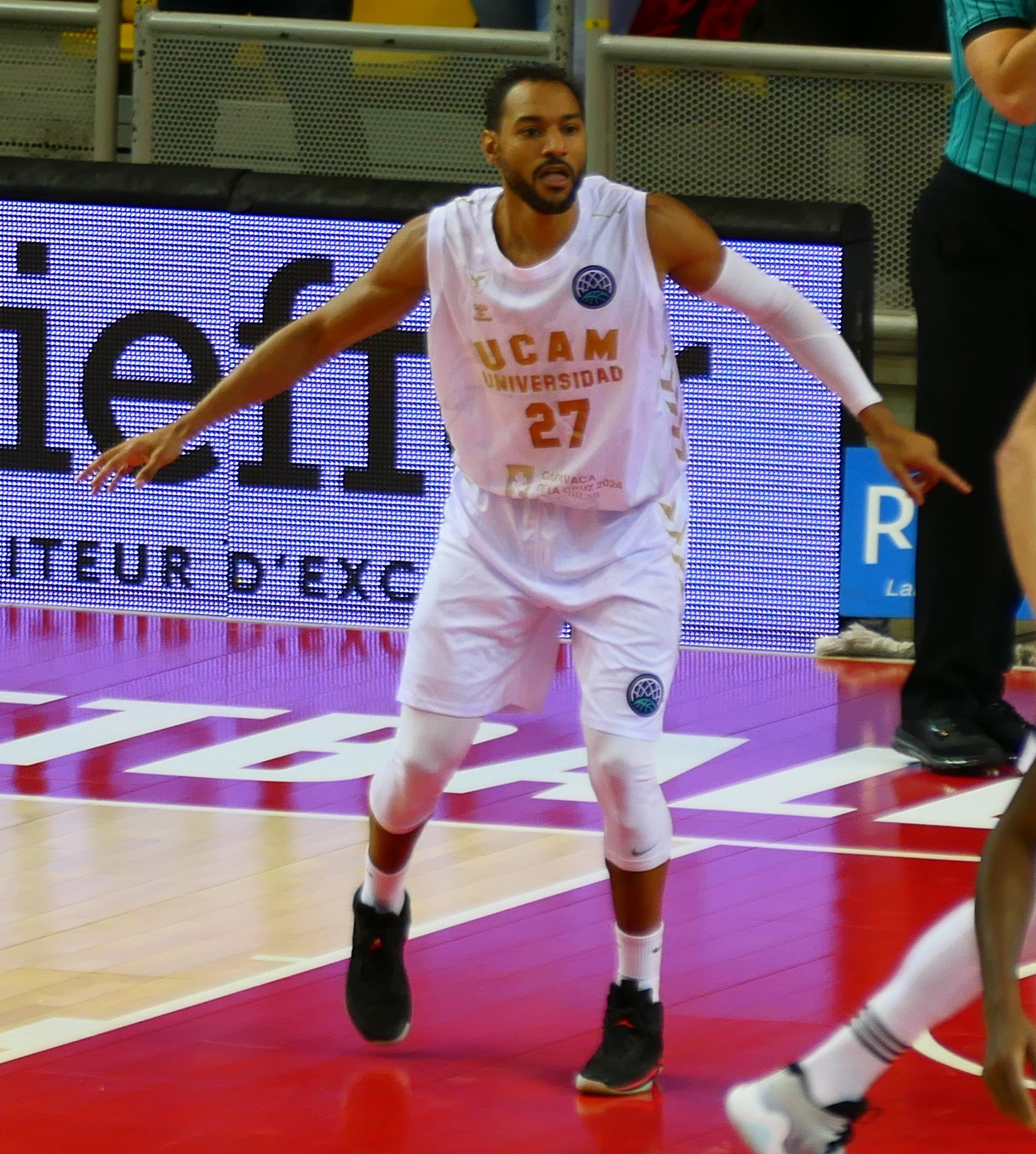
- Rojas in 2022

Personal information
- Born: July 16, 1989 (age 37) Sedgwick, Kansas
- Listed height: 6 ft 4 in (1.93 m)
- Listed weight: 190 lb (86 kg)

Career information
- High school: Grace Prep (Arlington, Texas)
- College: Oklahoma Wesleyan (2007–2011)
- NBA draft: 2011: undrafted
- Playing career: 2011–2023
- Position: Shooting guard / small forward
- Number: 27

Career history
- 2011: Leones de Santo Domingo
- 2011–2014: Fort Wayne Mad Ants
- 2013–2014: Leones de Santo Domingo
- 2014–2023: UCAM Murcia

Career highlights
- #27 retired by UCAM Murcia; LNB Best Defensive Player of the Year (2014); NBA D-League champion (2014); NBA D-League All-Defensive Second Team (2014); NBA D-League All-Defensive Third Team (2013); NABC NAIA Division II Player of the Year (2011); MCAC Player of the Year (2011); 3x NCCAA All-American (2009–2011); 3x NAIA All-American (2009–2011); NAIA Division II champion (2009); 4x First-team All-MCAC (2008–2011); NAIA Freshman of the Year (2008)

Sadiel Antonnio Lucciano Rojas Thompson (born July 16, 1989) is a Dominican-American professional basketball player who last played for UCAM Murcia in the Spanish league. Rojas played college basketball at Oklahoma Wesleyan University where he was the NAIA Division II Player of the Year as a senior in 2010–11.

== College career ==
Rojas played college basketball at Oklahoma Wesleyan University. Averaging a double-double on the season (17.8ppg, 10.3rpg), he helped the school capture the 2009 NAIA Division II National Championship. He and Steve Briggs, the leading scorer of the championships season, were inducted into the OKWU Sports Hall of Fame in October 2016. Rojas received NABC-NAIA Division II Player of the Year honors in his senior season after averaging 25.7 points and 11.9 rebounds a game.

== Professional career ==
=== Leones de Santo Domingo (2011) ===
In June 2011, Rojas signed with Leones de Santo Domingo of the Liga Nacional de Baloncesto (LNB).

=== Fort Wayne Mad Ants (2011–2014) ===
On November 3, 2011, he was selected by the Maine Red Claws in the fourth round of the 2011 NBA D-League draft. The next day, he was traded to the Fort Wayne Mad Ants. On February 28, 2012, he was waived by the Mad Ants due to injury.

On October 29, 2012, he was re-acquired by the Mad Ants. Following the conclusion of the 2012–13 D-League season, he re-joined Leones de Santo Domingo. On November 23, 2013, he was again re-acquired by the Mad Ants. Rojas won the 2014 NBA D-League championship with Fort Wayne.

=== Return to Leones de Santo Domingo (2013–2014) ===
Following the conclusion of the 2013–14 D-League season, he re-joined Leones de Santo Domingo where he won LNB Best Defensive Player of the Year honors.

=== UCAM Murcia (2014–2023) ===
In July 2014, he joined the Indiana Pacers for the 2014 NBA Summer League. Days later, he signed with Spanish squad UCAM Murcia and renewed his contract in 2015 and 2016. After averaging 4.6 points and 5.4 rebounds per game in 2019–20, Rojas extended his contract in June 2020. He last played for Murcia in the 2022–23 season. Rojas saw the hardwood in a total of 292 Liga ACB contests.

=== The Basketball Tournament ===
Rojas competed for the Ants Alumni in The Basketball Tournament. He was a guard on the 2015 team who made it to the semifinals, falling 76–87 to Team 23.

== NBA D-League career statistics ==
Legend
GP	Games played	GS	Games started	MPG	Minutes per game
FG%	Field goal percentage	3P%	3-point field goal percentage	FT%	Free throw percentage
RPG	Rebounds per game	APG	Assists per game	SPG	Steals per game
BPG	Blocks per game	PPG	Points per game	**Bold**	Career high
*	Led the league

†	Denotes seasons in which Rojas' team won the D-League championship

=== Regular season ===
Year	Team	GP	GS	MPG	FG%	3P%	FT%	RPG	APG	SPG	BPG	PPG
2011–12	Fort Wayne	30	7	17.7	**.456**	.143	.741	5.2	.2	1.0	.2	5.9
2012–13	Fort Wayne	**50**	2	23.3	.450	.337	.701	6.2	**1.1**	1.3	**.4**	8.1
2013–14†	Fort Wayne	**50**	**37**	**29.7**	**.456**	**.368**	**.758**	**8.6**	**1.1**	**1.7**	**.4**	**12.4**
Career	3 years, 1 team	130	46	24.4	.453	.350	.740	6.9	.9	1.4	.3	9.1

== Dominican national team ==
He was capped for the Dominican national team on many occasions. He participated in the 2016 Centrobasket Championship, winning the bronze medal, the 2017 FIBA AmeriCup and the 2019 Pan American Games.
