= Elliot Williams =

American basketball player (born 1989)

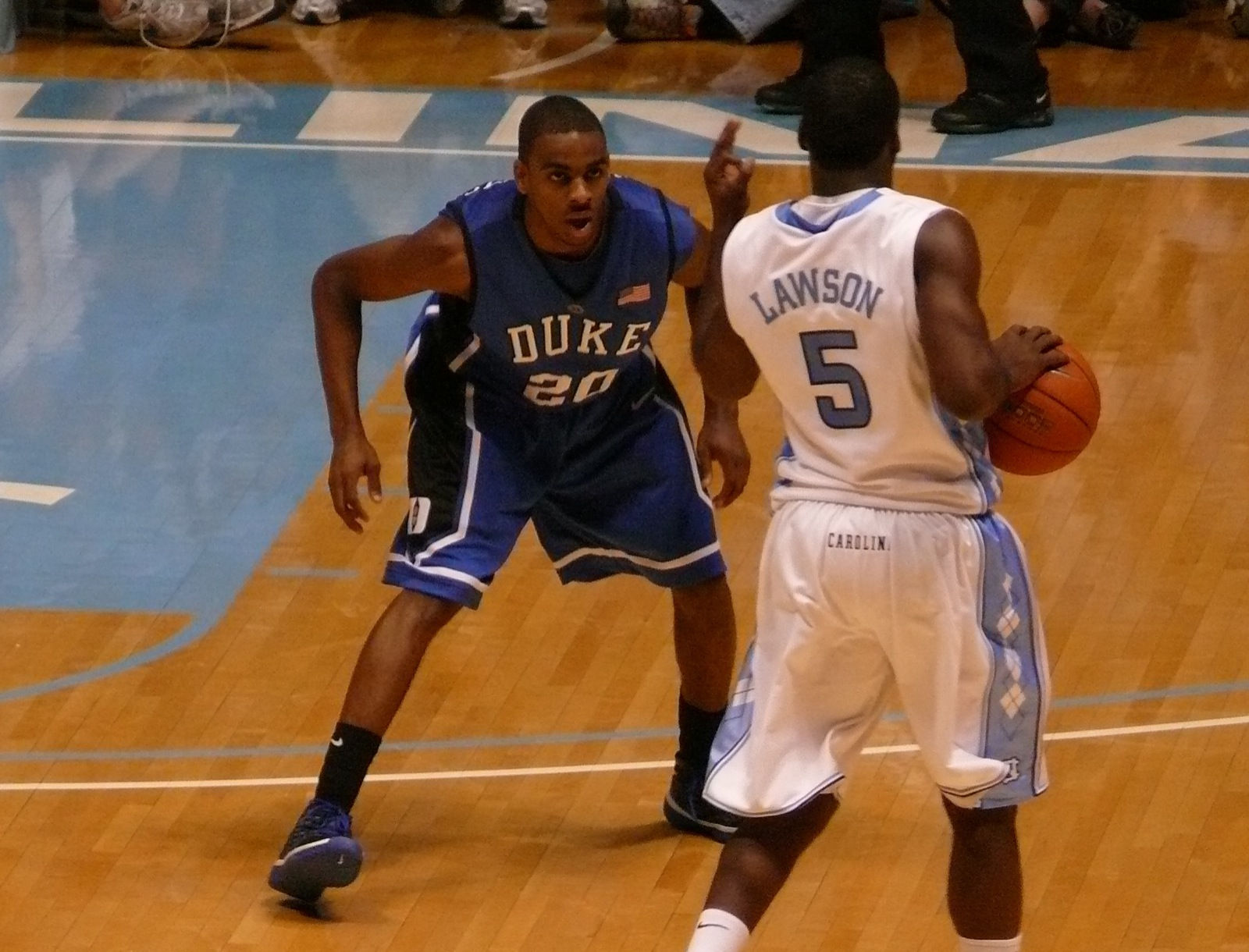
- Williams (left) playing for Duke in 2009

Personal information
- Born: June 20, 1989 (age 37) Memphis, Tennessee, U.S.
- Listed height: 6 ft 5 in (1.96 m)
- Listed weight: 190 lb (86 kg)

Career information
- High school: St. George's Independent School (Collierville, Tennessee)
- College: Duke (2008–2009); Memphis (2009–2010)
- NBA draft: 2010: 1st round, 22nd overall pick
- Drafted by: Portland Trail Blazers
- Playing career: 2010–2016
- Position: Shooting guard
- Number: 9, 25, 2, 22

Career history
- 2010–2013: Portland Trail Blazers
- 2013–2014: Philadelphia 76ers
- 2014: →Delaware 87ers
- 2014–2015: Santa Cruz Warriors
- 2015: Utah Jazz
- 2015: New Orleans Pelicans
- 2015–2016: Santa Cruz Warriors
- 2016: Memphis Grizzlies
- 2016: Panathinaikos

Career highlights
- NBA D-League champion (2015); NBA D-League Finals MVP (2015); All-NBA D-League Second Team (2015); 2× NBA D-League All-Star (2015, 2016); Second-team Parade All-American (2008); McDonald's All-American (2008); Division II A Tennessee Mr. Basketball (2008)
- Stats at NBA.com
- Stats at Basketball Reference

Elliot Jerell Williams (born June 20, 1989) is an American former professional basketball player. He played college basketball for the Duke Blue Devils and Memphis Tigers. He was selected with the 22nd overall pick in the 2010 NBA draft by the Portland Trail Blazers.

== Early life ==
Considered a five-star recruit by Rivals.com, Williams was listed as the No. 3 shooting guard and the No. 16 player overall in the nation in 2008.

== College career ==
=== Duke ===
For the Duke Blue Devils, Williams saw action in 34 of Duke's 37 games, starting in 12 contests, with 11 coming in the Blue Devils' final 12 games of the season (including ACC and NCAA tournaments), averaging 4.2 points and 2.3 rebounds per game. Williams also recorded 23 assists and 21 steals, and shot 44.1 percent from the field, 25 percent from the three-point arc, and 50 percent from the foul line, in helping lead Duke to a 30–7 overall record, an ACC Tournament crown, and an NCAA Tournament Sweet 16 appearance.

=== Memphis ===
Williams received an NCAA waiver in August 2009, which allowed him to play immediately for the Memphis Tigers, for the 2009–10 season, after he played with the Duke Blue Devils during the 2008–09 season. With Memphis, Williams played in a total of 68 career games, with 46 starts, and averaged 11.1 points, 2.3 rebounds, and 2.2 assists per game.

== Professional career ==
=== Portland Trail Blazers (2010–2013) ===
Williams was selected 22nd overall in the 2010 NBA draft by the Portland Trail Blazers. After playing in the preseason for the Trail Blazers, Williams missed the entire 2010–11 season due to a knee injury.

Williams also missed a significant portion of the 2011–12 NBA season after dislocating his shoulder during an early March practice. Williams had made 24 appearances over the course of the season, averaging 3.7 points per game.

Williams missed the entire 2012–13 season due to an Achilles tendon injury.

=== Philadelphia 76ers (2013–2014) ===
In September 2013, Williams signed with the Cleveland Cavaliers. He was later waived on October 25. On November 20, 2013, Williams signed with the Philadelphia 76ers. On January 5, 2014, he was assigned to the Delaware 87ers. He was recalled the next day. On October 27, 2014, he was waived by the 76ers.

=== Santa Cruz Warriors (2014–2015) ===
On November 1, 2014, Williams was selected by the Santa Cruz Warriors with the second overall pick in the 2014 NBA Development League draft.

=== Utah Jazz (2015) ===
On January 7, 2015, Williams signed a 10-day contract with the Utah Jazz. On January 17, he signed a second 10-day contract with the Jazz, but after the contract expired, the Jazz decided to not retain him.

=== Return to Santa Cruz (2015) ===
Williams subsequently returned to Santa Cruz on January 27. On February 4, 2015, he was named to the Futures All-Star team for the 2015 NBA D-League All-Star Game. That same day, he signed a 10-day contract with the Charlotte Hornets. On February 10, he was waived by the Hornets before appearing in a game for them, and again returned to Santa Cruz.

=== New Orleans Pelicans (2015) ===
On March 4, Williams signed a 10-day contract with the New Orleans Pelicans. On March 14, he signed a second 10-day contract with the Pelicans.

=== Third stint with Santa Cruz (2015–2016) ===
Williams was not retained by the Pelicans following the expiration of his second 10-day contract on March 24, and subsequently returned to Santa Cruz two days later. On April 26, the Warriors claimed their first D-League championship as they defeated the Fort Wayne Mad Ants 2 games to 0. Along with his first D-League championship, Williams received the Finals MVP award.

On July 28, 2015, Williams signed with the Charlotte Hornets, returning to the team for a second stint. However, he was waived on October 23, after appearing in two preseason games. On November 12, he was reacquired by the Santa Cruz Warriors.

=== Memphis Grizzlies (2016) ===
On January 8, 2016, Williams signed a 10-day contract with the Memphis Grizzlies. He made his Grizzlies' debut that night in a 91–84 win over the Denver Nuggets, recording two points in nine minutes of action. After the contract expired, the Grizzlies decided to not retain him.

=== Fourth stint with Santa Cruz (2016) ===
On January 22, 2016, Williams returned to Santa Cruz. On January 29, he was named in the West All-Star team for the 2016 NBA D-League All-Star Game, earning his second straight All-Star nod.

=== Panathinaikos (2016) ===
On February 9, 2016, Williams left Santa Cruz and signed with Greek club Panathinaikos. In 10 EuroLeague games, he averaged 13.1 points, 2.8 rebounds, 1.0 assists, and 0.6 steals, in 26.3 minutes per game. In 17 Greek Basket League games, he averaged 11.5 points, 2.1 rebounds, 1.8 assists, and 0.8 steals, in 21.4 minutes per game.

=== Golden State Warriors (2016) ===
On September 16, 2016, Williams signed with the Golden State Warriors. However, he was later waived by the Warriors on October 20; he missed all six preseason games, due to right knee surgery.

== NBA career statistics ==
Legend
GP	Games played	GS	Games started	MPG	Minutes per game
FG%	Field goal percentage	3P%	3-point field goal percentage	FT%	Free throw percentage
RPG	Rebounds per game	APG	Assists per game	SPG	Steals per game
BPG	Blocks per game	PPG	Points per game	**Bold**	Career high

=== Regular season ===
Year	Team	GP	GS	MPG	FG%	3P%	FT%	RPG	APG	SPG	BPG	PPG
2011–12	Portland	24	0	6.2	**.500**	.296	.333	.8	.3	.3	**.1**	3.7
2013–14	Philadelphia	**67**	**2**	**17.3**	.415	.296	.731	**1.9**	**1.1**	**.5**	.0	**6.0**
2014–15	Utah	5	0	8.4	.462	**.714**	.500	.6	.8	.4	.0	3.6
2014–15	New Orleans	8	0	9.6	.333	.273	.000	.6	1.0	.3	.0	2.4
2015–16	Memphis	5	0	9.0	.200	.250	**.750**	.8	.8	.0	.0	1.6
**Career**		109	2	13.5	.421	.310	.669	1.5	.9	.4	.1	4.9
