= NBA G League Finals Most Valuable Player Award =

North American basketball award

The NBA G League Finals Most Valuable Player is an annual award given by the NBA G League since 2015, when the competition was known as the NBA Development League (D-League), to the best performing player of the championship series. Elliot Williams of the Santa Cruz Warriors was named the inaugural winner of the award after leading the Warriors to a 2–0 Finals series victory over the Fort Wayne Mad Ants in 2015.

== Winners ==
Denotes player that also won the regular season MVP that season.

Season	Player	Position	Nationality	Team
2014–15	Elliot Williams	Guard	United States	Santa Cruz Warriors
2015–16	Jarnell Stokes	Forward	United States	Sioux Falls Skyforce
2016–17	Pascal Siakam	Forward	Cameroon	Raptors 905
2017–18	Nick Johnson	Guard	United States	Austin Spurs
2018–19	Isaiah Hartenstein	Forward	Germany / United States	Rio Grande Valley Vipers
2019–20	Season not completed due to the COVID-19 pandemic			
2020–21	Devin Cannady	Guard	United States	Lakeland Magic
2021–22	Trevelin Queen	Guard	United States	Rio Grande Valley Vipers
2022–23	Jaden Springer	Guard	United States	Delaware Blue Coats
2023–24	Ousmane Dieng	Forward	France	Oklahoma City Blue
2024–25	Mason Jones	Guard	United States	Stockton Kings
2025–26	Tosan Evbuomwan	Forward	United Kingdom	Greensboro Swarm

== See also ==
- Bill Russell NBA Finals Most Valuable Player Award
