= NBA G League Team Executive of the Year Award =

The NBA Development League Team Executive of the Year is an annual NBA Development League (D-League) award given since the 2009–10 season to the top front office executive involved in team operations. The award is determined by peer voting and teams are not allowed to vote for themselves. Jon Jennings, the President and General Manager of the Maine Red Claws, was the inaugural winner. He was recognized for leading a team that sold out its inaugural season, led the league in merchandise sales and ticket revenue, and was among the top teams in sponsorship revenue. Matt Bresee would earn the honor during the Erie BayHawks' final season of operation as a sense of recognition for his work while the team operated under the three different teams that work beyond them now in the Osceola Magic, College Park Skyhawks, and Birmingham Squadron.

== Winners ==
Season	Executive	Team
2009–10	Jon Jennings	Maine Red Claws (1)
2010–11	Bert Garcia	Rio Grande Valley Vipers
2011–12	David Higdon	Bakersfield Jam
2012–13	Bill Boyce	Texas Legends
2013–14	Jeff Potter	Fort Wayne Mad Ants
2014–15	Tim Salier	Austin Spurs
2015–16	Mike Levy	Canton Charge
2016–17	Chris Murphy	Santa Cruz Warriors
2017–18	Steve Brandes	Wisconsin Herd (1)
2018–19	Malcolm Farmer	Texas Legends
2019–20	Dajuan Eubanks	Maine Red Claws (2)
2020–21	Matt Bresee	Erie BayHawks
2021–22	Steve Brandes	Wisconsin Herd (2)
2022–23	Ryan Grant	Iowa Wolves
2023–24	Steve Jbara	Grand Rapids Gold

== See also ==
- NBA Executive of the Year Award
