= NBA Development League Development Champion Award =

The NBA Development League's Development Champion honor was awarded annually to the NBA Development League (D-League) team that best embodies the league's goals of developing NBA basketball talent via call-ups and assignments. The Los Angeles D-Fenders were the inaugural winners in 2011–12.

== Winners ==
Season	Team
2011–12	Los Angeles D-Fenders
2012–13	Rio Grande Valley Vipers
2013–14	Santa Cruz Warriors
2014–15	Fort Wayne Mad Ants
