= Mason Jones (basketball) =

American basketball player (born 1998)

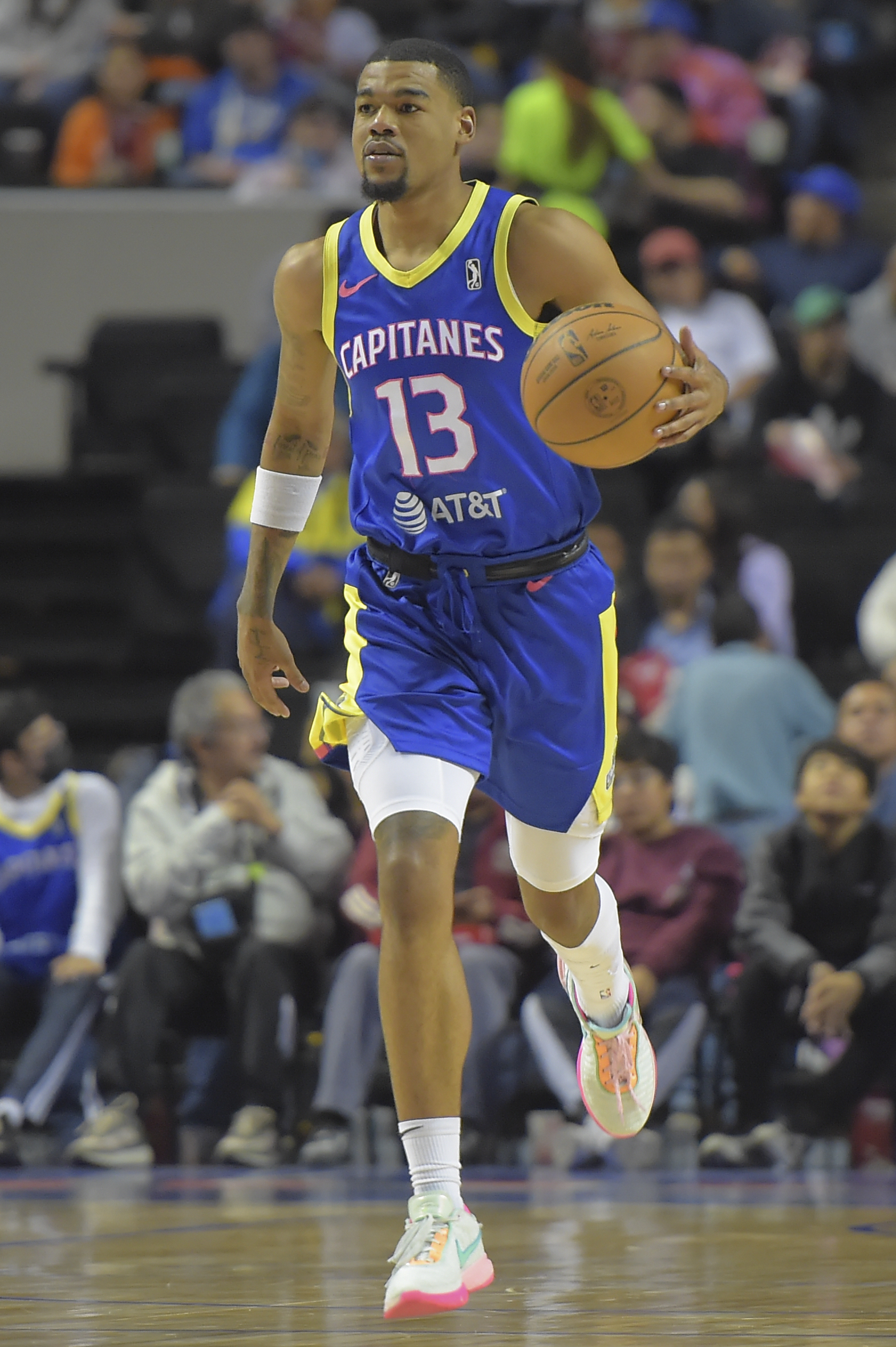
- Jones with the Mexico City Capitanes in 2022

No. 15 – Hong Kong Bulls
- Position: Shooting guard
- League: NBL

Personal information
- Born: July 21, 1998 (age 28) Dallas, Texas, U.S.
- Listed height: 6 ft 4 in (1.93 m)
- Listed weight: 200 lb (91 kg)

Career information
- High school: Triple A Academy (Dallas, Texas); Link Year Prep (Branson, Missouri)
- College: Connors State (2017–2018); Arkansas (2018–2020)
- NBA draft: 2020: undrafted
- Playing career: 2020–present

Career history
- 2020–2021: Houston Rockets
- 2021: Philadelphia 76ers
- 2021: South Bay Lakers
- 2021–2022: Los Angeles Lakers
- 2021–2022: →South Bay Lakers
- 2022–2023: Mexico City Capitanes
- 2023: Darüşşafaka
- 2023–2024: Stockton Kings
- 2024–2025: Sacramento Kings
- 2024–2025: →Stockton Kings
- 2025: Perth Wildcats
- 2025–present: Hong Kong Bulls

Career highlights
- NBL champion (2026); NBA G League champion (2025); NBA G League Finals MVP (2025); All-NBA G League First Team (2022); 2× All-NBA G League Second Team (2024, 2025); AP Honorable Mention All-American (2020); SEC co-Player of the Year – AP (2020); First team All-SEC (2020)
- Stats at NBA.com
- Stats at Basketball Reference

Mason Christopher Jones (born July 21, 1998) is an American professional basketball player for the Hong Kong Bulls of the Chinese National Basketball League. He played college basketball for the Connors State Cowboys and the Arkansas Razorbacks. He debuted in the National Basketball Association (NBA) in 2020, playing since then for the Houston Rockets, Philadelphia 76ers, Los Angeles Lakers and Sacramento Kings. In 2025, he helped the Stockton Kings win the NBA G League champion behind his Finals MVP performance.

== Early life ==
Jones grew up in DeSoto, Texas and did not play basketball until his senior year of high school at Triple A Academy in Dallas, Texas. That year, he averaged 15.9 points, 5.7 rebounds, and 4.1 assists per game. Jones played at Link Year Prep in Branson, Missouri for a postgraduate year, trimming his weight down from 265 pounds from his senior year of high school to 230 by the end of the season.

== College career ==
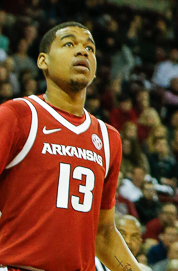
Jones with Arkansas in 2019

Jones played his freshman season at Connors State College. He averaged 15.5 points, 6.9 rebounds and 2.5 assists per game in his only season for the Cowboys. Jones committed to transfer to Arkansas following the end of the season over offers from BYU and Washington.

In his first season with the Razorbacks, Jones finished third on the team with 13.9 points per game and second with 3.9 rebounds per game. Jones scored 23 points to help lead Arkansas to a 70–60 over Georgia. Jones scored a season-high 30 points twice against Florida and Mississippi State.

Jones entered his junior season as the team's leading returning rebounder and the second leading scorer. Jones was named the Southeastern Conference (SEC) Player of the Week after scoring 32 points with seven rebounds and five steals in a 91–43 Rice. He scored a career-high 41 points in a 98–79 win over Tulsa on December 14, 2019, and was again named the SEC Player of the Week. Jones scored 34 points in a 79–77 loss to South Carolina on January 30, 2020, followed by a 30-point performance in an 82–78 win over Alabama two days later and was named the Player of the Week for the third time. On February 4, Jones scored 40 points in a 79–76 loss to Auburn in a game in which the Razorbacks' second-leading scorer Isaiah Joe did not play due to knee surgery. Jones became the third SEC player alongside Shaquille O'Neal and Jodie Meeks with multiple 40-point games and the first player in Arkansas history to score at least 30 points in three straight games. Jones scored 38 points in 78–77 loss to Mississippi State. Jones scored 38 points on February 26, 2020, in an 86–69 win over Tennessee and scored his 1,000th career point during the game, becoming the fifth fastest Razorback to reach the milestone and the eighth player in school history to do so in his first two seasons with the team. At the conclusion of the regular season, Jones was named First Team All-SEC and was named co-SEC Player of the Year by the Associated Press along with Reggie Perry of Mississippi State. Jones averaged 22 points, 5.5 rebounds, and 3.4 assists per game, shooting 45.3 percent from the floor. After the season, he declared for the 2020 NBA draft but did not sign with an agent.

== Professional career ==
=== Houston Rockets (2020–2021) ===
After going undrafted in the 2020 NBA draft, Jones signed a two-way contract with the Houston Rockets on November 26, 2020. He was waived on March 8, 2021. On March 12, he signed a 10-day contract with the Rockets. He appeared in 26 games for the Rockets during the 2020–21 season.

=== Philadelphia 76ers (2021) ===
On March 26, 2021, Jones signed a two-way contract with the Philadelphia 76ers. On May 6, he was waived by the 76ers. He appeared in four games for the 76ers.

Jones played for the Washington Wizards in the 2021 NBA Summer League.

=== South Bay / Los Angeles Lakers (2021–2022) ===
On November 6, 2021, Jones was acquired by the South Bay Lakers of the NBA G League.

On December 21, 2021, after 12 games with South Bay, Jones signed a two-way contract with the Los Angeles Lakers. He played four games for Los Angeles over the rest of the 2021–22 season, and finished the 2021–22 NBA G League season with 40 games for South Bay.

Jones played for the Los Angeles Lakers in the 2022 NBA Summer League.

=== Mexico City Capitanes (2022–2023) ===
On October 11, 2022, Jones was acquired by the Mexico City Capitanes of the NBA G League. He appeared in 38 games for the Capitanes during the 2022–23 NBA G League season.

=== Darüşşafaka Lassa (2023) ===
On July 16, 2023, Jones signed with Darüşşafaka Lassa of the Basketbol Süper Ligi (BSL). He appeared in five BSL games and three BCL games to start the 2023–24 season.

=== Sacramento / Stockton Kings (2023–2025) ===
On December 8, 2023, Jones was acquired by the Stockton Kings of the NBA G League. On February 9, 2024, he signed a two-way contract with the Sacramento Kings. He appeared in five games for Sacramento to finish the 2023–24 season. He also made 29 appearances for Stockton during the 2023–24 NBA G League season.

Jones played for the Sacramento Kings in the 2024 NBA Summer League.

In the 2024–25 season, Jones played 10 games for Sacramento and 32 games for Stockton. He helped Stockton win the 2024–25 NBA G League championship behind his Finals MVP performance. In the three-game series against the Osceola Magic, he averaged 22.3 points, 9.7 assists, 3.0 rebounds, and 2.7 steals per game and made 11-of-25 three-point shots (44.0%).

Jones played for the Sacramento Kings in the 2025 NBA Summer League.

=== Perth Wildcats (2025) ===
On September 8, 2025, Jones signed with the Perth Wildcats of the Australian National Basketball League for the 2025–26 season. On October 17, he was released by the Wildcats after the team started the season with a 3–2 record.

=== Hong Kong Bulls (2025–present) ===
In December 2025, Jones joined the Hong Kong Bulls of the Chinese National Basketball League.

== Career statistics ==
Legend
GP	Games played	GS	Games started	MPG	Minutes per game
FG%	Field goal percentage	3P%	3-point field goal percentage	FT%	Free throw percentage
RPG	Rebounds per game	APG	Assists per game	SPG	Steals per game
BPG	Blocks per game	PPG	Points per game	**Bold**	Career high

=== NBA ===
==== Regular season ====
Year	Team	GP	GS	MPG	FG%	3P%	FT%	RPG	APG	SPG	BPG	PPG
2020–21	Houston	**26**	**1**	11.8	.412	.359	.614	2.0	**1.5**	.2	.0	5.8
2020–21	Philadelphia	6	0	4.5	**.556**	**.500**	.714	.7	.5	.2	.0	2.7
2021–22	L.A. Lakers	4	0	**12.6**	.467	.250	**.800**	**2.5**	1.0	**.5**	.0	**6.8**
2023–24	Sacramento	5	0	5.6	.250	.286	.500	1.0	1.0	.2	.0	1.4
2024–25	Sacramento	10	0	4.5	.500	.125	.800	.9	1.1	.0	.1	2.3
Career		51	1	9.0	.427	.329	.663	1.5	1.2	.2	.0	4.4

=== College ===
==== NCAA Division I ====
Year	Team	GP	GS	MPG	FG%	3P%	FT%	RPG	APG	SPG	BPG	PPG
2018–19	Arkansas	**34**	26	29.3	.404	**.365**	.804	3.9	2.8	.9	.1	13.6
2019–20	Arkansas	31	**30**	**33.9**	**.453**	.351	**.826**	**5.5**	**3.4**	**1.6**	**.2**	**22.0**
Career		65	56	31.5	.431	.358	.819	4.6	3.1	1.2	.2	17.6

==== NJCAA ====
Year	Team	GP	GS	MPG	FG%	3P%	FT%	RPG	APG	SPG	BPG	PPG
2017–18	Connors State	35	25	–	.515	.429	.774	6.9	2.5	1.5	.7	15.5

== Personal life ==
Jones' older brother, Matt Jones, played college basketball at Duke and has played professionally in the NBA G League and overseas.
