= 2016 Magyar Kupa (men's basketball) =

2016 Zsíros Tibor Magyar Kupa
Tournament details
- Arena: SYMA Csarnok; Budapest
- Dates: 19–21 February 2016

Final positions
- Champions: Egis Körmend; 7th title
- Runners-up: Szolnoki Olaj KK
- Third place: Sopron KC
- Fourth place: PVSK-Pannonpower

The 2016 Magyar Kupa (men's basketball) was the 50th season of the Hungarian Basketball Cup. Egis Körmend won its 7th national Cup championship. Trey McKinney-Jones was named Most Valuable Player. The tournament was held at the SYMA Sports and Conference Center in Budapest.

== Qualification ==
Teams qualified based on their position in the 2015–16 Nemzeti Bajnokság I/A (men's basketball) season.

== Bracket ==
Quarterfinals
Sopron KC	72
Zalakerámia ZTE KK	68
Atomerőmű SE	88
Egis Körmend	93
PVSK-Pannonpower	81
Falco-Trend Optika KC	61
Szolnoki Olaj KK	87
TLI-Alba Fehérvár	86

Semifinals
Sopron KC	72
Egis Körmend	74
PVSK-Pannonpower	69
Szolnoki Olaj KK	92

Finals
Egis Körmend	68
Szolnoki Olaj KK	55

== Final ==
21 February 2016	Szolnoki Olaj	55–68	Egis Körmend	Budapest
17:30 (CET)	Scoring by quarter: 18–17, 18-10, 8–22, 11–19
	Pts: D. Vojvoda 18; Rebs: S. Milošević 10; PIR: S. Milošević 17	Boxscore	Pts: T. McKinney-Jones 20; Rebs: T. McKinney-Jones 9 PIR: P. Petty, T. McKinney-Jones 25	Arena: SYMA Sports and Conference Center; Attendance: 3,500; Referees: Tamás Földházi, Zoltán Pálla, Gellért Kapitány

Szolnoki Olaj	Körmend

Hungarian Basketball Cup Finals
9th Final
21 February 2016 - SYMA-csarnok

Szolnoki Olaj KK - Egis Körmend 55-68 (36-27), Quarters: 18-17, 36-27, 44-49, 55-68. Referees: Földházi, Pálla, Kapitány

Szolnoki Olaj (Pór): Wittmann 6, P. Kovács 3, Vojvoda 18, Milošević 8, Gregory 2 / Burrel 9, Keller 5, Borisov, Jones 4.

Körmend (Čizmić): Petty 19, Channels 13, McKinney-Jones 20, Farkas, Duinker 8 / N. Tóth 6, Ferencz, Lakosa, Dickerson 2.

== See also ==
- 2015–16 Nemzeti Bajnokság I/A
