= Chris Hunter (basketball) =

American basketball player (born 1984)

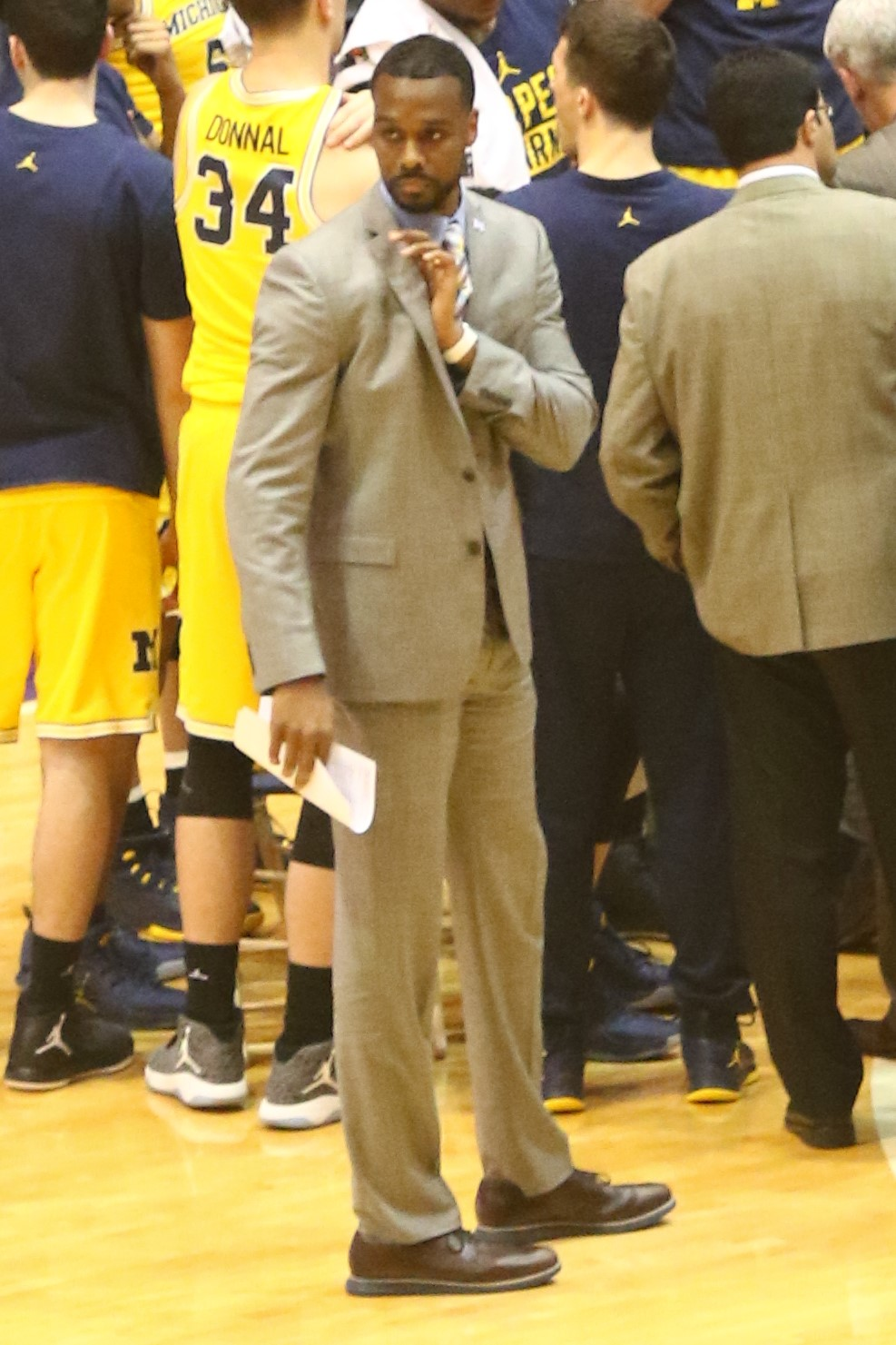
- Hunter as Director of Program Personnel for the 2016–17 Michigan Wolverines

Personal information
- Born: July 7, 1984 (age 42) Gary, Indiana, U.S.
- Listed height: 6 ft 11 in (2.11 m)
- Listed weight: 240 lb (109 kg)

Career information
- High school: West Side (Gary, Indiana)
- College: Michigan (2002–2006)
- NBA draft: 2006: undrafted
- Playing career: 2006–2013
- Position: Power forward / center
- Number: 31

Career history
- 2006–2007: AZS Koszalin
- 2007: Spotter Leuven
- 2008–2009: Fort Wayne Mad Ants
- 2009–2010: Golden State Warriors
- 2010–2013: Fort Wayne Mad Ants

Career highlights
- NBA D-League All-Star (2009); All-NBA D-League Second Team (2009)
- Stats at NBA.com
- Stats at Basketball Reference

Christopher Edmond Hunter (born July 7, 1984) is an American former professional basketball player and currently works as the Director of Operations for the University of Michigan men's basketball team, where he also played college basketball. Before joining the Michigan Wolverines men's basketball staff, he played in several professional leagues. Most notably, he played in 60 games for the Golden State Warriors of the NBA, was an NBA Development League All-star in 2009 and played abroad.

== Professional career ==
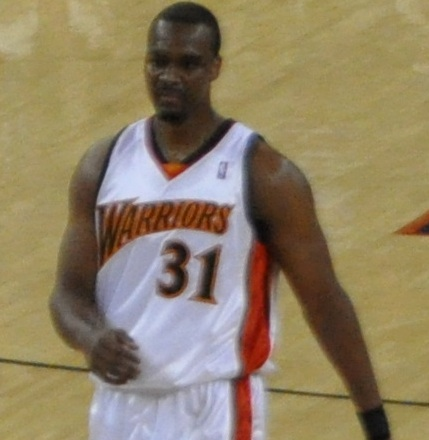
Hunter as a Golden State Warrior in 2009

In 2006, Hunter signed with Herens Basket of Switzerland before being released before the start of the season. He then signed with AZS Koszalin of Poland.

In 2007, Hunter signed with Spotter Leuven of the BNXT League. He was later released in December 2007 due to injury.

In November 2008, Hunter was acquired by the Fort Wayne Mad Ants. He was an NBA D League All-Star in 2009. On April 14, 2009, Hunter signed with the New York Knicks. On October 22, he was waived by the Knicks before appearing in a regular season game. On November 1, he was re-acquired by the Mad Ants. On November 20, Hunter signed with the Golden State Warriors, making him the first call-up of the 2009–10 NBA D-League season.

Hunter joined the Knicks for the 2010 NBA Summer League. On October 30, 2010, he was re-acquired by the Mad Ants. On December 28, Hunter was waived by the Mad Ants due to an injury.

In November 2011, Hunter was again re-acquired by the Mad Ants. On December 12, 2011, he signed with the Knicks. However, Hunter was waived by New York on December 22. He then subsequently returned to the Mad Ants. In January 2012, Hunter was again waived due to injury. He later joined the Los Angeles Clippers for the 2012 NBA Summer League.

On November 5, 2013, Hunter was re-acquired by the Fort Wayne Mad Ants. On December 23, he was waived by the Mad Ants.

== Post-playing career ==
On September 5, 2014, Hunter was named as the Michigan Wolverines' Director of Player Personnel. On August 4, 2017, Michigan promoted Hunter from director of player personnel to director of basketball operations.

== Personal life ==
Hunter is married with three children.

== Career statistics ==
Legend
GP	Games played	GS	Games started	MPG	Minutes per game
FG%	Field goal percentage	3P%	3-point field goal percentage	FT%	Free throw percentage
RPG	Rebounds per game	APG	Assists per game	SPG	Steals per game
BPG	Blocks per game	PPG	Points per game	**Bold**	Career high

=== NBA ===
==== Regular season ====
Year	Team	GP	GS	MPG	FG%	3P%	FT%	RPG	APG	SPG	BPG	PPG
2009–10	Golden State	60	9	13.1	.502	.000	.754	2.8	.6	.2	.6	4.5
