= Makénéné =

- Commune and town
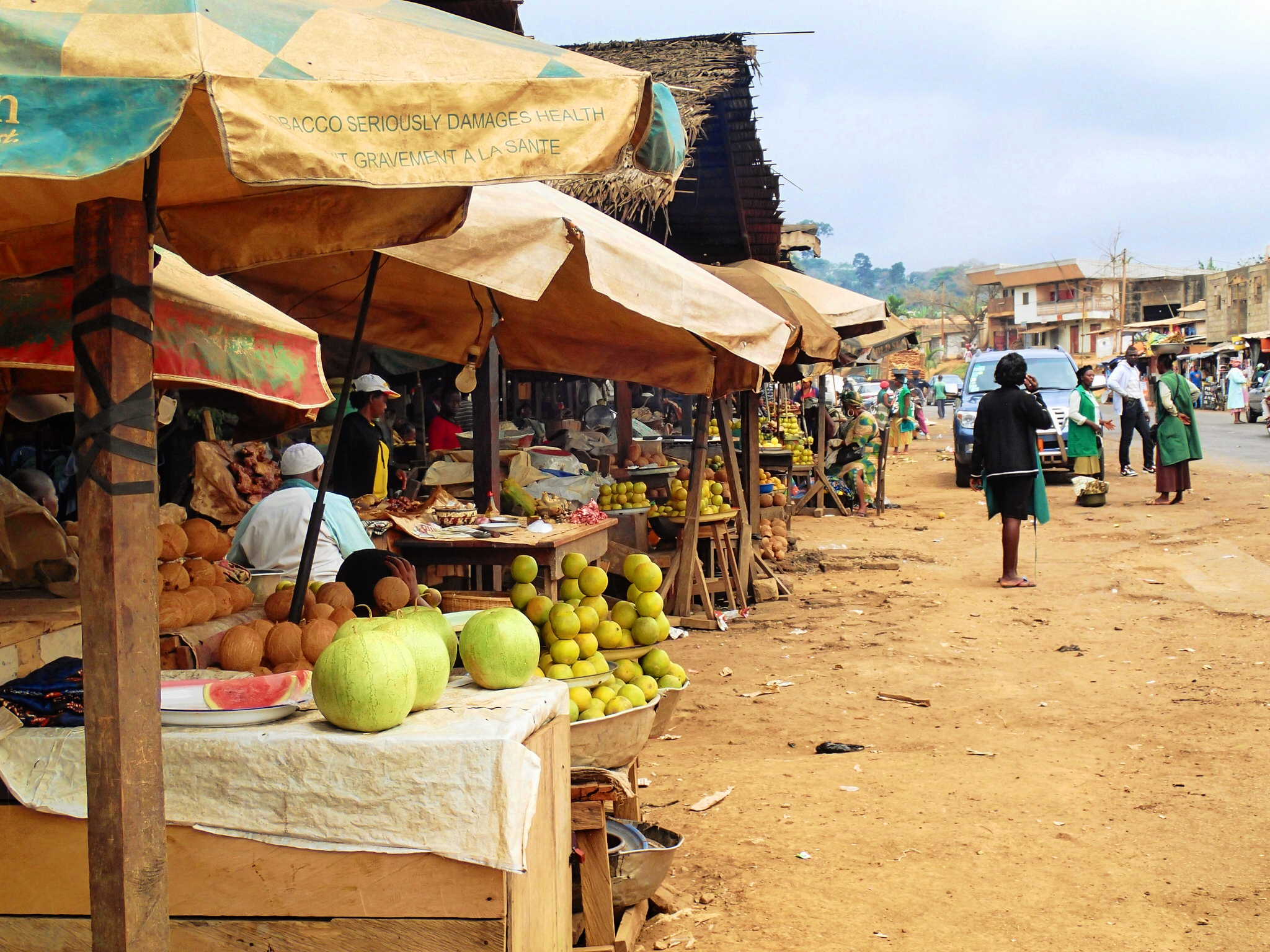
- Market in Makénéné

- Location within Cameroon
- Coordinates: 4°53.03′N 10°47.53′E
- Country: Cameroon
- Region: Centre
- Department: Mbam-et-Inoubou

Population (2005)
  - Total: 16,564
- Time zone: UTC+1 (WAT)

Makénéné is a town and commune in Cameroon. It is located in the Mbam-et-Inoubou department of the Centre region.

According to the 2005 census, the commune had a population of 16,564.

== Transportation ==
Cameroon National Highway N4 is the main road in Makénéné and paved route.

Transportation within Makénéné are mainly taxis, urban buses. Regional buses connect Makénéné with neighbouring areas via N4.

== Notable people from Makénéné ==
- Tchamo Bosco Siakam former mayor of the town (2007-2015)
- Pascal Siakam, a Cameroonian professional basketball player for the Indiana Pacers of the National Basketball Association (NBA), son Tchamo Bosco Siakam
- David Leon Mayebi (1954-2016) former footballer and manager; deceased in 2016 and father of footballer Joslain Mayebi

== Communities within Makénéné ==
Villages within Makénéné are clustered along Cameroon National Highway N4:

The villages to the north end are mostly rural and sparsely populated:

- Kinding-Nde - located in the northwest over the boundary between Central and West Regions
- Kinding-Ndjabi - located in the northwest and directly south of Kinding-Nde
- Nyokon is divided into 4 smaller divisions:
  - Nyokon I
  - Nyokon II
  - Nyokon III
  - Nyokon IV

Most of the population in the commune lives in the south:

- Makénéné I - located in the south end of the commune and one of the two larger areas of the commune
- Makénéné II - located in the south end of the commune and just northwest of Makénéné I

== See also ==
- Communes of Cameroon
