= Pascal Siakam =

Cameroonian basketball player (born 1994)

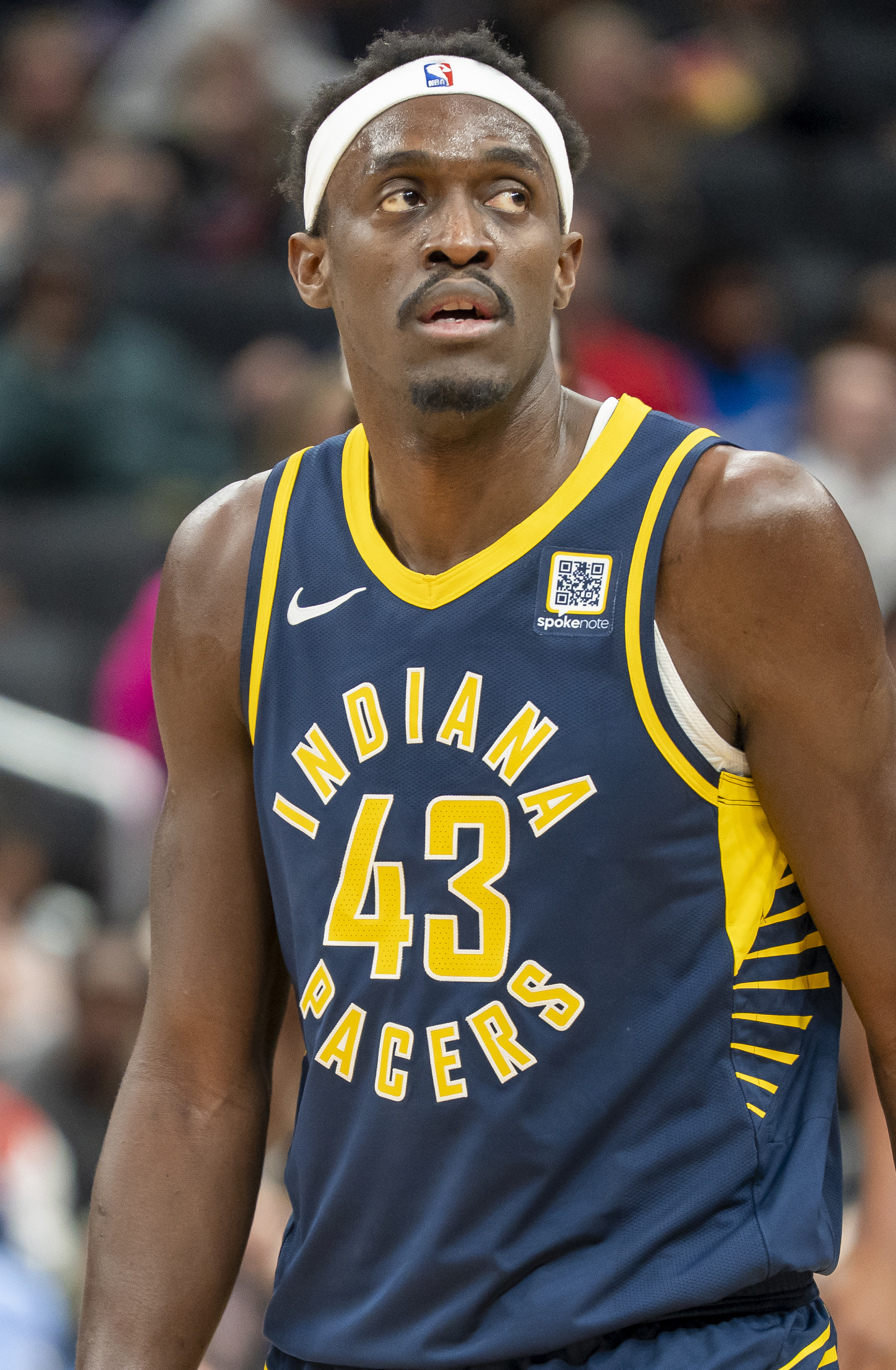
- Siakam with the Indiana Pacers in 2025

No. 43 – Indiana Pacers
- Position: Power forward
- League: NBA

Personal information
- Born: 2 April 1994 (age 32) Douala, Cameroon
- Listed height: 6 ft 9 in (2.06 m)
- Listed weight: 245 lb (111 kg)

Career information
- High school: God's Academy (Lewisville, Texas)
- College: New Mexico State (2014–2016)
- NBA draft: 2016: 1st round, 27th overall pick
- Drafted by: Toronto Raptors
- Playing career: 2016–present

Career history
- 2016–2024: Toronto Raptors
- 2017: →Raptors 905
- 2024–present: Indiana Pacers

Career highlights
- NBA champion (2019); 4× NBA All-Star (2020, 2023, 2025, 2026); All-NBA Second Team (2020); All-NBA Third Team (2022); NBA Eastern Conference finals MVP (2025); NBA Most Improved Player (2019); NBA D-League champion (2017); NBA D-League Finals MVP (2017); AP Honorable mention All-American (2016); WAC Player of the Year (2016); 2× First-team All-WAC (2015, 2016); WAC Freshman of the Year (2015)
- Stats at NBA.com
- Stats at Basketball Reference

Pascal Siakam (/siˈɑːkəm/ see-AH-kəm; born 2 April 1994) is a Cameroonian professional basketball player for the Indiana Pacers of the National Basketball Association (NBA). A four-time NBA All-Star and two-time All-NBA selection, he won an NBA championship with the Toronto Raptors in 2019. Nicknamed "Spicy P", Siakam played college basketball for the New Mexico State Aggies and was named the Western Athletic Conference Player of the Year in 2016. He was selected by Toronto with the 27th overall pick in the first round of the 2016 NBA draft.

After being assigned to the NBA Development League (now the G League) as a rookie in 2017, Siakam led Toronto's affiliate team to a league championship, earning Finals Most Valuable Player (MVP) honors. He was named the NBA Most Improved Player in 2019, becoming the first player to win the award and an NBA title in the same season. The following year, Siakam led Toronto to the second-best record in the league, earning All-NBA Second Team while being named a starter in his first NBA All-Star Game. He became the first player to play in the G League and to start an All-Star game. After a second All-Star selection in 2023, Siakam was traded to the Pacers during the 2023–24 season. In 2025, he earned a third All-Star appearance and was named the Eastern Conference finals MVP en route to his second NBA Finals appearance. In 2026, he earned a fourth All-Star appearance.

== Early life ==
Siakam was born in Douala, Cameroon, to Tchamo and Victorie Siakam. He was the youngest of four brothers. His father, Tchamo, worked for a local transit company and was also the mayor of Makénéné. According to a story by Jackie MacMullan of ESPN, Pascal was effectively "hand-picked to embody his family's Catholicism." His father thus enrolled him in St. Andrew's Seminary in Bafia at age 11. By the time he was 15, he did not want to become a Catholic priest.

Siakam initially had little interest in basketball in stark contrast to his older brothers, all of whom earned scholarships with the sport to various NCAA Division I colleges. He was discovered as a player at a local camp by Luc Mbah a Moute, whose parents' home in Bafia was about two miles (3.2 km) from St. Andrew's. Siakam attended Mbah a Moute's camp for the first time in 2011, a year before graduating from St. Andrew's, and he returned to it the following year, after which he was selected to attend the Basketball Without Borders camp. There, despite having had virtually no basketball experience at the time, he gained attention for his apparent athleticism and extremely high energy level. As Raptors president Masai Ujiri, who had been at this camp, recalled, "His effort was memorable." With Mbah a Moute as a mentor, Siakam moved to the United States at the age of 18. He went from one camp to the next to hone his skills before settling in Lewisville, Texas, and attending God's Academy. While at this preparatory school, Siakam was neither widely known nor initially eligible, but he was at least pursued by New Mexico State University; the Aggies' coach Marvin Menzies had Siakam on his radar since his pipeline of connections spanned several continents and his roster included nine foreign-born players.

== College career ==
Siakam enrolled at New Mexico State University in 2013. After redshirting the 2013–14 season due to injury, he worked his way onto the Aggies' starting lineup and then to Western Athletic Conference (WAC) Freshman of the Year honors by the 2014–15 campaign. For the 2015–16 campaign, he averaged 20.2 points, 11.6 rebounds and 2.2 blocks across 34 games en route to earning unanimous WAC Player of the Year honors. On 19 April 2016, Siakam declared for the NBA draft, forgoing his final two years of college eligibility.

== Professional career ==
=== Toronto Raptors (2016–2024) ===
==== 2016–17 season: G League champion and Finals MVP ====
On 23 June 2016, Siakam was selected by the Toronto Raptors with the 27th overall pick in the NBA draft, with the franchise signing him to a rookie-scale contract on 9 July. On 26 October, he became the first rookie to start for the Raptors' season-opener since Jonas Valančiūnas did so in 2012; rising to the occasion, he hauled in 9 rebounds and notched 4 points in 21 minutes as Toronto beat the Detroit Pistons, 109–91. It marked not only his NBA debut, but also the first NBA game that he had ever seen in person. On 3 December, Siakam scored a season-high 14 points, which came in a 128–84 victory over the Atlanta Hawks. On 1 January 2017, during a 123–114 win over the Los Angeles Lakers, he pulled down a season-high 10 rebounds.

In his rookie season, Siakam started in as many as 38 games at power forward, including the first 35 of the 2016–17 campaign, because Jared Sullinger was out with injury. From 21 February through 28 April, he was alternately assigned to the Raptors 905 of the G League and recalled from it. Accordingly, between games played for the Raptors, he led Toronto's affiliate team to the finals and helped them win a title by defeating the Rio Grande Valley Vipers 2–1 in the series. After averaging 23 points and 9 rebounds in that series, he was named the G League Finals MVP.

==== 2017–18 season: Sophomore improvement ====
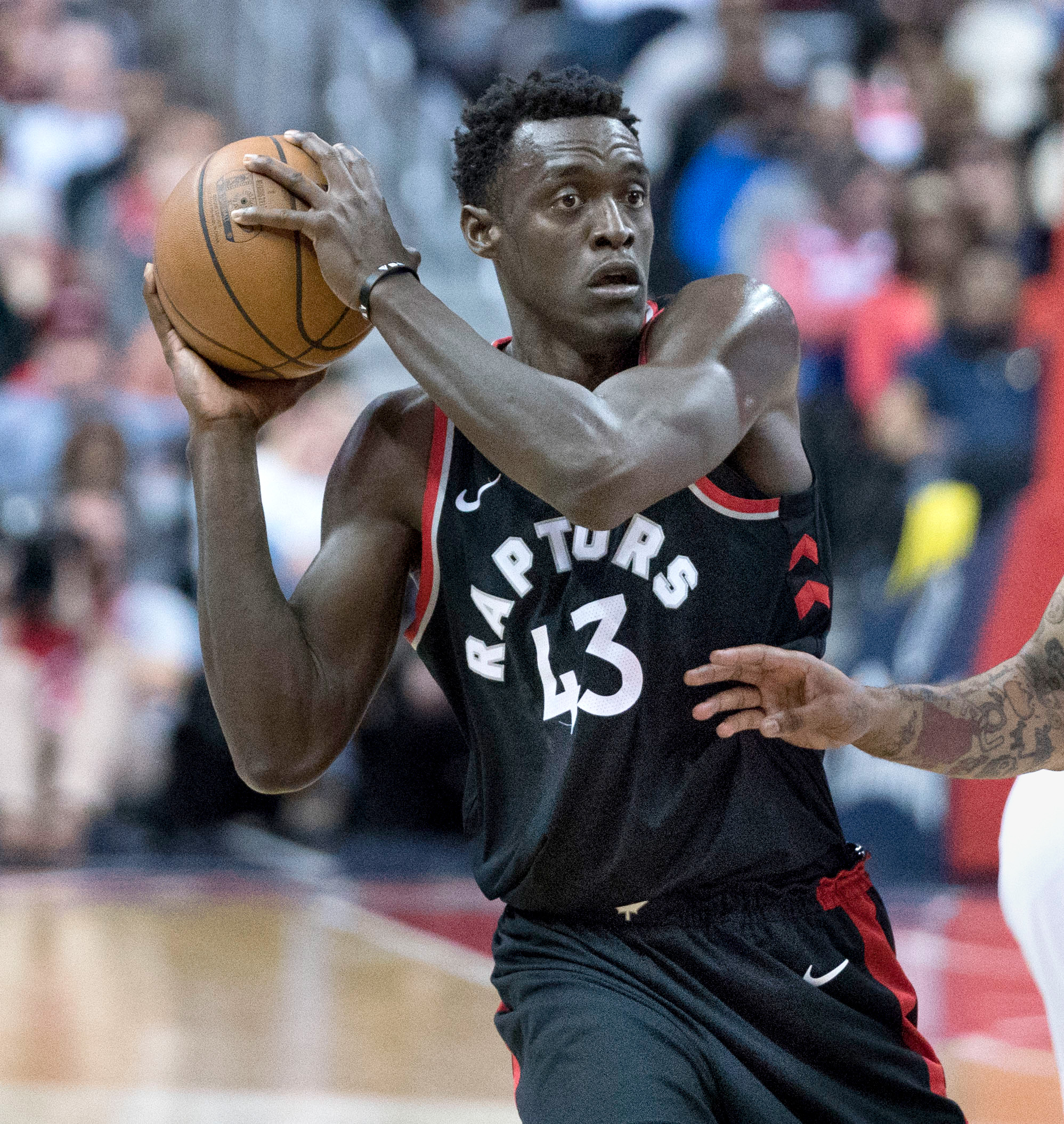
Siakam in 2018

In his second year in the NBA, Siakam cemented himself as a productive bench contributor for Toronto. He recorded a then-career-high 20 points during a 117–112 loss to the Golden State Warriors on 25 October 2017. For the 2017–18 season, the Raptors' offensive rating was four points better with Siakam on the floor, compared to seven points worse his rookie year. His averages improved from 4.3 points per game to 7.3, from 3.4 rebounds per game to 4.5, and from 0.3 assists per game to 2.0. He drew comparisons to Warriors' forward Draymond Green for such qualities as his rare ability to guard all positions, his shrewd basketball knowledge, and internal confidence.

==== 2018–19 season: NBA champion and Most Improved Player ====
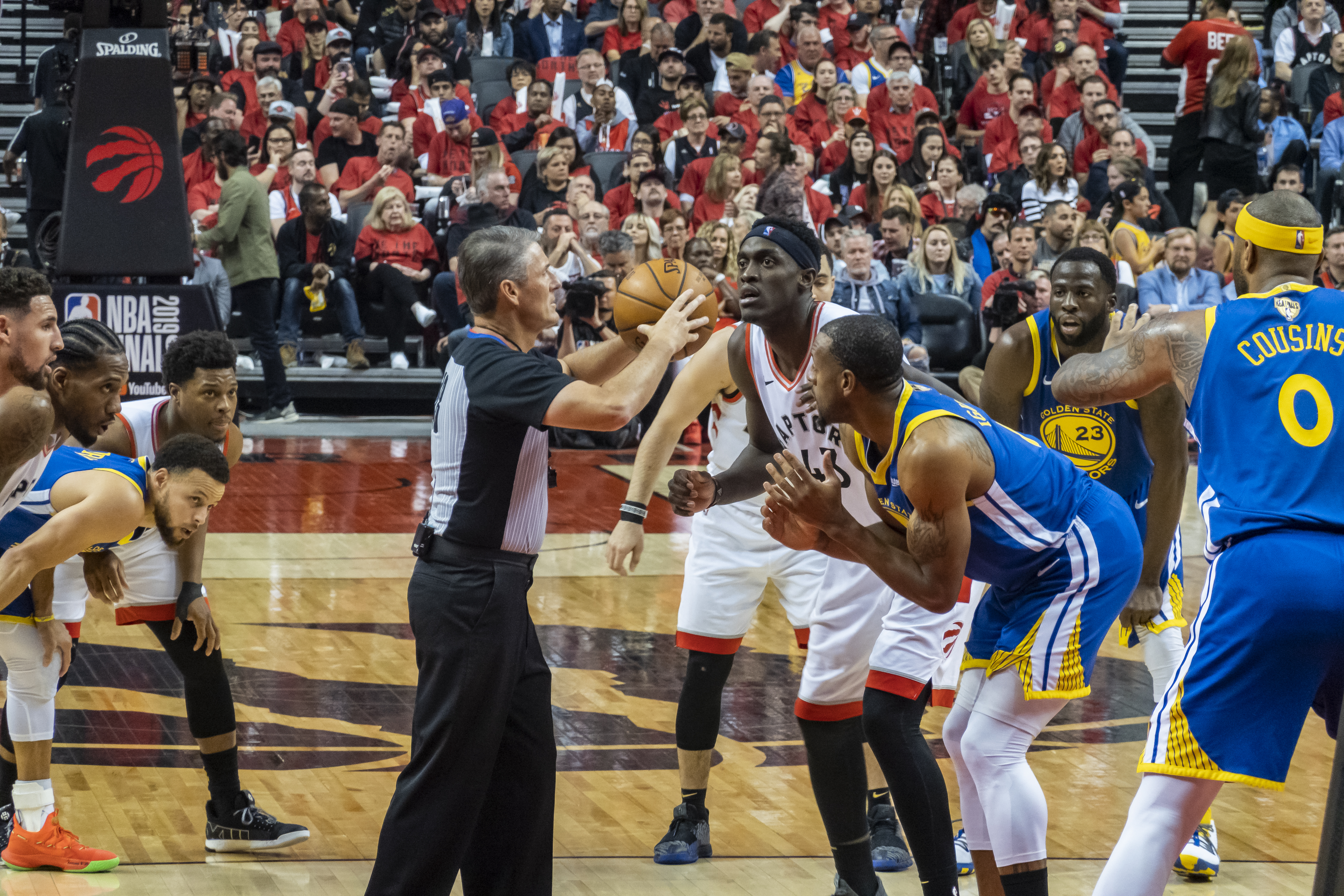
Siakam readying for a jump ball against Andre Iguodala during game 2 of the 2019 NBA Finals

Heading into the 2018–19 campaign, Siakam emerged as a two-way force, and he averaged 16.9 points a night to go along with 6.9 rebounds and 3.1 assists; he also made a marked improvement in shooting from distance, increasing his three-point percentage by 36%. He surpassed his previous career high on 29 October 2018, posting 22 points during a 124–109 loss to the Milwaukee Bucks. On 10 November, he set a new career high with 23 points scored in a 128–112 victory over the New York Knicks. Siakam was named the Eastern Conference Player of the Week for games played 5 to 11 November, thus becoming the eighth Raptor in franchise history to earn the award after DeMar DeRozan (10 times), Vince Carter (7 times), Chris Bosh (7 times), Kyle Lowry (4 times), Mike James, Jalen Rose and Lou Williams. On 13 January, Siakam recorded 24 points and a career-high 19 rebounds in a 140–138 double-overtime win versus the Washington Wizards. On 13 February, he racked up a new career-high 44 points and hit a career-best 4 three-pointers in a 129–120 win over the Wizards; he thus became the 11th Raptor in franchise history to reach the 40-point plateau.

In game 3 of the Raptors' first-round playoff series against the Orlando Magic, Siakam tallied 30 points and 11 rebounds in the 98–93 victory. In game 1 of the second round, Siakam posted 29 points and 7 rebounds on 12-of-15 shooting from the field in a 108–95 victory over the Philadelphia 76ers. In game 3 of the Eastern Conference Finals, Siakam helped Toronto defeat Milwaukee in double-overtime, 118–112, putting up 25 points and bringing down 11 rebounds; the win cut the Bucks' series lead to 2–1. In game 6, Siakam converted 18 points for his part in the 100–94 win over Milwaukee; the victory clinched the series and propelled the Raptors to the NBA Finals for the first time in franchise history. In game 1 of the 2019 Finals, Siakam scored a then playoff career-high 32 points with 8 rebounds, 5 assists and 2 blocks on 14-of-17 shooting from the field in a 118–109 victory over the Golden State Warriors. In game 6 of the 2019 Finals, Siakam recorded a team high 26 points, 10 rebounds, 3 assists and hit the clinching shot for the title over Draymond Green, He went on to help the Raptors defeat the Warriors in six games and thus capture their first NBA championship in franchise history. At the 2019 Awards ceremony later that month, Siakam was named the NBA's Most Improved Player for the 2018–19 season. On 19 October 2019, Siakam agreed to a four-year, $130 million extension with Toronto.

==== 2019–20 season: First All-Star and All-NBA appearances ====
Siakam recorded 34 points, 18 rebounds, 5 assists and 1 block in 38 minutes played of the NBA's season-opening game to help the Raptors beat the New Orleans Pelicans 130–122. He also matched his career highs in both offensive rebounds and made free throws, and set a new career high in field goals attempted. On 8 November, Siakam scored a career-high 44 points in a 122–104 win over the Pelicans. On 13 November, Siakam scored 36 points in a 114–106 win over the Portland Trail Blazers. On 1 December, Siakam scored 35 points in a 130–110 win over the Utah Jazz. On 23 January 2020, Siakam was selected to his first career All-Star nod, being named a starter in the 2020 NBA All-Star Game, Siakam became the first player to play in the G League to start in the All-Star game. On 26 January, Siakam would again score 35 points in a 110–106 win over the San Antonio Spurs. On 21 February, Siakam scored 37 points along with 12 rebounds, in a 118–101 win over the Phoenix Suns. On 16 September, Siakam was named to the All-NBA Second Team.

==== 2020–21 season: Tampa season and development ====
On 6 January 2021, Siakam scored a season-high 32 points in a 123–115 loss against the Phoenix Suns. On 8 January, Siakam had 17 points, nine rebounds and a career-high 12 assists in a 144–123 win against the Sacramento Kings. On 11 January, Siakam had his first career triple-double with 22 points, 13 rebounds and 10 assists in a 112–111 loss against the Portland Trail Blazers. On 29 January, Siakam tied his season-high 32 points in a 126–124 loss against the Kings. On 5 February, Siakam had a new season high of 33 points while also getting 11 rebounds, six assists, three steals and a block in a 123–117 win against the Brooklyn Nets. On 2 May, Siakam scored a new season-high 39 points with 13 rebounds, four assists, two steals and two blocks in a 121–114 win against the Los Angeles Lakers. On 6 May, Siakam tied his career high with 44 points along with 11 rebounds, seven assists and a steal in a 131–129 loss to the Washington Wizards.

==== 2021–22 season: Second All-NBA selection ====
On 7 November 2021, Siakam made his season debut coming off surgery scoring 15 points on a minutes restriction against the Brooklyn Nets. On 19 November, Siakam recorded 32 points, 8 rebounds and 8 assists in a 108–89 win against the Sacramento Kings. On 31 December, in a 116–108 win against the Los Angeles Clippers, Siakam had a statline of 25 points, a season-high 19 rebounds and 7 assists. On 5 January 2022, Siakam scored 33 points in a 117–111 win over the reigning champions Milwaukee Bucks. On 15 January, Siakam recorded a statline of 30 points 10 assists and 8 rebounds in a 103–96 win with against the Milwaukee Bucks, the NBA stripping Siakam of two rebounds after previously recording 10 rebounds. On 25 January, Siakam tied his career best with 12 assists along with 24 points and 9 rebounds in a 125–113 win against the Charlotte Hornets.

On 7 February, Siakam was named Eastern Conference Player of the Week for games played 31 January to 6 February. He was averaging 25 points, 10.5 rebounds, 4.8 assists, 1.8 steals and 0.8 blocks leading the team to a 4–0 record in the week. On 9 February, Siakam lead Toronto to their seventh straight win, logging 27 points, 16 rebounds and 5 assists on 13-of-17 shooting from the field in a blowout 117–98 win over the Oklahoma City Thunder. Siakam broke Chris Bosh's record of 20/10/5 games in a season with nine 20/10/5 games, surpassing Bosh's 8. On 12 February, Siakam scored a then season-high 35 points, grabbed 10 rebounds, dished out 7 assists and had 2 steals in a 110–109 loss to the Denver Nuggets. On 28 March, Siakam scored 25 of his season-high 40 points in the first half, grabbed 13 rebounds along with 3 steals and 2 blocks in a 115–112 overtime win over the Boston Celtics. On 7 April, Siakam recorded his third career triple-double with 37 points, 11 rebounds, 12 assists and 2 steals prompted the home fans to chant "MVP" in a 119–114 win over the Philadelphia 76ers. Siakam finished the regular season averaging a career high in rebounds, assists and steals.

On 16 April, during game 1 of the first round of the playoffs, Siakam logged 24 points, seven assists and three blocks in a 131–111 loss to the Philadelphia 76ers. On 23 April, he posted a playoff career-high 34 points along with 8 rebounds, 5 assists and 2 blocks in a 110–102 game 4 win. On 25 April, he scored 23 points with 10 rebounds and 7 assists in a 103–88 game 5 win pushing the series to a 6th game after Toronto was down 0–3. Toronto would go on to lose to Philadelphia in six games despite Siakam's 24-point, 7-rebound, 7-assist and 3-steal outing in the 132–97 close-out loss in game 6. Siakam averaged 22.8 points, 7.8 rebounds and 5.8 assists in the 2022 playoffs. On 24 May, Siakam was named to the All-NBA Third Team earning his second All-NBA selection and his second in 3 seasons tying Vince Carter and Demar DeRozan with the most All-NBA selections in Raptors history with two.

==== 2022–23 season: Second All-Star selection ====
On 19 October 2022, Siakam posted 23 points, 11 rebounds and four steals in a 108–105 win against the Cleveland Cavaliers in the season-opener. On 21 October, Siakam recorded his fourth career triple-double with 37 points, 12 rebounds, and 11 assists in a 109–105 loss against the Brooklyn Nets. Siakam also became the first player with multiple 30-point triple-doubles in Raptors history. On 24 October, Siakam had 23 points, 9 rebounds, 6 assists, 2 steals, and 2 blocks and the go-ahead shot in a 98–90 win over the Miami Heat. On 26 October, Siakam recorded 20 points, 5 rebounds, and tied his career high with 13 assists in a 119–109 win over the Philadelphia 76ers. On 31 October, Siakam dropped 31 points, 12 rebounds, 6 assists, and 2 blocks in a 139–109 win over Atlanta Hawks getting "MVP" chants in the process, he tied Vince Carter with the most 30 points, 10 rebounds, and 5 assists games in Raptors history.

On 2 November, Siakam recorded his fifth career triple double with 22 points, 10 rebounds and 11 assists in a 143–100 blowout win over the San Antonio Spurs. On 21 December, Siakam scored a career-high 52 points in a 113–106 win over the New York Knicks. This was tied for the second-most points in a game by a Raptors player. On 26 December, Siakam was named Eastern Conference Player of the Week for Week 10 (19–25 December), averaging 38.7 points, 10.3 rebounds and 7.3 assists. Siakam initially became the first player in league history to miss out on the All-Star game while averaging 25 points, 8 rebounds and 6 assists per game . On 10 February 2023, Siakam was named an All-Star for the second time in his career as a reserve, replacing the injured Kevin Durant. On 2 April, Siakam logged 36 points, seven rebounds, seven assists and two steals in a 128–108 win over the Charlotte Hornets. Siakam posted career highs of 24.2 points and 5.8 assists per game on route to having his best season of his career. In the play-in tournament Siakam scored 32 points grabbed 9 rebounds and dished out 6 assists in a 109–105 loss to the Chicago Bulls.

==== 2023–24 season: Final season with Toronto ====
Siakam's offensive performance during the start of the season was labeled "sluggish". However, on 8 November 2023, he led the Raptors to a 127–116 victory against the Dallas Mavericks, recording 31 points and 12 rebounds. On 13 November, Siakam put up a season-high 39 points, along with 11 rebounds, seven assists, three steals and a game-winner in a 111–107 win over the Washington Wizards. On 22 November, he had 36 points and 10 rebounds in a 132–131 win against the Indiana Pacers. On 27 December, Siakam logged 22 points and 11 assists for a 132–102 win against the Wizards. On 30 December, Siakam scored 35 points, but the Raptors were unable to beat the Detroit Pistons, who defeated them 129–127. The Pistons critically gained three stops in a row against Siakam late in the fourth quarter which eventually translated to a nine-point lead. Despite cutting the lead to four through a three-pointer with 17 seconds left, the Pistons nonetheless came out with a victory to break their 28-game losing streak, tied for the longest in NBA history. By the time of his departure from the Raptors, Siakam was averaging 22.2 points, 6.3 rebounds and 4.9 assists through the season.

=== Indiana Pacers (2024–present) ===
==== 2023–24 season: Eastern Conference Finals appearance ====
On 17 January 2024, Siakam was traded to the Indiana Pacers in a three-team trade in exchange for Bruce Brown, Jordan Nwora, Kira Lewis Jr. and three first-round draft picks. Two days later, on 19 January, Siakam made his Pacers debut, putting up 21 points, six rebounds and three assists in a 118–115 loss against the Portland Trail Blazers. On 25 January, Siakam recorded his 6th career triple-double with 26 points, 13 rebounds and 10 assists in a 134–122 win over the Philadelphia 76ers. The next day, Siakam recorded 31 points, seven rebounds and two steals in a 133–131 win over the Phoenix Suns.

In game 1 of the Pacers' first-round playoffs series against the Milwaukee Bucks, Siakam posted a then playoff career-high 36 points and tied his playoff career high with 13 rebounds in a 109–94 loss. In game 2, Siakam scored a playoff career-high 37 points, along with 11 rebounds, 6 assists and zero turnovers in a 125–108 victory over the Milwaukee Bucks. The Pacers defeated the Knicks in 7 games to advance to the Eastern Conference Finals, the franchise's first since 2014. The Pacers eventually lost the series to the eventual NBA champion Celtics in four games.

==== 2024–25 season: Third All-Star selection and second finals appearance ====
On 8 July 2024, Siakam re-signed with the Pacers to a four-year, $189.5 million contract. On 30 October, Siakam scored 29 points and hit a game winner in a 135–132 overtime victory against the Boston Celtics in a playoff rematch. On January 29, 2025, Siakam scored a season-high 37 points on 15-of-21 shooting from the field in a 133–119 win over the Detroit Pistons. On 30 January, Siakam was named as reserve for the 2025 NBA All-Star Game, his third selection.

In game 2 of the Pacers' first-round playoffs series against the Milwaukee Bucks, Siakam recorded 24 points, 11 rebounds, three assists and three steals in a 123–115 win. On May 13, Siakam had 21 points, eight rebounds and five assists in a 114–105 closeout win over the Cleveland Cavaliers in game 5, helping lead the Indiana Pacers to their second consecutive Eastern Conference Finals. In game 2 of the Eastern Conference Finals, Siakam scored a playoff career-high 39 points on 15-of-21 shooting in a 114–109 win over the New York Knicks, as the Pacers took a 2–0 series lead. In game 4 of the series, Siakam delivered 30 points on 11-of-21 shooting as the Pacers took a 3–1 lead. Siakam recorded 31 points, five rebounds, three assists and three blocks in game 6 to help the Pacers reach a 125–108 victory over the Knicks, granting him his second visit to the NBA Finals and the first appearance for the Pacers since 2000. He was named the Eastern Conference finals MVP after averaging 24.8 points per game on 52.4% shooting from the field and 50% from three-point range. On 5 June, the first game of his second Finals, he led the Pacers by scoring 19 points in a 111–110 come-from-behind victory. The Pacers went on to lose to the Oklahoma City Thunder in seven games.

==== 2025–26 season: Fourth All-Star selection ====
Following Tyrese Haliburton’s injury absence, Siakam became the primary initiator and focal point of Indiana's offense. His usage rate and shot attempts increased noticeably, and he frequently operated as the team's go-to option in late-game situations. The Pacers relied on his ability to create scoring opportunities both in isolation and in transition, as well as his improved playmaking from the forward position. On December 5, 2025, Siakam scored a season-high 36 points and grabbed 10 rebounds to lead the Pacers in a 120–105 victory over the Chicago Bulls. On February 1, 2026, Siakam was named to his fourth All-Star Game in Los Angeles as an Eastern Conference reserve.

2026-27 season: (Present)

He is currently averaging 23.0 points, 6.1 rebounds, and 3.8 assists per game.

== Player profile ==
Entering the NBA as a developmental prospect, Siakam expanded his role to emerge as a versatile, two-way wing player capable of scoring and playmaking. His positional versatility was shown during the 2021–22 season, when he started games at both center and point guard, averaging a then-career-high 5.3 assists per game while regularly passing out of double-teams. Siakam is also considered one of the best defenders in the NBA. He is known for his ability to guard against multiple positions, from guard to center, and serves both as a rim protector and a perimeter defender. Additionally, Siakam has gained a reputation for his efficiency in transition play, being noted for being one of the best in the league.

== Awards and honors ==
NBA

- NBA champion: 2019
- 4× NBA All-Star: 2020, 2023, 2025, 2026
- 2× All-NBA Team selection:
  - All-NBA Second Team: 2020
  - All-NBA Third Team: 2022
- NBA Most Improved Player: 2019
- 2× NBA minutes played leader: 2022, 2023
- NBA Eastern Conference Finals MVP: 2025
- NBA D-League champion: 2017
- NBA D-League Finals MVP: 2017

College

- AP Honorable mention All-American (2016)
- WAC Player of the Year (2016)
- 2× First-team All-WAC (2015, 2016)
- WAC Freshman of the Year (2015)

== Career statistics ==
Legend
GP	Games played	GS	Games started	MPG	Minutes per game
FG%	Field goal percentage	3P%	3-point field goal percentage	FT%	Free throw percentage
RPG	Rebounds per game	APG	Assists per game	SPG	Steals per game
BPG	Blocks per game	PPG	Points per game	**Bold**	Career high
†	Won an NBA championship	*	Led the league

=== NBA ===
==== Regular season ====
Year	Team	GP	GS	MPG	FG%	3P%	FT%	RPG	APG	SPG	BPG	PPG
2016–17	Toronto	55	38	15.6	.502	.143	.688	3.4	.3	.5	.8	4.2
2017–18	Toronto	**81**	5	20.7	.508	.220	.621	4.5	2.0	.8	.5	7.3
2018–19†	Toronto	80	**79**	31.8	**.549**	.369	.785	6.9	3.1	.9	.7	16.9
2019–20	Toronto	60	60	35.2	.453	.359	.792	7.3	3.5	1.0	**.9**	22.9
2020–21	Toronto	56	56	35.8	.455	.297	**.827**	7.2	4.5	1.1	.7	21.4
2021–22	Toronto	68	68	**37.9***	.494	.344	.749	**8.5**	5.3	**1.3**	.6	22.8
2022–23	Toronto	71	71	37.4*	.480	.324	.774	7.8	**5.8**	.9	.5	**24.2**
2023–24	Toronto	39	39	34.7	.522	.317	.758	6.3	4.9	.8	.3	22.2
2023–24	Indiana	41	41	31.8	**.549**	.386	.699	7.8	3.7	.8	.4	21.3
2024–25	Indiana	78	78	32.7	.519	**.389**	.734	6.9	3.4	.9	.5	20.2
2025–26	Indiana	62	62	33.2	.484	.358	.693	6.6	3.8	1.1	.4	24.0
Career		691	597	31.4	.497	.342	.754	6.6	3.6	.9	.6	18.5
All-Star		4	2	15.3	.741	.000	.500	4.8	2.0	.8	.0	10.3

==== Playoffs ====
Year	Team	GP	GS	MPG	FG%	3P%	FT%	RPG	APG	SPG	BPG	PPG
2017	Toronto	2	0	5.0	.000	—	—	1.5	.5	.5	.0	.0
2018	Toronto	10	0	17.9	**.610**	**.750**	.650	3.6	.8	.1	.6	6.6
2019†	Toronto	**24***	**24***	37.1	.470	.279	.759	7.1	2.8	1.0	.7	19.0
2020	Toronto	11	11	38.0	.396	.189	.717	**7.5**	3.8	1.1	.4	17.0
2022	Toronto	6	6	**43.4**	.477	.235	**.861**	7.2	**5.8**	**1.2**	**1.0**	**22.8**
2024	Indiana	17	17	35.4	.541	.298	.619	**7.5**	3.8	.8	.4	21.6
2025	Indiana	23*	23*	33.5	.513	.427	.713	6.3	3.4	**1.2**	.7	20.5
Career		93	81	33.7	.490	.309	.719	6.6	3.2	.9	.6	18.1

=== College ===
Year	Team	GP	GS	MPG	FG%	3P%	FT%	RPG	APG	SPG	BPG	PPG
2014–15	New Mexico State	**34**	27	30.8	**.572**	.000	**.759**	7.7	1.3	.8	1.8	12.8
2015–16	New Mexico State	**34**	**34**	**34.6**	.539	**.200**	.678	**11.6**	**1.7**	**1.0**	**2.2**	**20.3**
Career		68	61	32.7	.551	.176	.711	9.7	1.5	.9	2.0	16.6

== Personal life ==
Siakam is the son of Tchamo Siakam, the former mayor of Makénéné, Cameroon, and Victorie Siakam. When his father died in a car crash in October 2014, Siakam was unable to attend the funeral because he was waiting for the issuance of a new U.S. visa. His three older brothers, Boris, Christian and James, all played NCAA Division I basketball in the United States—Boris at Western Kentucky, Christian at IUPUI, and James at Vanderbilt. Siakam goes by the nickname "Spicy P".

=== Partnerships ===
On 14 February 2023, Siakam and McDonald's Canada partnered on a limited edition McFlurry called the Siakam Swirl McFlurry. Inspired by Siakam's iconic spin move and the Raptors team colours, it is made with vanilla soft serve, hot fudge and crushed red Smarties. It was exclusive in Canada Siakam also partnered with the University of New Brunswick (UNB) to create the Pascal Siakam Scholarship, aimed towards providing funds for UNB students from Cameroon studying in technology-based programs. In September 2025, he received an honorary doctorate from UNB.

== See also ==
- List of NBA annual minutes played leaders
