= Trey McKinney-Jones =

American basketball player (born 1990)

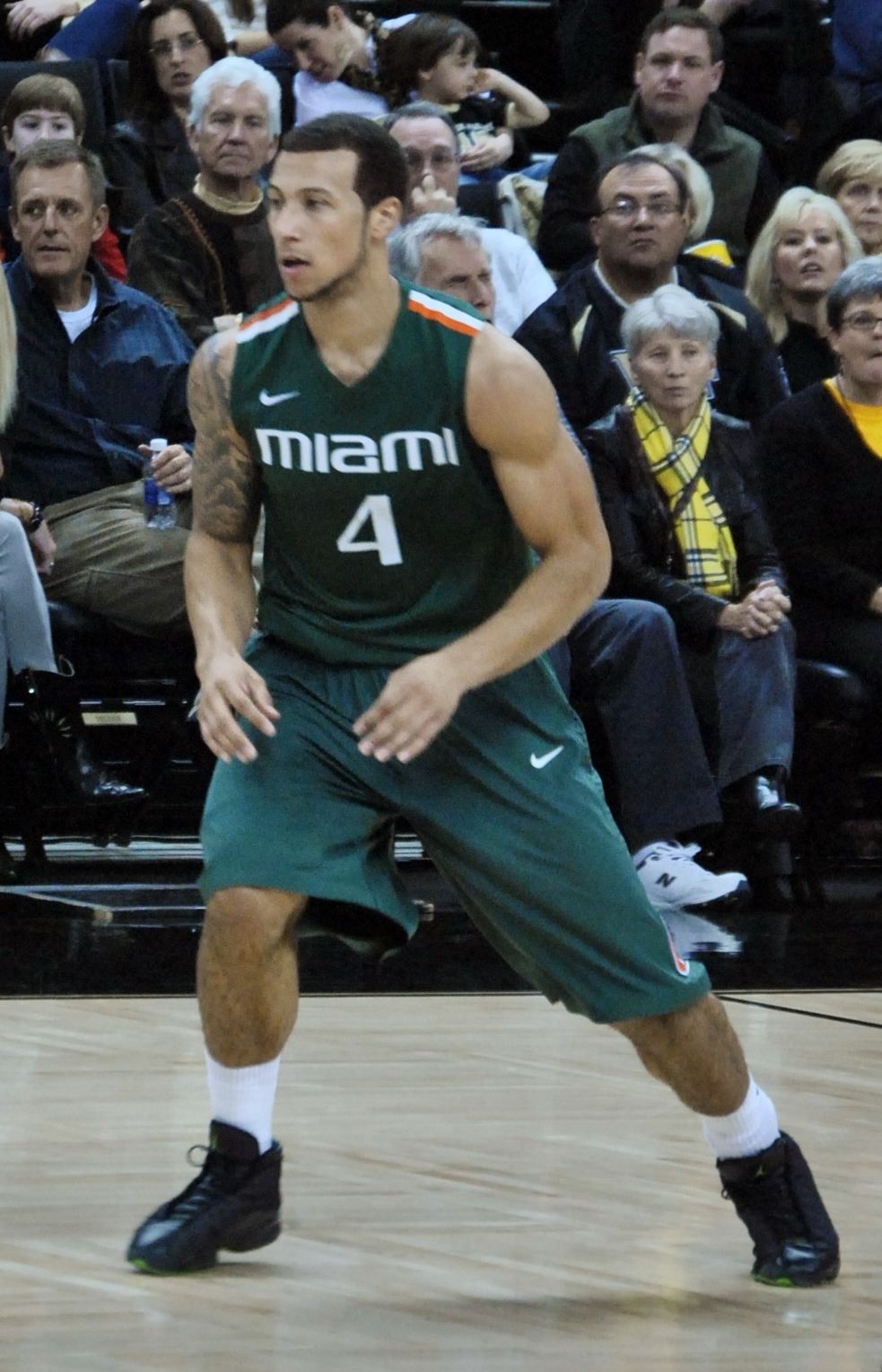
- McKinney–Jones with Miami in 2013

No. 4 – Gunma Crane Thunders
- Position: Shooting guard
- League: B.League

Personal information
- Born: August 27, 1990 (age 36) Milwaukee, Wisconsin, U.S.
- Listed height: 6 ft 5 in (1.96 m)
- Listed weight: 220 lb (100 kg)

Career information
- High school: South Milwaukee (South Milwaukee, Wisconsin)
- College: Kansas City (2008–2010); Miami (Florida) (2011–2013)
- NBA draft: 2013: undrafted
- Playing career: 2013–present

Career history
- 2013–2014: Fort Wayne Mad Ants
- 2014: BCM Gravelines
- 2015: Fort Wayne Mad Ants
- 2015: Maccabi Kiryat Gat
- 2016: Egis Körmend
- 2016–2018: Fort Wayne Mad Ants
- 2018: Indiana Pacers
- 2018: Fort Wayne Mad Ants
- 2018–2019: Chiba Jets Funabashi
- 2019–2020: Telekom Baskets Bonn
- 2020–present: Gunma Crane Thunders

Career highlights
- Hungarian Cup champion (2016); Liga Leumit champion (2015); NBA D-League champion (2014)
- Stats at NBA.com
- Stats at Basketball Reference

Trey McKinney-Jones (born August 27, 1990) is an American professional basketball player for Gunma Crane Thunders of the B.League. He played college basketball for the UMKC Kangaroos (now known as the Kansas City Roos) and the Miami Hurricanes.

== College career ==
McKinney-Jones played two seasons at UMKC, averaging 10.9 points and 3.8 rebounds in 28.5 minutes per game as a sophomore. In his sophomore year, his high flying dunk against Centenary was selected as the ESPN SportsCenter number one play of the day. He transferred to Miami and sat out the 2010–11 season as a redshirt. As a junior at Miami, he averaged 7.0 points, 3.5 rebounds, 1.4 assists and 0.7 steals in 24.1 minutes per game. In his senior year, McKinney-Jones posted averages of 9.2 points and 3.4 rebounds in 30.3 minutes per game. In the ACC tournament versus North Carolina, he broke the school record for most three-pointers in a tournament game with six.

== Professional career ==
=== Fort Wayne Mad Ants (2013–2014) ===
After going undrafted in the 2013 NBA draft, McKinney-Jones signed with the Milwaukee Bucks for training camp on September 30, 2013. He was later waived by the Bucks on October 26 after appearing in two preseason games. The following month, he was acquired by the Fort Wayne Mad Ants of the NBA Development League. As a rookie playing for the Mad Ants in 2013–14, McKinney-Jones averaged 14.8 points, 4.5 rebounds, 2.1 assists and 1.1 steals in 53 games, while helping the team win their maiden championship.

=== Gravelines (2014) ===
In July 2014, McKinney-Jones joined the Miami Heat for the Orlando Summer League and the San Antonio Spurs for the Las Vegas Summer League. On August 16, 2014, he signed with BCM Gravelines of France for the 2014–15 season. However, in late December, he parted ways with the Gravelines after appearing in 14 games.

=== Return to the Mad Ants (2015) ===
On February 20, 2015, he was reacquired by the Fort Wayne Mad Ants. He played out the season with the Mad Ants, and in 22 games, he averaged 11.4 points, 4.5 rebounds and 2.0 assists per game.

=== Maccabi Kiryat Gat (2015) ===
In July 2015, McKinney-Jones joined the Atlanta Hawks for the 2015 NBA Summer League. The following month, he signed with Maccabi Kiryat Gat of the Israeli Basketball Premier League.

=== Körmend (2016) ===
In January 2016, McKinney-Jones joined Hungarian club Egis Körmend. He was a guard on the 2015–2016 team which made it to the semifinals, falling 87–76 to Team 23. McKinney-Jones won the 2016 Hungarian Cup during his tenure with Körmend.

=== Third stint with the Mad Ants (2016–2018) ===
On October 31, 2016, McKinney-Jones was reacquired by the Fort Wayne Mad Ants of the NBA Development League.

On September 7, 2017, McKinney-Jones signed with the Indiana Pacers of the NBA, on a training camp deal. He was waived on October 14 as one of the team's final preseason roster cuts.

=== Indiana Pacers (2018) ===
On February 21, 2018, the Indiana Pacers signed McKinney-Jones to a 10-day contract. Two days later, he made his NBA debut for the Pacers in a 116–93 blowout win over the Atlanta Hawks.

=== Fourth stint with the Mad Ants (2018) ===
On March 3, 2018, McKinney-Jones was reacquired by the Fort Wayne Mad Ants of the NBA Development League, after his 10-day contract with the Indiana Pacers expired.

=== Chiba Jets Funabashi (2018–2019) ===
On September 5, 2018, McKinney-Jones was reported to have signed with Chiba Jets Funabashi of the B.League.

=== Telekom Baskets Bonn (2019–2020) ===
On August 15, 2019, he signed with Telekom Baskets Bonn of the Basketball Bundesliga (BBL).

=== Gunma Crane Thunders (2020–present) ===
On July 18, 2020, McKinney-Jones signed with Gunma Crane Thunders of the B.League. On June 15, 2021, he re-signed with Gunma Crane Thunders. On June 9, 2022, he re-signed with Gunma Crane Thunders. On June 20, 2023, he re-signed with Gunma Crane Thunders. On June 11, 2024, he re-signed with Gunma Crane Thunders.

== National team career ==
On June 25 McKinney-Jones was one of 12 players selected to compete in the last round of World Cup Qualifying.

== Career statistics ==
Legend
GP	Games played	GS	Games started	MPG	Minutes per game
FG%	Field goal percentage	3P%	3-point field goal percentage	FT%	Free throw percentage
RPG	Rebounds per game	APG	Assists per game	SPG	Steals per game
BPG	Blocks per game	PPG	Points per game	**Bold**	Career high

=== NBA ===
Year	Team	GP	GS	MPG	FG%	3P%	FT%	RPG	APG	SPG	BPG	PPG
2017–18	Indiana	1	0	1.0	—	—	—	.0	.0	.0	.0	.0
Career		1	0	1.0	—	—	—	.0	.0	.0	.0	.0

== Personal life ==
The son of Dwight Jones and Luann McKinney, Trey McKinney-Jones has three siblings: Laine, Mariel and Dwight. He graduated from the University of Miami in 2012 with a degree in marketing. His uncle, Mark Jones, played basketball professionally with the Orlando Magic. His aunt, Esther Jones, is a track star who won an Olympic gold medal in Barcelona 1992 as a member of the 4 x 100 metres relay.

== Honors ==
Fort Wayne Mad Ants

- NBA Development League: 2013–14

Egis Körmend

- Magyar Kupa: 2016
