= 2014–15 NBA Development League season =

- League: NBA Development League
- Sport: Basketball
- Duration: November – April

Draft
- Top draft pick: Robert Covington
- Picked by: Grand Rapids Drive

Regular season
- Top seed: Santa Cruz Warriors
- Season MVP: Tim Frazier (Maine Red Claws)

Finals
- Champions: Santa Cruz Warriors
- Runners-up: Fort Wayne Mad Ants
- Finals MVP: Elliot Williams

NBA Development League seasons
- ← 2013–14 2015–16 →

The 2014–15 NBA Development League season was the 14th season of the NBA Development League (NBA D-League). The NBA D-League is the official minor league basketball organization owned by the National Basketball Association (NBA). The NBA D-League expanded to a record 18 teams for the 2014–15 season. For the first time in league history the NBA D-League was aligned into two conferences with two divisions each, two with five and two with four.

One expansion team, the Westchester Knicks, joined the 17 teams from the previous season. The Springfield Armor relocated to Grand Rapids, and were renamed the Grand Rapids Drive, and the Tulsa 66ers relocated to Oklahoma City, and were renamed to Oklahoma City Blue.

== Teams ==
- Austin Spurs (affiliated with the San Antonio Spurs)
- Bakersfield Jam (affiliated with the Phoenix Suns)
- Canton Charge (affiliated with the Cleveland Cavaliers)
- Delaware 87ers (affiliated with the Philadelphia 76ers)
- Erie BayHawks (affiliated with the Orlando Magic)
- Fort Wayne Mad Ants (affiliated with 13 teams)
- Grand Rapids Drive (affiliated with the Detroit Pistons)
- Idaho Stampede (affiliated with the Utah Jazz)
- Iowa Energy (affiliated with the Memphis Grizzlies)
- Los Angeles D-Fenders (affiliated with the Los Angeles Lakers)
- Maine Red Claws (affiliated with the Boston Celtics)
- Oklahoma City Blue (affiliated with the Oklahoma City Thunder)
- Reno Bighorns (affiliated with the Sacramento Kings)
- Rio Grande Valley Vipers (affiliated with the Houston Rockets)
- Santa Cruz Warriors (affiliated with the Golden State Warriors)
- Sioux Falls Skyforce (affiliated with the Miami Heat)
- Texas Legends (affiliated with the Dallas Mavericks)
- Westchester Knicks (affiliated with the New York Knicks)

== Regular season ==
=== Eastern Conference ===
East Division

Team	W	L	PCT	GB	Home	Road
x- Maine Red Claws (1)	35	15	.700	–	20–6	15–9
x- Canton Charge (3)	31	19	.620	4.0	14–10	17–9
Erie BayHawks	24	26	.480	11.0	15–10	9–16
Delaware 87ers	20	30	.400	15.0	11–14	9–16
Westchester Knicks	10	40	.200	25.0	9–16	1–24

Central Division

Team	W	L	PCT	GB	Home	Road
x- Sioux Falls Skyforce (2)	29	21	.580	–	14–10	15–11
x- Fort Wayne Mad Ants (4)	28	22	.560	1.0	14–11	14–11
Iowa Energy	26	24	.520	3.0	13–12	13–12
Grand Rapids Drive	23	27	.460	6.0	15–9	8–18

=== Western Conference ===
Southwest Division

Team	W	L	PCT	GB	Home	Road
x- Austin Spurs (2)	32	18	.640	–	18–8	14–10
x- Oklahoma City Blue (4)	28	22	.560	4.0	16–9	12–13
Rio Grande Valley Vipers	27	23	.540	5.0	14–11	13–12
Texas Legends	22	28	.440	10.0	8-17	14–11

West Division

Team	W	L	PCT	GB	Home	Road
x- Santa Cruz Warriors (1)	35	15	.700	–	19-7	16–8
x- Bakersfield Jam (3)	34	16	.680	1.0	17–8	17–8
Reno Bighorns	20	30	.400	15.0	14–11	6–19
Los Angeles D-Fenders	17	33	.340	18.0	12–13	5–20
Idaho Stampede	9	41	.180	26.0	6–19	3–22

== Playoffs ==
The Santa Cruz Warriors won the D-League title, doing so in two games over the Fort Wayne Mad Ants, doing so with a win in Game 1 by a score of 119-115 and a win in Game 2 by a score of 109–96.

Quarterfinals (April 8–15)
E1	Maine*	0
E4	Fort Wayne	2
E2	Sioux Falls*	1
E3	Canton	2
W1	Santa Cruz*	2
W4	Oklahoma City	0
W2	Austin*	2
W3	Bakersfield	1

Semifinals (April 17–21)
E4	Fort Wayne	2
E3	Canton	0
W1	Santa Cruz	2
W2	Austin	1

Finals (April 23 & April 26)
E4	Fort Wayne	0
W1	Santa Cruz	2

=== Finals ===
April 23, 2015
8:00 p.m. ET

Boxscore

Santa Cruz Warriors 119, Fort Wayne Mad Ants 115
Pts: Elliot Williams 31; Rebs: Ognjen Kuzmic 13; Asts: Elliot Williams 8	Pts: Ramon Harris 30; Rebs: CJ Fair 7 Asts: Jordan Crawford 11

Allen County War Memorial Coliseum, Fort Wayne, Indiana
Attendance: 3,318
Referees:
- #22 Tyler Ford
- #26 Brett Nansel
- #39 CJ Washington

April 26, 2015
7:00 p.m. ET

Boxscore

Fort Wayne Mad Ants 96, Santa Cruz Warriors 109
Scoring by quarter: 27–28, 25–31, 19–23, 25–27
Pts: Jordan Crawford 17; Rebs: Trey McKinney Jones 8 Asts: Matt Bouldin 6	Pts: Elliot Williams 23; Rebs: Darington Hobson, Taylor Griffin 11; Asts: Darington Hobson 7
Santa Cruz wins series, 2–0

Kaiser Permanente Arena, Santa Cruz, California
Attendance: 2,600
Referees:
- #30 Mitchell Ervin
- #54 Jason Goldenberg
- #68 Gediminis Petraitis

== Awards and honors ==
- NBA Development League Most Valuable Player Award: Tim Frazier, Maine Red Claws
- Dennis Johnson Coach of the Year Award: Scott Morrison, Maine Red Claws
- NBA Development League Rookie of the Year Award: Tim Frazier, Maine Red Claws
- NBA Development League Defensive Player of the Year Award: Aaron Craft, Santa Cruz Warriors
- NBA Development League Impact Player of the Year Award: Jerel McNeal, Bakersfield Jam
- NBA Development League Most Improved Player Award: Joe Jackson, Bakersfield Jam
- Executive of the Year: Tim Salier, Austin Spurs
- Jason Collier Sportsmanship Award: Renaldo Major, Bakersfield Jam
- Development Champion Award: Fort Wayne Mad Ants
- All-Star Game MVP: Andre Emmett, Fort Wayne Mad Ants
- All-NBA Development League Team:

First team

- Jerrelle Benimon, Idaho Stampede
- Seth Curry, Erie BayHawks
- Earl Barron, Bakersfield Jam
- Tim Frazier, Maine Red Claws
- Willie Reed, Grand Rapids Drive

Second team

- Chris Babb, Maine Red Claws
- Bryce Cotton, Austin Spurs
- James Michael McAdoo, Santa Cruz Warriors
- Arinze Onuaku, Canton Charge
- Elliot Williams, Santa Cruz Warriors

Third team

- Jabari Brown, Los Angeles D-Fenders
- Eric Griffin, Texas Legends
- Jerel McNeal, Bakersfield Jam
- Adonis Thomas, Grand Rapids Drive
- Damien Wilkins, Iowa Energy
