= 2016–17 NBA Development League season =

- League: NBA Development League
- Sport: Basketball
- Duration: November 11, 2016 – April 1, 2017

Draft
- Top draft pick: Anthony Brown
- Picked by: Erie BayHawks

Regular season
- Top seed: Raptors 905
- Season MVP: Vander Blue (Los Angeles D-Fenders)

Finals
- Champions: Raptors 905
- Runners-up: Rio Grande Valley Vipers
- Finals MVP: Pascal Siakam (Raptors 905)

NBA Development League seasons
- ← 2015–16 2017–18 →

The 2016–17 NBA Development League season was the 16th season of the NBA Development League (NBA D-League). The NBA D-League is the official minor league basketball organization owned by the National Basketball Association (NBA). The following season, the league was rebranded to NBA G League as part of multi-year partnership with Gatorade and its parent company, PepsiCo.

== Transactions ==
=== Retirement ===
- On July 4, 2015, Blake Ahearn was named the head coach of Clayton High School's boys basketball team, effectively ending his playing career. Ahearn played for 6 NBA D-League teams during his 8-year playing career, winning one championship with the Santa Cruz Warriors in 2015.

== League changes ==
The league expanded to a record 22 teams for the 2016–17 season. Three expansion teams were introduced this season (Greensboro Swarm, Long Island Nets, and Windy City Bulls), each of them owned and affiliated with an NBA team. Along with these three new teams, the Bakersfield Jam were purchased by their 2015–16 affiliate, the Phoenix Suns, and relocated to become the Northern Arizona Suns. The Idaho Stampede, who were already owned by the Utah Jazz, were also relocated and became the Salt Lake City Stars. The Reno Bighorns were purchased by their NBA affiliate, the Sacramento Kings just prior to the start of the season. The addition of the three teams, as well as the purchases of existing teams, left just eight NBA teams without a D-League affiliate and only seven D-League teams not owned by an NBA team.

The league consists of two conferences, each with 11 teams split into two divisions, two with six and two with five. The Greensboro Swarm and Long Island Nets were placed into the Atlantic Division. The Raptors 905 moved from the Atlantic Division, along with the newly formed Windy City Bulls, to the Central Division. With the addition of the three expansion teams, to even out the conferences, the Iowa Energy and Sioux Falls Skyforce moved from the Central Division of the Eastern Conference to the Southwest Division of the Western Conference.

== Regular season ==
Final standings.

=== Eastern Conference ===
Atlantic Division

Team (affiliate)	W	L	PCT	GB	Home	Road
y – Maine Red Claws (BOS)	29	21	.580	0	15–10	14–11
Delaware 87ers (PHI)	26	24	.520	3	15–10	11–14
Westchester Knicks (NYK)	19	31	.380	10	12–13	7–18
Greensboro Swarm (CHA)	19	31	.380	10	13–12	6–19
Long Island Nets (BKN)	17	33	.340	12	10–15	7–18
Erie BayHawks (ORL)	14	36	.280	15	9–16	5–20

Central Division

Team (affiliate)	W	L	PCT	GB	Home	Road
z – Raptors 905 (TOR)	39	11	.780	0	18–7	21–4
x – Fort Wayne Mad Ants (IND)	30	20	.600	9	16–9	14–11
x – Canton Charge (CLE)	29	21	.580	10	17–8	12–13
Grand Rapids Drive (DET)	26	24	.520	13	15–10	11–14
Windy City Bulls (CHI)	23	27	.460	16	15–10	8–17

=== Western Conference ===
Southwest Division

Team (affiliate)	W	L	PCT	GB	Home	Road
y – Oklahoma City Blue (OKC)	34	16	.680	0	19–6	15–10
x – Rio Grande Valley Vipers (HOU)	32	18	.640	2	19–6	13–12
Sioux Falls Skyforce (MIA)	29	21	.580	5	16–9	13–12
Austin Spurs (SAS)	25	25	.500	9	13–12	12–13
Texas Legends (DAL)	25	25	.500	9	14–11	11–14
Iowa Energy (MEM)	12	38	.240	22	6–19	6–19

Pacific Division

Team (affiliate)	W	L	PCT	GB	Home	Road
y – Los Angeles D-Fenders (LAL)	34	16	.680	0	16–9	18–7
x – Santa Cruz Warriors (GSW)	31	19	.620	3	18–7	13–12
Northern Arizona Suns (PHX)	22	28	.440	12	14–11	8–17
Reno Bighorns (SAC)	21	29	.420	13	12–13	9–16
Salt Lake City Stars (UTA)	14	36	.280	20	7–18	7–18

== Playoffs ==
For the last time, the League held an eight-team bracket for the postseason. After the season, the League would shift from best-of-three postseason rounds to having it only be for the Finals (while retaining the arrangement of having the better seeded team host Game 2 and Game 3 if necessary). Raptors 905 won the Finals in the final year of the league with the D League branding, winning over the Rio Grande Valley Vipers in three games. The Vipers won Game 1 119–106 before Raptors 905 won Game 2 95-85 and Game 3 122–96.

Conference Semifinals (April 5-April 12); Best of 3
E1	Raptors 905	2
E4	Canton Charge	0
Eastern Conference
E2	Maine Red Claws	2
E3	Fort Wayne Mad Ants	1
W1	Oklahoma City Blue	2
W4	Santa Cruz Warriors	1
Western Conference
W2	Los Angeles D-Fenders	1
W3	Rio Grande Valley Vipers	2

Conference Finals (April 13-April 20); Best of 3
E1	Raptors 905	2
E2	Maine Red Claws	0
W1	Oklahoma City Blue	1
W3	Rio Grande Valley Vipers	2

Finals (April 23, 25, 27); Best of 3
E1	Raptors 905	2
W3	Rio Grande Valley Vipers	1

=== Finals boxscore ===
April 23, 2017
8:00 p.m. ET

Boxscore

Raptors 905 106, Rio Grande Valley Vipers 119
Scoring by quarter: 31–29, 20–26, 31–38, 24–26
Pts: CJ Leslie 25; Rebs: Pascal Siakam 10; Asts: John Jordan 8	Pts: Darius Morris 23; Rebs: Chinanu Onuaku, Joshua Smith 10; Asts: Darius Morris 11

McAllen Convention Center, McAllen, Texas
Attendance: 1,969
Referees:
- #45 Ray Acosta
- #54 Jason Goldenberg
- #70 Aaron Smith

April 25, 2017
7:00 p.m. ET

Boxscore

Rio Grande Valley Vipers 85, Raptors 905 95
Scoring by quarter: 22–23, 23–31, 22–18, 19–23
Pts: Kyle Wiltjer 25; Rebs: Kyle Wiltjer 12; Asts: Darius Morris 7	Pts: Pascal Siakam 32; Rebs: Pascal Siakam 10; Asts: Fred VanVleet 9

Hershey Centre, Mississauga, Ontario
Attendance: 3,359
Referees:
- #14 JB DeRosa
- #23 Jacyn Goble
- #48 Vladimir Voyard-Tadal

April 27, 2017
7:00 p.m. ET

Boxscore

Rio Grande Valley Vipers 96, Raptors 905 122
Pts: Troy Williams 23; Rebs: Chris Walker 9 Asts: Jarvis Threatt 7	Pts: Bruno Caboclo 31; Rebs: Bruno Caboclo, Yanick Moreira 11; Asts: Fred VanVleet 14
Raptors 905 wins series, 2–1

Hershey Centre, Mississauga, Ontario
Attendance: 4,824
Referees:
- #26 Brett Nansel
- #39 CJ Washington
- #46 Jonathan Sterling
