= Noblesville Boom =

American professional basketball team of the NBA G League

- Conference: Eastern
- League: NBA G League
- Founded: 2007
- History: Fort Wayne Mad Ants; 2007–2023; Indiana Mad Ants; 2023–2025; Noblesville Boom; 2025–present
- Arena: Riverview Health Arena at Innovation Mile
- Location: Noblesville, Indiana
- Team colors: Navy, gold, cyan, white
- General manager: Chris Taylor
- Head coach: Bryce Taylor
- Ownership: Pacers Sports and Entertainment (PS&E)
- Affiliation: Indiana Pacers
- Championships: 1 (2014)
- Conference titles: 2 (2014, 2015)
- Division titles: 2 (2014, 2018)
- Showcase titles: 0
- Retired numbers: 2 (17, 19)
- Website: www.noblesvilleboom.com

The Noblesville Boom are an American professional basketball team in the NBA G League based in Noblesville, Indiana. They are affiliated with the Indiana Pacers, and play their home games at Riverview Health Arena at Innovation Mile. In September 2015, Pacers Sports & Entertainment (PS&E), parent company of the Indiana Pacers, purchased the franchise.

From 2007 to 2023, the team played in Fort Wayne at Allen County War Memorial Coliseum and was known as the Fort Wayne Mad Ants. From 2023 to 2025, the team played in Indianapolis at Gainbridge Fieldhouse and was known as the Indiana Mad Ants. Beginning in 2025, the team currently plays in Noblesville at Riverview Health Arena at Innovation Mile and are known as the Noblesville Boom. Since the team's inception, the franchise has accumulated one finals championship (2014), two conference titles (2014, 2015), two division titles (2014, 2018), a finals loss in the Showcase Cup (2023), and has retired two jersey numbers (17, 19).

During the 2013–14 season, the franchise won their first and only championship after obtaining the 1st seed in the playoffs with a league-best 34–16 record. The Mad Ants swept the Santa Cruz Warriors in the franchise's first finals appearance, becoming the third team to ever go undefeated in the playoffs. During the 2014–15 season, the franchise returned to the finals in a rematch the year prior; however, the Mad Ants were swept by the Santa Cruz Warriors. In the 2023–24 season, the Mad Ants earned a 15–2 record, and the 1st seed in the 2023 Showcase Cup, before losing in the finals to the Westchester Knicks 107–99. Notable franchise alumni include Ron Howard, Walker Russell Jr., Tony Mitchell, Dahntay Jones, Khris Middleton, Miles Plumlee, Tyler Hansbrough, Georges Niang, Hasheem Thabeet, Stephan Hicks, David Stockton, Elfrid Payton, Oscar Tshiebwe, Jahlil Okafor, and Cody Martin.

== Team history ==
=== 2007–2023: Fort Wayne Mad Ants ===
In April 2007, the NBA Development League (D-League) announced it was expanding to Fort Wayne for the 2007–08 season, with former AT&T president John Zeglis as the team's president and part owner. The team was poised to be the first minor league basketball franchise to play in Fort Wayne since the Fort Wayne Fury were disbanded after the folding of the Continental Basketball Association in 2001. The franchise held a team-naming contest on their website where fans could vote on one of the four finalists: Lightning, Fire, Coyotes and Mad Ants, the latter name being a tribute to the city's namesake "Mad" Anthony Wayne.

==== 2007–08 season: Inaugural season ====
At the team's inception, the Fort Wayne Mad Ants were affiliated with the Detroit Pistons and Indiana Pacers, while debuting their maroon, gold and black colors. During the 2007 NBA D-League Draft, the Mad Ants notably selected Ron Howard, Larry Turner and Lukasz Obrzut. They finished the 2007–08 season, their first in the D-League, with a 17–33 record that put them in last place in the Central Division. Jeremy Richardson was selected to the 2008 All-Star Game, and was awarded the 2008 All-Star Game MVP Award. Their inaugural season also included players Dahntay Jones, Walker Russell Jr., Sammy Mejía and Earl Calloway.

==== 2008–12 seasons: Early years ====
The Mad Ants added the Milwaukee Bucks as their third affiliate for the 2008–09 season, ending the year with a 19–31 record. The franchise posted three more sub-.500 records in the next three years, in 2009–10, 2010–11 and 2011–12, failing to make the playoffs in their first five years of competition. Across these seasons, the franchise had numerous players selected to the All-Star Game: Chris Hunter (2009), Ron Howard & Rob Kurz (2010), Walker Russell Jr. (2009, 2011, 2012) and Darnell Lazare (2012). Chris Hunter (2009) and Rob Kurz (2010) were selected to the All-NBA D-League Second Team. The franchise also featured players Alex Acker, Oliver Lafayette, Joe Alexander, Larry Sanders, Chris Kramer, Marvin Phillips, Corey Allmond, Vernon Macklin, Stephen Graham and Travis Walton.

==== 2012–13 season: First playoff appearance ====
The Mad Ants added the Charlotte Bobcats as their fourth NBA affiliate before in the 2012–13 season. In the 2012 D-League Draft, the Mad Ants selected JaJuan Johnson first overall. This season saw assignments from NBA players Khris Middleton, Miles Plumlee, Orlando Johnson, Kim English and Luke Harangody. Tony Mitchell earned 2013 Rookie of the Year, 2013 Slam Dunk Champion, 2013 All-NBA D-League First Team, and 2013 All-NBA D-League Rookie Team. They made the D-League playoffs for the first time in 2013, losing to the Santa Cruz Warriors in the quarterfinals after a 27–23 regular season.

==== 2013–14 season: Finals championship ====
The next year, in the 2013–14 season, the Mad Ants won their division and conference with a 34–16 record and made it to the 2014 D-League Finals for the first time after beating the Sioux Falls Skyforce in the semifinals and the Reno Bighorns in the quarterfinals. The Mad Ants defeated the Santa Cruz Warriors in two games in the Finals to claim their first D-League title, becoming the third team to go undefeated in the playoffs (6–0). The finals runner-up Warriors roster included both Seth Curry and Mychel Thompson, emulating their respective brothers Stephen Curry and Klay Thompson on the Golden State Warriors known as the Splash Brothers. In back-to-back seasons, Tony Mitchell won the 2014 Slam Dunk Contest while being selected 2014 All-NBA D-League Third Team. Solomon Hill, Adreian Payne and Sadiel Rojas all appeared for the Mad Ants this year. Ron Howard won back-to-back Sportsmanship Awards in 2013 and 2014, before his D-League retirement, finishing top 5 in most points scored in D-League history with 4,325 career points.

==== 2014–15 season: Finals loss ====
In 2014, as most NBA teams began exclusively partnering with or acquiring their own D-League teams, the Mad Ants made affiliate partnerships with the rest of the teams that did not have exclusive affiliates: the Atlanta Hawks, the Chicago Bulls, the Brooklyn Nets, the Denver Nuggets, the Los Angeles Clippers, the Minnesota Timberwolves, the New Orleans Pelicans, the Portland Trail Blazers, the Toronto Raptors and the Washington Wizards. This put the Mad Ants' total number of NBA affiliates at 14 for the 2014–15 season. As a result, the Mad Ants earned the 2015 NBA D-League Development Champion Award for developing players such as Jordan Crawford, Noah Vonleh, Mike Muscala, Russ Smith, John Jenkins, Bruno Caboclo, Glen Rice Jr. and C.J. Wilcox. The Mad Ants reached the D-League Finals again in 2015, but lost the championship series to the Santa Cruz Warriors in two games.

==== 2015–16 season: Pacers ownership ====
By 2015, the Mad Ants were the only remaining independently owned team in the D-League, as the rest were owned and operated by an NBA team or a common parent organization. However, in September 2015, Pacers Sports & Entertainment (PS&E) purchased the Mad Ants from owner and president John Zeglis and made the team the Indiana Pacers' one-to-one D-League affiliate, dropping the rest of the Mad Ants' partnerships. Brian Levy was named general manager by PS&E. The team acquired Walter Lemon Jr. and Stephan Hicks in the 2015 D-League Draft before the 2015–16 season. The team missed the playoffs, finishing with a 20–30 record. Rakeem Christmas was selected to the 2016 All-Star Game. Glenn Robinson III, Joe Young, Shayne Whittington and Terran Petteway also made appearances this season.

==== 2016–17 season: Return to playoffs ====
During the 2016–17 season, the franchise qualified for the playoffs with a 30–20 record, losing in three games to the Maine Red Claws in the semifinals. Alex Poythress was selected to the 2017 All-NBA D-League Second Team and All-NBA D-League Rookie Team. Tyler Hansbrough, Georges Niang, Marquis Teague, John Lucas III, Christian Watford and Jarrod Uthoff all made appearances for the Mad Ants during this season.

==== 2017–18 season: Division title & rebrand ====
Before the 2017–18 season, the Mad Ants rebranded and changed their colors to match the Pacers: navy blue, gold, cool gray and white. The NBA Development League was rebranded as the NBA G League this season following a sponsorship deal with Gatorade and the NBA. They finished the season 29–21, winning the Central Division, and qualifying for the playoffs where they lost in the semifinals to the Erie BayHawks. DeQuan Jones earned the 2018 Most Improved Player Award and won the 2018 Slam Dunk Contest. Walter Lemon Jr. also earned 2018 All-NBA G League Third Team honors. Edmond Sumner, T. J. Leaf, Ike Anigbogu and Ben Moore all debuted for the Mad Ants this year.

==== 2018–19 season ====
The Mad Ants compiled a 23–27 record in the 2018–19 season, failing to make the playoffs. Alize Johnson and Davon Reed both played for the team this season.

==== 2019–20 season: Cancelled season ====
The next year, the Mad Ants held a 21–22 record before the 2019–20 season was cancelled due to the COVID-19 pandemic. Hasheem Thabeet, Goga Bitadze, JaKarr Sampson, Naz Mitrou-Long and Brian Bowen II all played during the cancelled season.

==== 2020–21 season: League-shortened year ====
The Mad Ants spent the 2020–21 season at the G League single site in Orlando, Florida during the COVID-19 pandemic, posting a 6–9 record, missing the playoffs. The Mad Ants selected Oshae Brissett 21st overall in the 2021 NBA G League Draft and later earned 2021 All-NBA G League Second Team. Cassius Stanley, Jalen Lecque and Amida Brimah all suited up for the Mad Ants during the shortened season.

==== 2021–22 season ====
For the 2021–22 season, the franchise returned to their home court at the Allen County War Memorial Coliseum on November 6, 2021, playing their first home game in the venue in 608 days against the Windy City Bulls. This game also marked the start of the Mad Ants' 15th Anniversary season. The Mad Ants missed the playoffs with a 17–17 record. Justin Anderson was named to the 2022 All-NBA G League First Team. Terry Taylor, Duane Washington Jr., Keifer Sykes and Andrew Rowsey also played for Fort Wayne this season.

==== 2022–23 season ====
During the 2022–23 season, the team's last in Fort Wayne, the Mad Ants returned to the playoffs with an 18–14 record, losing in the quarterfinals to Capital City Go-Go. Trevelin Queen and Gabe York were both selected to the 2023 Next Up Game while Justin Anderson was appointed 2023 All-NBA G League Third Team. Other players this season included Chris Duarte, Isaiah Jackson, David Stockton, Pedro Bradshaw and Norvel Pelle.

=== 2023–2025: Indiana Mad Ants ===
On May 8, 2023, the Indiana Pacers announced that they were moving the Mad Ants to Indianapolis in preparation for construction of the Noblesville Event Center, a new 3,400-seat venue, in Noblesville, Indiana. Upon their move to Indianapolis, the Mad Ants rebranded as the Indiana Mad Ants. The name was meant to last until their move to Noblesville, which would be accompanied by a new name, color scheme and mascot.

==== 2023–24 season ====
During the 2023–24 season, their first season playing at Gainbridge Fieldhouse, the Mad Ants finished with a 21–13 regular-season record, claiming the 3rd seed in the playoffs where they were defeated by the Delaware Blue Coats. They also earned a 15–2 record and the 1st seed in the 2023 Showcase Cup, though they ultimately lost in the finals to the Westchester Knicks. Oscar Tshiebwe was selected 2024 Rookie of the Year, 2024 All-NBA G League First Team, as well as 2024 All-NBA G League Rookie Team, after leading the league in rebounding and set a new G League single-season rebounding record with 16.2 rebounds per game. Elfrid Payton was selected 2024 All-NBA G League Third Team after leading the league in assists at 9.1 per game. Furthermore, Tshiebwe, Isaiah Wong and Kyle Mangas were all selected to the 2024 Next Up Game, while Tshiebwe participated in the 2024 NBA Rising Stars Challenge at All-Star Weekend. Stephan Hicks was named the inaugural winner of the "Ron Howard Mr. Mad Ant Award." This season also featured Jarace Walker, Ben Sheppard, Quenton Jackson, Jordan Bell, Kendall Brown and Mojave King.

==== 2024–25 season ====
Before the 2024–25 season, the NBA's G League Ignite folded, resulting in David Stockton's player defer rights being transferred back to the Mad Ants. On September 26, 2024, Stockton's returning player rights were traded to the Valley Suns expansion team in exchange for the returning player rights of Jahlil Okafor and Garrison Brooks from the 2024 Expansion Draft. On October 3, 2024, as a result of Elfrid Payton signing a training camp deal with the New Orleans Pelicans, the Mad Ants traded him to the Birmingham Squadron for the rights to Landers Nolley II. The Mad Ants earned a 7–9 record during the 2024 Winter Showcase, failing to make the Tip-Off Tournament playoffs. Jahlil Okafor was selected to the 2024 All Showcase team. Furthermore, Okafor and Keisei Tominaga were both selected to the 2025 Up Next Game while RayJ Dennis was selected 2025 All-Rookie Team. On March 6, 2025, the Mad Ants acquired Boogie Ellis from the Stockton Kings in a three-team trade, sending Kyle Mangas to the Austin Spurs. On March 24, 2025, the Mad Ants officially retired number 17 in honor of Stephan Hicks before a game against the Windy City Bulls who retired following the season. The Mad Ants finished the regular season with a 20–14 record, claiming the 4th seed in the playoffs, where they defeated the Greensboro Swarm 120–110 in the quarterfinals before losing the semifinals 129–114 to the Osceola Magic. Additional players who joined the Mad Ants for their final season in Indianapolis included Johnny Furphy, Tristen Newton, Enrique Freeman and Dakota Mathias.

=== 2025–present: Noblesville Boom ===
On April 16, 2025, the franchise officially rebranded as the Noblesville Boom, adopting a navy, cyan, gold and white color scheme with a new mascot debuting at Riverview Health Arena at Innovation Mile. The rebranded name is a tribute to the iconic, "Boom, Baby!" phrase tied to the Pacers and made famous 50 years ago by legendary Pacers coach and commentator Bobby "Slick" Leonard, while also reflecting the loud, fast-paced style the team brings to the court as well as the energy and growth of the Noblesville community. The name of the mascot for the Boom, Bobby the Bobcat, is also a tribute to Leonard. The name further complements the Pacers mascot, Boomer. On November 4, 2025, the Boom held their first scrimmage where the new mascot for the team, Bobby the Bobcat, was unveiled.

==== 2025–26 season ====
On June 23, 2025, the franchise sent Cameron McGriff to the Salt Lake City Stars in exchange for Jaedon LeDee and a first-round pick in the 2025 draft. On August 1, the Boom acquired Gabe McGlothan from the Grand Rapids Gold in a three-team deal sending Pedro Bradshaw to the Salt Lake City Stars. On August 29, the Boom acquired Jalen Slawson from the Osceola Magic in exchange for the player rights to Garrison Brooks. On October 2, the franchise acquired Ray Spalding from the Rio Grande Valley Vipers in exchange for the Boom's 2026 first-round draft pick. On October 3, the Boom acquired DaJuan Gordon from the South Bay Lakers in exchange for the Boom's 2025 and 2026 second-round draft picks and the Boom's first-round pick in the 2026 NBA G League International Draft. Their first season in Noblesville, the Boom earned a 5–9 record during the 2025 Winter Showcase, failing to make the Tip-Off Tournament playoffs. During the 2025–26 season, the Boom finished with a 16–20 record failing to make the playoffs. Ethan Thompson was selected to the 2026 NBA G League Next Up Game and Three-Point Contest while Gabe McGlothan was selected to the 2026 NBA G League Dunk Contest. Other notable players this season included Cody Martin, Kam Jones, Taelon Peter, Kyle Guy, Keion Brooks Jr. and MJ Iraldi.

==== 2026–27 season ====
Before the start of the 2026–27 season, the Boom acquired Braden Smith, Kobe Brown and Yuki Kawamura. On June 1, 2026, Bryce Taylor was named the new head coach of the Boom.

== Season-by-season results ==
Franchise Season Overviews
Season / Year	League / Association	Division / Conference	Regular season				Postseason results
Season / Year	League / Association	Division / Conference	Finish	Wins	Losses	Win%	Postseason results
Fort Wayne Mad Ants
2007–08	D-League	Central	4th	17	33	.340	Did not qualify
2008–09	D-League	Central	5th	19	31	.380	Did not qualify
2009–10	D-League	Eastern	5th	22	28	.440	Did not qualify
2010–11	D-League	Eastern	3rd	24	26	.480	Did not qualify
2011–12	D-League	Eastern	8th	14	36	.280	Did not qualify
2012–13	D-League	Eastern	2nd	27	23	.540	Lost Quarterfinal (Santa Cruz) 0–2
2013–14	D-League	Eastern	1st	34	16	.680	Won Quarterfinal (Reno) 2–0; Won Semifinal (Sioux Falls) 2–0; Won Championship (Santa Cruz) 2–0
2014–15	D-League	Central	2nd	28	22	.560	Won Quarterfinal (Maine) 2–0; Won Semifinal (Canton) 2–0; Lost Championship (Santa Cruz) 0–2
2015–16	D-League	Central	5th	20	30	.400	Did not qualify
2016–17	D-League	Central	2nd	30	20	.600	Lost Semifinal (Maine) 1–2
Fort Wayne Mad Ants
2017–18	G League	Central	1st	29	21	.580	Lost Semifinal (Erie) 116–119
2018–19	G League	Central	3rd	23	27	.460	Did not qualify
2019–20	G League	Central	4th	21	22	.488	Season cancelled
2020–21	G League	N/A	13th	6	9	.400	Did not qualify
2021–22	G League	Eastern	9th	17	17	.500	Did not qualify
2022–23	G League	Eastern	6th	18	14	.563	Lost Quarterfinal (Capital City) 87–101
Indiana Mad Ants
2023–24	G League	Eastern	3rd	21	13	.618	Lost Quarterfinal (Delaware) 101–123
2024–25	G League	Eastern	4th	20	14	.588	Won Quarterfinal (Greensboro) 120–110; Lost Semifinal (Osceola) 114–129
Noblesville Boom
2025–26	G League	Eastern	10th	16	20	.444	Did not qualify
Regular-season record				416	422	.496	2007–present
Playoff record				12	10	.545	2007–present

=== Tip-Off Tournament ===
Season	Division	Finish	Wins	Losses	Win%	Showcase Cup playoffs	Consolation rounds
Fort Wayne Mad Ants
2019	Central	-	6	10	.375	Did not qualify	Won Consolation (Northern Arizona) 99–94; Won Consolation (Rio Grande Valley) 117–105
2020	Tournament cancelled						
2021	Central	3rd	8	4	.667	Lost Quarterfinal (Delaware) 101–126	Won Consolation (Wisconsin) 155–103
2022	Central	1st	10	6	.667	Did not qualify	Won Consolation (Santa Cruz) 134–96; Won Consolation (Oklahoma City) 132–131
Indiana Mad Ants
2023	Central	1st	13	1	.929	Won Quarterfinal (Capital City) 113–102; Won Semifinal (College Park) 106–104; Lost Championship (Westchester) 99–107	Made Showcase Cup playoffs
2024	Central	6th	5	9	.357	Did not qualify	Won Consolation (Rio Grande Valley) 127–115; Won Consolation (Texas) 115–109
Noblesville Boom
2025	Central	7th	5	9	.357	Did not qualify	TBD
Tip-Off Tournament			47	39	.547	2019–present	
Showcase Cup playoffs			2	2	.500	2019–present	
Consolation rounds			7	0	1.000	2019–present	
Totals			56	41	.577	2019–present	

== Players ==
=== Current roster ===
Noblesville Boom roster
Players

Pos.	No.	Player	Height	Weight	DOB	From
F	0	Keion Brooks Jr.	6 ft 7 in (2.01 m)	210 lb (95 kg)	2000-08-07	Washington
F	24	Kobe Brown (TW)	6 ft 7 in (2.01 m)	250 lb (113 kg)	2000-01-01	Missouri
F	33	Omar El-Sheikh	6 ft 8 in (2.03 m)	218 lb (99 kg)	1998-05-14	Arkansas State
F	12	MJ Iraldi	6 ft 6 in (1.98 m)	190 lb (86 kg)	2001-08-31	Nova Southeastern
C	35	Samson Johnson	6 ft 10 in (2.08 m)	224 lb (102 kg)	2002-07-28	Connecticut
F	1	Cody Martin	6 ft 6 in (1.98 m)	205 lb (93 kg)	1995-09-28	Nevada
F	–	Isaih Moore	6 ft 10 in (2.08 m)	197 lb (89 kg)	2000-08-30	Fresno State
F	18	Jalen Slawson (TW)	6 ft 7 in (2.01 m)	215 lb (98 kg)	1999-10-22	Furman
G	–	Braden Smith (TW)	5 ft 10 in (1.78 m)	170 lb (77 kg)	2003-07-25	Purdue
G	5	Au'Diese Toney	6 ft 6 in (1.98 m)	205 lb (93 kg)	1999-11-12	Arkansas

Coaches
Head coach
- Bryce Taylor
Assistant(s)
- Rob Dosier
- Justin Wetzel

Legend
- (DP) Unsigned draft pick
- (FA) Free agent
- (S) Suspended
- (P) Prospects
- (NBA) On assignment from NBA affiliate
- (TW) Two-way affiliate player
- Injured

Roster
Updated: March 5, 2026

=== Retired numbers ===
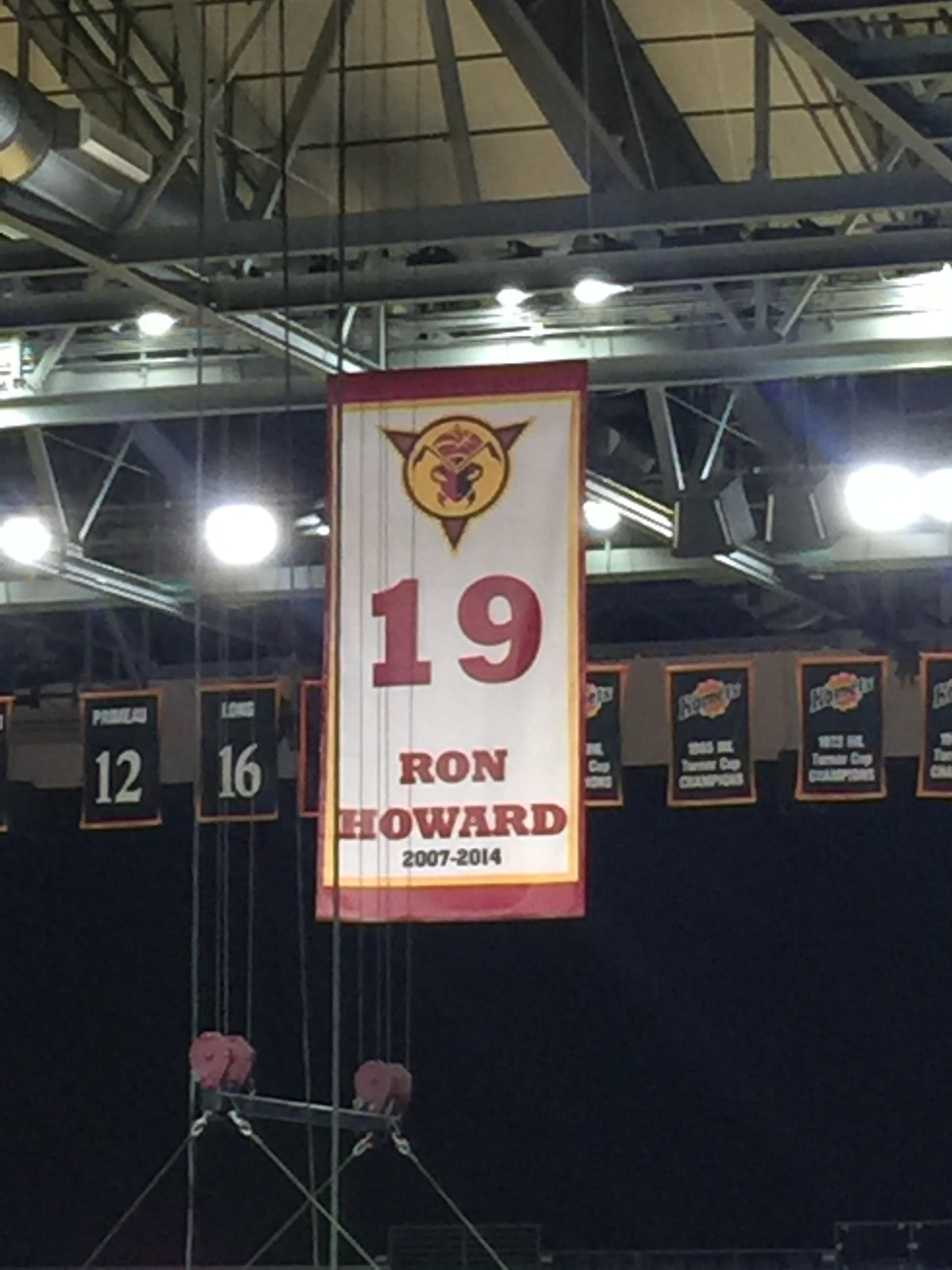
Ron Howard's No. 19 jersey hanging in the rafters at Fort Wayne's Memorial Coliseum.

Fort Wayne Mad Ants retired numbers
No.	Player	Position	Tenure	Date
19	Ron Howard	G/F	2007–2014	March 3, 2017
Indiana Mad Ants retired numbers
No.	Player	Position	Tenure	Date
17	Stephan Hicks	F/G	2015–2025	March 24, 2025
Noblesville Boom retired numbers
No.	Player	Position	Tenure	Date
TBD	TBD	TBD	TBD	TBD

== Head coaches ==
Overview of franchise head coaches
Head coach	Term	Regular season				Playoffs				Achievements
Head coach	Term	G	W	L	Win%	G	W	L	Win%	Achievements
Fort Wayne Mad Ants (2007–2017)
Kent Davison	2007–2008	49	17	32	.347	—	—	—	—	
Jaren Jackson	2008–2009	50	19	31	.380	—	—	—	—	
Joey Meyer	2009–2012	115	51	64	.443	—	—	—	—	
Steve Gansey	2012 (interim)	35	9	26	.257	—	—	—	—	
Duane Ticknor	2012–2013	50	27	23	.540	2	0	2	.000	1× playoffs (2013)
Conner Henry	2013–2015	100	62	38	.620	12	10	2	.833	Coach of the Year (2013–14); Won Finals Championship (2014); Lost Finals Championship (2015)
Fort Wayne / Indiana Mad Ants (2017–2025)
Steve Gansey	2015–2020	243	123	120	.506	4	1	3	.250	2× playoffs (2017, 2018)
Tom Hankins	2020–2026	115	82	67	.550	4	1	3	.250	Next Up Game Coach (2023–24); Lost Showcase Championship (2023); 3× playoffs (2023, 2024, 2025)
Noblesville Boom (2025–present)
Bryce Taylor	2026–present	-	-	-	–	-	-	-	–	

== NBA affiliates ==
Current

- Indiana Pacers (2007–present)

Former

- Detroit Pistons (2007–2015)
- Milwaukee Bucks (2008–2015)
- Charlotte Bobcats/Hornets (2012–2015)
- Atlanta Hawks (2014–2015)
- Brooklyn Nets (2014–2015)
- Chicago Bulls (2014–2015)
- Denver Nuggets (2014–2015)
- Los Angeles Clippers (2014–2015)
- Minnesota Timberwolves (2014–2015)
- New Orleans Pelicans (2014–2015)
- Portland Trail Blazers (2014–2015)
- Toronto Raptors (2014–2015)
- Washington Wizards (2014–2015)

== Mr. Mad Ant Award ==
Established in 2023–24, the award honors Ron Howard and will be "presented to an active player at the end of the regular season."

Ron Howard - Mr. Mad Ant Award winners
No.	Player	Position	Tenure	Season
17	Stephan Hicks	G/F	2015–2025	2023–2024
TBD	TBD	TBD	TBD	2024–2025
TBD	TBD	TBD	TBD	2025–2026

== Individual awards ==
NBA G League Most Valuable Player

- Ron Howard – 2014

NBA G League Coach of the Year

- Conner Henry – 2014

NBA G League Rookie of the Year

- Oscar Tshiebwe – 2024
- Tony Mitchell – 2013

NBA G League Most Improved Player

- DeQuan Jones – 2018

NBA G League Team Executive of the Year

- Jeff Potter – 2014

Jason Collier Sportsmanship Award

- Ron Howard – 2013, 2014

NBA D League Development champion

- Fort Wayne Mad Ants – 2015

All-NBA G League First Team

- Oscar Tshiebwe – 2024
- Justin Anderson – 2022
- Ron Howard – 2014
- Tony Mitchell – 2013

All-NBA G League Second Team

- Oshae Brissett – 2021
- Alex Poythress – 2017
- Rob Kurz – 2010
- Chris Hunter – 2009

All-NBA G League Third Team

- Elfrid Payton – 2024
- Justin Anderson – 2023
- Walter Lemon Jr. – 2018
- Tony Mitchell – 2014

All-NBA G League Defensive Team

- Jalen Slawson – 2026
- Sadiel Rojas – 2013, 2014

All-NBA G League Rookie Team

- RayJ Dennis – 2025
- Oscar Tshiebwe – 2024
- Alex Poythress – 2017
- C.J. Fair – 2015
- Trey McKinney Jones – 2014
- Tony Mitchell – 2013
- Cameron Jones – 2012

All-Showcase Team

- Jahlil Okafor – 2024
- Jarace Walker – 2023
- Terry Taylor – 2022
- Alize Johnson – 2019

NBA G League Up Next Game

- Ethan Thompson – 2026
- Jahlil Okafor – 2025
- Keisei Tominaga – 2025
- Oscar Tshiebwe – 2024
- Isaiah Wong – 2024
- Kyle Mangas – 2024
- Trevelin Queen – 2023
- Gabe York – 2023

NBA G League Up Next Game Coach

- Tom Hankins – 2024
- Bryce Taylor – 2024
- Justin Wetzel – 2024
- Rob Dosier – 2024

NBA Rising Stars Challenge

- Oscar Tshiebwe – 2024

NBA G League United

- Keisei Tominaga – 2024

NBA G League International Challenge

- Edmond Sumner – 2019
- Trey McKinney Jones – 2018
- Walter Lemon Jr. – 2018

NBA D League All-Star Game Most Valuable Player

- Andre Emmett – 2015
- Jeremy Richardson – 2008

NBA D-League All-Star Game

- Alex Poythress – 2017
- Rakeem Christmas – 2016
- Andre Emmett – 2015
- Ron Howard – 2010, 2013, 2014
- Tony Mitchell – 2013
- Darnell Lazare – 2012
- Walker Russell – 2009, 2011, 2012
- Rob Kurz – 2010
- Chris Hunter – 2009
- Jeremy Richardson – 2008

NBA D-League Slam Dunk Champion

- DeQuan Jones – 2018
- Tony Mitchell – 2013, 2014

NBA D League Shooting Stars Champion

- Cameron Jones – 2012

== Home arena, mascot & colorway ==
Franchise overviews
Years	Arena	Location	Mascot	Colors
2007–2017	Allen County War Memorial Coliseum	Fort Wayne, IN	The Mad Ant	
2017–2020	Allen County War Memorial Coliseum	Fort Wayne, IN	The Mad Ant	
2020–2021	ESPN Wide World of Sports Complex	Bay Lake, FL	The Mad Ant	
2021–2023	Allen County War Memorial Coliseum	Fort Wayne, IN	The Mad Ant	
2023–2025	Gainbridge Fieldhouse	Indianapolis, IN	The Mad Ant	
2025–present	Riverview Health Arena at Innovation Mile	Noblesville, IN	Bobby the Bobcat	

== Rivalries ==
Franchise rivalries
Year	Round	Scores	Winner
Santa Cruz Warriors
2013	Quarterfinal	124–118 Warriors; 110–92 Warriors	Warriors win 2–0
2014	Finals championship	102–92 Mad Ants; 119–113 Mad Ants	Mad Ants win 2–0
2015	Finals championship	119–115 Warriors; 109–96 Warriors	Warriors win 2–0
Maine Red Claws / Celtics
2015	Quarterfinal	104–103 Mad Ants; 121–111 Mad Ants	Mad Ants win 2–0
2017	Semifinal	110–106 Red Claws; 111–110 Mad Ants; 124–119 Red Claws	Red Claws win 2–1
Westchester Knicks
2023	Showcase Cup	107–99 Knicks	Knicks win 1–0

== In popular culture ==
- In the television series One Tree Hill, James Lafferty's character Nathan receives an offer to coach the Mad Ants in the episode "You've Dug Your Own Grave, Now Lie In It". The episode originally aired September 29, 2008 on The CW Network.
- The Mad Ants developed an external team called the "Ants Alumni" who competed in The Basketball Tournament's 2015 season, against 96 national teams for the $1 million prize money. The team included 2014 D-League champion Mad Ants, as they won the Midwest Regional Final in Chicago, Illinois, making it to the Final Four semifinals in New York City, losing to Team 23.
- The Mad Ants were featured in the 'MyCareer' mode in NBA 2K19, a basketball game released on September 11, 2018, developed by Visual Concepts, and published by 2K Sports.
- The Mad Ants were featured in the "Destination NBA: A G League Odyssey" feature-length documentary which originally premiered August 8, 2023 on Prime Video.
- The Boom were featured in the "NBA G League Chronicles" feature-length documentary which originally premiered March 25, 2026 on YouTube sponsored by Gatorade. The documentary included Boom player Kyle Guy as well as Shareef Abdur-Rahim, Victor Oladipo, Gorgui Dieng, Harrison Ingram and Jasmin Brown.

== See also ==
- History of sports in Fort Wayne, Indiana
