= NBA G League Defensive Player of the Year Award =

The NBA G League Defensive Player of the Year is an annual NBA G League award given since the league's inaugural season to the best defensive player of the regular season. The league's head coaches determine the award by voting and it is usually presented to the honoree during the D-League playoffs.

Through the 2020–21 season, three players have been named the Defensive Player of the Year more than once: Derrick Zimmerman (2005, 2006), Stefhon Hannah (2012, 2013) and DeAndre Liggins (2014, 2016). Six international players have been named recipients: Stéphane Lasme (Gabon), Mouhamed Sene (Senegal), Walter Tavares (Cape Verde), Landry Nnoko (Cameroon), Chris Boucher (Canada), and Christ Koumadje (Chad). Jeff Myers was the inaugural winner while playing for the Greenville Groove.

== Winners ==
†	Denotes a tie for the Defensive Player of the Year Award

Season	Player	Position	Nationality	Team
2001–02	Jeff Myers	Guard	United States	Greenville Groove
2002–03	Mikki Moore	Center	United States	Roanoke Dazzle
2003–04	Karim Shabazz	Center	United States	Charleston Lowgators
2004–05	Derrick Zimmerman	Guard	United States	Columbus Riverdragons
2005–06	Derrick Zimmerman (2)	Guard	United States	Austin Toros
2006–07	Renaldo Major	Forward	United States	Dakota Wizards (1)
2007–08^{†}	Stéphane Lasme	Forward	Gabon	Los Angeles D-Fenders
2007–08^{†}	Mouhamed Sene	Center	Senegal	Idaho Stampede (1)
2008–09	Brent Petway	Forward	United States	Idaho Stampede (2)
2009–10	Greg Stiemsma	Center	United States	Sioux Falls Skyforce (1)
2010–11	Chris Johnson	Center	United States	Dakota Wizards (2)
2011–12	Stefhon Hannah	Guard	United States	Dakota Wizards (3)
2012–13	Stefhon Hannah (2)	Guard	United States	Santa Cruz Warriors (1)
2013–14	DeAndre Liggins	Guard	United States	Sioux Falls Skyforce (2)
2014–15	Aaron Craft	Guard	United States	Santa Cruz Warriors (2)
2015–16	DeAndre Liggins (2)	Guard	United States	Sioux Falls Skyforce (3)
2016–17	Edy Tavares	Center	Cape Verde	Raptors 905 (1)
2017–18	Landry Nnoko	Center	Cameroon	Grand Rapids Drive
2018–19	Chris Boucher	Forward	Canada	Raptors 905 (2)
2019–20	Christ Koumadje	Center	Chad	Delaware Blue Coats (1)
2020–21	Gary Payton II	Guard	United States	Raptors 905 (3)
2021–22	Shaquille Harrison	Guard	United States	Delaware Blue Coats (2)
2022–23	Jay Huff	Center	United States	Capital City Go-Go
2023–24	Shaquille Harrison (2)	Guard	United States	South Bay Lakers
2024–25	Braxton Key	Forward	United States	Santa Cruz Warriors
2025–26	Jamarion Sharp	Center	United States	Texas Legends

== Multiple-time winners ==
Awards	Player	Team(s)	Years
2	Derrick Zimmerman	Columbus Riverdragons (1) / Austin Toros (1)	2004–05, 2005–06
2	Stefhon Hannah	Dakota Wizards (1) / Santa Cruz Warriors (1)	2011–12, 2012–13
2	DeAndre Liggins	Sioux Falls Skyforce	2013–14, 2015–16
2	Shaquille Harrison	Delaware Blue Coats (1) / South Bay Lakers (1)	2021–22, 2023–24

== See also ==
- NBA Defensive Player of the Year Award
