= List of NBA G League yearly standings =

These are regular season standings and playoff results for the NBA G League. The NBA G League is the official minor league basketball organization owned and run by the National Basketball Association (NBA). The league was formed in 2001 as the National Basketball Development League (NBDL). The league was renamed to NBA Development League (NBA D-League) in 2005 to reflect its close affiliation with the NBA. In 2017, it was renamed NBA G League, as part of a sponsorship deal with Gatorade.

== 2001–02 ==
| Team | W | L | Win % | GB |
|---|---|---|---|---|
| North Charleston Lowgators | 36 | 20 | .643 | — |
| Greenville Groove | 36 | 20 | .643 | — |
| Columbus Riverdragons | 31 | 25 | .554 | 5 |
| Mobile Revelers | 30 | 26 | .536 | 6 |
| Huntsville Flight | 26 | 30 | .464 | 10 |
| Asheville Altitude | 26 | 30 | .464 | 10 |
| Fayetteville Patriots | 21 | 35 | .375 | 15 |
| Roanoke Dazzle | 18 | 38 | .321 | 18 |

Semifinals (Best-of-3)
2 | Greenville | 2
3 | Columbus | 1
1 | North Charleston | 2
4 | Mobile | 1

NBDL Championship (Best-of-3)
2 | Greenville | 2
1 | North Charleston | 0

Finals

- April 8: Greenville 81, North Charleston 63
- April 10: Greenville 76, North Charleston 68

=== Finals ===
April 8, 2002
7:00 p.m. ET

Boxscore

North Charleston Lowgators 63, Greenville Groove 81
Scoring by quarter: 19–22, 17–21, 19–21, 8–17
| Pts: Sedric Webber 15; Rebs: Neil Edwards, Nate Green, Galen Young, Sedric Webber 5 each Asts: Galen Young 4 | Pts: Billy Thomas 20; Rebs: Kimani Ffriend 10; Asts: Jeff Myers 7 |

Bi-Lo Center, Greenville, South Carolina
Attendance: 2,172
Referees:
- #23 Anthony Jordan
- #28 Ed Malloy
- #31 Mike Nance

April 10, 2002
7:00 p.m. ET

Boxscore

Greenville Groove 76, North Charleston Lowgators 68
Scoring by quarter: 19–22, 14–19, 18–12, 25–15
| Pts: Billy Thomas 28; Rebs: Rahim Lockhart 8 Asts: Jeff Myers 7 | Pts: Galen Young 12; Rebs: Neil Edwards 10; Asts: BJ McKie 10 |
Greenville wins series, 2–0

North Charleston Coliseum, North Charleston, South Carolina
Attendance: 1,765
Referees:
- #12 Tony Brown
- #37 Troy Raymond
- #39 Eli Roe

== 2002–03 ==
| Team | W | L | Win % | GB |
|---|---|---|---|---|
| Fayetteville Patriots | 32 | 18 | .640 | — |
| North Charleston Lowgators | 26 | 24 | .520 | 6 |
| Mobile Revelers | 26 | 24 | .520 | 6 |
| Roanoke Dazzle | 26 | 24 | .520 | 6 |
| Asheville Altitude | 23 | 27 | .460 | 9 |
| Columbus Riverdragons | 23 | 27 | .460 | 9 |
| Greenville Groove | 22 | 28 | .440 | 10 |
| Huntsville Flight | 22 | 28 | .440 | 10 |

Semifinals (Best-of-3)
1 | Fayetteville | 2
4 | Roanoke | 0
3 | Mobile | 2
2 | North Charleston | 0

NBDL Championship (Best-of-3)
3 | Mobile | 2
1 | Fayetteville | 1

Finals

- April 4: Mobile 92, Fayetteville 82
- April 9: Fayetteville 77, Mobile 71
- April 11: Mobile 75, Fayetteville 72

=== Finals ===
April 4, 2003
7:30 p.m. ET

Boxscore

Mobile Revelers 92, Fayetteville Patriots 82
Scoring by quarter: 27–15, 25–24, 18–18, 22–25
| Pts: Cedric Henderson 21; Rebs: Derek Hood 8 Asts: Cedric Henderson 6 | Pts: Terrell McIntyre 29; Rebs: Jeff Aubry 15; Asts: Omar Cook 7 |

Crown Coliseum, Fayetteville, North Carolina
Attendance: 2,163
Referees:
- #10 Matt Boland
- #41 Jeff Smith
- #45 Zach Zarba

April 9, 2003
8:00 p.m. ET

Boxscore

Fayetteville Patriots 77, Mobile Revelers 71
Scoring by quarter: 24–18, 16–16, 23–13, 14–24
| Pts: Terrell McIntyre 19; Rebs: Bryan Lucas 8 Asts: Terrell McIntyre 8 | Pts: Cedric Henderson 17; Rebs: Derek Hood 15; Asts: Larry Reid 4 |

Mobile Civic Center, Mobile, Alabama
Attendance: 1,888
Referees:
- #35 Olandis Poole
- #37 Troy Raymond
- #39 Eli Roe

April 11, 2003
7:30 p.m. ET

Boxscore

Mobile Revelers 75, Fayetteville Patriots 72
Scoring by quarter: 15–13, 16–19, 20–25, 24–15
| Pts: Isaac Fontaine 19; Rebs: Derek Hood 8 Asts: Larry Reid 3 | Pts: Terrell McIntyre 16; Rebs: Jameel Watkins 8 Asts: Omar Cook 5 |

Crown Coliseum, Fayetteville, North Carolina
Attendance: 4,313
Referees:
- #37 Troy Raymond
- #39 Eli Roe
- #45 Zach Zarba

== 2003–04 ==
| Team | W | L | Win % | GB |
|---|---|---|---|---|
| Asheville Altitude | 28 | 18 | .609 | — |
| Charleston Lowgators | 27 | 19 | .587 | 1 |
| Huntsville Flight | 24 | 22 | .522 | 4 |
| Fayetteville Patriots | 21 | 25 | .457 | 7 |
| Roanoke Dazzle | 20 | 26 | .435 | 8 |
| Columbus Riverdragons | 18 | 28 | .391 | 10 |

Semifinals
1 | Asheville | 116
4 | Fayetteville | 111
3 | Huntsville | 108
2 | Charleston | 100

NBDL Championship
1 | Asheville | 108
3 | Huntsville (OT) | 106

=== Finals boxscore ===
April 24, 2004
7:15 p.m. ET

Boxscore

Huntsville Flight 106, Asheville Altitude 108 (OT)
Scoring by quarter: 37–21, 19–27, 18–21, 23–28, Overtime: 9–11
| Pts: Mateen Cleaves 26; Rebs: Rodney Bias 10; Asts: Mateen Cleaves 6 | Pts: Brandon Kurtz 26; Rebs: Brandon Kurtz 14; Asts: Lavor Postell, Brandin Knight 4 each |

Asheville Civic Center, Asheville, North Carolina
Attendance: 3,891
Referees:
- #19 David Guthrie
- #26 Eric Lewis
- #35 Olandis Poole

== 2004–05 ==
| Team | W | L | Win % | GB |
|---|---|---|---|---|
| Columbus Riverdragons | 30 | 18 | .625 | — |
| Asheville Altitude | 27 | 21 | .563 | 3 |
| Huntsville Flight | 27 | 21 | .563 | 3 |
| Roanoke Dazzle | 26 | 22 | .542 | 4 |
| Fayetteville Patriots | 17 | 31 | .354 | 13 |
| Florida Flame | 17 | 31 | .354 | 13 |

Semifinals
1 | Columbus | 96
4 | Roanoke | 89
2 | Asheville | 90
3 | Huntsville | 86

NBDL Championship
2 | Asheville | 90
1 | Columbus | 67

=== Finals boxscore ===
April 23, 2005
7:00 p.m. ET

Boxscore

Asheville Altitude 90, Columbus Riverdragons 67
Scoring by quarter: 18–21, 25–14, 18–22, 29–10
| Pts: Ron Slay, Lenny Stokes 19; Rebs: Tim Bowers, Ron Slay 10 each Asts: Tim Bowers 4 | Pts: Derrick Zimmerman 16; Rebs: Ramel Curry, Neil Yanke 8 each Asts: Derrick Zimmerman 8 |

Columbus Civic Center, Columbus, Georgia
Attendance: 5,156
Referees:
- #19 David Guthrie
- #44 Sean Wright
- #30 Curtis Blair

== 2005–06 ==
| Team | W | L | Win % | GB |
|---|---|---|---|---|
| Fort Worth Flyers | 28 | 20 | .583 | — |
| Albuquerque Thunderbirds | 26 | 22 | .542 | 2 |
| Florida Flame | 25 | 23 | .521 | 3 |
| Roanoke Dazzle | 25 | 23 | .521 | 3 |
| Arkansas RimRockers | 24 | 24 | .500 | 4 |
| Austin Toros | 24 | 24 | .500 | 4 |
| Tulsa 66ers | 24 | 24 | .500 | 4 |
| Fayetteville Patriots | 16 | 32 | .333 | 12 |

Semifinals
2 | Albuquerque | 80
3 | Florida | 71
1 | Fort Worth | 87
4 | Roanoke | 78

D-League Championship
2 | Albuquerque | 119
1 | Fort Worth | 108

=== Finals boxscore ===
April 22, 2006
7:00 p.m. CT

Boxscore

Albuquerque Thunderbirds 119, Fort Worth Flyers 108
Scoring by quarter: 28–21, 30–25, 29–28, 32–34
| Pts: Tierre Brown, Andreas Glyniadakis 21 each Rebs: Tierre Brown 10; Asts: T. J. Cummings, Brandon Robinson 6 each | Pts: Keith Langford 39; Rebs: Keith Langford 7 Asts: Keith Langford, Aaron Miles 6 each |

Fort Worth Convention Center, Fort Worth, Texas
Attendance: 3,518
Referees:
- #66 Brian Forte
- #72 Haywoode Workman
- #27 Mark Lindsay

== 2006–07 ==
=== Regular season ===
==== Eastern Division ====
| Team | W | L | PCT | GB | Home | Road |
|---|---|---|---|---|---|---|
| **x**-Dakota Wizards (1) | 33 | 17 | .660 | – | 19–6 | 14–11 |
| **x**-Sioux Falls Skyforce (2) | 30 | 20 | .600 | 3 | 17–8 | 13–12 |
| **x**-Fort Worth Flyers (3) | 29 | 21 | .580 | 4 | 18–7 | 11–14 |
| Tulsa 66ers | 21 | 29 | .420 | 12 | 12–13 | 9–14 |
| Austin Toros | 21 | 29 | .420 | 12 | 11–14 | 10–15 |
| Arkansas RimRockers | 16 | 34 | .320 | 17 | 11–14 | 5–20 |

==== Western Division ====
| Team | W | L | PCT | GB | Home | Road |
|---|---|---|---|---|---|---|
| **x**-Idaho Stampede (1) | 33 | 17 | .660 | – | 16–9 | 17–8 |
| **x**-Colorado 14ers (2) | 28 | 22 | .560 | 5 | 16–9 | 12–13 |
| **x**-Albuquerque Thunderbirds (3) | 24 | 26 | .480 | 9 | 14–11 | 10–15 |
| Los Angeles D-Fenders | 23 | 27 | .460 | 10 | 13–12 | 10–15 |
| Anaheim Arsenal | 23 | 27 | .460 | 10 | 11–14 | 12–13 |
| Bakersfield Jam | 19 | 31 | .380 | 14 | 12–13 | 7–18 |

Notes

- **x** indicates a team that had qualified for the playoffs
- Number in parentheses indicates the team's seeding for the playoffs.

=== Playoffs ===
Three teams with the best regular season records in each division qualified for playoffs. The playoffs consist of three rounds with single elimination format. Teams with the better regular season record holds home-court advantage in the first and second rounds, while teams with higher seed holds home-court advantage in the Finals. The division winners received a bye from the first round. The remaining teams faced each other in the first round.

First round (April 17–18)
2 | **Sioux Falls** | **128**
3 | Fort Worth | 105
Eastern Division
2 | **Colorado** | **130**
3 | Albuquerque | 100

Second round (April 20–21)
1 | **Dakota** | **115**
2 | Sioux Falls | 113
1 | Idaho | 91
2 | **Colorado** | **94***

D-League Championship (April 29)
E1 | **Dakota** | **129***
W2 | Colorado | 121

Notes

- The numbers to the left of each team indicate the team's seeding.
- An asterisk (*) denotes overtime period(s).
- Teams in **bold** advanced to the next round.
- Teams in italics have home-court advantage in that round.

=== Finals ===
April 29, 2007
6:00 p.m. CT

Recap
Box Score

Colorado 14ers 121, **Dakota Wizards** **129** (OT)
Scoring by quarter: 33–25, 23–39, 24–22, 29–23, Overtime: 12–20
| Pts: Eugene Jeter 30; Rebs: Elton Brown 12; Asts: Eugene Jeter 8 | Pts: Darius Rice 52; Rebs: Maurice Baker 10; Asts: Chris McCray 7 |

Bismarck Civic Center, Bismarck, North Dakota
Attendance: 5,224
Referees:
- #48 Brian Forte
- #18 John Goble
- #30 Blair

== 2007–08 ==
=== Regular season ===
==== Central Division ====
| Team | W | L | PCT | GB | Home | Road |
|---|---|---|---|---|---|---|
| **x**-Dakota Wizards (3) | 29 | 21 | .580 | – | 18–7 | 11–14 |
| **x**-Sioux Falls Skyforce (6) | 28 | 22 | .560 | 1 | 19–6 | 9–16 |
| Iowa Energy | 22 | 28 | .440 | 7 | 13–12 | 9–16 |
| Fort Wayne Mad Ants | 17 | 33 | .340 | 12 | 12–13 | 5–20 |

==== Southwest Division ====
| Team | W | L | PCT | GB | Home | Road |
|---|---|---|---|---|---|---|
| **x**-Austin Toros (2) | 30 | 20 | .600 | – | 19–6 | 11–14 |
| **x**-Colorado 14ers (5) | 29 | 21 | .580 | 1 | 17–8 | 12–13 |
| Tulsa 66ers | 26 | 24 | .520 | 4 | 14–11 | 12–13 |
| Albuquerque Thunderbirds | 22 | 28 | .440 | 8 | 14–11 | 8–17 |
| Rio Grande Valley Vipers | 21 | 29 | .420 | 9 | 16–9 | 5–20 |

==== Western Division ====
| Team | W | L | PCT | GB | Home | Road |
|---|---|---|---|---|---|---|
| **x**-Idaho Stampede (1) | 36 | 14 | .720 | – | 21–4 | 15–10 |
| **x**-Los Angeles D-Fenders (4) | 32 | 18 | .640 | 4 | 19–6 | 13–12 |
| Utah Flash | 24 | 26 | .480 | 12 | 14–11 | 10–15 |
| Anaheim Arsenal | 23 | 27 | .460 | 13 | 14–11 | 9–16 |
| Bakersfield Jam | 11 | 39 | .220 | 25 | 9–16 | 2–23 |

Notes

- **x** indicates a team that had qualified for the playoffs
- Number in parentheses indicates the team's seeding for the playoffs.

=== Playoffs ===
The three division winners, along with the next three teams with the best regular season records regardless of division, qualified for the playoffs. The playoffs consist of three rounds with single elimination format for the first two rounds and best-of-three format for the finals. Teams with the better regular season record holds home-court advantage in every rounds. The three division winners were seeded from 1 to 3 based on their regular season records, while the remaining teams were seeded from 4 to 6 based on their regular season records. The two division winners with the best regular season records received a bye from the first round. The remaining division winners faced the lowest seeded teams, while the two remaining teams faced each other.

First round (April 15)
4 | **Los Angeles** | **102**
5 | Colorado | 95
3 | Dakota* | 89
6 | **Sioux Falls** | **101**

Second round (April 19–20)
1 | **Idaho*** | **97**
4 | Los Angeles | 90
2 | **Austin*** | **99**
6 | Sioux Falls | 93

D-League Championship (April 21–25)
1 | **Idaho*** | **2**
2 | Austin* | 1

Notes

- The numbers to the left of each team indicate the team's seeding.
- The numbers to the right indicate the number of games the team won in that round.
- The division winners are marked by an asterisk (*).
- Teams in **bold** advanced to the next round.
- Teams in italics have home-court advantage in that round.

=== Finals ===
April 21, 2008
8:00 p.m. ET

Recap
Boxscore

Idaho Stampede 89, **Austin Toros** **95**
Scoring by quarter: 26–14, 18–28, 17–26, 28–27
| Pts: Cory Violette 20; Rebs: Cory Violette 14; Asts: Randy Livingston 9 | Pts: Justin Bowen 25; Rebs: Darvin Ham 13; Asts: Andre Barrett 7 |

Austin Convention Center, Austin, Texas
Attendance: 2,299
Referees:
- #56 Haywoode Workman
- #15 Eric Dalen
- #34 Kevin Cutler

April 24, 2008
9:30 p.m. ET

Recap
Boxscore

Austin Toros 89, **Idaho Stampede** **90**
Scoring by quarter: 33–27, 12–22, 29–23, 15–18
| Pts: Andre Barrett 27; Rebs: Ian Mahinmi 12; Asts: Andre Barrett 8 | Pts: Cory Violette 19; Rebs: Jason Ellis 16; Asts: Luke Jackson 7 |

Qwest Arena, Boise, Idaho
Attendance: 3,659
Referees:
- #30 Curtis Blair
- #55 Marat Kogut
- #58 Josh Tiven

April 25, 2008
9:30 p.m. ET

Recap
Boxscore

Austin Toros 101, **Idaho Stampede** **108**
Scoring by quarter: 22–29, 24–26, 23–26, 32–27
| Pts: Andre Barrett 29; Rebs: Ian Mahinmi 15; Asts: Barrett, Ham, Johnson, Mahinmi 2 each | Pts: Mike Taylor 27; Rebs: Ellis, Violette 14 each Asts: Luke Jackson 10 |
**Idaho wins series, 2–1**

Qwest Arena, Boise, Idaho
Attendance: 4,124
Referees:
- #30 Curtis Blair
- #15 Eric Dalen
- #55 Marat Kogut

== 2008–09 ==
=== Regular season ===
Complete rosters for each of the 16 2008–09 NBA D-League teams will consist of the ten players drafted November 7 along with seven returning, allocation, and local tryout players. Rosters will be reduced to 12 players on November 20 and opening-day 10-man rosters must be set by November 26 in anticipation of the November 28 tip off of the NBA D-League's eighth season. Each team will play one preseason game between November 19 and 25.

==== Central Division ====
| Team | W | L | PCT | GB | Home | Road |
|---|---|---|---|---|---|---|
| **x**-Iowa Energy (3) | 28 | 22 | .560 | – | 17–8 | 11–14 |
| **x**-Dakota Wizards (6) | 27 | 23 | .540 | 1 | 16–9 | 11–14 |
| **x**-Erie BayHawks (7) | 27 | 23 | .540 | 1 | 16–9 | 11–14 |
| Sioux Falls Skyforce | 25 | 25 | .500 | 3 | 13–12 | 12–13 |
| Fort Wayne Mad Ants | 19 | 31 | .380 | 9 | 11–14 | 8–17 |

==== Southwest Division ====
| Team | W | L | PCT | GB | Home | Road |
|---|---|---|---|---|---|---|
| **x**-Colorado 14ers (1) | 34 | 16 | .680 | – | 20–5 | 14–11 |
| **x**-Austin Toros (4) | 32 | 18 | .640 | 2 | 17–8 | 15–10 |
| Albuquerque Thunderbirds | 24 | 26 | .480 | 10 | 15–10 | 9–16 |
| Rio Grande Valley Vipers | 21 | 29 | .420 | 13 | 12–13 | 9–16 |
| Tulsa 66ers | 15 | 35 | .300 | 19 | 8–17 | 7–18 |

==== Western Division ====
| Team | W | L | PCT | GB | Home | Road |
|---|---|---|---|---|---|---|
| **x**-Utah Flash (2) | 32 | 18 | .640 | – | 17–8 | 15–10 |
| **x**-Idaho Stampede (5) | 31 | 19 | .620 | 1 | 20–5 | 11–14 |
| **x**-Bakersfield Jam (8) | 26 | 24 | .520 | 6 | 16–9 | 10–15 |
| Reno Bighorns | 25 | 25 | .500 | 7 | 18–7 | 7–18 |
| Los Angeles D-Fenders | 19 | 31 | .380 | 13 | 11–14 | 8–17 |
| Anaheim Arsenal | 15 | 35 | .300 | 17 | 9–16 | 6–19 |

Notes

- **x** indicates a team that had qualified for the playoffs
- Number in parentheses indicates the team's seeding for the playoffs.

=== Playoffs ===
The three division winners, along with the next five teams with the best regular season records regardless of division, qualified for the playoffs. The playoffs consist of three rounds with single elimination format for the first two rounds and best-of-three format for the finals. Teams with the better regular season record holds home-court advantage in every rounds. The three division winners were seeded from 1 to 3 based on their regular season records, while the remaining teams were seeded from 4 to 8 based on their regular season records. The three division winners had to choose their opponents in the first round from among the four lowest seeded teams. The fourth seeded team would be paired with the remaining team that is not chosen as an opponent by the three division winners. For the first time in the best-of-three era, a team completed a perfect postseason record, with the 14ers going a perfect 4–0 to win the championship.

First round (April 14–16)
1 | **Colorado*** | **129**
7 | Erie | 108
4 | **Austin** | **119**
5 | Idaho | 116 OT
2 | **Utah*** | **94**
8 | Bakersfield | 81
3 | Iowa* | 109
6 | **Dakota** | **114**

Second round (April 18–20)
1 | **Colorado*** | **114**
4 | Austin | 111
2 | **Utah*** | **103**
6 | Dakota | 93

Finals (April 22–24)
1 | **Colorado*** | **2**
2 | Utah* | 0

Notes

- The numbers to the left of each team indicate the team's seeding.
- The numbers to the right indicate the number of games the team won in that round.
- The division winners are marked by an asterisk (*).
- Teams in **bold** advanced to the next round.
- Teams in italics have home-court advantage in that round.

=== Finals ===
April 22, 2009
9:00 p.m. ET

Recap
Boxscore

**Colorado 14ers** **136**, Utah Flash 131 (OT)
Scoring by quarter: 36–23, 42–38, 23–33, 21–28, Overtime: 14–9
| Pts: Sonny Weems 28; Rebs: Josh Davis 8 Asts: Eddie Gill 8 | Pts: Ronald Dupree 37; Rebs: J. R. Giddens 17; Asts: Dupree, Giddens, Kruger 4 each |

McKay Events Center, Orem, Utah
Attendance: 4,058
Referees:
- #52 James Williams
- #51 Kane Fitzgerald
- #58 Josh Tiven

April 24, 2009
9:00 p.m. ET

Recap
Boxscore

Utah Flash 104, **Colorado 14ers** **123**
Scoring by quarter: 24–26, 35–26, 27–36, 18–35
| Pts: Almond, Kruger 18 each Rebs: J. R. Giddens 15; Asts: Giddens, Kruger 5 each | Pts: Sonny Weems 25; Rebs: Dabbert, Davis, Gilder 7 each Asts: Sonny Weems 7 |
**Colorado wins series, 2–0**

Broomfield Event Center, Broomfield, Colorado
Attendance: 3,059
Referees:
- #34 Kevin Cutler
- #36 Brent Barnaky
- #55 Marat Kogut

== 2009–10 ==
=== Regular season ===
==== Eastern Conference ====
| Team | W | L | PCT | GB | Home | Road |
|---|---|---|---|---|---|---|
| **x**-Iowa Energy (1) | 37 | 13 | .740 | – | 19–6 | 18–7 |
| **x**-Sioux Falls Skyforce (4) | 32 | 18 | .640 | 5 | 20–5 | 12–13 |
| **x**-Dakota Wizards (5) | 29 | 21 | .580 | 8 | 21–4 | 8–17 |
| Maine Red Claws | 27 | 23 | .540 | 10 | 16–9 | 11–14 |
| Fort Wayne Mad Ants | 22 | 28 | .440 | 15 | 13–12 | 9–16 |
| Erie BayHawks | 21 | 29 | .420 | 16 | 10–15 | 11–14 |
| Springfield Armor | 7 | 43 | .140 | 30 | 7–18 | 0–25 |

==== Western Conference ====
| Team | W | L | PCT | GB | Home | Road |
|---|---|---|---|---|---|---|
| **x**-Rio Grande Valley Vipers (2) | 34 | 16 | .680 | – | 21–4 | 13–12 |
| **x**-Austin Toros (3) | 32 | 18 | .640 | 2 | 18–7 | 14–11 |
| **x**-Reno Bighorns (6) | 28 | 22 | .560 | 6 | 15–10 | 13–12 |
| **x**-Utah Flash (7) | 28 | 22 | .560 | 6 | 14–11 | 14–11 |
| **x**-Tulsa 66ers (8) | 26 | 24 | .520 | 8 | 15–10 | 10–15 |
| Idaho Stampede | 25 | 25 | .500 | 9 | 15–10 | 11–14 |
| Albuquerque Thunderbirds | 18 | 32 | .360 | 16 | 13–12 | 5–20 |
| Bakersfield Jam | 17 | 33 | .340 | 17 | 10–15 | 7–18 |
| Los Angeles D-Fenders | 16 | 34 | .320 | 18 | 9–16 | 7–18 |

Notes

- **x** indicates a team that had qualified for the playoffs
- Number in parentheses indicates the team's seeding for the playoffs.

=== Playoffs ===
The Eastern and Western Conference winners, along with the next six teams with the best regular season records regardless of conference, qualified for the playoffs. The playoffs consist of three rounds with best-of-three format. Teams with the better regular season record holds home-court advantage in every rounds. The teams were seeded from 1 to 8 based on their regular season records. The top three seeds had to choose their opponents in the first round from among the four lowest seeded teams. The fourth seeded team would be paired with the remaining team that is not chosen as an opponent by the top three seeds.

This was the first Finals to feature teams with a single affiliation partnership, which featured the Rio Grande Valley Vipers (operated by the Houston Rockets) and the Tulsa 66ers (operated by the Oklahoma City Thunder). The Vipers won Game 1 and then finished Game 2 with a last-second shot by Craig Winder to win their first championship.

First round (April 7–13)
1 | **Iowa*** | **2**
7 | Utah | 1
4 | Sioux Falls | 1
8 | **Tulsa** | **2**
2 | **Rio Grande Valley*** | **2**
6 | Reno | 1
3 | **Austin** | **2**
5 | Dakota | 1

Second round (April 16–21)
1 | Iowa* | 1
8 | **Tulsa** | **2**
2 | **Rio Grande Valley*** | **2**
3 | Austin | 1

Finals (April 25–27)
8 | Tulsa | 0
2 | **Rio Grande Valley*** | **2**

Notes

- The numbers to the left of each team indicate the team's seeding.
- The numbers to the right indicate the number of games the team won in that round.
- The conference champions are marked by an asterisk (*).
- Teams in **bold** advanced to the next round.
- Teams in italics have home-court advantage in that round.

=== Finals ===
April 25, 2010
4:00 p.m. CT

Recap
Boxscore

**Rio Grande Valley Vipers** **124**, Tulsa 66ers 107
Scoring by quarter: 27–27, 34–32, 33–21, 30–27
| Pts: Mike Harris 24; Rebs: Will Conroy 16; Asts: Will Conroy 11 | Pts: Larry Owens 21; Rebs: Latavious Williams 13; Asts: Wink Adams 7 |

Tulsa Convention Center, Tulsa, Oklahoma
Attendance: 5,453
Referees:
- #58 Josh Tiven
- #14 Nick Buchert
- #52 James Williams

April 27, 2010
7:30 p.m. CT

Recap
Boxscore

Tulsa 66ers 91, **Rio Grande Valley Vipers** **94**
Scoring by quarter: 22–24, 21–18, 24–22, 24–30
| Pts: Larry Owens 25; Rebs: Latavious Williams 8 Asts: Wink Adams 8 | Pts: Mike Harris 26; Rebs: Mike Harris 16; Asts: Antonio Anderson 9 |
**Rio Grande Valley wins series, 2–0**

State Farm Arena, Hidalgo, Texas
Attendance: 6,198
Referees:
- #34 Kevin Cutler
- #36 Brent Barnaky
- #33 J. T. Orr

== 2010–11 ==
=== Regular season ===
==== Eastern Conference ====
| Team | W | L | PCT | GB | Home | Road |
|---|---|---|---|---|---|---|
| **x**-Iowa Energy (1) | 37 | 13 | .740 | – | 21–4 | 16–9 |
| **x**-Erie BayHawks (5) | 32 | 18 | .640 | 5 | 18–7 | 14–11 |
| Fort Wayne Mad Ants | 24 | 26 | .480 | 13 | 16–9 | 8–17 |
| Dakota Wizards | 19 | 31 | .380 | 18 | 11–14 | 8–17 |
| Maine Red Claws | 18 | 32 | .360 | 19 | 14–11 | 4–21 |
| Springfield Armor | 13 | 37 | .260 | 24 | 7–18 | 6–19 |
| Sioux Falls Skyforce | 10 | 40 | .200 | 27 | 6–19 | 4–21 |

==== Western Conference ====
| Team | W | L | PCT | GB | Home | Road |
|---|---|---|---|---|---|---|
| **x**-Reno Bighorns (2) | 34 | 16 | .680 | – | 20–5 | 14–11 |
| **x**-Rio Grande Valley Vipers (3) | 33 | 17 | .660 | 1 | 17–8 | 16–9 |
| **x**-Tulsa 66ers (4) | 33 | 17 | .660 | 1 | 17–8 | 16–9 |
| **x**-Bakersfield Jam (6) | 29 | 21 | .580 | 5 | 17–8 | 12–13 |
| **x**-Utah Flash (7) | 28 | 22 | .560 | 6 | 16–9 | 12–13 |
| **x**-Texas Legends (8) | 24 | 26 | .480 | 10 | 15–10 | 9–16 |
| Idaho Stampede | 24 | 26 | .480 | 10 | 12–13 | 12–13 |
| Austin Toros | 22 | 28 | .440 | 12 | 13–12 | 9–16 |
| New Mexico Thunderbirds | 20 | 30 | .400 | 14 | 13–12 | 7–18 |

Notes

- **x** indicates a team that had qualified for the playoffs
- Number in parentheses indicates the team's seeding for the playoffs.

=== Playoffs ===
The Eastern and Western Conference winners, along with the next six teams with the best regular season records regardless of conference, qualified for the playoffs. The playoffs consist of three rounds with best-of-three format. Teams with the better regular season record holds home-court advantage in every rounds. The teams were seeded from 1 to 8 based on their regular season records. The top three seeds had to choose their opponents in the first round from among the four lowest seeded teams. The fourth seeded team would be paired with the remaining team that is not chosen as an opponent by the top three seeds.

First round (April 6–14)
1 | **Iowa*** | **2**
7 | Utah | 1
4 | **Tulsa** | **2**
8 | Texas | 0
2 | **Reno*** | **2**
5 | Erie | 1
3 | **Rio Grande Valley** | **2**
6 | Bakersfield | 1

Second round (April 15–20)
1 | **Iowa*** | **2**
4 | Tulsa | 0
2 | Reno* | 0
3 | **Rio Grande Valley** | **2**

Finals (April 24–29)
1 | **Iowa*** | 2
3 | Rio Grande Valley | 1

Notes

- The numbers to the left of each team indicate the team's seeding.
- The numbers to the right indicate the number of games the team won in that round.
- The conference champions are marked by an asterisk (*).
- Teams in **bold** advanced to the next round.
- Teams in italics have home-court advantage in that round.

=== Finals ===
April 24, 2011
8:00 p.m. ET

Recap
Boxscore

**Iowa Energy** **123**, Rio Grande Valley Vipers 106
Scoring by quarter: 28–37, 31–26, 36–29, 35–34
| Pts: Curtis Stinson 29; Rebs: Curtis Stinson 10; Asts: Hannah, Stinson 10 each | Pts: Mouhammad Faye 22; Rebs: Mouhammad Faye 9 Asts: Terrel Harris 6 |

State Farm Arena, Hidalgo, Texas
Attendance: 4,096
Referees:
- #40 J. T. Orr
- #32 Tre Maddox
- #43 Kevin Scott

April 27, 2011
8:00 p.m. ET

Recap
Boxscore

**Rio Grande Valley Vipers** **141**, Iowa Energy 122
Scoring by quarter: 27–29, 38–34, 41–24, 35–35
| Pts: Jerel McNeal 37; Rebs: Mouhammad Faye 12; Asts: Jerel McNeal 8 | Pts: Moses Ehambe 33; Rebs: Curtis Stinson 10; Asts: Curtis Stinson 12 |

Wells Fargo Arena, Des Moines, Iowa
Attendance: 14,036
Referees:
- #17 Scott Twardoski
- #31 Karl Lane
- #12 Scott Bolnick

April 29, 2011
8:00 p.m. ET

Recap
Boxscore

Rio Grande Valley Vipers 111, **Iowa Energy** **119**
Scoring by quarter: 39–34, 22–28, 27–19, 23–38
| Pts: Jerel McNeal 29; Rebs: Jerel McNeal 11; Asts: Jerel McNeal 6 | Pts: Stefhon Hannah 31; Rebs: Stanley Robinson 11; Asts: Curtis Stinson 4 |
**Iowa wins series, 2–1**

Wells Fargo Arena, Des Moines, Iowa
Attendance: 9,054
Referees:
- #31 Karl Lane
- #32 Tre Maddox
- #40 J. T. Orr

== 2011–12 ==
=== Regular season ===
==== Eastern Conference ====
| Team | W | L | PCT | GB | Home | Road |
|---|---|---|---|---|---|---|
| **x**-Springfield Armor (2) | 29 | 21 | .580 | – | 19–6 | 10–15 |
| **x**-Dakota Wizards (4) | 29 | 21 | .580 | – | 17–8 | 12–13 |
| **x**-Erie BayHawks (5) | 28 | 22 | .563 | 1 | 16–9 | 12–13 |
| **x**-Canton Charge (7) | 27 | 23 | .540 | 2 | 15–10 | 12–13 |
| **x**-Iowa Energy (8) | 25 | 25 | .500 | 4 | 17–8 | 8–17 |
| Maine Red Claws | 21 | 29 | .420 | 8 | 11–14 | 10–15 |
| Sioux Falls Skyforce | 15 | 35 | .292 | 14 | 10–15 | 5–20 |
| Fort Wayne Mad Ants | 14 | 36 | .280 | 15 | 7–18 | 7–18 |

==== Western Conference ====
| Team | W | L | PCT | GB | Home | Road |
|---|---|---|---|---|---|---|
| **x**-Los Angeles D-Fenders (1) | 38 | 12 | .760 | – | 21–4 | 17–8 |
| **x**-Austin Toros (3) | 33 | 17 | .660 | 5 | 19–6 | 14–11 |
| **x**-Bakersfield Jam (6) | 28 | 22 | .560 | 10 | 17–8 | 11–14 |
| Texas Legends | 24 | 26 | .480 | 14 | 15–10 | 9–16 |
| Rio Grande Valley Vipers | 24 | 26 | .480 | 14 | 14–14 | 13–12 |
| Tulsa 66ers | 23 | 27 | .460 | 15 | 13–12 | 10–15 |
| Reno Bighorns | 21 | 29 | .420 | 17 | 12–13 | 9–16 |
| Idaho Stampede | 21 | 29 | .420 | 17 | 13–12 | 8–17 |

Notes

- **x** indicates teams that have qualified for the playoff.

=== Playoffs ===
The Eastern and Western Conference winners, along with the next six teams with the best regular season records regardless of conference, qualified for the playoffs. The playoffs consist of three rounds with best-of-three format. Teams with the better regular season record holds home-court advantage in every rounds. The teams were seeded from 1 to 8 based on their regular season records. The top three seeds had to choose their opponents in the first round from among the four lowest seeded teams. The fourth seeded team would be paired with the remaining team that is not chosen as an opponent by the top three seeds.

First round (April 11–16)
1 | **Los Angeles*** | **2**
8 | Iowa | 0
4 | Dakota | 0
6 | **Bakersfield** | **2**
2 | Springfield* | 1
7 | **Canton** | **2**
3 | **Austin** | **2**
5 | Erie | 1

Second round (April 19–22)
1 | **Los Angeles*** | **2**
6 | Bakersfield | 0
7 | Canton | 1
3 | **Austin** | **2**

Finals (April 24–28)
1 | Los Angeles* | 1
3 | **Austin** | **2**

Notes

- The numbers to the left of each team indicate the team's seeding.
- The numbers to the right indicate the number of games the team won in that round.
- The conference champions are marked by an asterisk (*).
- Teams in **bold** advanced to the next round.
- Teams in italics have home-court advantage in that round.

=== Finals ===
April 24, 2012
8:30 p.m. ET

Recap
Boxscore

**Los Angeles D-Fenders** **109**, Austin Toros 101 (OT)
Scoring by quarter: 19–18, 20–24, 25–24, 29–27, Overtime: 16–8
| Pts: Elijah Millsap 33; Rebs: Malcolm Thomas 25; Asts: Orien Greene, Mardy Collins, Malcolm Thomas 3 each | Pts: Terrance Woodbury 23; Rebs: Woodbury 11; Asts: Cory Joseph 8 |

Cedar Park Center, Cedar Park, Texas
Attendance: 3,621
Referees:
- #13 Steve Anderson
- #37 Matt Myers
- #57 Don Hudson
- #11 Lauren Holtkamp

April 26, 2012
10:00 p.m. ET

Recap
Boxscore

**Austin Toros** **113**, Los Angeles D-Fenders 94
Scoring by quarter: 30–15, 19–23, 30–20, 34–36
| Pts: Julian Wright, Justin Dentmon 26 each Rebs: Wright 11; Asts: Justin Dentmon, Brad Wanamaker 5 each | Pts: Malcolm Thomas 18; Rebs: Thomas 14; Asts: Orien Greene 6 |

Toyota Sports Center, El Segundo, California
Attendance: 350
Referees:
- #63 Ben Taylor
- #12 Scott Bolnick
- #20 Sir Allen Conner
- #26 Brett Nansel

April 28, 2012
9:30 p.m. ET

Recap
Boxscore

**Austin Toros** **122**, Los Angeles D-Fenders 110
Scoring by quarter: 37–31, 30–29, 27–28, 28–22
| Pts: Justin Dentmon 30; Rebs: Eric Dawson 10; Asts: Dentmon, Brad Wanamaker, Carldell Johnson 5 each | Pts: Mardy Collins 31; Rebs: Malcolm Thomas 11; Asts: Mardy Collins 6 |
**Austin wins series, 2–1**

Toyota Sports Center, El Segundo, California
Attendance: 400
Referees:
- #13 Steve Anderson
- #39 C.J. Washington
- #63 Ben Taylor
- #26 Brent Nansal

== 2012–13 ==
=== Regular season ===
==== Eastern Conference ====
| Team | W | L | PCT | GB | Home | Road |
|---|---|---|---|---|---|---|
| **x**-Canton Charge (4) | 30 | 20 | .600 | – | 16–9 | 14–11 |
| **x**-Fort Wayne Mad Ants (5) | 27 | 23 | .540 | 3 | 16–9 | 11–14 |
| **x**- Maine Red Claws (8) | 26 | 24 | .520 | 4 | 14–11 | 12–13 |
| Erie BayHawks | 26 | 24 | .520 | 4 | 12–13 | 12–13 |
| Springfield Armor | 18 | 32 | .360 | 12 | 12–13 | 6–19 |

==== Central Conference ====
| Team | W | L | PCT | GB | Home | Road |
|---|---|---|---|---|---|---|
| **x**-Rio Grande Valley Vipers (2) | 35 | 15 | .700 | – | 20–5 | 15–10 |
| **x**-Austin Toros (6) | 27 | 23 | .540 | 8 | 15–10 | 12–13 |
| **x**-Tulsa 66ers (7) | 27 | 23 | .540 | 8 | 16–9 | 11–14 |
| Sioux Falls Skyforce | 25 | 25 | .500 | 10 | 13–12 | 12–13 |
| Texas Legends | 21 | 29 | .420 | 14 | 13–12 | 8–17 |
| Iowa Energy | 14 | 36 | .280 | 21 | 10–15 | 4–21 |

==== Western Conference ====
| Team | W | L | PCT | GB | Home | Road |
|---|---|---|---|---|---|---|
| **x**-Bakersfield Jam (1) | 36 | 14 | .720 | – | 21–4 | 17–8 |
| **x**-Santa Cruz Warriors (3) | 32 | 18 | .640 | 4 | 19–6 | 13–12 |
| Los Angeles D-Fenders | 21 | 29 | .420 | 17 | 13–12 | 8–17 |
| Idaho Stampede | 19 | 31 | .380 | 17 | 10–15 | 9–16 |
| Reno Bighorns | 16 | 34 | .320 | 20 | 11–14 | 5–20 |

Notes

- **x** indicates teams that have qualified for the playoff
- Maine qualified over Erie due to a better head-to-head record (5–4).

=== Playoffs ===
The three conference winners, along with the next five teams with the best regular season records regardless of conference, qualified for the playoffs. The playoffs consist of three rounds with best-of-three format. Teams with the better regular season record holds home-court advantage in every rounds. The teams were seeded from 1 to 8 based on their regular season records. The top three seeds had to choose their opponents in the first round from among the four lowest seeded teams. The fourth seeded team would be paired with the remaining team that is not chosen as an opponent by the top three seeds. For the second time in league history, a team went undefeated in postseason play to win the championship, with the Rio Grande Valley Vipers going 6–0 becoming the second team in league history to win two titles.

First round (April 10–13)
1 | Bakersfield* | 0
6 | **Austin** | **2**
3 | **Santa Cruz** | **2**
5 | Fort Wayne | 0
2 | **Rio Grande Valley*** | **2**
8 | Maine | 0
4 | Canton | 1
7 | **Tulsa** | **2**

Second round (April 17–21)
6 | Austin | 0
3 | **Santa Cruz** | **2**
2 | **Rio Grande Valley*** | **2**
7 | Tulsa | 0

Finals (April 25–29)
3 | Santa Cruz | 0
2 | **Rio Grande Valley*** | 2

Notes

- The numbers to the left of each team indicate the team's seeding.
- The numbers to the right indicate the number of games the team won in that round.
- The conference champions are marked by an asterisk (*).
- Teams in **bold** advanced to the next round.
- Teams in italics have home-court advantage in that round.

=== Finals ===
April 25, 2013
9:30 p.m. ET

Recap
Boxscore

**Rio Grande Valley Vipers** **112**, Santa Cruz Warriors 102
Scoring by quarter: 24–31, 30–26, 28–28, 30–17
| Pts: Glen Rice Jr. 33; Rebs: Rice, Daniels, Murry 10; Asts: Toure' Murry 10 | Pts: Travis Leslie 19; Rebs: Lance Goulbourne 8 Asts: Stefhon Hannah 5 |

Kaiser Permanente Arena, Santa Cruz, California
Attendance: 2,505
Referees:
- #13 Steve Anderson
- #20 Sir Allen Conner
- #42 Brenda Pantoja
- #26 Brett Nansel

CBS Sports Network

April 27, 2013
8 p.m. ET

Recap

**Rio Grande Valley Vipers** **102**, Santa Cruz Warriors 91
Scoring by quarter: 23–14, 33–27, 17–26, 29–24
| Pts: D. J. Kennedy 27; Rebs: Glen Rice Jr. 13; Asts: D. J. Kennedy 6 | Pts: Travis Leslie, Scott Machado 16; Rebs: Lance Goulbourne 8 Asts: Maurice Baker 6 |
**Rio Grande Valley wins, 2–0**

State Farm Arena, Hidalgo, Texas
Attendance: 6,132
Referees:
- #12 Scott Bolnick
- #39 C.J. Washington
- #63 Ben Taylor

== 2013–14 ==
=== Regular season ===
==== East Division ====
| Team | W | L | PCT | GB | Home | Road |
|---|---|---|---|---|---|---|
| **x**-Fort Wayne Mad Ants (1) | 34 | 16 | .680 | – | 19–6 | 15–10 |
| **x**-Canton Charge (7) | 28 | 22 | .560 | 6 | 17–8 | 11–14 |
| Springfield Armor | 22 | 28 | .440 | 12 | 11–14 | 11–14 |
| Maine Red Claws | 19 | 31 | .380 | 15 | 13–12 | 6–19 |
| Erie BayHawks | 16 | 34 | .320 | 18 | 8–17 | 8–17 |
| Delaware 87ers | 12 | 38 | .240 | 22q | 8–17 | 4–21 |

==== Central Division ====
| Team | W | L | PCT | GB | Home | Road |
|---|---|---|---|---|---|---|
| **x**-Iowa Energy (3) | 31 | 19 | .620 | – | 18–7 | 13–12 |
| **x**-Sioux Falls Skyforce (4) | 31 | 19 | .620 | – | 19–6 | 12–13 |
| **x**-Rio Grande Valley Vipers (5) | 30 | 20 | .600 | 1 | 15–10 | 15–10 |
| Texas Legends | 24 | 26 | .480 | 7 | 14–11 | 10–15 |
| Tulsa 66ers | 24 | 26 | .480 | 7 | 13–12 | 11–14 |
| Austin Toros | 19 | 31 | .380 | 12 | 10–15 | 9–16 |

- In addition to finishing tied with each other, Iowa and Sioux Falls also finished tied with Los Angeles. The tie among the three teams was broken with a multiple-team tiebreaker by comparing the teams' records in games against one another. Los Angeles was 3–2 (.600), Iowa was 4–3 (.571), and Sioux Falls was 4–6 (.400). This gave Los Angeles the #2 seed, Iowa the #3 seed and the Central Division championship and left Sioux Falls with the #4 seed.
- Texas and Tulsa split their regular-season series, 3–3. Texas was 8–11 (.421) against opponents with records of .500 or better compared with Tulsa's record of 12–17 (.414) in such games.

==== West Division ====
| Team | W | L | PCT | GB | Home | Road |
|---|---|---|---|---|---|---|
| **x**-Los Angeles D-Fenders (2) | 31 | 19 | .620 | – | 17–8 | 14–11 |
| **x**-Santa Cruz Warriors (6) | 29 | 21 | .580 | 2 | 16–9 | 13–12 |
| **x**-Reno Bighorns (8) | 27 | 23 | .540 | 4 | 15–10 | 12–13 |
| Idaho Stampede | 24 | 26 | .480 | 7 | 13–12 | 11–14 |
| Bakersfield Jam | 24 | 26 | .480 | 7 | 13–12 | 11–14 |

- Idaho won the season series against Bakersfield, 3–2.

Notes

- **x** indicates teams that have qualified for the playoffs with seeding in (parentheses).
- If Los Angeles had not been involved in a three-way tie with Iowa and Sioux Falls, Iowa still would have won the Central Division championship. Iowa and Sioux Falls split their regular-season series, 3–3. Iowa was 13–14 (.481) against opponents with records of .500 or better compared with Sioux Falls's record of 12–13 (.480) in such games. If Sioux Falls had not been involved in a three-way tie with Iowa and Los Angeles, or if the league broke ties within divisions before interdivisional ties, Iowa would have been the #2 seed based on head-to-head record against Los Angeles, since Iowa won the only game the teams played.
- If the league broke ties for non-playoff teams in the same way as it does to determine playoff seeding, the tie among Texas, Tulsa, Idaho and Bakersfield would have been broken using a multiple-team tiebreaker by considering the teams' records in games they played against one another. Tulsa was 5–4 (.556), Bakersfield was 6–5 (.545), Idaho was 5–5 (.500) and Texas was 6–8 (.429) in such games. This would have given Tulsa fourth place in the Central Division, Bakersfield fourth place in the West Division, Idaho last place in the West Division and Texas fifth place in the Central Division.

=== Playoffs ===
The three division winners, along with the next five teams with the best regular-season records regardless of division qualified for the playoffs. The playoffs consist of three rounds with a best-of-three format. Teams with the better regular-season record hold home-court advantage in each round but play Game 1 on the road and Games 2 and 3 (if necessary) at home. The teams were seeded from 1 to 8 based on their regular-season records. Division winners were not given any special consideration in the seeding and could be the #8 seed. The three division winners, which may or may not be the three top seeds, had to choose their opponents in the first round from among the four lowest seeded wild-card teams. The top-seeded wild-card team was paired with the remaining team that was not chosen as an opponent by the three division winners. The two division winners which are not the top seed were placed in the lower half of the bracket which meant they would meet in the semifinals should they both advance. This would also result in the top two seeds meeting in the semifinals if they were from the same division and both advanced. For the third time, a team went 6–0 in postseason play, which saw the Fort Wayne Mad Ants become champions for the first time ever, while the Santa Cruz Warriors became the first D League team to ever lose back-to-back Finals (a feat not matched as of 2022).

Quarterfinals (April 8–15)
1 | **Fort Wayne*** | 2
8 | Reno | 0
4 | **Sioux Falls** | 2
7 | Canton | 1
2 | Los Angeles* | 0
6 | **Santa Cruz** | 2
3 | Iowa* | 1
5 | **Rio Grande Valley** | 2

Semifinals (April 17–21)
1 | **Fort Wayne*** | 2
4 | Sioux Falls | 0
6 | **Santa Cruz** | 2
5 | Rio Grande Valley | 1

Finals (April 24–28)
1 | **Fort Wayne*** | 2
6 | Santa Cruz | 0

Notes

- The numbers to the left of each team indicate the team's seeding.
- The numbers to the right indicate the number of games the team won in that round.
- The division champions are marked by an asterisk (*).
- Teams in **bold** advanced to the next round.
- Teams in italics have home-court advantage in that round.

=== Quarterfinals ===
April 8, 2014
8:00 p.m. ET

Recap
Boxscore

**Rio Grande Valley Vipers** **146**, Iowa Energy 135
Scoring by quarter: 38–38, 40–33, 36–29, 32–35
| Pts: Darius Morris 29; Rebs: Dario Hunt 10; Asts: Darius Morris 11 | Pts: Patrick Christopher 32; Rebs: Jackie Carmichael 10; Asts: Curtis Stinson 8 |

State Farm Arena, Hidalgo, Texas
Attendance: 4,130
Referees:
- #20 Sir Allen Conner
- #11 Lauren Holtkamp
- #29 Jaston Carter

April 10, 2014
7:00 p.m. ET

Recap
Boxscore

**Canton Charge** **99**, Sioux Falls Skyforce 86
Scoring by quarter: 26–28, 24–20, 19–21, 30–17
| Pts: Shane Edwards 29; Rebs: Arinze Onuaku 19; Asts: Will Cherry 9 | Pts: Craig Smith 24; Rebs: Liggins, Oriakhi 5 Asts: Tre Kelley 5 |

Canton Memorial Civic Center, Canton, Ohio
Attendance: 2,875
Referees:
- #33 Justin Van Duyne
- #62 Jeff Wooten
- #12 Scott Bolnick

April 10, 2014
9:30 p.m. ET

Recap
Boxscore

**Santa Cruz Warriors** **140**, Los Angeles D-Fenders 127
Scoring by quarter: 32–38, 27–33, 39–28, 42–28
| Pts: Seth Curry 44; Rebs: Lance Goulbourne 18; Asts: Seth Curry 7 | Pts: Terrence Williams 27; Rebs: S. Williams, Hyman 8 Asts: Terrence Williams 7 |

Kaiser Permanente Arena, Santa Cruz, California
Attendance: 2,000
Referees:
- #37 Matt Myers
- #25 Brett Nansel
- #20 Sir Allen Conner

April 11, 2014
5:00 p.m. ET

Recap
Boxscore

**Fort Wayne Mad Ants** **97**, Reno Bighorns 96
Scoring by quarter: 21–25, 27–21, 23–25, 26–25
| Pts: Matt Bouldin 20; Rebs: Sadiel Rojas 11; Asts: Matt Bouldin 5 | Pts: Mo Charlo 22; Rebs: Willie Reed 9 Asts: Walker Russell, Jr. 8 |

Reno Events Center, Reno, Nevada
Attendance: 1,586
Referees:
- #30 Mitchell Ervin
- #22 Tyler Ford
- #53 Josue Nieves

April 12, 2014
1:00 p.m. ET

Recap
Boxscore

**Iowa Energy** **145**, Rio Grande Valley Vipers 142 (OT)
Scoring by quarter: 32–40, 30–29, 42–42, 37–30, Overtime: 4–1
| Pts: Patrick Christopher 34; Rebs: Curtis Stinson 14; Asts: Curtis Stinson 8 | Pts: Darius Morris 51; Rebs: Dario Hunt 14; Asts: Darius Morris 18 |

Wells Fargo Arena, Des Moines, Iowa
Attendance: 3,236
Referees:
- #66 Dedric Taylor
- #60 Charles Watson
- #67 Ray Acosta

April 12, 2014
8:00 p.m. ET

Recap
Boxscore

**Sioux Falls Skyforce** **86**, Canton Charge 82
Scoring by quarter: 22–18, 24–26, 19–19, 21–19
| Pts: DeAndre Liggins 21; Rebs: DeAndre Liggins 9 Asts: Tre Kelley 7 | Pts: Antoine Agudio 16; Rebs: Arinze Onuaku 12; Asts: Will Cherry 4 |

Sioux Falls Arena, Sioux Falls, South Dakota
Attendance: 2,374
Referees:
- #57 Don Hudson
- #48 Vladimir Voyard-Tadal
- #54 Jason Goldenberg

CBS Sports Network

April 12, 2014
9:30 p.m. ET

Recap
Boxscore

**Santa Cruz Warriors** **138**, Los Angeles D-Fenders 126
Scoring by quarter: 24–33, 40–25, 44–34, 30–34
| Pts: Cameron Jones 33; Rebs: Ognjen Kuzmić 18; Asts: Nwaelele, Goulbourne 5 | Pts: Brandon Costner 39; Rebs: Shawne Williams 12; Asts: Josh Magette 7 |
**Santa Cruz wins, 2–0**

Toyota Sports Center, El Segundo, California
Attendance: 400
Referees:
- #11 Lauren Holtkamp
- #24 Deldre Carr
- #47 Garrick Shannon

April 13, 2014
7:00 p.m. ET

Recap
Boxscore

**Fort Wayne Mad Ants** **115**, Reno Bighorns 93
Scoring by quarter: 20–24, 30–22, 21–22, 44–25
| Pts: Tony Mitchell 21; Rebs: Frisby, Ohlbrecht 11; Asts: Matt Bouldin 9 | Pts: Trent Lockett 20; Rebs: Reed, B. Davis 8 Asts: Walker Russell, Jr. 4 |
**Fort Wayne wins, 2–0**

Allen County War Memorial Coliseum, Fort Wayne, Indiana
Attendance: 1,976
Referees:
- #12 Scott Bolnick
- #38 Greg Danridge
- #39 C.J. Washington

April 14, 2014
8:00 p.m. ET

Recap
Boxscore

**Sioux Falls Skyforce** **105**, Canton Charge 98
Scoring by quarter: 21–27, 24–20, 25–31, 35–20
| Pts: Tre Kelley 26; Rebs: DeAndre Liggins 6 Asts: DeAndre Liggins 7 | Pts: Agudio, Cherry 21; Rebs: Arinze Onuaku 14; Asts: Will Cherry 12 |
**Sioux Falls wins, 2–1**

Sioux Falls Arena, Sioux Falls, South Dakota
Attendance: 2,534
Referees:
- #66 Dedric Taylor
- #22 Tyler Ford
- #26 Brett Nansel

April 14, 2014
8:00 p.m. ET

Recap
Boxscore

**Rio Grande Valley Vipers** **131**, Iowa Energy 126
Scoring by quarter: 32–32, 31–32, 35–29, 33–33
| Pts: Darius Morris 36; Rebs: Covington, Hagins 9 Asts: Darius Morris 8 | Pts: Patrick Christopher 35; Rebs: Moses Ehambe 9 Asts: Curtis Stinson 8 |
**Rio Grande Valley wins, 2–1**

Wells Fargo Arena, Des Moines, Iowa
Attendance: 4,637
Referees:
- #57 Don Hudson
- #30 Mitchell Ervin
- #54 Jason Goldenberg

=== Semifinals ===
April 17, 2014
8:00 p.m. ET

Recap
Boxscore

**Fort Wayne Mad Ants** **113**, Sioux Falls Skyforce 111
Scoring by quarter: 24–28, 34–29, 21–34, 34–20
| Pts: Sadiel Rojas 20; Rebs: Chris Porter 7 Asts: Tony Mitchell 7 | Pts: Henry Walker 24; Rebs: DeAndre Liggins 13; Asts: Tre Kelley 10 |

Sioux Falls Arena, Sioux Falls, South Dakota
Attendance: 2,701
Referees:
- #33 Justin Van Duyne
- #39 C.J. Washington
- #62 Jeff Wooten

CBS Sports Network

April 17, 2014
9:30 p.m. ET

Recap
Boxscore

**Santa Cruz Warriors** **135**, Rio Grande Valley Vipers 104
Scoring by quarter: 41–23, 32–29, 28–29, 34–23
| Pts: Cameron Jones 24; Rebs: Ognjen Kuzmić 18; Asts: Lance Goulbourne 8 | Pts: Isaiah Canaan 25; Rebs: Dario Hunt 9 Asts: Darius Morris 8 |

Kaiser Permanente Arena, Santa Cruz, California
Attendance: 2,544
Referees:
- #11 Lauren Holtkamp
- #12 Scott Bolnick
- #22 Tyler Ford

April 19, 2014
7:30 p.m. ET

Recap
Boxscore

**Fort Wayne Mad Ants** **126**, Sioux Falls Skyforce 118
Scoring by quarter: 36–20, 43–30, 16–30, 31–38
| Pts: Ron Howard 25; Rebs: Sadiel Rojas 12; Asts: Matt Bouldin 8 | Pts: Craig Smith 20; Rebs: Craig Smith 9 Asts: Tre Kelley 10 |
**Fort Wayne wins, 2–0**

Allen County War Memorial Coliseum, Fort Wayne, Indiana
Attendance: 2,812
Referees:
- #30 Mitchell Ervin
- #54 Jason Goldenberg
- #20 Sir Allen Conner
- #60 Charles Watson

CBS Sports Network

April 19, 2014
8:00 p.m. ET

Recap
Boxscore

**Rio Grande Valley Vipers** **136**, Santa Cruz Warriors 113
Scoring by quarter: 28–28, 35–31, 37–20, 36–34
| Pts: Isaiah Canaan 43; Rebs: Covington, Hagins 12; Asts: Darius Morris 10 | Pts: Mychel Thompson 22; Rebs: Kevin Kotzur 10; Asts: C. Jones, Gardner 8 |

State Farm Arena, Hidalgo, Texas
Attendance: 4,670
Referees:
- #26 Brett Nansel
- #39 C.J. Washington
- #66 Dedric Taylor

CBS Sports Network

April 21, 2014
8:00 p.m. ET

Recap
Boxscore

**Santa Cruz Warriors** **147**, Rio Grande Valley Vipers 128
Scoring by quarter: 36–23, 37–38, 37–34, 37–33
| Pts: Lance Goulbourne 29; Rebs: Lance Goulbourne 14; Asts: Seth Curry 8 | Pts: Isaiah Canaan 35; Rebs: Tony Bishop 9 Asts: Darius Morris 6 |
**Santa Cruz wins, 2–1**

State Farm Arena, Hidalgo, Texas
Attendance: 4,123
Referees:
- #57 Don Hudson
- #33 Justin Van Duyne
- #30 Mitchell Ervin
- #39 C.J. Washington

=== Finals ===
CBS Sports Network

April 24, 2014
9:30 p.m. ET

Recap
Boxscore

**Fort Wayne Mad Ants** **102**, Santa Cruz Warriors 92
Scoring by quarter: 31–23, 28–28, 15–22, 28–19
| Pts: Tony Mitchell 25; Rebs: Sadiel Rojas 11; Asts: Ron Howard 8 | Pts: Cameron Jones 24; Rebs: Lance Goulbourne 11; Asts: Curry, Gardner 3 |

Kaiser Permanente Arena, Santa Cruz, California
Attendance: 2,544
Referees:
- #11 Lauren Holtkamp
- #39 C.J. Washington
- #66 Dedric Taylor

CBS Sports Network

April 26, 2014
7:30 p.m. ET

Recap
Boxscore

**Fort Wayne Mad Ants** **119**, Santa Cruz Warriors 113
Scoring by quarter: 27–27, 38–21, 26–32, 28–33
| Pts: Tony Mitchell 32; Rebs: Sadiel Rojas 10; Asts: Ron Howard 6 | Pts: Seth Curry 29; Rebs: Lance Goulbourne 14; Asts: Cameron Jones 6 |
**Fort Wayne wins, 2–0**

Allen County War Memorial Coliseum, Fort Wayne, Indiana
Attendance: 4,719
Referees:
- #33 Justin Van Duyne
- #12 Scott Bolnick
- #60 Charles Watson
- #30 Mitchell Ervin

== 2014–15 ==
=== Regular season ===
Eastern Conference

East Division
| Team | W | L | PCT | GB | Home | Road |
|---|---|---|---|---|---|---|
| x- Maine Red Claws (1) | 35 | 15 | .700 | – | 20–6 | 15–9 |
| x- Canton Charge (3) | 31 | 19 | .620 | 4 | 14–10 | 17–9 |
| Erie BayHawks | 24 | 26 | .480 | 11 | 15–10 | 9–16 |
| Delaware 87ers | 20 | 30 | .400 | 15 | 11–14 | 9–16 |
| Westchester Knicks | 10 | 40 | .200 | 25 | 9–16 | 1–24 |

Central Division
| Team | W | L | PCT | GB | Home | Road |
|---|---|---|---|---|---|---|
| x- Sioux Falls Skyforce (2) | 29 | 21 | .580 | – | 14–10 | 15–11 |
| x- Fort Wayne Mad Ants (4) | 28 | 22 | .560 | 1 | 14–11 | 14–11 |
| Iowa Energy | 26 | 24 | .520 | 3 | 13–12 | 13–12 |
| Grand Rapids Drive | 23 | 27 | .460 | 6 | 15–9 | 8–18 |

Western Conference

Southwest Division
| Team | W | L | PCT | GB | Home | Road |
|---|---|---|---|---|---|---|
| x- Austin Spurs (2) | 32 | 18 | .640 | – | 18–8 | 14–10 |
| x- Oklahoma City Blue (4) | 28 | 22 | .560 | 4 | 16–9 | 12–13 |
| Rio Grande Valley Vipers | 27 | 23 | .540 | 5 | 14–11 | 13–12 |
| Texas Legends | 22 | 28 | .440 | 10 | 8–17 | 14–11 |

West Division
| Team | W | L | PCT | GB | Home | Road |
|---|---|---|---|---|---|---|
| x- Santa Cruz Warriors (1) | 35 | 15 | .700 | – | 19–7 | 16–8 |
| x- Bakersfield Jam (3) | 34 | 16 | .680 | 1 | 17–8 | 17–8 |
| Reno Bighorns | 20 | 30 | .400 | 15 | 14–11 | 6–19 |
| Los Angeles D-Fenders | 17 | 33 | .340 | 18 | 12–13 | 5–20 |
| Idaho Stampede | 9 | 41 | .180 | 26 | 6–19 | 3–22 |

Quarterfinals (April 8–15)
E1 | Maine* | 0
E4 | Fort Wayne | 2
E2 | Sioux Falls* | 1
E3 | Canton | 2
W1 | Santa Cruz* | 2
W4 | Oklahoma City | 0
W2 | Austin* | 2
W3 | Bakersfield | 1

Semifinals (April 17–21)
E4 | Fort Wayne | 2
E3 | Canton | 0
W1 | Santa Cruz | 2
W2 | Austin | 1

Finals (April 23–27)
E4 | Fort Wayne | 0
W1 | Santa Cruz | 2

=== Finals ===
April 23, 2015
8:00 p.m. ET

Boxscore

Santa Cruz Warriors 119, Fort Wayne Mad Ants 115
Scoring by quarter: 22–34, 31–28, 33–23, 33–30
| Pts: Elliot Williams 31; Rebs: Ognjen Kuzmic 13; Asts: Elliot Williams 8 | Pts: Ramon Harris 30; Rebs: CJ Fair 7 Asts: Jordan Crawford 11 |

Allen County War Memorial Coliseum, Fort Wayne, Indiana
Attendance: 3,318
Referees:
- #22 Tyler Ford
- #26 Brett Nansel
- #39 CJ Washington

April 26, 2015
7:00 p.m. ET

Boxscore

Fort Wayne Mad Ants 96, Santa Cruz Warriors 109
Scoring by quarter: 27–28, 25–31, 19–23, 25–27
| Pts: Jordan Crawford 17; Rebs: Trey McKinney Jones 8 Asts: Matt Bouldin 6 | Pts: Elliot Williams 23; Rebs: Darington Hobson, Taylor Griffin 11 each Asts: Darington Hobson 7 |
Santa Cruz wins series, 2–0

Kaiser Permanente Arena, Santa Cruz, California
Attendance: 2,600
Referees:
- #30 Mitchell Ervin
- #54 Jason Goldenberg
- #68 Gediminis Petraitis

== 2015–16 ==
=== Regular season ===
Eastern Conference

East Division
| Team | W | L | PCT | GB | Home | Road |
|---|---|---|---|---|---|---|
| y-Maine Red Claws | 31 | 19 | .620 | – | 15–10 | 16–9 |
| x-Westchester Knicks | 28 | 22 | .560 | 3 | 13–12 | 15–10 |
| Raptors 905 | 23 | 27 | .460 | 8 | 10–15 | 13–12 |
| Delaware 87ers | 21 | 29 | .420 | 10 | 13–11 | 8–18 |
| Erie BayHawks | 12 | 38 | .240 | 19 | 9–16 | 3–22 |

Central Division
| Team | W | L | PCT | GB | Home | Road |
|---|---|---|---|---|---|---|
| z-Sioux Falls Skyforce | 40 | 10 | .800 | – | 22–3 | 18–7 |
| x-Canton Charge | 31 | 19 | .633 | 9 | 18–7 | 13–12 |
| Iowa Energy | 26 | 24 | .520 | 14 | 15–11 | 12–13 |
| Grand Rapids Drive | 21 | 29 | .420 | 19 | 14–11 | 7–18 |
| Fort Wayne Mad Ants | 20 | 30 | .400 | 20 | 13–12 | 7–18 |

Western Conference

Pacific Division
| Team | W | L | PCT | GB | Home | Road |
|---|---|---|---|---|---|---|
| z-Reno Bighorns | 33 | 17 | .660 | – | 20–5 | 13–12 |
| x-Los Angeles D-Fenders | 27 | 23 | .540 | 6 | 17–8 | 10–15 |
| Bakersfield Jam | 22 | 28 | .440 | 11 | 13–12 | 9–16 |
| Idaho Stampede | 20 | 30 | .400 | 13 | 13–12 | 7–18 |
| Santa Cruz Warriors | 19 | 31 | .380 | 14 | 12–13 | 7–18 |

SouthwestDivision
| Team | W | L | PCT | GB | Home | Road |
|---|---|---|---|---|---|---|
| y-Austin Spurs | 30 | 20 | .600 | – | 15–10 | 15–10 |
| x-Rio Grande Valley Vipers | 29 | 21 | .580 | 1 | 18–7 | 11–14 |
| Texas Legends | 23 | 27 | .460 | 7 | 13–12 | 10–15 |
| Oklahoma City Blue | 19 | 31 | .380 | 11 | 10–15 | 9–16 |

=== Finals boxscore ===
April 24, 2016
6:00 p.m. CT

Boxscore

Sioux Falls Skyforce 104, Los Angeles D-Fenders 99
Scoring by quarter: 21–22, 30–23, 24–23, 29–31
| Pts: Rodney McGruder 30; Rebs: Rodney McGruder 11; Asts: DeAndre Liggins 8 | Pts: Vander Blue 31; Rebs: Justin Harper 7 Asts: Josh Magette 8 |

Toyota Sports Center, El Segundo, California
Attendance: 550
Referees:
- #14 JB DeRosa
- #26 Brett Nansel
- #70 Aaron Smith

April 26, 2016
7:00 p.m. CT

Boxscore

Los Angeles D-Fenders 109, Sioux Falls Skyforce 102
Scoring by quarter: 27–26, 25–27, 28–26, 29–23
| Pts: Vander Blue 29; Rebs: Ryan Gomes 11; Asts: Josh Magette 10 | Pts: Greg Whittington 17; Rebs: DeAndre Liggins 10; Asts: DeAndre Liggins 6 |

Sanford Pentagon, Sioux Falls, South Dakota
Attendance: 3,250
Referees:
- #39 CJ Washington
- #45 Ray Acosta
- #48 Vladimir Voyard-Tadal

April 27, 2016
7:00 p.m. CT

Boxscore

Los Angeles D-Fenders 63, Sioux Falls Skyforce 91
Scoring by quarter: 17–22, 18–20, 13–27, 15–22
| Pts: Josh Magette 21; Rebs: D.J. Shumpert 8 Asts: Josh Magette 3 | Pts: Jarnell Stokes 25; Rebs: Jarnell Stokes 12; Asts: DeAndre Liggins 6 |
Sioux Falls wins series, 2–1

Sanford Pentagon, Sioux Falls, South Dakota
Attendance: 3,016
Referees:
- #26 Brett Nansel
- #39 CJ Washington
- #45 Ray Acosta

== 2016–17 ==
Final standings.

=== Eastern Conference ===
Atlantic Division

| Team (affiliate) | W | L | PCT | GB | Home | Road |
|---|---|---|---|---|---|---|
| y – Maine Red Claws (BOS) | 29 | 21 | .580 | 0 | 15–10 | 14–11 |
| Delaware 87ers (PHI) | 26 | 24 | .520 | 3 | 15–10 | 11–14 |
| Westchester Knicks (NYK) | 19 | 31 | .380 | 10 | 12–13 | 7–18 |
| Greensboro Swarm (CHA) | 19 | 31 | .380 | 10 | 13–12 | 6–19 |
| Long Island Nets (BKN) | 17 | 33 | .340 | 12 | 10–15 | 7–18 |
| Erie BayHawks (ORL) | 14 | 36 | .280 | 15 | 9–16 | 5–20 |

Central Division

| Team (affiliate) | W | L | PCT | GB | Home | Road |
|---|---|---|---|---|---|---|
| z – Raptors 905 (TOR) | 39 | 11 | .780 | 0 | 18–7 | 21–4 |
| x – Fort Wayne Mad Ants (IND) | 30 | 20 | .600 | 9 | 16–9 | 14–11 |
| x – Canton Charge (CLE) | 29 | 21 | .580 | 10 | 17–8 | 12–13 |
| Grand Rapids Drive (DET) | 26 | 24 | .520 | 13 | 15–10 | 11–14 |
| Windy City Bulls (CHI) | 23 | 27 | .460 | 16 | 15–10 | 8–17 |

=== Western Conference ===
Southwest Division

| Team (affiliate) | W | L | PCT | GB | Home | Road |
|---|---|---|---|---|---|---|
| y – Oklahoma City Blue (OKC) | 34 | 16 | .680 | 0 | 19–6 | 15–10 |
| x – Rio Grande Valley Vipers (HOU) | 32 | 18 | .640 | 2 | 19–6 | 13–12 |
| Sioux Falls Skyforce (MIA) | 29 | 21 | .580 | 5 | 16–9 | 13–12 |
| Austin Spurs (SAS) | 25 | 25 | .500 | 9 | 13–12 | 12–13 |
| Texas Legends (DAL) | 25 | 25 | .500 | 9 | 14–11 | 11–14 |
| Iowa Energy (MEM) | 12 | 38 | .240 | 22 | 6–19 | 6–19 |

Pacific Division

| Team (affiliate) | W | L | PCT | GB | Home | Road |
|---|---|---|---|---|---|---|
| y – Los Angeles D-Fenders (LAL) | 34 | 16 | .680 | 0 | 16–9 | 18–7 |
| x – Santa Cruz Warriors (GSW) | 31 | 19 | .620 | 3 | 18–7 | 13–12 |
| Northern Arizona Suns (PHX) | 22 | 28 | .440 | 12 | 14–11 | 8–17 |
| Reno Bighorns (SAC) | 21 | 29 | .420 | 13 | 12–13 | 9–16 |
| Salt Lake City Stars (UTA) | 14 | 36 | .280 | 20 | 7–18 | 7–18 |

=== Finals boxscore ===
April 23, 2017
8:00 p.m. ET

Boxscore

Raptors 905 106, Rio Grande Valley Vipers 119
Scoring by quarter: 31–29, 20–26, 31–38, 24–26
| Pts: CJ Leslie 25; Rebs: Pascal Siakam 10; Asts: John Jordan 8 | Pts: Darius Morris 23; Rebs: Chinanu Onuaku, Joshua Smith 10 each Asts: Darius Morris 11 |

McAllen Convention Center, McAllen, Texas
Attendance: 1,969
Referees:
- #45 Ray Acosta
- #54 Jason Goldenberg
- #70 Aaron Smith

April 25, 2017
7:00 p.m. ET

Boxscore

Rio Grande Valley Vipers 85, Raptors 905 95
Scoring by quarter: 22–23, 23–31, 22–18, 19–23
| Pts: Kyle Wiltjer 25; Rebs: Kyle Wiltjer 12; Asts: Darius Morris 7 | Pts: Pascal Siakam 32; Rebs: Pascal Siakam 10; Asts: Fred VanVleet 9 |

Hershey Centre, Mississauga, Ontario
Attendance: 3,359
Referees:
- #14 JB DeRosa
- #23 Jacyn Goble
- #48 Vladimir Voyard-Tadal

April 27, 2017
7:00 p.m. ET

Boxscore

Rio Grande Valley Vipers 96, Raptors 905 122
Scoring by quarter: 18–27, 31–30, 20–33, 27–32
| Pts: Troy Williams 23; Rebs: Chris Walker 9 Asts: Jarvis Threatt 7 | Pts: Bruno Caboclo 31; Rebs: Bruno Caboclo, Yanick Moreira 11 each Asts: Fred VanVleet 14 |
Raptors 905 wins series, 2–1

Hershey Centre, Mississauga, Ontario
Attendance: 4,824
Referees:
- #26 Brett Nansel
- #39 CJ Washington
- #46 Jonathan Sterling

== 2017–18 ==
Finals standings.

x – qualified for playoffs; y – Division champion; z – Conference champion

=== Eastern Conference ===
Atlantic Division

| Team (affiliate) | W | L | PCT | GB | Home | Road |
|---|---|---|---|---|---|---|
| z – Westchester Knicks (NYK) | 32 | 18 | .640 | 0 | 13–12 | 19–6 |
| x – Raptors 905 (TOR) | 31 | 19 | .620 | 1 | 18–7 | 13–12 |
| Long Island Nets (BKN) | 27 | 23 | .540 | 5 | 14–11 | 13–12 |
| Maine Red Claws (BOS) | 17 | 33 | .340 | 15 | 14–11 | 3–22 |

Central Division

| Team (affiliate) | W | L | PCT | GB | Home | Road |
|---|---|---|---|---|---|---|
| y – Fort Wayne Mad Ants (IND) | 29 | 21 | .580 | 0 | 19–6 | 10–15 |
| x – Grand Rapids Drive (DET) | 29 | 21 | .580 | 0 | 16–9 | 13–12 |
| Windy City Bulls (CHI) | 24 | 26 | .480 | 5 | 13–12 | 11–14 |
| Canton Charge (CLE) | 22 | 28 | .440 | 7 | 9–16 | 13–12 |
| Wisconsin Herd (MIL) | 21 | 29 | .420 | 8 | 8–17 | 13–12 |

Southeast Division

| Team (affiliate) | W | L | PCT | GB | Home | Road |
|---|---|---|---|---|---|---|
| y – Erie BayHawks (ATL) | 28 | 22 | .560 | 0 | 15–10 | 13–12 |
| x – Lakeland Magic (ORL) | 28 | 22 | .560 | 0 | 15–10 | 13–12 |
| Greensboro Swarm (CHA) | 16 | 34 | .320 | 12 | 9–16 | 7–18 |
| Delaware 87ers (PHI) | 16 | 34 | .320 | 12 | 6–19 | 10–15 |

=== Western Conference ===
Midwest Division

| Team (affiliate) | W | L | PCT | GB | Home | Road |
|---|---|---|---|---|---|---|
| y – Oklahoma City Blue (OKC) | 28 | 22 | .560 | 0 | 15–10 | 13–12 |
| Sioux Falls Skyforce (MIA) | 25 | 25 | .500 | 3 | 13–12 | 12–13 |
| Iowa Wolves (MIN) | 24 | 26 | .480 | 4 | 14–11 | 10–15 |
| Memphis Hustle (MEM) | 21 | 29 | .420 | 7 | 10–15 | 11–14 |

Pacific Division

| Team (affiliate) | W | L | PCT | GB | Home | Road |
|---|---|---|---|---|---|---|
| y – Reno Bighorns (SAC) | 29 | 21 | .580 | 0 | 14–11 | 15–10 |
| x – South Bay Lakers (LAL) | 28 | 22 | .560 | 1 | 16–9 | 12–13 |
| Santa Cruz Warriors (GSW) | 23 | 27 | .460 | 6 | 13–12 | 10–15 |
| Northern Arizona Suns (PHX) | 23 | 27 | .460 | 6 | 13–12 | 10–15 |
| Agua Caliente Clippers (LAC) | 23 | 27 | .460 | 6 | 14–11 | 9–16 |

Southwest Division

| Team (affiliate) | W | L | PCT | GB | Home | Road |
|---|---|---|---|---|---|---|
| z – Austin Spurs (SAS) | 32 | 18 | .640 | 0 | 17–8 | 15–10 |
| x – Rio Grande Valley Vipers (HOU) | 29 | 21 | .580 | 3 | 14–11 | 15–10 |
| x – Texas Legends (DAL) | 29 | 21 | .580 | 3 | 16–9 | 13–12 |
| Salt Lake City Stars (UTA) | 16 | 34 | .320 | 16 | 11–14 | 5–20 |

=== Finals boxscore ===
April 8, 2018
7:00 p.m. ET

Boxscore

Raptors 905 93, Austin Spurs 105
Scoring by quarter: 23–30, 26–24, 27–27, 17–24
| Pts: Lorenzo Brown 20; Rebs: Kennedy Meeks 9 Asts: Lorenzo Brown 10 | Pts: Derrick White 35; Rebs: Jaron Blossomgame 11; Asts: Darrun Hilliard 4 |

H-E-B Center at Cedar Park, Cedar Park, Texas
Attendance: 4,321
Referees:
- #24 Brandon Adair
- #37 Matt Myers
- #48 Vladimir Voyard-Tadal

April 10, 2018
8:00 p.m. ET

Boxscore

Austin Spurs 98, Raptors 905 76
Scoring by quarter: 28–18, 18–20, 27–24, 25–14
| Pts: Nick Johnson 17; Rebs: Jaron Blossomgame 10; Asts: Olivier Hanlan 7 | Pts: Malcolm Miller, Kaza Kajami-Keane 12 each Rebs: Alfonzo McKinnie, Kennedy Meeks 9 each Asts: Lorenzo Brown 10 |
Austin wins series, 2–0

Hershey Centre, Mississauga, Ontario
Attendance: 3,262
Referees:
- #11 Randy Richardson
- #19 Phenizee Ransom
- #35 John Butler

== 2018–19 ==
Regular Season Final standings:

x – qualified for playoffs; y – Division champion; z – Conference champion

=== Eastern Conference ===
Atlantic Division

| Team (affiliate) | W | L | PCT | GB | Home | Road |
|---|---|---|---|---|---|---|
| z – Long Island Nets (BKN) | 34 | 16 | .680 | 0 | 19–6 | 15–10 |
| x – Westchester Knicks (NYK) | 29 | 21 | .580 | 5 | 16–9 | 13–12 |
| x – Raptors 905 (TOR) | 29 | 21 | .580 | 5 | 13–12 | 16–9 |
| Delaware Blue Coats (PHI) | 21 | 29 | .420 | 13 | 13–12 | 8–17 |
| Maine Red Claws (BOS) | 19 | 31 | .380 | 15 | 11–14 | 8–17 |

Central Division

| Team (affiliate) | W | L | PCT | GB | Home | Road |
|---|---|---|---|---|---|---|
| y – Grand Rapids Drive (DET) | 28 | 22 | .560 | 0 | 14–11 | 14–11 |
| x – Windy City Bulls (CHI) | 27 | 23 | .540 | 1 | 15–10 | 12–13 |
| Fort Wayne Mad Ants (IND) | 23 | 27 | .460 | 5 | 14–11 | 9–16 |
| Canton Charge (CLE) | 22 | 28 | .429 | 6 | 10–15 | 12–13 |
| Wisconsin Herd (MIL) | 12 | 38 | .240 | 16 | 8–17 | 4–21 |

Southeast Division

| Team (affiliate) | W | L | PCT | GB | Home | Road |
|---|---|---|---|---|---|---|
| y – Lakeland Magic (ORL) | 32 | 18 | .640 | 0 | 18–7 | 14–11 |
| Capital City Go-Go (WAS) | 25 | 25 | .500 | 7 | 14–11 | 11–14 |
| Greensboro Swarm (CHA) | 24 | 26 | .480 | 8 | 10–15 | 14–11 |
| Erie BayHawks (ATL) | 24 | 26 | .469 | 8 | 17–8 | 7–18 |

=== Western Conference ===
Midwest Division

| Team (affiliate) | W | L | PCT | GB | Home | Road |
|---|---|---|---|---|---|---|
| y – Oklahoma City Blue (OKC) | 34 | 16 | .680 | 0 | 17–8 | 17–8 |
| x – Memphis Hustle (MEM) | 28 | 22 | .560 | 6 | 16–9 | 12–13 |
| Sioux Falls Skyforce (MIA) | 24 | 26 | .480 | 10 | 13–12 | 11–14 |
| Iowa Wolves (MIN) | 20 | 30 | .400 | 14 | 13–12 | 7–18 |

Pacific Division

| Team (affiliate) | W | L | PCT | GB | Home | Road |
|---|---|---|---|---|---|---|
| y – Santa Cruz Warriors (GSW) | 34 | 16 | .680 | 0 | 20–5 | 14–11 |
| x – Stockton Kings (SAC) | 30 | 20 | .600 | 4 | 18–7 | 12–13 |
| Agua Caliente Clippers (LAC) | 26 | 24 | .520 | 8 | 14–11 | 12–13 |
| South Bay Lakers (LAL) | 21 | 29 | .420 | 13 | 13–12 | 8–17 |
| Northern Arizona Suns (PHX) | 12 | 38 | .240 | 22 | 7–18 | 5–20 |

Southwest Division

| Team (affiliate) | W | L | PCT | GB | Home | Road |
|---|---|---|---|---|---|---|
| z – Rio Grande Valley Vipers (HOU) | 34 | 16 | .680 | 0 | 18–7 | 16–9 |
| x – Salt Lake City Stars (UTA) | 27 | 23 | .540 | 7 | 15–10 | 12–13 |
| Austin Spurs (SAS) | 20 | 30 | .400 | 14 | 13–12 | 7–18 |
| Texas Legends (DAL) | 16 | 34 | .320 | 18 | 14–11 | 2–23 |

=== Finals boxscore ===
April 7, 2019
7:00 p.m. ET

Recap and Boxscore

Rio Grande Valley Vipers 107, Long Island Nets 117
Scoring by quarter: 18–37, 31–22, 27–31, 31–27
| Pts: Jordan Johnson 23; Rebs: Isaiah Hartenstein 17; Asts: Jordan Johnson 3 | Pts: Dzanan Musa23; Thomas Wimbush 23 each Rebs: Alan Williams 16; Asts: Tahjere McCall 4 |

Island Federal Credit Union Arena, Stony Brook, New York
Attendance: 2,431
Referees:
- #16 Nate Green
- #65 Andy Nagy
- #76 Toni Patillo
- #31

April 9, 2019
8:00 p.m. ET

Recap and Boxscore

Long Island Nets 116, Rio Grande Valley Vipers 127
Scoring by quarter: 27–27, 29–37, 30–30, 30–33
| Pts: Theo Pinson 32; Rebs: Theo Pinson 11; Asts: Jordan McLaughlin 6 | Pts: Isaiah Hartenstein 33; Rebs: Isaiah Hartenstein 13; Asts: Jordan Johnson 9 |

Bert Ogden Arena, Edinburg, Texas
Attendance: 8,208
Referees:
- #17 Matt Kallio
- #49 Evan Scott
- #35 John Butler

April 12, 2019
8:00 p.m. ET

Boxscore
Play-by-Play

Rio Grande Valley Vipers 129, Long Island Nets 112
Scoring by quarter: 38–24, 37–23, 28–27, 26–38
| Pts: Isaiah Hartenstein 30; Rebs: Isaiah Hartenstein 17; Asts: Michael Frazier II 6 | Pts: Alan Williams 26; Rebs: Alan Williams 21; Asts: Jordan McLaughlin 9 |
Rio Grande Valley wins series, 2–1

Island Federal Credit Union Arena, Stony Brook, New York
Attendance: 2,783
Referees:
- #49 Evan Scott
- #16 Nate Green
- #42 Kevin Fahy
- #35 John Butler

== 2019–20 ==
Final standings when the season was curtailed on March 12, 2020:

x – qualified for playoffs; y – Division champion; z – Conference champion

=== Eastern Conference ===
Atlantic Division

| Team (affiliate) | W | L | PCT | GB | Home | Road |
|---|---|---|---|---|---|---|
| Maine Red Claws (BOS) | 28 | 14 | .667 | 0 | 14–6 | 14–8 |
| Delaware Blue Coats (PHI) | 22 | 21 | .512 | 6.5 | 10–12 | 12–9 |
| Raptors 905 (TOR) | 22 | 21 | .512 | 6.5 | 12–8 | 10–13 |
| Long Island Nets (BKN) | 19 | 23 | .452 | 9 | 10–14 | 9–9 |
| Westchester Knicks (NYK) | 17 | 24 | .415 | 10.5 | 7–13 | 10–11 |

Central Division

| Team (affiliate) | W | L | PCT | GB | Home | Road |
|---|---|---|---|---|---|---|
| x – Wisconsin Herd (MIL) | 33 | 10 | .767 | 0 | 16–7 | 17–3 |
| x – Canton Charge (CLE) | 29 | 14 | .674 | 4 | 20–4 | 9–10 |
| Grand Rapids Drive (DET) | 25 | 18 | .581 | 8 | 12–7 | 13–11 |
| Fort Wayne Mad Ants (IND) | 21 | 22 | .488 | 12 | 16–8 | 5–14 |
| Windy City Bulls (CHI) | 17 | 26 | .395 | 16 | 7–13 | 10–13 |

Southeast Division

| Team (affiliate) | W | L | PCT | GB | Home | Road |
|---|---|---|---|---|---|---|
| Lakeland Magic (ORL) | 25 | 17 | .595 | 0 | 11–11 | 14–6 |
| Capital City Go-Go (WAS) | 22 | 21 | .512 | 3.5 | 14–7 | 8–14 |
| College Park Skyhawks (ATL) | 20 | 23 | .465 | 5.5 | 9–10 | 11–13 |
| Erie BayHawks (NO) | 13 | 30 | .302 | 12.5 | 8–12 | 5–18 |
| Greensboro Swarm (CHA) | 9 | 34 | .209 | 16.5 | 4–17 | 5–17 |

=== Western Conference ===
Midwest Division

| Team (affiliate) | W | L | PCT | GB | Home | Road |
|---|---|---|---|---|---|---|
| Memphis Hustle (MEM) | 26 | 15 | .634 | 0 | 14–7 | 12–8 |
| Sioux Falls Skyforce (MIA) | 22 | 20 | .524 | 4.5 | 15–7 | 7–13 |
| Oklahoma City Blue (OKC) | 20 | 22 | .476 | 6.5 | 12–10 | 8–12 |
| Iowa Wolves (MIN) | 19 | 24 | .442 | 8 | 10–13 | 9–11 |

Pacific Division

| Team (affiliate) | W | L | PCT | GB | Home | Road |
|---|---|---|---|---|---|---|
| Stockton Kings (SAC) | 24 | 19 | .558 | 0 | 12–8 | 12–11 |
| Santa Cruz Warriors (GSW) | 21 | 21 | .500 | 2.5 | 8–12 | 13–9 |
| Agua Caliente Clippers (LAC) | 22 | 22 | .500 | 2.5 | 12–10 | 10–12 |
| South Bay Lakers (LAL) | 19 | 25 | .432 | 5.5 | 13–6 | 6–19 |
| Northern Arizona Suns (PHX) | 8 | 34 | .190 | 15.5 | 3–18 | 5–16 |

Southwest Division

| Team (affiliate) | W | L | PCT | GB | Home | Road |
|---|---|---|---|---|---|---|
| x – Salt Lake City Stars (UTA) | 30 | 12 | .714 | 0 | 17–6 | 13–6 |
| Austin Spurs (SAS) | 24 | 18 | .571 | 6 | 13–9 | 11–9 |
| Texas Legends (DAL) | 24 | 19 | .558 | 6.5 | 12–11 | 12–8 |
| Rio Grande Valley Vipers (HOU) | 15 | 27 | .357 | 15 | 6–13 | 9–14 |

== 2020–21 ==
=== Regular season ===
| Pos | Team | W | L | PCT | GB |
|---|---|---|---|---|---|
| 1 | y – Raptors 905 (TOR) | 12 | 3 | .800 | — |
| 2 | x – Santa Cruz Warriors (GSW) | 11 | 4 | .733 | 1 |
| 3 | x – Erie BayHawks (NO) | 11 | 4 | .733 | 1 |
| 4 | x – Delaware Blue Coats (PHI) | 10 | 5 | .667 | 2 |
| 5 | x – Austin Spurs (SAS) | 10 | 5 | .667 | 2 |
| 6 | x – Lakeland Magic (ORL) | 9 | 6 | .600 | 3 |
| 7 | x – Rio Grande Valley Vipers (HOU) | 9 | 6 | .600 | 3 |
| 8 | x – NBA G League Ignite | 8 | 7 | .533 | 4 |
| 9 | Oklahoma City Blue (OKC) | 8 | 7 | .533 | 4 |
| 10 | Long Island Nets (BKN) | 7 | 8 | .467 | 5 |
| 11 | Westchester Knicks (NYK) | 7 | 8 | .467 | 5 |
| 12 | Memphis Hustle (MEM) | 6 | 9 | .400 | 6 |
| 13 | Fort Wayne Mad Ants (IND) | 6 | 9 | .400 | 6 |
| 14 | Canton Charge (CLE) | 5 | 10 | .333 | 7 |
| 15 | Greensboro Swarm (CHA) | 5 | 10 | .333 | 7 |
| 16 | Agua Caliente Clippers (LAC) | 5 | 10 | .333 | 7 |
| 17 | Salt Lake City Stars (UTA) | 4 | 11 | .267 | 8 |
| 18 | Iowa Wolves (MIN) | 2 | 13 | .133 | 10 |

Source: GLeague.NBA.com
x – Qualified for playoffs; y – Clinched top seed

=== Playoffs ===
For the first time since the 2006–07 NBA Development League season, the playoffs were held entirely as a single-elimination bracket (the league held this type of format from 2003 to 2007, albeit with four teams for the first three seasons and six for the last season).

Quarterfinals; March 8
1 | Raptors 905 | 127
8 | Ignite | 102
4 | Delaware Blue Coats | 124
5 | Austin Spurs | 103
2 | Santa Cruz Warriors | 110
7 | Rio Grande Valley Vipers | 81
3 | Erie BayHawks | 110
6 | Lakeland Magic | 139

Semifinals; March 9
1 | Raptors 905 | 100
4 | Delaware Blue Coats | 127
2 | Santa Cruz Warriors | 96
6 | Lakeland Magic | 108

Championship; March 11
4 | Delaware Blue Coats | 78
6 | Lakeland Magic | 97

=== Championship boxscore ===
March 11, 2021
4:30 p.m. ET

Boxscore

Lakeland Magic 97, Delaware Blue Coats 78
Scoring by quarter: 21–11, 25–23, 31–20, 20–24
| Pts: Devin Cannady 22; Rebs: Karim Mane 8 Asts: Jeff Dowtin Jr. 7 | Pts: Rayjon Tucker 20; Rebs: Paul Reed 11; Asts: Justin Robinson 5 |

AdventHealth Arena, Orlando, Florida
Attendance: Game was behind closed doors
Referees:
- #18 Isaac Barnett
- #55 Cheryl Flores
- #80 Jamahl Ralls
- #36 Tyler Ricks

== 2021–22 ==
=== Eastern Conference ===
| Pos | Team | W | L | PCT | GB |
|---|---|---|---|---|---|
| 1 | y – Raptors 905 (TOR) | 24 | 8 | .750 | — |
| 2 | x – Motor City Cruise (DET) | 22 | 10 | .688 | 2 |
| 3 | x – Delaware Blue Coats (PHI) | 22 | 10 | .688 | 2 |
| 4 | x – Capital City Go-Go (WAS) | 21 | 10 | .677 | 2.5 |
| 5 | x – College Park Skyhawks (ATL) | 20 | 13 | .606 | 4.5 |
| 6 | x – Long Island Nets (BKN) | 18 | 15 | .545 | 6.5 |
| 7 | e – Grand Rapids Gold (DEN) | 17 | 15 | .531 | 7 |
| 8 | e – Westchester Knicks (NYK) | 17 | 15 | .531 | 7 |
| 9 | e – Fort Wayne Mad Ants (IND) | 17 | 17 | .500 | 8 |
| 10 | e – Maine Celtics (BOS) | 16 | 16 | .500 | 8 |
| 11 | e – Windy City Bulls (CHI) | 15 | 19 | .441 | 10 |
| 12 | e – Lakeland Magic (ORL) | 11 | 21 | .344 | 13 |
| 13 | e – Greensboro Swarm (CHA) | 9 | 24 | .273 | 15.5 |
| 14 | e – Wisconsin Herd (MIL) | 8 | 24 | .250 | 16 |
| 15 | e – Cleveland Charge (CLE) | 6 | 26 | .188 | 18 |

Source: GLeague.NBA.com
e – Eliminated; x – Qualified for playoffs; y – Clinched top seed

=== Western Conference ===
| Pos | Team | W | L | PCT | GB |
|---|---|---|---|---|---|
| 1 | y – Rio Grande Valley Vipers (HOU) | 24 | 10 | .706 | — |
| 2 | x – Agua Caliente Clippers (LAC) | 22 | 11 | .667 | 1.5 |
| 3 | x – South Bay Lakers (LAL) | 21 | 11 | .656 | 2 |
| 4 | x – Birmingham Squadron (NO) | 18 | 14 | .563 | 5 |
| 5 | x – Texas Legends (DAL) | 19 | 15 | .559 | 5 |
| 6 | x – Santa Cruz Warriors (GSW) | 15 | 17 | .469 | 8 |
| 7 | e – Iowa Wolves (MIN) | 15 | 17 | .469 | 8 |
| 8 | e – Stockton Kings (SAC) | 15 | 18 | .455 | 8.5 |
| 9 | e – Memphis Hustle (MEM) | 15 | 19 | .441 | 9 |
| 10 | e – Oklahoma City Blue (OKC) | 15 | 20 | .429 | 9.5 |
| 11 | e – Austin Spurs (SAS) | 13 | 19 | .406 | 10 |
| 12 | e – Sioux Falls Skyforce (MIA) | 14 | 21 | .400 | 10.5 |
| 13 | e – Salt Lake City Stars (UTA) | 9 | 23 | .281 | 14 |

Source: GLeague.NBA.com
e – Eliminated; x – Qualified for playoffs; y – Clinched top seed

=== Finals boxscore ===
April 12, 2022
9:00 p.m. ET

Play-by-Play
Boxscore

Delaware Blue Coats 128, Rio Grande Valley Vipers 145
Scoring by quarter: 36–35, 29–42, 32–36, 31–32
| Pts: Patrick McCaw 24; Rebs: Patrick McCaw 9 Asts: Shamorie Ponds 9 | Pts: Trevelin Queen 44; Rebs: Mfiondu Kabengele 14; Asts: Daishen Nix 11 |

Bert Ogden Arena, Edinburg, Texas
Attendance: 4,186
Referees:
- #12 Robert Hussey
- #55 Cheryl Flores
- #36 Tyler Ricks
- #77 Jenna Reneau

April 14, 2022
8:00 p.m. ET

Recap
Boxscore

Rio Grande Valley Vipers 131, Delaware Blue Coats 114
Scoring by quarter: 43–28, 26–29, 35–29, 27–28
| Pts: Mfiondu Kabengele 29; Rebs: Daishen Nix 11; Asts: Daishen Nix 8 | Pts: Myles Powell 28; Rebs: Shaquille Harrison 12; Asts: Shaquille Harrison 9 |
Rio Grande Valley wins series, 2–0

Chase Fieldhouse, Wilmington, Delaware
Attendance: 2,619
Referees:
- #17 Matt Kallio
- #13 Dannica Mosher
- #80 Jamahl Ralls
- #18 Isaac Barnett

== 2022–23 ==
=== Eastern Conference ===
| Pos | Team | W | L | PCT | GB |
|---|---|---|---|---|---|
| 1 | y – Long Island Nets (BKN) | 23 | 9 | .719 | — |
| 2 | x – Delaware Blue Coats (PHI) | 20 | 12 | .625 | 3 |
| 3 | x – Capital City Go-Go (WAS) | 19 | 13 | .594 | 4 |
| 4 | x – Maine Celtics (BOS) | 19 | 13 | .594 | 4 |
| 5 | x – Cleveland Charge (CLE) | 18 | 14 | .563 | 5 |
| 6 | x – Fort Wayne Mad Ants (IND) | 18 | 14 | .563 | 5 |
| 7 | e – Windy City Bulls (CHI) | 18 | 14 | .563 | 5 |
| 8 | e – Lakeland Magic (ORL) | 18 | 14 | .563 | 5 |
| 9 | e – Motor City Cruise (DET) | 17 | 15 | .531 | 6 |
| 10 | e – Raptors 905 (TOR) | 16 | 16 | .500 | 7 |
| 11 | e – College Park Skyhawks (ATL) | 15 | 17 | .469 | 8 |
| 12 | e – Greensboro Swarm (CHA) | 11 | 21 | .344 | 12 |
| 13 | e – Wisconsin Herd (MIL) | 11 | 21 | .344 | 12 |
| 14 | e – Grand Rapids Gold (DEN) | 9 | 23 | .281 | 14 |
| 15 | e – Westchester Knicks (NYK) | 9 | 23 | .281 | 14 |

Source: GLeague.NBA.com
e – Eliminated; x – Qualified for playoffs; y – Clinched top seed

=== Western Conference ===
| Pos | Team | W | L | PCT | GB |
|---|---|---|---|---|---|
| 1 | y – Stockton Kings (SAC) | 25 | 7 | .781 | — |
| 2 | x – Memphis Hustle (MEM) | 23 | 9 | .719 | 2 |
| 3 | x – South Bay Lakers (LAL) | 21 | 11 | .656 | 4 |
| 4 | x – Salt Lake City Stars (UTA) | 20 | 12 | .625 | 5 |
| 5 | x – Sioux Falls Skyforce (MIA) | 20 | 12 | .625 | 5 |
| 6 | x – Rio Grande Valley Vipers (HOU) | 18 | 14 | .563 | 7 |
| 7 | e – Santa Cruz Warriors (GSW) | 18 | 14 | .563 | 7 |
| 8 | e – Capitanes de la Ciudad de México | 18 | 14 | .563 | 7 |
| 9 | e – Ontario Clippers (LAC) | 17 | 15 | .531 | 8 |
| 10 | e – Oklahoma City Blue (OKC) | 13 | 19 | .406 | 12 |
| 11 | e – NBA G League Ignite | 11 | 21 | .344 | 14 |
| 12 | e – Birmingham Squadron (NO) | 11 | 21 | .344 | 14 |
| 13 | e – Iowa Wolves (MIN) | 9 | 23 | .281 | 16 |
| 14 | e – Austin Spurs (SAS) | 8 | 24 | .250 | 17 |
| 15 | e – Texas Legends (DAL) | 7 | 25 | .219 | 18 |

Source: GLeague.NBA.com
e – Eliminated; x – Qualified for playoffs; y – Clinched top seed

=== Playoffs ===
Conference Quarterfinals | Conference Semifinals
1 | Long Island Nets | 111
5 | Cleveland Charge | 107
4 | Maine Celtics | 100
5 | Cleveland Charge | 113
Eastern Conference
3 | Capital City Go-Go | 101
6 | Fort Wayne Mad Ants | 87
2 | Delaware Blue Coats | 104
3 | Capital City Go-Go | 99
1 | Stockton Kings | 97
5 | Sioux Falls Skyforce | 98
4 | Salt Lake City Stars | 107
5 | Sioux Falls Skyforce | 115
Western Conference
3 | South Bay Lakers | 122
6 | Rio Grande Valley Vipers | 124
2 | Memphis Hustle | 108
6 | Rio Grande Valley Vipers | 110

Conference Finals
1 | Long Island Nets | 94
2 | Delaware Blue Coats | 108
5 | Sioux Falls Skyforce | 105
6 | Rio Grande Valley Vipers | 110

Finals; Best-of-three
E2 | Delaware Blue Coats | 2
W6 | Rio Grande Valley Vipers | 0

=== Finals boxscore ===
April 4, 2023
9:00 p.m. ET

Boxscore

Rio Grande Valley Vipers 120, Delaware Blue Coats 134
Scoring by quarter: 21–41, 36–33, 33–36, 24–30
| Pts: TyTy Washington Jr. 34; Rebs: TyTy Washington Jr. 11; Asts: TyTy Washington Jr. 8 | Pts: Jaden Springer 43; Rebs: Charlie Brown Jr. 15; Asts: Mac McClung 7 |

Chase Fieldhouse, Wilmington, Delaware
Attendance: 1,545
Referees:
- #34 Brent Haskill
- #73 Pat O'Connell
- #46 Intae Hwang
- #41 Tyler Mirkovich

April 6, 2023
8:30 p.m. ET

Boxscore

Delaware Blue Coats 114, Rio Grande Valley Vipers 110
Scoring by quarter: 28–26, 32–31, 30–17, 24–36
| Pts: Mac McClung 30; Rebs: Jaden Springer, Justin Smith, Louis King 9 each Asts: Mac McClung 8 | Pts: TyTy Washington Jr. 38; Rebs: Darius Days 15; Asts: TyTy Washington Jr. 5 |
Delaware wins series, 2–0

Bert Ogden Arena, Edinburg, Texas
Attendance: 6,117
Referees:
- #80 JD Ralls
- #77 Jenna Reneau
- #18 Isaac Barnett
- #63 Sha'Rae Mitchell

== 2023–24 ==
=== Finals boxscore ===
April 9, 2024
8:00 p.m. ET

Box Score

Oklahoma City Blue 86, Maine Celtics 106
Scoring by quarter: 14–33, 28–26, 19–25, 25–22
| Pts: Jaden Shackelford 21; Rebs: Olivier Sarr 13; Asts: Ousmane Dieng, Jaden Shackelford 4 | Pts: JD Davison 23; Rebs: Neemias Queta 13; Asts: JD Davison 12 |

Portland Exposition Building, Portland, Maine
Attendance: 2,417
Referees:
- #36 Tyler Ricks
- #77 Jenna Reneau
- #41 Tyler Mirkovich
- #34 Brent Haskill

April 11, 2024
8:00 p.m. ET

Box Score

Maine Celtics 89, Oklahoma City Blue 99
Scoring by quarter: 14–25, 32–30, 23–28, 20–16
| Pts: Drew Peterson 29; Rebs: Neemias Queta 13; Asts: JD Davison 12 | Pts: Lindy Waters III 27; Rebs: Olivier Sarr 9 Asts: Adam Flagler, Hunter Maldonado, Lindy Waters III 5 each |

Paycom Center, Oklahoma City, Oklahoma
Attendance: 6,883
Referees:
- #41 Tyler Mirkovich
- #80 JD Ralls
- #34 Brent Haskil
- #73 Pat O'Connell

April 15, 2024
9:00 p.m. ET

Boxscore

Oklahoma City Blue 117, Maine Celtics 100
Scoring by quarter: 29–22, 34–18, 29–27, 25–33
| Pts: Ousmane Dieng 25; Rebs: Olivier Sarr 13; Asts: Ousmane Dieng 4 | Pts: JD Davison 22; Rebs: Drew Peterson 8 Asts: JD Davison 10 |
Oklahoma City wins series, 2–1

Portland Exposition Building, Portland, Maine
Attendance: 2,417
Referees:
- #36 Tyler Ricks
- #77 Jenna Reneau
- #80 JD Ralls
- #73 Pat O'Connell

== 2024–25 ==
=== Finals boxscore ===
April 8, 2025
8:00 p.m. ET

Boxscore

Stockton Kings 118, Osceola Magic 129
Scoring by quarter: 30–32, 30–28, 27–38, 31–31
| Pts: Terry Taylor 28; Rebs: Skal Labissiere 10; Asts: Mason Jones 5 | Pts: Myron Gardner 30; Rebs: Alex Morales 11; Asts: Mac McClung, Alex Morales 7 |

Silver Spurs Arena, Kissimmee, Florida
Attendance: 1,724
Referees:
- #77 Jenna Reneau
- #45 Biniam Maru
- #73 Pat O'Connell
- #72 Marcy Williams

April 11, 2025
10:00 p.m. ET

Boxscore

Osceola Magic 126, Stockton Kings 144
Scoring by quarter: 32–41, 43–27, 29–42, 22–34
| Pts: Mac McClung 33; Rebs: Alex Morales 7 Asts: Mac McClung 8 | Pts: Mason Jones 27; Rebs: Brian Bowen II, Terry Taylor 10; Asts: Mason Jones 12 |

Adventist Health Arena, Stockton, California
Attendance: 4,194
Referees:
- #41 Tyler Mirkovich
- #34 Brent Haskill
- #45 Biniam Maru
- #72 Marcy Williams

April 14, 2025
8:00 p.m. ET

Stockton Kings 118, Osceola Magic 110
Scoring by quarter: 21–29, 28–26, 24–27, 45–28
| Pts: Dexter Dennis 23; Rebs: Isaac Jones 13; Asts: Mason Jones 13 | Pts: Ethan Thompson 28; Rebs: Myron Gardner 14; Asts: Jarrett Culver, Mac McClung 5 |
Stockton Wins Series, 2–1.

Silver Spurs Arena, Kissimmee, Florida
Attendance: 3,421
Referees:
- #77 Jenna Reneau
- #41 Tyler Mirkovich
- #34 Brent Haskill
- #73 Pat O'Connell

== 2025–26 ==
=== Finals boxscore ===
April 8, 2026
7:30 p.m. ET

Boxscore

Stockton Kings 107, Greensboro Swarm 111
Scoring by quarter: 37–38, 20–25, 27–27, 23–21
| Pts: DaQuan Jeffries 25; Rebs: Patrick Baldwin Jr., Dexter Dennis, Jon Elmore 7 Asts: DaQuan Jeffries 6 | Pts: Marcus Garrett 21; Rebs: Jonas Aidoo 14; Asts: Terrell Brown Jr., Liam McNeeley 2 |

Novant Health Fieldhouse, Greensboro, North Carolina
Attendance: 1,678
Referees:
- #7 Agon Abazi
- #34 Brent Haskill
- #72 Marcy Williams
- #79 Klajdi Mulla

April 10, 2026
10:00 p.m. ET

Boxscore

Greensboro Swarm 119, Stockton Kings 104
Scoring by quarter: 25–19, 37–31, 27–33, 30–21
| Pts: Tosan Evbuomwan 22; Rebs: Tidjane Salaün 10; Asts: Terrell Brown Jr. 10 | Pts: DaQuan Jeffries 27; Rebs: DaQuan Jeffries 10; Asts: Jon Elmore 7 |
Greensboro win series 2–0.

Adventist Health Arena, Stockton, California
Attendance: 4,020
Referees:
- #7 Agon Abazi
- #26 Nate Cearley
- #66 Chelisa Painter
- #5 Gina Catanzariti
