= Khalifa Koumadje =

Chadian basketball player

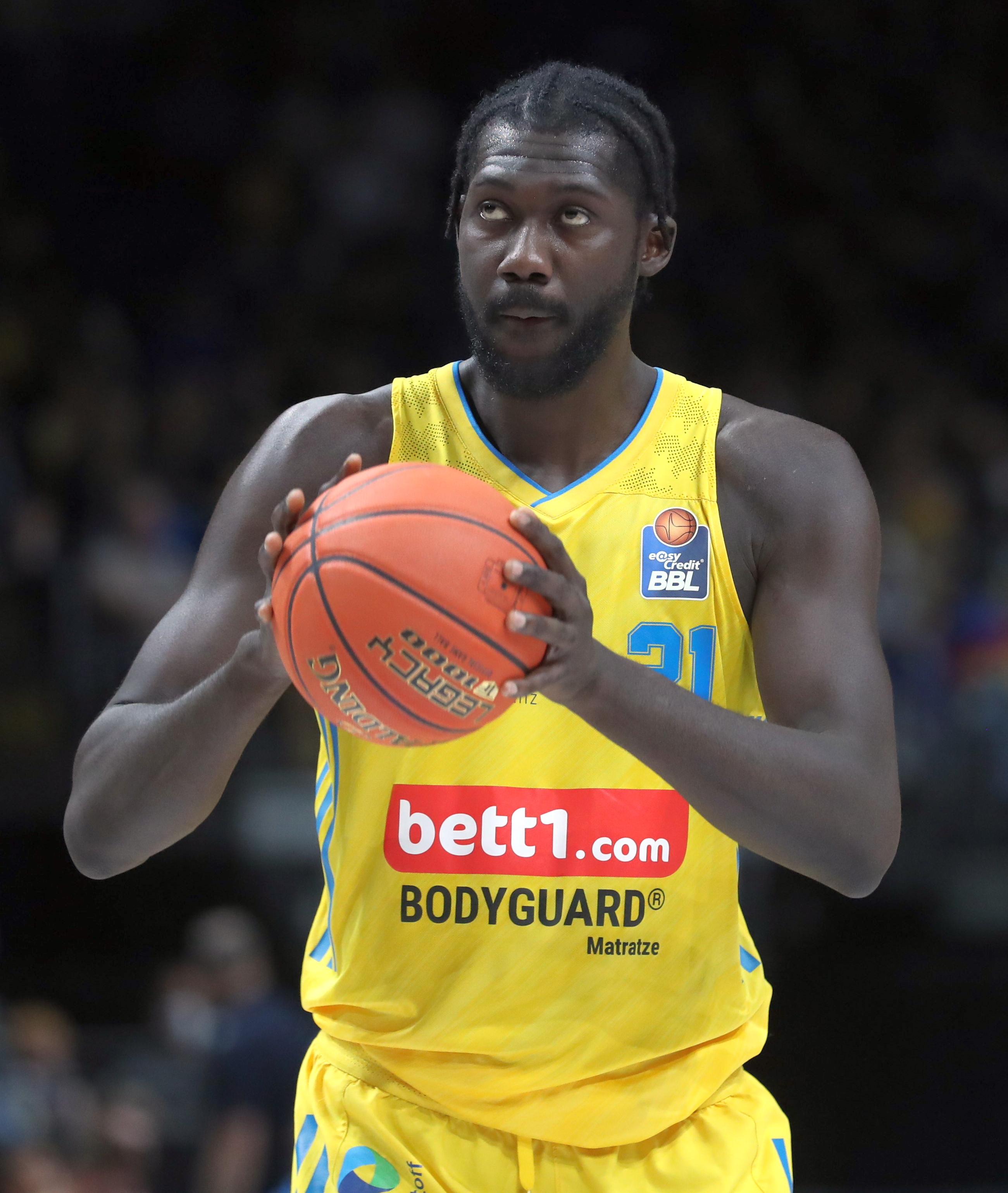
- Koumadje with Alba Berlin in 2022

No. 20 – Tianjin Pioneers
- Position: Center
- League: CBA

Personal information
- Born: July 7, 1996 (age 30) N'Djamena, Chad
- Listed height: 2.21 m (7 ft 3 in)
- Listed weight: 121 kg (267 lb)

Career information
- High school: Montverde Academy (Montverde, Florida)
- College: Florida State (2015–2019)
- NBA draft: 2019: undrafted
- Playing career: 2019–present

Career history
- 2019–2020: Delaware Blue Coats
- 2020: Movistar Estudiantes
- 2020–2021: Avtodor
- 2021–2024: Alba Berlin
- 2024–2025: Shandong Hi-Speed Kirin
- 2025–2026: Basket Zaragoza
- 2026–present: Tianjin Pioneers

Career highlights
- 2× German League champion (2021, 2022); German Cup winner (2022); NBA G League Defensive Player of the Year (2020); NBA G League All-Defensive Team (2020); NBA G League blocks leader (2020)
- Stats at Basketball Reference

Khalifa Koumadje (born Jean Marc Christ Koumadje, July 7, 1996) is a Chadian professional basketball player for the Tianjin Pioneers of the Chinese Basketball Association (CBA). He played college basketball for the Florida State Seminoles.

== Early life ==
Born in N'Djamena, Chad, Koumadje first picked up a basketball when he was 15, after previously playing soccer before he lost his speed because of his growth spurts. When he was 16, in 2013, his mother relocated 3,000 km to Senegal due to the political unrest in Chad. In Senegal, Koumadje met basketball recruiter Ibrahima N’Diaye, the brother of former NBA player Mamadou N'Diaye, who approached him to work out at the Flying Star Academy in Dakar. Six months later, Koumadje received the opportunity to receive a basketball scholarship in the United States.

Koumadje played high school basketball at the Montverde Academy in Montverde, Florida, where he was teammates with Ben Simmons.

== College career ==
Koumadje played college basketball at Florida State. During his senior season at FSU, Koumadje averaged 6.6 points per game, 5.6 rebounds per game, 1.4 blocks per game, and 15.5 minutes played per game.

== Professional career ==
=== Delaware Blue Coats (2019–2020) ===
After going undrafted in the 2019 NBA draft, he signed with the Philadelphia 76ers. He was cut during training camp and was added to the training camp roster and opening night roster of the Delaware Blue Coats, the NBA G League affiliate of the 76ers. Koumadje had 19 points, 10 rebounds, and five blocks in a 114–107 win against the Raptors 905 on December 14. On January 4, 2020, Koumadje recorded a triple-double in a 111–88 win over the Long Island Nets, posting 12 points, 16 rebounds and a franchise-record 12 blocks. In the last 10 games of the shortened 2019–20 G League season, Koumadje averaged 11.8 points, 12.8 rebounds, and 5.8 blocks per game, shooting 66% from the field. He was named NBA G League Defensive Player of the Year.

=== Movistar Estudiantes (2020) ===
On September 21, 2020, Movistar Estudiantes announced that they had signed Koumadje.

=== Avtodor Saratov (2020–2021) ===
On December 20, 2020, he signed with Avtodor of the VTB United League.

=== Alba Berlin (2021–2024) ===
On February 25, 2021, Alba Berlin of the German Basketball Bundesliga (BBL) and EuroLeague announced that they had signed with Koumadje until the end of 2022–23 season. In his first EuroLeague season, he averaged 5.9 points and 4.2 rebounds per game.

On July 26, 2023, he renewed his contract with the German club through 2026.

=== Shandong Hi-Speed Kirin (2024–2025) ===
In November 2024, Koumadje joined the Shandong Hi-Speed Kirin of the Chinese Basketball Association (CBA).

== Career statistics ==
Legend
| GP | Games played | GS | Games started | MPG | Minutes per game |
| FG% | Field-goal percentage | 3P% | 3-point field-goal percentage | FT% | Free-throw percentage |
| RPG | Rebounds per game | APG | Assists per game | SPG | Steals per game |
| BPG | Blocks per game | PPG | Points per game | PIR | Performance index rating |
| **Bold** | Career high |

=== EuroLeague ===
| Year | Team | GP | GS | MPG | FG% | 3P% | FT% | RPG | APG | SPG | BPG | PPG | PIR |
|---|---|---|---|---|---|---|---|---|---|---|---|---|---|
| 2020–21 | Alba Berlin | 4 | 1 | 11.8 | .700 | — | .000 | 3.3 | **.3** | — | **1.0** | 3.5 | 4.0 |
| 2021–22 | Alba Berlin | 21 | 4 | 12.4 | .704 | — | .658 | 4.3 | .0 | .1 | .6 | **6.0** | 8.7 |
| 2022–23 | Alba Berlin | **31** | **17** | 13.2 | **.707** | — | .537 | 3.8 | .2 | .3 | .6 | 4.0 | 5.9 |
| 2023–24 | Alba Berlin | 28 | 11 | **16.6** | .627 | — | **.682** | **5.4** | **.3** | **.4** | .9 | 5.6 | **9.0** |
| Career | | 84 | 33 | 14.1 | .679 | — | .611 | 4.4 | .2 | .3 | .9 | 5.8 | 8.2 |

=== Domestic leagues ===
| Year | Team | League | GP | MPG | FG% | 3P% | FT% | RPG | APG | SPG | BPG | PPG |
|---|---|---|---|---|---|---|---|---|---|---|---|---|
| 2019–20 | (United States) Delaware Blue Coats | G League | 33 | 26.4 | .635 | — | .679 | 11.0 | .8 | .6 | 4.1 | 11.3 |
| 2020–21 | (Spain) Estudiantes | ACB | 6 | 4.9 | .600 | — | .250 | 1.0 | — | — | .3 | 1.2 |
| 2020–21 | (Russia) Avtodor Saratov | VTBUL | 5 | 5.8 | .429 | — | — | 1.2 | — | .2 | — | 1.2 |
| 2020–21 | (Germany) Alba Berlin | BBL | 20 | 11.6 | .771 | — | .621 | 3.7 | .3 | .3 | .9 | 4.6 |
| 2021–22 | (Germany) Alba Berlin | BBL | 34 | 12.1 | .744 | — | .638 | 4.5 | .3 | .1 | .9 | 6.2 |
| 2022–23 | (Germany) Alba Berlin | BBL | 29 | 12.9 | .655 | — | .632 | 4.2 | .3 | .1 | .8 | 6.3 |
| 2023–24 | (Germany) Alba Berlin | BBL | 32 | 14.4 | .800 | — | .567 | 5.2 | .4 | .2 | .7 | 5.6 |

=== College ===
| Year | Team | GP | GS | MPG | FG% | 3P% | FT% | RPG | APG | SPG | BPG | PPG |
|---|---|---|---|---|---|---|---|---|---|---|---|---|
| 2015–16 | Florida State | 26 | 1 | 6.1 | .481 | — | .412 | 1.5 | .0 | — | .7 | 1.3 |
| 2016–17 | Florida State | 35 | 0 | 10.1 | **.654** | .000 | .480 | 1.9 | .1 | **.2** | 1.1 | 3.4 |
| 2017–18 | Florida State | 24 | 21 | **16.0** | .626 | — | **.583** | 4.1 | .1 | .1 | **1.5** | 6.5 |
| 2018–19 | Florida State | **37** | **37** | 15.5 | .627 | .000 | .582 | **5.6** | **.2** | **.2** | 1.4 | **6.6** |
| Career | | 122 | 59 | 12.1 | .622 | .000 | .541 | 3.3 | .1 | .1 | 1.2 | 4.5 |

== Personal life ==
In October 2023, Koumadje changed his first name to Khalifa, a name he was known by throughout his life.
