= Derrick Zimmerman =

American basketball player

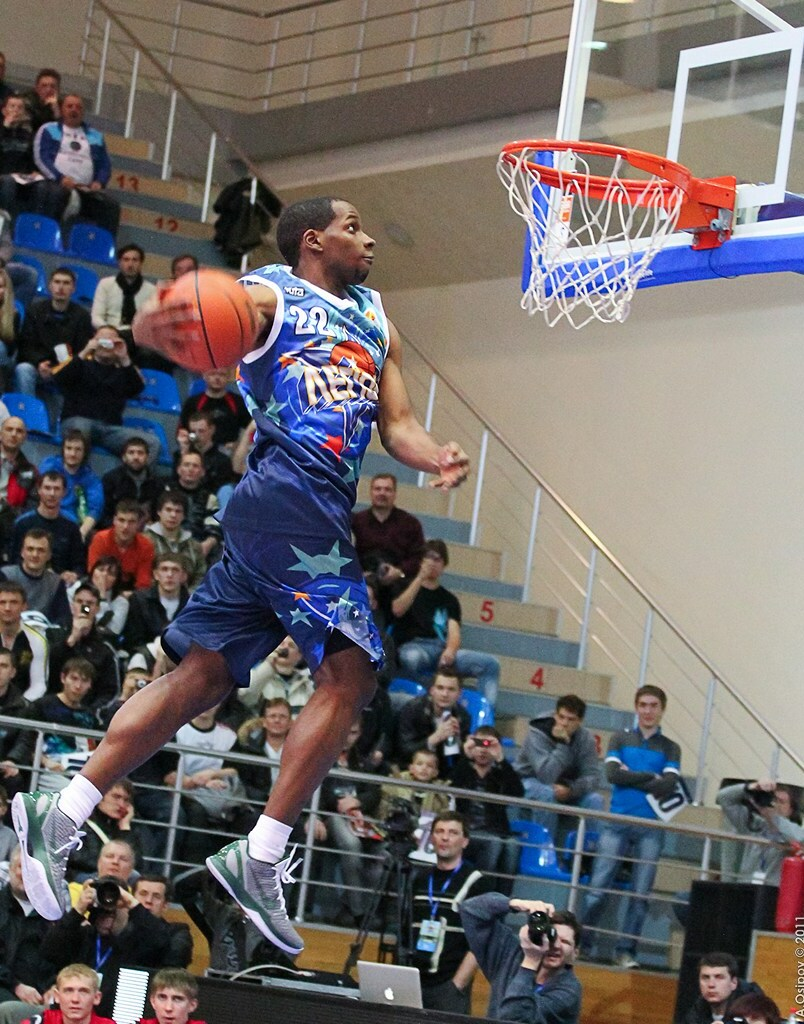
- Zimmerman in 2011

Carroll High School
- Title: Head coach
- Conference: LHSAA

Personal information
- Born: December 2, 1981 (age 44) Monroe, Louisiana, U.S.
- Listed height: 6 ft 3 in (1.91 m)
- Listed weight: 195 lb (88 kg)

Career information
- High school: Wossman (Monroe, Louisiana)
- College: Mississippi State (1999–2003)
- NBA draft: 2003: 2nd round, 40th overall pick
- Drafted by: Golden State Warriors
- Playing career: 2003–2014
- Position: Point guard
- Number: 2
- Coaching career: 2018–present

Career history

Playing
- 2003–2005: Columbus Riverdragons
- 2005–2006: Austin Toros
- 2006: New Jersey Nets
- 2006–2007: Brose Baskets
- 2007: Air Avellino
- 2007–2008: HKK Široki
- 2008–2010: Budivelnyk
- 2010–2011: Hoverla Ivano-Frankivsk
- 2011–2012: BC Kyiv
- 2012–2013: Dnipro-Azot
- 2013: Neckar Riesen Ludwigsburg
- 2014: Energa Czarni Słupsk

Coaching
- 2018–2020: Mississippi State (GA)
- 2021–2024: Louisiana (assistant)
- 2024–2025: Louisiana (interim)
- 2025–2026: Louisiana–Monroe (AHC)
- 2026-present: Carroll High School

Career highlights
- 2× NBDL/NBA D-League Defensive Player of the Year (2005, 2006); All-NBDL Second Team (2005)
- Stats at NBA.com
- Stats at Basketball Reference

Derrick Dewayne Zimmerman (born December 2, 1981) is an American basketball coach and former player. He is currently the associate head coach at the University of Louisiana-Monroe. Zimmarman played college basketball at Mississippi State University.

== College career ==
For the Mississippi State Bulldogs, he averaged 8.9 points, 5.5 assists, 4.2 rebounds, 1.9 steals and 0.8 blocks. He shot 15 of 52 three-pointers as a senior and 64.9% on free throws.

== Professional career ==
He was selected 40th overall in the 2003 NBA draft by the Golden State Warriors, and played two games with the NBA's New Jersey Nets during the 2005–06 season.

Those two games ended up being Zimmerman's only playing time in the NBA. His 2nd game ever (also his final NBA game ever) was played on April 19, 2006, in a 83–90 loss to the New York Knicks where he recorded 4 points, 5 assists and 1 rebound.

He played in the NBA D-League for the Columbus Riverdragons (2004–05) and Austin Toros (2005–06). Derrick was named the NBDL's Defensive Player of the Year for two consecutive seasons (Austin 2005–06, Columbus 2004–05). In December 2006, he signed a one-month contract with Brose Baskets of the German Basketball Bundesliga. After his contract expired, he signed with Italian team Air Avellino until the end of the season.

In the summer of 2008, he signed with the Ukrainian club Budivelnyk Kyiv. He stayed in Ukraine till 2013, and later played with Hoverla Ivano-Frankivsk, Kyiv and Dnipro-Azot.

In February 2013, Zimmerman moved to Germany and signed with Neckar Riesen Ludwigsburg for the rest of the season. In January 2014, after a couple months without a club, he signed with Energa Czarni Słupsk of Poland for the rest of the season.

== Coaching ==
=== Mississippi State (2018-2020) ===
After his playing career, Zimmerman returned to his alma mater, Mississippi State, in 2018, serving two seasons as a graduate assistant and one as director of scouting and analytics.

=== Louisiana (2021-2025) ===
In 2021, Louisiana head coach Bob Marlin hired Zimmerman as an assistant coach. On December 19, 2024, amid a 3–9 start to the season, Louisiana fired Marlin and named Zimmerman the interim head coach for the remainder of the 2024-25 season.

=== Louisiana-Monroe (2025-present) ===
In April 2025, Zimmerman was hired as the associate head coach for the University of Louisiana-Monroe.

== Head coaching record ==
=== College ===
Record table
Season	Team	Overall	Conference	Standing	Postseason
Louisiana Ragin' Cajuns (Sun Belt Conference) (2024–2025)
2024–25	Louisiana	9–12	7–10	T–8th	
Louisiana:		9–12 (.429)	7–10 (.412)		
Total:		9–12 (.429)			
National champion Postseason invitational champion Conference regular season champion Conference regular season and conference tournament champion Division regular season champion Division regular season and conference tournament champion Conference tournament champion
