= Jeff Myers (basketball) =

American basketball player (born 1974)

Personal information
- Born: March 24, 1974 (age 52) Philadelphia, Pennsylvania, U.S.
- Listed height: 6 ft 2 in (1.88 m)
- Listed weight: 196 lb (89 kg)

Career information
- High school: South Philadelphia (Philadelphia, Pennsylvania)
- College: St. Francis Brooklyn (1992–1993); Drexel (1994–1997)
- NBA draft: 1997: undrafted
- Playing career: 1997–2005
- Position: Guard

Career history
- 1997–1998: Philadelphia Power
- 1998–2001: Connecticut Pride
- 2001–2002: Greenville Groove
- 2002: Adirondack Wildcats
- 2003: Greenville Groove
- 2003–2005: Columbus Riverdragons

Career highlights
- NBA D-League Defensive Player of the Year (2002)

Jeff Myers (born March 24, 1974) is an American former basketball player. During college, Myers primarily played for the Drexel Dragons men's basketball between 1994 and 1997. After graduation, he played in the United States Basketball League and the Continental Basketball Association before joining the National Basketball Development League. With the NBDL, Myers played for the Greenville Groove from 2001 to 2003 and the Columbus Riverdragons from 2003 to 2005. While with the Groove, he won the first ever NBA G League Defensive Player of the Year Award in 2002.

== Early life and education ==
Myers was born on March 24, 1974, in Philadelphia, Pennsylvania. For high school, he went to South Philadelphia High School. In 1997, he graduated from Drexel University with a degree in accounting.

== Career ==
Myers began his basketball career with the St. Francis Brooklyn Terriers men's basketball team from 1992 to 1993. With the Terriers, Myers made 103 field goals and 5 three-pointers. The following season, Myers joined the Drexel Dragons men's basketball team in 1994 and remained with the team until 1997. With the Dragons, Myers scored 316 field goals and 139 three-pointers with a team total of 1430 points.

After graduation, Myers joined the United States Basketball League with the Philadelphia Power in 1997. After the team was renamed the Camden Power in 1998, Myers stayed with the team before moving to the Continental Basketball Association. In the CBA, he played for the Connecticut Pride from 1998 to 1999. When the Pride moved to the International Basketball League in 2000, he remained with the team from 2000 to 2001.

In 2001, Myers was picked by the Greenville Groove in the ninth round of the 2001 National Basketball Development League draft. With the Groove, he was a winning member of the 2002 NBDL championship. After the NBDL Championship, Myers went back to the USBL to play with the Adirondack Wildcats for the summer of 2002. Afterwards, Myers left the Wildcats and returned to the Groove in the beginning of 2003. He went to the Columbus Riverdragons for the 2003–04 season and remained with the team until 2005. He ended his NBDL career with 392 field goals, 68 three-pointers and 1355 points.

== Awards ==
Myers won the first ever NBA G League Defensive Player of the Year Award in 2002.
