= DeAndre Liggins =

American basketball player (born 1988)

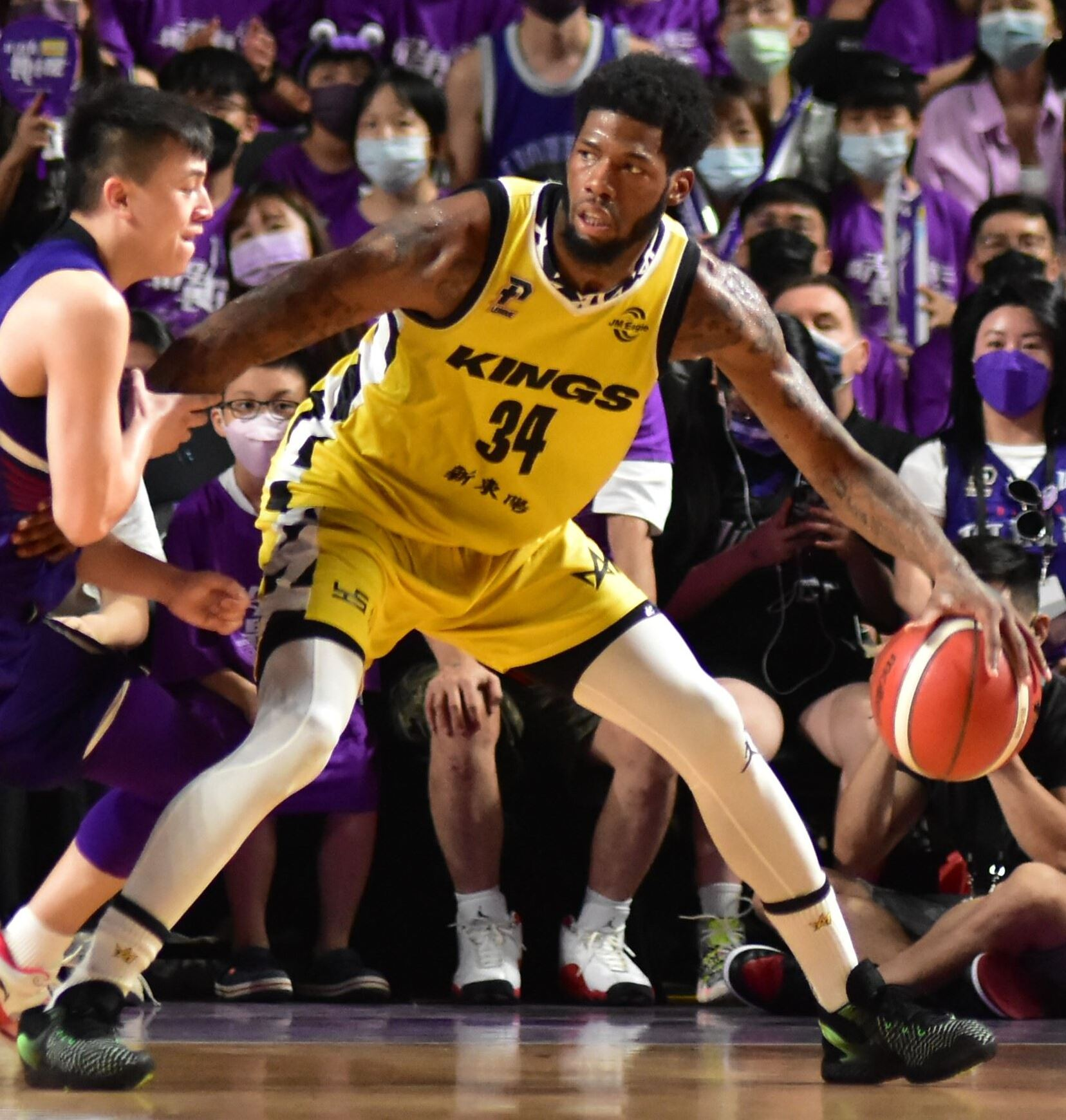
- Liggins with the New Taipei Kings in 2022

No. 34 – Dijlah Al-Jamiea
- Position: Shooting guard / small forward
- League: Iraqi Basketball Premier League

Personal information
- Born: March 31, 1988 (age 38) Chicago, Illinois, U.S.
- Listed height: 6 ft 6 in (1.98 m)
- Listed weight: 209 lb (95 kg)

Career information
- High school: George Washington (Chicago, Illinois); Findlay Prep (Henderson, Nevada)
- College: Kentucky (2008–2011)
- NBA draft: 2011: 2nd round, 53rd overall pick
- Drafted by: Orlando Magic
- Playing career: 2011–present

Career history
- 2011–2012: Orlando Magic
- 2012–2013: Oklahoma City Thunder
- 2012–2013: →Tulsa 66ers
- 2013–2014: Sioux Falls Skyforce
- 2014: Miami Heat
- 2014: →Sioux Falls Skyforce
- 2014–2015: Krasny Oktyabr
- 2015: Eisbären Bremerhaven
- 2015–2016: Sioux Falls Skyforce
- 2016–2017: Cleveland Cavaliers
- 2017: Dallas Mavericks
- 2017–2018: Milwaukee Bucks
- 2018: New Orleans Pelicans
- 2018–2019: Sioux Falls Skyforce
- 2019: Kolossos Rodou
- 2019: Fuenlabrada
- 2020–2021: London Lions
- 2021–2022: New Taipei Kings
- 2022–2024: Al-Ahli Jeddah
- 2024–present: Dijlah Al-Jamiea

Career highlights
- BBL Trophy winner (2021); BBL Trophy MVP (2021); BBL Team of the Year (2021); BBL Defensive Team of the Year (2021); NBA D-League champion (2016); BBL Trophy champion (2021); 2× NBA D-League Defensive Player of the Year (2014, 2016); 2× All-NBA D-League Second Team (2014, 2016); 2× NBA D-League All-Defensive First Team (2014, 2016); 2× NBA D-League All-Star (2014, 2016)
- Stats at NBA.com
- Stats at Basketball Reference

DeAndre Desmond Liggins (born March 31, 1988) is an American professional basketball player for Dijlah Al-Jamiea of the Iraqi Basketball Premier League. He played college basketball for Kentucky.

== High school career ==
Liggins attended George Washington High School in Chicago and transferred to Findlay Prep in Henderson, Nevada, for his senior season. Considered a four-star recruit by Rivals.com, Liggins was listed as the No. 6 point guard and the No. 28 player in the nation in 2008.

== College career ==
Liggins played three years at the University of Kentucky. He spent his first two years mostly coming off the bench, but in his junior year, coach John Calipari decided to start him. After his junior season, he elected to enter the 2011 NBA draft.

== Professional career ==
=== Orlando Magic (2011–2012) ===
On June 24, 2011, Liggins was selected with the 53rd overall pick in the 2011 NBA draft by the Orlando Magic. Liggins made his NBA debut for Orlando on February 20, 2012, in a road game against the Milwaukee Bucks where he recorded three points and two rebounds in 10 minutes on the court. In July 2012, he joined the Magic for the 2012 NBA Summer League.

=== Oklahoma City Thunder (2012–2013) ===
On September 12, 2012, Liggins signed with the Oklahoma City Thunder. During the 2012–13 season, he had multiple assignments with the Tulsa 66ers of the NBA Development League. On January 13, 2013, Liggins started his first NBA game for the Thunder against the Portland Trail Blazers in Portland. He recorded 11 points and nine rebounds as the Thunder defeated the Trail Blazers, 87–83. In July 2013, he joined the Thunder for the 2013 NBA Summer League. On September 6, 2013, Liggins was waived by the Thunder.

=== Sioux Falls Skyforce and Miami Heat (2013–2014) ===
In November 2013, Liggins was acquired by the Sioux Falls Skyforce. On February 3, 2014, he was named to the Futures All-Star roster for the 2014 NBA D-League All-Star Game.

On February 25, 2014, Liggins signed a 10-day contract with the Miami Heat. On March 8, 2014, he signed a second 10-day contract with the Heat. The next day, he was assigned to the Sioux Falls Skyforce. He was recalled a day later. On March 14, 2014, he was waived by the Heat. He managed only one game for the Heat, recording 2 points and 1 rebound. On March 18, 2014, he was re-acquired by the Skyforce. On April 21, he was named the 2014 D-League Defensive Player of the Year.

=== Russia and Germany (2014–2015) ===
In July 2014, Liggins joined the Detroit Pistons for the Orlando Summer League and the Los Angeles Clippers for the Las Vegas Summer League. On October 15, 2014, he signed with Krasny Oktyabr of Russia for the 2014–15 season. On January 20, 2015, he parted ways with Krasny Oktyabr. On February 27, 2015, he signed with Eisbären Bremerhaven of Germany for the rest of the season.

=== Second Sioux Falls Skyforce stint (2015–2016) ===
On November 2, 2015, Liggins was reacquired by the Sioux Falls Skyforce. On January 29, he was named in the East All-Star team for the 2016 NBA D-League All-Star Game, earning his second All-Star nod in three years. However, he was ruled out of the All-Star game due to a right plantar fascia injury suffered on January 9, and was replaced in the East team by Quinn Cook. On April 13, he earned D-League Defensive Player of the Year honors for the second time in three years. He helped the Skyforce finish with a D-League-best 40–10 record in 2015–16, and went on to help the team win the league championship with a 2–1 Finals series win over the Los Angeles D-Fenders. At the season's end, he was named to the All-NBA D-League Second Team and All-NBA D-League All-Defensive First Team for the second time in his career.

=== Cleveland Cavaliers (2016–2017) ===
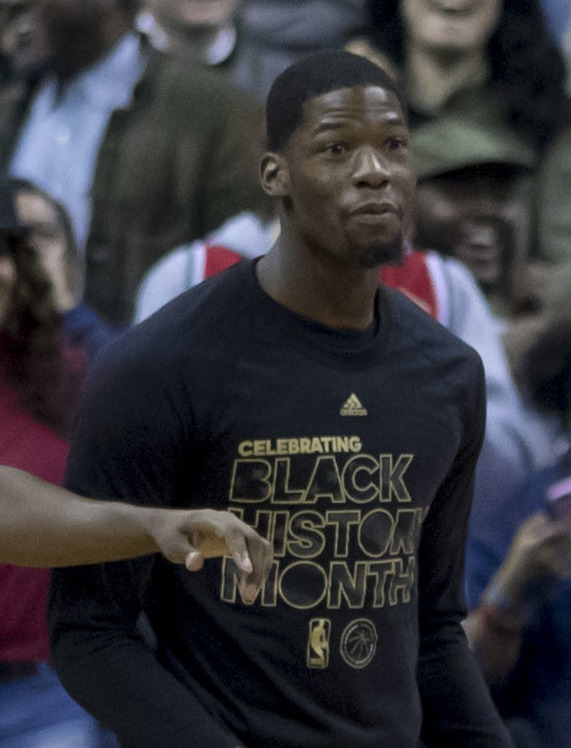
Liggins with the Cleveland Cavaliers in 2017

On September 26, 2016, Liggins signed with the Cleveland Cavaliers. He made his debut for the Cavaliers in the team's season opener on October 25, 2016, recording four points, three rebounds, three assists and one block in a 117–88 win over the New York Knicks. On April 9, 2017, he was waived by the Cavaliers.

=== Dallas Mavericks (2017) ===
On April 11, 2017, Liggins was claimed off waivers by the Dallas Mavericks.

=== 2017 off-season ===
On June 28, 2017, Liggins was traded to the Houston Rockets for cash considerations, then immediately traded to the Los Angeles Clippers as part of the trade that sent Chris Paul to Houston. On September 25, he was again traded – this time to the Atlanta Hawks for draft considerations. He was waived by the Hawks within a few hours of the transaction. On October 10, 2017, Liggins signed with the Miami Heat. He was waived four days later after appearing in one preseason game.

=== Milwaukee Bucks (2017–2018) ===
On October 16, 2017, Liggins was claimed off waivers by the Milwaukee Bucks. On January 7, 2018, he was waived by the Bucks.

=== New Orleans Pelicans (2018) ===
On January 10, 2018, Liggins signed a 10-day contract with the New Orleans Pelicans. On January 20, 2018, he signed a second 10-day contract with the Pelicans. On February 5, 2018, he signed a two-year deal with the Pelicans. Four days later, in a 100–82 loss to the Philadelphia 76ers, Liggins made his first start of the season, but failed to score in 19 minutes. On August 31, 2018, he was waived by the Pelicans.

=== Third Sioux Falls Skyforce stint (2018–2019) ===
On October 7, 2018, Liggins signed with the Miami Heat. He was waived by the Heat on October 11 after appearing in one preseason game. Liggins was subsequently added to the roster of the Sioux Falls Skyforce.

=== Kolossos Rodou (2019) ===
On March 23, 2019, Liggins signed with Kolossos Rodou of the Greek Basket League for the rest of the season.

=== Fuenlabrada (2019) ===
On August 5, 2019, Liggins signed a one-year deal with Spanish club Montakit Fuenlabrada. He averaged 2.8 points, 3.6 rebounds and 2.0 assists per game.

=== London Lions (2020–2021) ===
On July 22, 2020, Liggins signed with London Lions of the British Basketball League (BBL). Liggins averaged 14.4 points, 6.9 assists and 5.4 rebounds per game during the 2020–21 season.

=== New Taipei Kings (2021–2022) ===
On December 3, 2021, Liggins signed with New Taipei Kings of the Taiwanese P. League+.

== Career statistics ==
Legend
GP	Games played	GS	Games started	MPG	Minutes per game
FG%	Field goal percentage	3P%	3-point field goal percentage	FT%	Free throw percentage
RPG	Rebounds per game	APG	Assists per game	SPG	Steals per game
BPG	Blocks per game	PPG	Points per game	**Bold**	Career high

=== NBA ===
==== Regular season ====
Year	Team	GP	GS	MPG	FG%	3P%	FT%	RPG	APG	SPG	BPG	PPG
2011–12	Orlando	17	0	6.8	.480	.000	.474	.9	.3	.4	.0	1.9
2012–13	Oklahoma City	39	1	7.4	.447	.368	.500	1.4	.4	.5	.1	1.5
2013–14	Miami	1	0	1.0	**1.000**	.000	—	1.0	.0	.0	.0	2.0
2016–17	Cleveland	**61**	**19**	12.3	.382	.378	.622	1.7	**.9**	.7	.2	2.4
2016–17	Dallas	1	0	**25.0**	.500	.000	**.667**	**7.0**	.0	**2.0**	.0	**8.0**
2017–18	Milwaukee	31	1	15.5	.338	.306	.400	1.6	**.9**	.9	**.3**	1.8
2017–18	New Orleans	27	3	9.0	.439	**.471**	—	1.0	.8	.4	.1	1.6
Career		177	24	10.8	.402	.352	.549	1.4	.7	.6	.2	2.0

==== Playoffs ====
Year	Team	GP	GS	MPG	FG%	3P%	FT%	RPG	APG	SPG	BPG	PPG
2013	Oklahoma City	**8**	0	**8.5**	**.333**	**.200**	.250	**1.8**	**.5**	**.1**	**.1**	**1.0**
2018	New Orleans	3	0	4.7	.000	—	**.500**	.3	.0	.0	.0	.3
Career		11	0	7.5	.300	.200	.333	1.4	.4	.1	.1	.8

=== College ===
Year	Team	GP	GS	MPG	FG%	3P%	FT%	RPG	APG	SPG	BPG	PPG
2008–09	Kentucky	33	—	—	.362	.235	**.673**	2.3	**2.8**	.7	.4	4.2
2009–10	Kentucky	29	—	15.3	.419	.318	.590	2.3	.8	.7	.3	3.8
2010–11	Kentucky	**38**	—	**31.6**	**.424**	**.391**	.648	**4.0**	2.5	**1.2**	**.7**	**8.6**
Career		100	—	24.6	.407	.332	.643	3.0	2.1	.9	.5	5.8
