= NBA Development League All-Star Game Most Valuable Player Award =

The NBA D-League All-Star Game Most Valuable Player (MVP) was an annual NBA Development League (D-League) award given since the 2006–07 season to the 2016–17 season to the player voted best of the annual All-Star Game. The inaugural D-League All-Star Game was held in February 2007, and the inaugural All-Star Game MVP was Fort Worth Flyers forward Pops Mensah-Bonsu of the East team. By position, guards dominated the award with five winners, followed by forwards and centers with three each.

In 2018, the All-Star was replaced by the International Challenge and the Midseason All-NBA G League Team, and thus the All-Star Game MVP Award was retired.

== Winners ==
†	Denotes the year two MVPs were named.

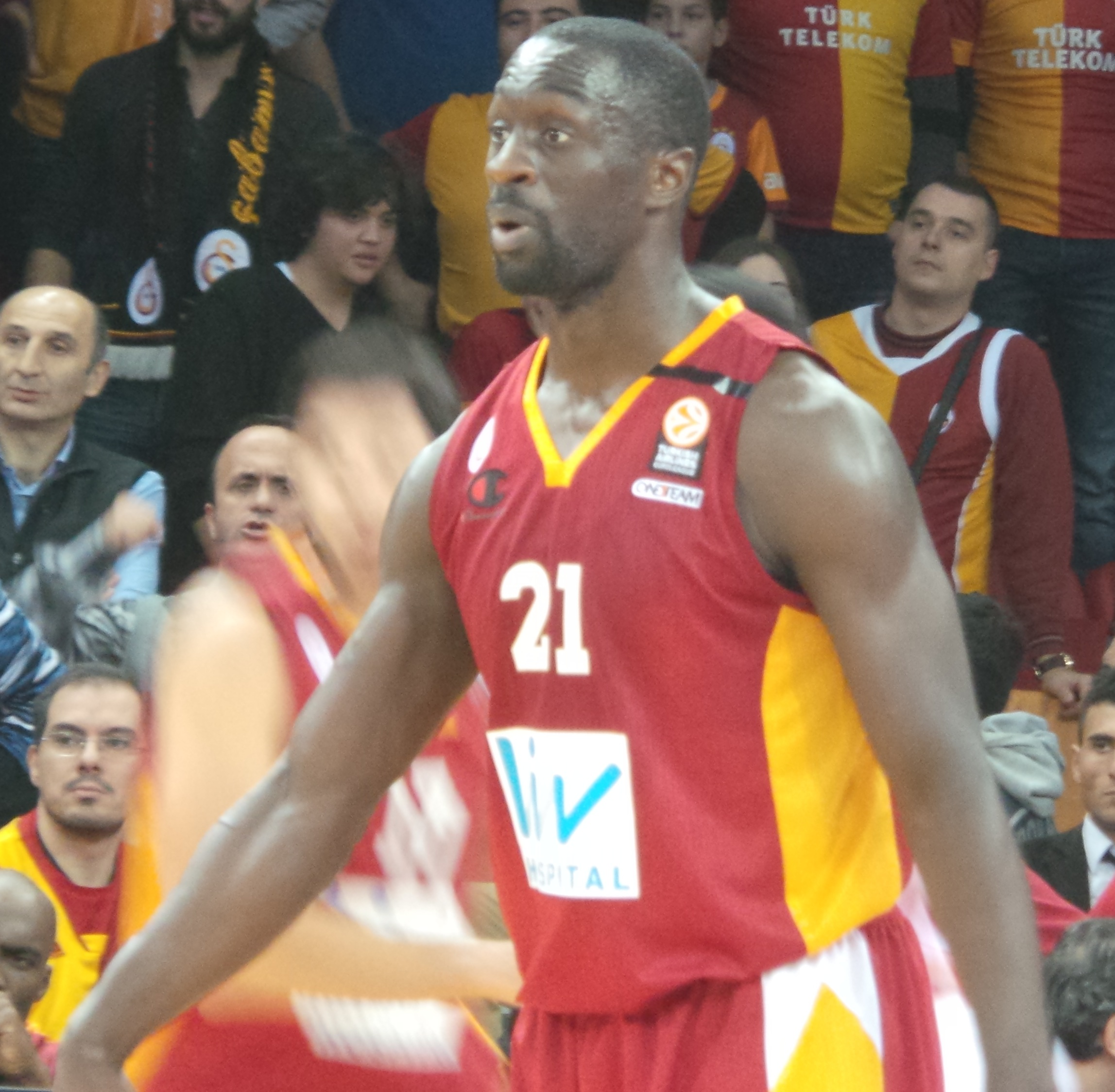
Pops Mensah-Bonsu was the inaugural winner of the award.

Season	Player	Position	Nationality	Team
2006–07	Pops Mensah-Bonsu	Forward	United Kingdom	Fort Worth Flyers
2007–08	Jeremy Richardson	Forward	United States	Fort Wayne Mad Ants (1)
2008–09^{†}	Blake Ahearn	Guard	United States	Dakota Wizards
2008–09^{†}	Courtney Sims	Center	United States	Iowa Energy (1)
2009–10	Brian Butch	Center	United States	Bakersfield Jam
2010–11	Courtney Sims	Center	United States	Iowa Energy (2)
2011–12	Gerald Green	Guard	United States	Los Angeles D-Fenders
2012–13	Travis Leslie	Guard	United States	Santa Cruz Warriors
2013–14	Robert Covington	Forward	United States	Rio Grande Valley Vipers
2014–15	Andre Emmett	Guard	United States	Fort Wayne Mad Ants (2)
2015–16	Jimmer Fredette	Guard	United States	Westchester Knicks
2016–17	Quinn Cook	Guard	United States	Canton Charge

== See also ==
- NBA G League Most Valuable Player Award
- NBA All-Star Game Kobe Bryant Most Valuable Player Award
