= NBA Development League All-Star Game =

Basketball all-star game

The NBA D-League All-Star Game was an annual exhibition basketball game held by the NBA Development League (D-League). The D-League was founded in 2001 as the National Basketball Development League (NBDL) and later as the NBA Development League. The league, now known as the NBA G League, serves as the National Basketball Association's official minor league basketball organization.

The game was first held during the 2006–07 season as part of the NBA All-Star Weekend. The D-League All-Star Game was played on Saturday in the same host city as the NBA All-Star Game. However, the game was not held in the same arena as all the other All-Star Saturday events. Instead, it was held on the NBA Jam Session's practice court.

In addition to the All-Star Game, the D-League also held the D-League Dream Factory Friday Night, an event modeled after the NBA All-Star Saturday Night. The event included popular competitions from the All-Star Saturday Night, such as the slam dunk contest and the three-point shootout. The Dream Factory Friday Night was first held during the second D-League All-Star Game in 2008.

In 2018, the All-Star Game was replaced by the NBA G League International Challenge, and the league's top players were instead named to its Midseason All-NBA G League Team.

== All-Star Game ==
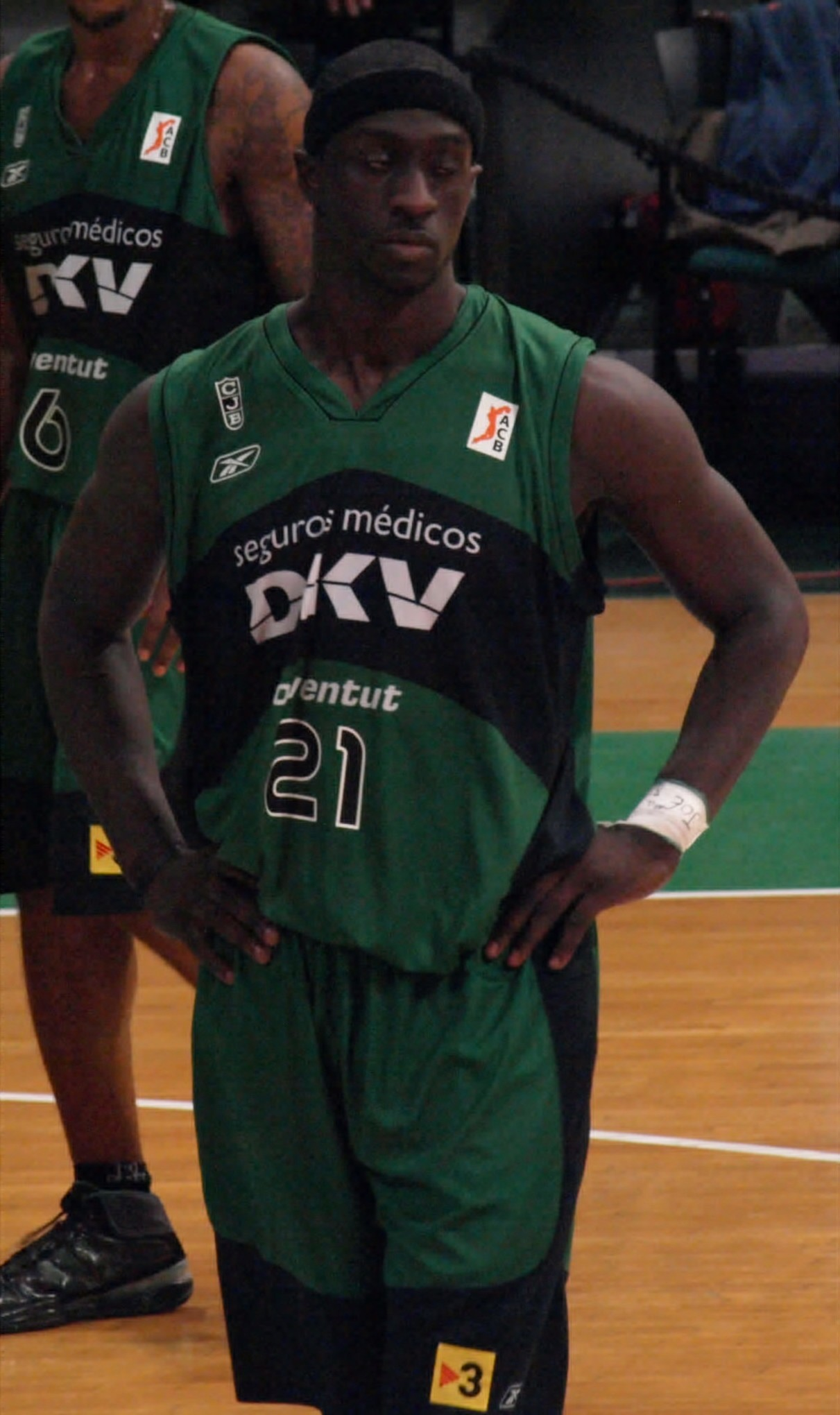
Pops Mensah-Bonsu won the inaugural D-League All-Star Game Most Valuable Player Award.

In the D-League All-Star Game, twenty of the league's top players were selected to the All-Star roster by a combination of fan balloting on the official league website and voting by the head coaches of the teams. NBA players assigned to D-League teams were eligible to be selected. Players selected by coaches and fans must have been on an active roster of a D-League team during the All-Star Weekend. If a player was unable to participate because of injury, a recall by his NBA team, or a call-up by an NBA team, a replacement player was named. The starting lineups were picked by the head coaches. The coaches for the All-Star game were the head coaches of the teams with the best winning percentage in the league through the three weeks before the All-Star game. The first two games were played in four quarters of 12 minutes, similar to a regular D-League game. However, the next two games were played in two 20-minute halves, similar to a college basketball game and the NBA All-Star Rookie Challenge.

The inaugural D-League All-Star Game was held in Las Vegas, Nevada during the 2007 NBA All-Star Weekend. The players were divided into the Eastern Division and the Western Division. The East won by 14 points and Pops Mensah-Bonsu was named as the All-Star Game Most Valuable Player. In the second and third All-Star Game, the players were divided into the Blue Team and the Red Team since there were three divisions in the D-League at the time. The Blue Team won the 2008 game, while the Red Team won in 2009. Jeremy Richardson won the 2008 All-Star Game MVP award and two players, Blake Ahearn and Courtney Sims, were jointly named as the MVP of the 2009 game. In 2010, the players were divided into the Eastern Conference and the Western Conference after the league switched back into two conferences. The West won the game, led by Brian Butch who won the 2010 All-Star Game MVP award.

In 2018, the NBA G League International Challenge replaced the traditional All-Star Game. The International Challenge matched select American G League players against the Mexico national basketball team. The U.S. team, chosen by a USA Basketball committee, was also expected to compete in the 2019 Americas qualifiers for the FIBA Basketball World Cup. In lieu of the All-Star Game, the league instead named Midseason All-NBA G League Teams for each conference.

=== Results ===
Year	Result	Host arena	Host city	Most Valuable Player(s)
2007	East 114, West 100	Mandalay Bay Resort and Casino	Las Vegas	(United Kingdom) Pops Mensah-Bonsu, East–Fort Worth Flyers^{A}
2008	Blue 117, Red 99	Ernest N. Morial Convention Center	New Orleans	(United States) Jeremy Richardson, Blue–Fort Wayne Mad Ants
2009	Red 113, Blue 103	Phoenix Convention Center	Phoenix	(United States) Blake Ahearn, Red–Dakota Wizards and (United States) Courtney Sims, Red–Idaho Stampede
2010	West 98, East 81	Dallas Convention Center	Dallas	(United States) Brian Butch, West–Bakersfield Jam
2011	East 115, West 108	Los Angeles Convention Center	Los Angeles	(United States) Courtney Sims (2), East–Iowa Energy
2012	West 135, East 132	Orange County Convention Center	Orlando	(United States) Gerald Green, West–Los Angeles D-Fenders
2013	Prospects 139, Futures 125	Sprint Arena	Houston	(United States) Travis Leslie, Prospects–Santa Cruz Warriors
2014	Prospects 145, Futures 142	Ernest N. Morial Convention Center	New Orleans	(United States) Robert Covington, Prospects–Rio Grande Valley Vipers
2015	Futures 129, Prospects 94	Barclays Center	Brooklyn	(United States) Andre Emmett, Futures–Fort Wayne Mad Ants (2)
2016	East 128, West 124	Ricoh Coliseum	Toronto	(United States) Jimmer Fredette, East–Westchester Knicks
2017	East 105, West 100	Mercedes-Benz Superdome	New Orleans	(United States) Quinn Cook, East-Canton Charge

^A On assignment from the Dallas Mavericks

== Dream Factory ==
The D-League Dream Factory was a series of basketball skills competitions modeled after the NBA All-Star Saturday Night. The event took place during the NBA All-Star Weekend and was held on the NBA Jam Session's practice court. The league first hosted the event during the 2008 NBA All-Star Weekend. The final event included the slam dunk contest, the three-point shootout and the shooting stars competition, all of which were also annual competitions in the NBA All-Star Saturday Night at the time. The H.O.R.S.E competition was discontinued after 2009 and the hot-shot competition was discontinued after 2008.

=== Slam Dunk Contest ===
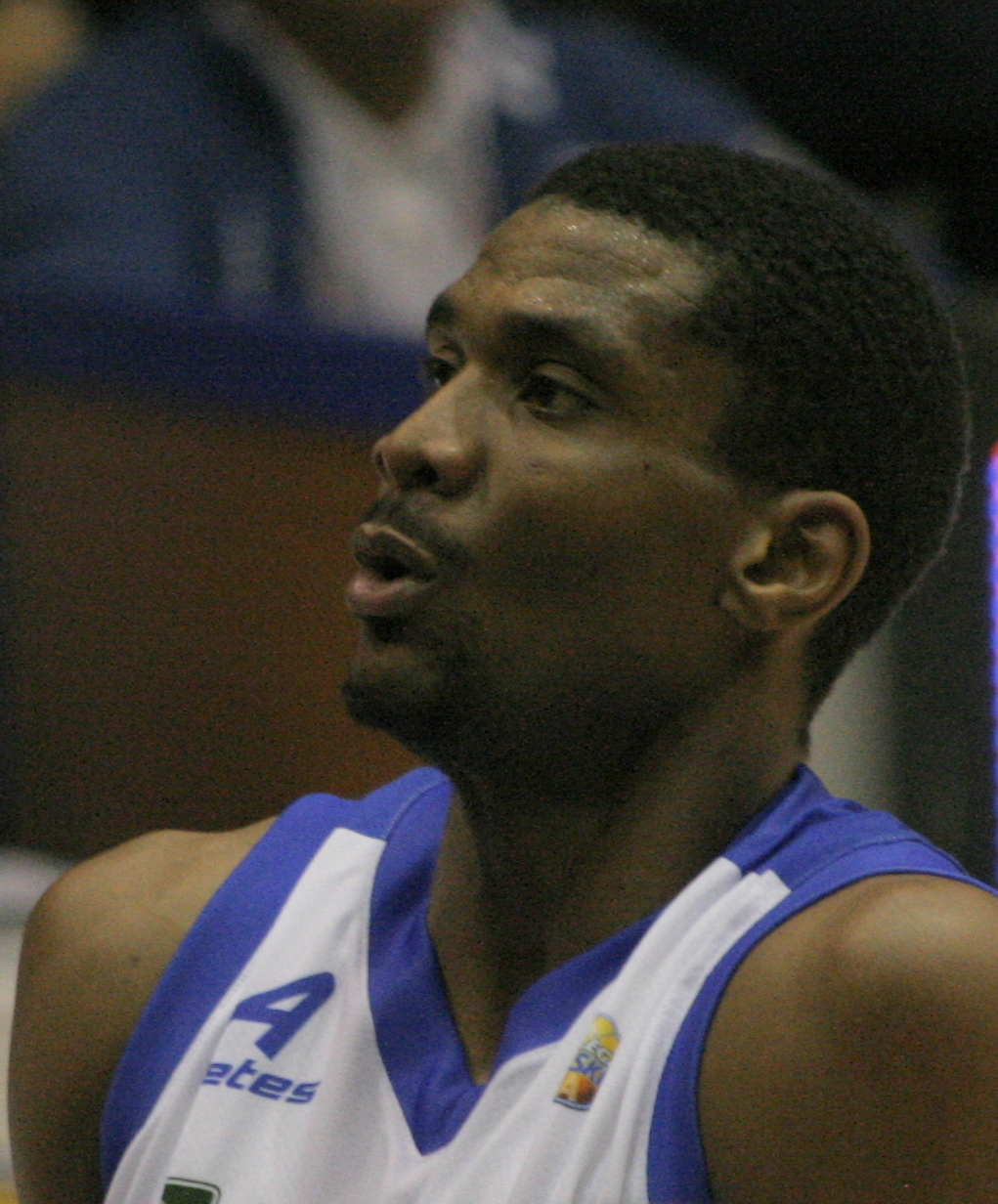
James White won the Slam Dunk Contest in 2009.

The slam dunk contest showcased a player's skill in making a slam dunk. The contest was contested by four players. In the first round, each contestant performed two dunks. Two contestants with the highest score from those dunks advanced to the final round, where they had to perform two more dunks each to determine the dunk champion.

Year	Winner
2008	(United States) Brent Petway, Idaho Stampede
2009	(United States) James White, Anaheim Arsenal
2010	(United States) (Jordan) Dar Tucker, Los Angeles D-Fenders
2011	(United States) (Jordan) Dar Tucker (2), New Mexico Thunderbirds
2012	(United States) L. D. Williams, Springfield Armor
2013	(United States) Tony Mitchell, Fort Wayne Mad Ants
2014	(United States) Tony Mitchell (2), Fort Wayne Mad Ants (2)
2015	(United States) Jarvis Threatt, Maine Red Claws
2016	(United States) John Jordan, Raptors 905
2017	(United States) Troy Williams, Iowa Energy
2018	(United States) DeQuan Jones, Fort Wayne Mad Ants (3)
2025	(United States) Logan Johnson, Oklahoma City Blue

=== Three-Point Shootout ===
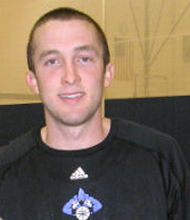
Blake Ahearn won the Three-Point Shootout in 2009.

In the three-point shootout, four contestants attempted to make as many three-point field goals as possible from five shooting stations behind the three-point arc in one minute. Players began shooting from one corner of the court, and moved from station to station along the three-point arc until they reached the other corner. Each of the first four stations had four standard balls, worth one point each, and one specially-colored "money ball", worth two points. The fifth shooting station consisted of five two-point money balls. Two contestants with the highest score advanced to the final round, where they re-attempted the three-point shots again from the five shooting stations.

Year	Winner
2008	(United States) Adam Harrington, Tulsa 66ers
2009	(United States) Blake Ahearn, Dakota Wizards
2010	(United States) Andre Ingram, Utah Flash
2011	(United States) Booker Woodfox, Texas Legends
2012	(United States) Booker Woodfox (2), Texas Legends (2)
2013	(United States) Marcus Landry, Reno Bighorns
2014	(United States) E. J. Singler, Idaho Stampede
2015	(United States) Jarell Eddie, Austin Spurs
2016	(United States) Andre Ingram (2), Los Angeles D-Fenders
2017	(United States) Scott Wood, Santa Cruz Warriors

=== Shooting Stars Competition ===
The Shooting Stars Competition was competed by four teams of three players each. In this competition, each team needed to make six shots from six shooting locations of increasing difficulties. Each team selected a specific player rotation to follow throughout the competition. Each shot must have been made before the next player began shooting in succession. The teams had two minutes to complete the course and the team who made all six shots with the fastest time wins the competition.

Year	Winners
2010	(United States) Pat Carroll, Iowa Energy (United States) Trey Gilder, Maine Red Claws (United States) Carlos Powell, Albuquerque Thunderbirds
2011	(United States) Shane Edwards, New Mexico Thunderbirds (United States) Orien Greene, Utah Flash (United States) Jeremy Wise, Bakersfield Jam
2012	(United States) Marqus Blakely, Sioux Falls Skyforce (United States) Cameron Jones, Fort Wayne Mad Ants (United States) Jerry Smith, Springfield Armor

=== H–O–R–S–E Competition ===
The objective of the H.O.R.S.E competition was to accrue as few of the five letters as possible. A player was given a letter every time they failed to duplicate the shot of another player. Each player was given 24 seconds to make or duplicate the shot (dunking was prohibited). Each player who failed to duplicate five shots was eliminated from the competition. The competition was contested by four players. The competition was discontinued after the 2009 event.

Year	Winner
(United States) 2008	Lance Allred, Idaho Stampede
(United States) 2009	(United States) Will Conroy, Albuquerque Thunderbirds

=== Hot-Shot Competition ===
In the Hot-Shot competition, four teams of a D-League player and a D-League fan had to score as many points as possible from the four shooting spots in one minute. The fan was allowed to attempt the one-point layup, while the player was allowed to attempt from any shooting spots, a one-point layup, a two-point free throw, a three-point shot from behind the arc, and a five-point half court shot. Two teams competed simultaneously at each end of the court and the winners advanced to the final round. The fan from the winning team had an opportunity to be a judge in the Slam Dunk Competition. The event was discontinued after the inaugural event in 2008.

Year	Winner
2008	(United States) Carlos Powell, Dakota Wizards

== Next Up Game ==
In the 2022–23 season, the G League introduced the Next Up Game, consisting of 24 players who were voted in by fans. Iowa Wolves forward Luka Garza and NBA G League Ignite guard Scoot Henderson were voted in as the captains, with each of the players selecting 12-man rosters consisting of themselves and eleven others during a draft. Salt Lake City Stars head coach Scott Morrison was chosen as the coach of Team Scoot, and Ontario Clippers head coach Paul Hewitt was chosen as the coach of Team Luka.
