= NBA All-Star Weekend =

American weekend basketball festival

The National Basketball Association All-Star weekend is a weekend festival held every February during the middle of the NBA regular season that consists of a variety of basketball events, exhibitions and performances culminating in the NBA All-Star Game held on Sunday night. No regular season games are held during this period, which is also known as the All-Star break. It is right after the trade deadline.

== The All-Star Game ==
The All-Star Game, held on Sunday, is the main event of the weekend. The game showcases a mix of the league's star players, who are drafted by the two players with the most votes. Each team consists of 12 players, making it 24 in total. It is the featured event of NBA All-Star weekend. NBA All-Star weekend is a three-day event which goes from Friday to Sunday. The All-Star Game was first played at the Boston Garden on March 2, 1951. In 2024, the game will be played in Indianapolis. Featuring the leagues greatest stars, including Kevin Durant, Stephen Curry and LeBron James. Giannis Antetokounmpo is representing the Eastern Conference. In 2024, a new event was featured, called the Steph versus Sabrina (NBA vs WNBA). These two are regarded as the best shooters in their leagues. A three-point contest was held to decide who is the greatest shooter, and the result was Stephen Curry beat Sabrina Ionescu by a score of 29–26.

The starting lineup for each squad is selected by a combination of fan, player, and media voting, while the reserves are chosen by a vote among the head coaches from each squad's respective conference. Coaches are not allowed to vote for their own players. If a selected player is injured and cannot participate, the NBA commissioner selects a replacement. The vote leaders for each conferences are assigned as captains and can choose from a pool of players named as all-stars to form their teams. The newly formed teams will also play for a charity of choice to help the games remain competitive. On January 25, 2018, LeBron James and Stephen Curry became the first players to form their own teams according to the new selection format for the 2018 All-Star Game.

== Events of All-Star weekend ==
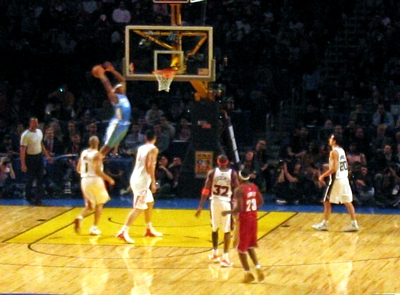
Carmelo Anthony receiving an alley-oop during the 2004 Rookie Challenge game.

=== Friday ===
- NBA All-Star Celebrity Game: First held in 2003, the game features retired NBA players, WNBA players, actors, musicians, media influencers, and athletes from sports other than basketball.
- Rising Stars Challenge: From 1994 until 1999, the event was called the "Rookie Game," and composed entirely of first-year players. From 2000 through 2011, the game, renamed the "Rookie Challenge", featured a team of first-year players ('Rookies') against a team of second-year players ('Sophomores'). The 2012 game debuted a new name, the "Rising Stars Challenge", and a new format. While the game continued to feature first- and second-year players, the participants were assigned to teams in a "fantasy draft" by two honorary captains (Charles Barkley and Shaquille O'Neal in 2012 and 2013, Grant Hill and Chris Webber in 2014). In 2015, the Rising Stars Challenge format was switched again to a USA vs the World format. In 2022, the format was changed yet again, as a mini tournament of 4 teams drafted by honorary captains (Rick Barry, Gary Payton, Isiah Thomas, and James Worthy) and included prospects from the NBA G League.

=== Saturday ===
- Slam Dunk Contest: This competition showcases the creativity and athletic ability of some of the league's best and youngest dunkers. The specific rules of the contest are decided each year, but the competition is always judged subjectively. After each dunk, or attempted dunk, competitors are awarded a mark out of 50 from five judges, giving a possible average high score of 50. The usual rules of 'traveling' and double dribbling do not apply. The most recent winner is Keshad Johnson of the Miami Heat.
- Three-Point Contest: The league's best three point shooters shoot five basketballs from five different spots around the three-point line. Each shot is worth one point except the last ball of each rack (informally called 'money balls'), which is worth two points. The highest score available in one round has been 34 points since 2014, when the format changed so that in addition to the last ball of every rack, one of the five racks would contain entirely money balls. In 2020, two Mountain Dew shots from further away, worth three points each, were added, bringing the maximum score to 40. The shooters have 70 seconds to shoot the basketballs. The most recent winner is Damian Lillard of the Portland Trail Blazers.
- Shooting Stars Competition: Held from 2004 to 2015 and returned in 2026, the contest involves teams consisting of two active NBA players and a retired NBA player competing together in a two-round shooting competition, in which each team must shoot from seven locations in order and each player must shoot from each location to score the most points. As of 2026, the most recent winner is Team Knicks (Jalen Brunson, Karl-Anthony Towns, and Allan Houston).

=== Sunday ===
- NBA All-Star Game

=== Former events ===
- 2Ball: Held in 1998, 2000, and 2001.
- Clorox Clutch Challenge: Held in 2022 to honor the NBA's 75th season. Tyrese Haliburton of the Indiana Pacers and Desmond Bane of the Memphis Grizzlies were winners of the 2022 event.
- D-League All-Star Game: Held from 2007 to 2017, this game featured the best players from the NBA Development League (known as the G League since the 2017–18 season). The first winner was the East by a score of 114–100. The D-League All-Star game was not held in the same arena as all the other All-Star Saturday activities. Instead, it was held on NBA Jam Session's practice court. In 2018, the All-Star Game was replaced by the NBA G League International Challenge, which was not held during NBA All-Star Weekend for either of its editions. Since 2022, G League players have taken part in the Rising Stars Challenge.
- D-League Dream Factory Friday Night: Held from 2008 to 2018. Modeled after All Star Saturday Night, the Dream Factory events featured players from the NBA D-League. Like the D-League All-Star Game, Dream Factory was held on the NBA Jam Session practice court. Events included:
  - H–O–R–S–E Competition: Held in 2008 and 2009.
  - Hot-Shot Competition: Held in 2008.
  - Slam Dunk Contest: Held from 2008 to 2018.
  - Shooting Stars Competition: Held from 2010 to 2012.
  - Three-Point Contest: Held from 2008 to 2017.
- H–O–R–S–E Competition: Held in 2009, 2010, and 2020. In 2020, due to the suspension of the NBA season because of the COVID-19 pandemic, the NBA produced a televised event in which NBA and WNBA players participated in a virtual H–O–R–S–E competition while quarantining at their respective homes. The NBA raised $200,000 for charities while Mike Conley Jr. of the Utah Jazz won the first virtual competition, edging the Chicago Bulls' Zach LaVine.
- Hoop-it-up All Star Tournament: Held in 2002 and 2003.
- Legends Classic: Held from 1984 to 1993, the Classic was a game featuring retired NBA players. As in the All-Star Game, the teams were designated East and West. The Legends game opened the Saturday program. The NBA canceled the Legends Classic after 1994 due to the players' frequent injuries from the game, perhaps due to the large range in fitness levels among younger and older alumni. The Rising Stars Challenge is its replacement. A similar event named the Old-Timers Game was held in 1957 and 1964.
- Read To Achieve: Held from 2002 to 2004
- Skills Challenge: Held from 2003 to 2025, the Skills Challenge pit selected players in a timed obstacle course of dribbling, shooting and passing. Agility, quickness and accuracy all came into play.
- Stay In School Jam/Celebration: Held from 1991 to 1995.
- Team-Up Celebration: Held in 1997, 1998, 2000, and 2001.
