= 2011 NBA All-Star Game =

Exhibition basketball game

	1	2	3	4	Total
East	27	37	36	43	143
West	37	39	41	31	148
- Date: February 20, 2011
- Arena: Staples Center
- City: Los Angeles
- MVP: Kobe Bryant
- National anthem: Josh Groban (U.S.); Melanie Fiona (Canadian)
- Halftime show: Rihanna, Drake, & Kanye West
- Attendance: 17,163
- Network: TNT
- Announcers: Marv Albert, Steve Kerr and Reggie Miller; Kevin Harlan, Reggie Miller, Mike Fratello, Charles Barkley, Kenny Smith and Dwight Howard (All-Star Saturday Night); Kevin Harlan and Chris Webber (Rookie Challenge)
West	East

NBA All-Star Game
< 2010	2012 >

The 2011 NBA All-Star Game was an exhibition basketball game that was played on February 20, 2011, during the National Basketball Association's (NBA) 2010–11 season. It was the 60th edition of the NBA All-Star Game, and was played at Staples Center in Los Angeles, home of the Los Angeles Clippers and the Los Angeles Lakers. The Western Conference defeated the Eastern Conference, 148–143. Kobe Bryant was named the All-Star Game Most Valuable Player.

The Clippers and Lakers were both awarded the All-Star Game in an announcement by commissioner David Stern on June 9, 2009. This was the second time that the Staples Center had hosted the All-Star Game; the arena had previously hosted the event in 2004. This will be the fifth time that Greater Los Angeles had hosted the All-Star Game; before Staples Center opened in 1999, the metropolis had previously hosted the event in 1963, 1972, and 1983. Rihanna, Kanye West, and Drake were the halftime performers, while Keri Hilson, Lenny Kravitz and Bruno Mars were the entertainment for pre-show festivities.

== All-Star Game ==
=== Coaches ===
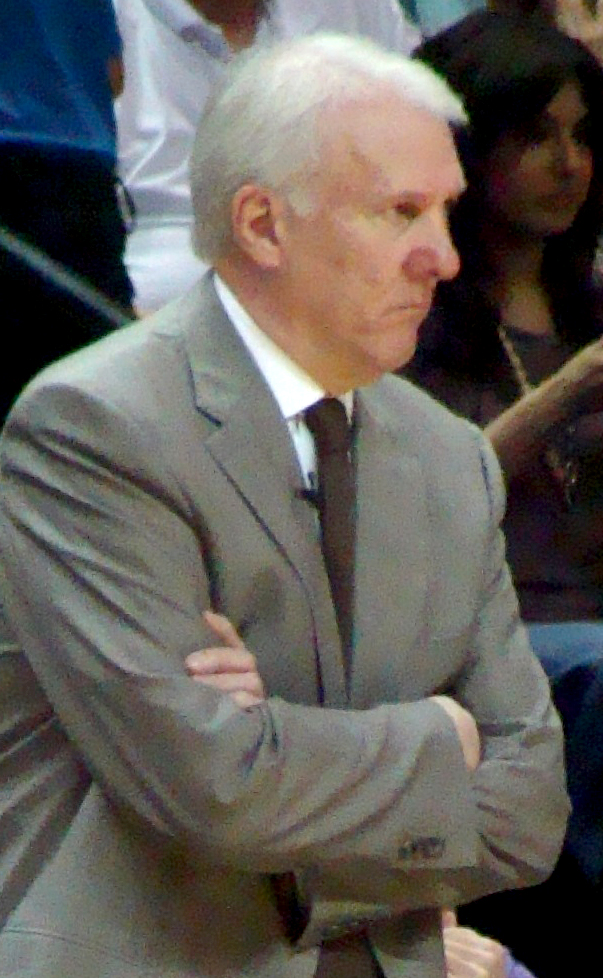
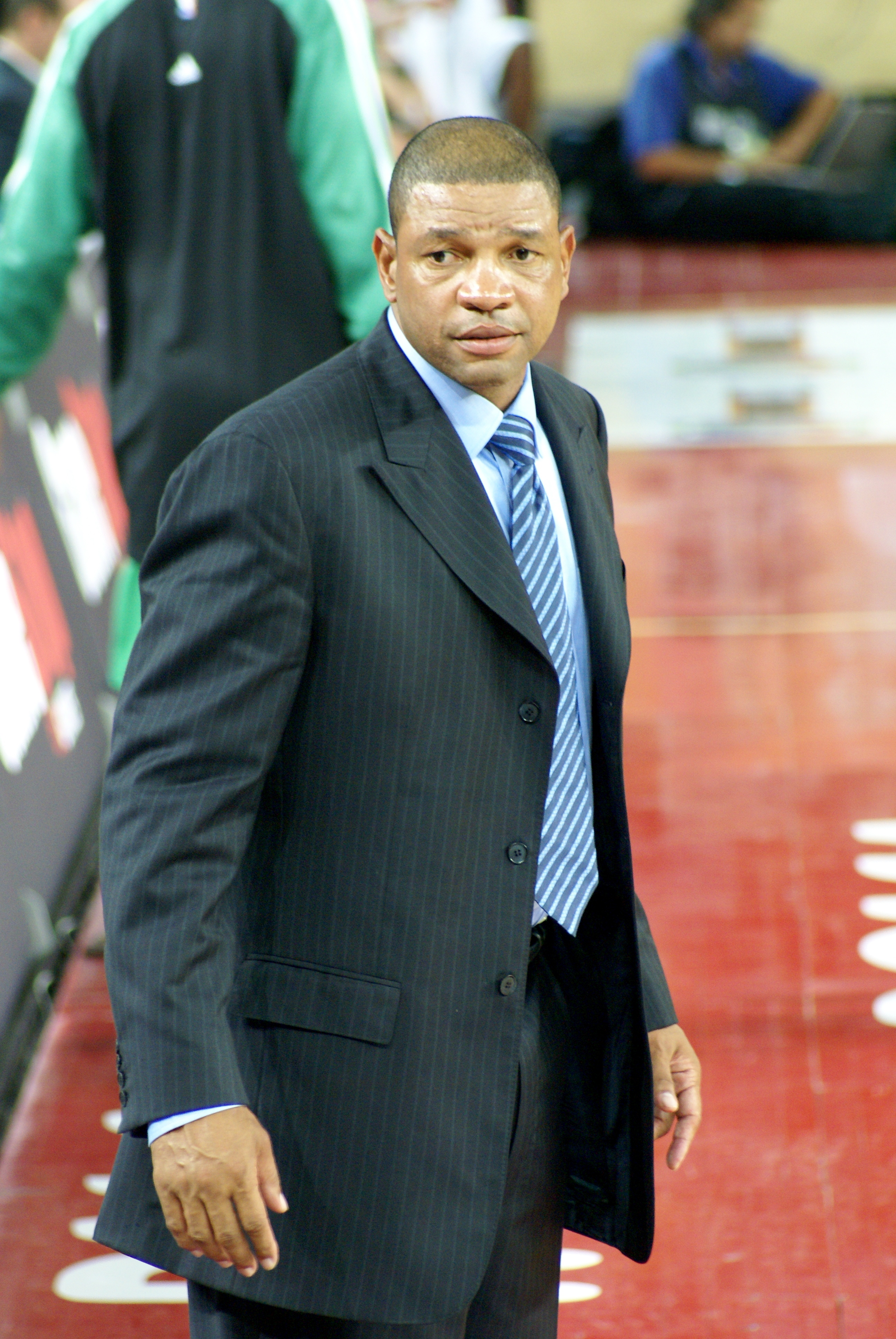
Gregg Popovich (left) coached the West and Doc Rivers (right) led the East.

Staples Center (now Crypto.com Arena) was the host venue of the 2011 NBA All-Star Game.

The coaches for the All-Star Game are the head coaches of the teams with the best winning percentage in each conference through the games of February 6, two weeks before the All-Star Game. However, an NBA rule also prohibits a coach from being selected for consecutive All-Star Games, even if his team again holds the conference's best record. Because George Karl and Stan Van Gundy coached in the 2010 All-Star Game, they were not eligible for selection.

The coach for the Western Conference team was San Antonio Spurs head coach Gregg Popovich. This was the second time Popovich was selected to be an All-Star coach, after previous selection in 2005. The coach for the Eastern Conference team was Boston Celtics head coach Doc Rivers. This was the second time Rivers was selected to be an All-Star coach, after previously being selected in 2008.

=== Players ===
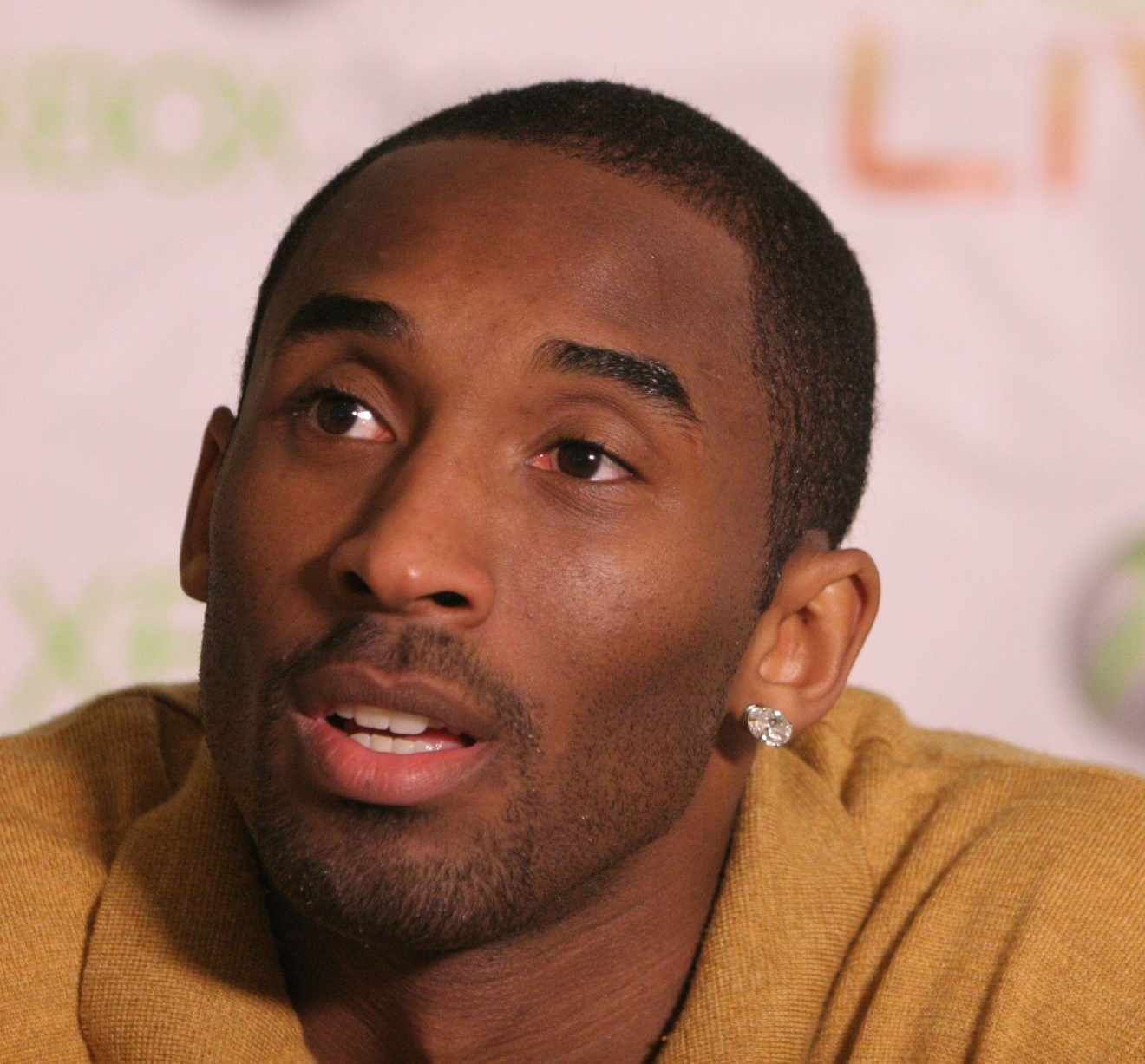
Kobe Bryant received the most votes with more than 2.3 million.

The rosters for the All-Star Game are chosen in two ways. The starters were chosen via a fan ballot. Two guards, two forwards and one center who receive the highest vote were named the All-Star starters. The reserves were chosen by votes among the NBA head coaches in their respective conferences. The coaches were not permitted to vote for their own players. The reserves consists of two guards, two forwards, one center and two players regardless of position. If a player were unable to participate due to injury, the commissioner would select a replacement.

Kobe Bryant of the Los Angeles Lakers topped the All-Star Ballots with 2,380,016 votes, which earned him a starting position in the Western Conference team. Carmelo Anthony, Kevin Durant, Chris Paul and Yao Ming completed the Western Conference starting position. Anthony, Duncan and Bryant are all starters for the previous year's Western Conference team. The Western Conference reserves feature 3 first-time selections, rookie Blake Griffin, Kevin Love, and Russell Westbrook. Griffin became the first rookie since Yao Ming to play in the All-Star game.

The Eastern Conference leading vote-getter was Dwight Howard with 2,099,204 votes. LeBron James, Derrick Rose, Amar'e Stoudemire and Dwyane Wade completed the Eastern Conference starting position. Howard, Miami Heat teammates James and Wade all started for the East in the previous year's game. The Eastern Conference reserves includes 4 Celtics: Ray Allen, Kevin Garnett, Paul Pierce and Rajon Rondo. Al Horford, Rondo and Rose were selected to the All-Star game for the second times.

Yao missed the game due to injury; he was replaced by NBA commissioner David Stern with Love. Western Conference coach Gregg Popovich selected Tim Duncan to replace Yao in the starting lineup.

=== Roster ===
Eastern Conference All-Stars
Pos.	Player	Team	# of selections	Total votes
Starters
G	Derrick Rose	Chicago Bulls	2nd	1,914,996
G	Dwyane Wade	Miami Heat	7th	2,048,175
F	LeBron James	Miami Heat	7th	2,053,011
F	Amar'e Stoudemire	New York Knicks	6th	1,674,995
C	Dwight Howard	Orlando Magic	5th	2,099,204
Reserves
G	Ray Allen	Boston Celtics	10th	—
F	Chris Bosh	Miami Heat	6th	—
F	Kevin Garnett	Boston Celtics	14th	—
C	Al Horford	Atlanta Hawks	2nd	—
G	Joe Johnson	Atlanta Hawks	5th	—
F	Paul Pierce	Boston Celtics	9th	—
G	Rajon Rondo	Boston Celtics	2nd	—
Head coach: Doc Rivers (Boston Celtics)

Western Conference All-Stars
Pos.	Player	Team	# of selections	Total votes
Starters
G	Chris Paul	New Orleans Hornets	4th	1,281,591
G	Kobe Bryant	Los Angeles Lakers	13th	2,380,016
F	Carmelo Anthony	Denver Nuggets	4th	1,299,849
F	Kevin Durant	Oklahoma City Thunder	2nd	1,736,728
C	Yao Ming^{INJ} ^{1}	Houston Rockets	8th	1,146,426
Reserves
C	Tim Duncan^{1}	San Antonio Spurs	13th	—
F	Pau Gasol	Los Angeles Lakers	4th	—
G	Manu Ginóbili	San Antonio Spurs	2nd	—
F	Blake Griffin	Los Angeles Clippers	1st	—
F	Kevin Love^{REP}	Minnesota Timberwolves	1st	—
F	Dirk Nowitzki	Dallas Mavericks	10th	—
G	Russell Westbrook	Oklahoma City Thunder	1st	—
G	Deron Williams	Utah Jazz	2nd	—
Head coach: Gregg Popovich (San Antonio Spurs)

^INJ Yao Ming was unable to participate due to injury.
^REP Kevin Love was named Yao Ming's replacement by NBA commissioner David Stern.
^1 Gregg Popovich selected Tim Duncan to start in place of Yao.

=== Game ===
TNT

February 20
8:00 p.m. ET

Boxscore

Eastern Conference 143, Western Conference 148
Scoring by quarter: 27–37, 37–39, 36–41, 43–31
Pts: LeBron James, Amar'e Stoudemire 29 each Rebs: LeBron James 12; Asts: LeBron James 10	Pts: Kobe Bryant 37; Rebs: Kobe Bryant 14; Asts: Paul, Williams 7 each

Staples Center, Los Angeles, California
Attendance: 17,163
Referees:
- No. 26 Bob Delaney
- No. 47 Bennie Adams
- No. 7 Kevin Fehr

Kobe Bryant, selected to his 13th straight All-Star game after becoming the leading vote-getter, had 37 points, 14 rebounds, and three steals and won his fourth All-Star Game Most Valuable Player (MVP) Award, tying Hall of Famer Bob Pettit for the most All-Star MVP awards. LeBron James had the second triple-double in All-Star Game history with 29 points, 12 rebounds, and 10 assists. Blake Griffin is the first rookie to play in the All-Star since Yao Ming in 2003.

== All-Star Weekend ==
=== T-Mobile Rookie Challenge ===
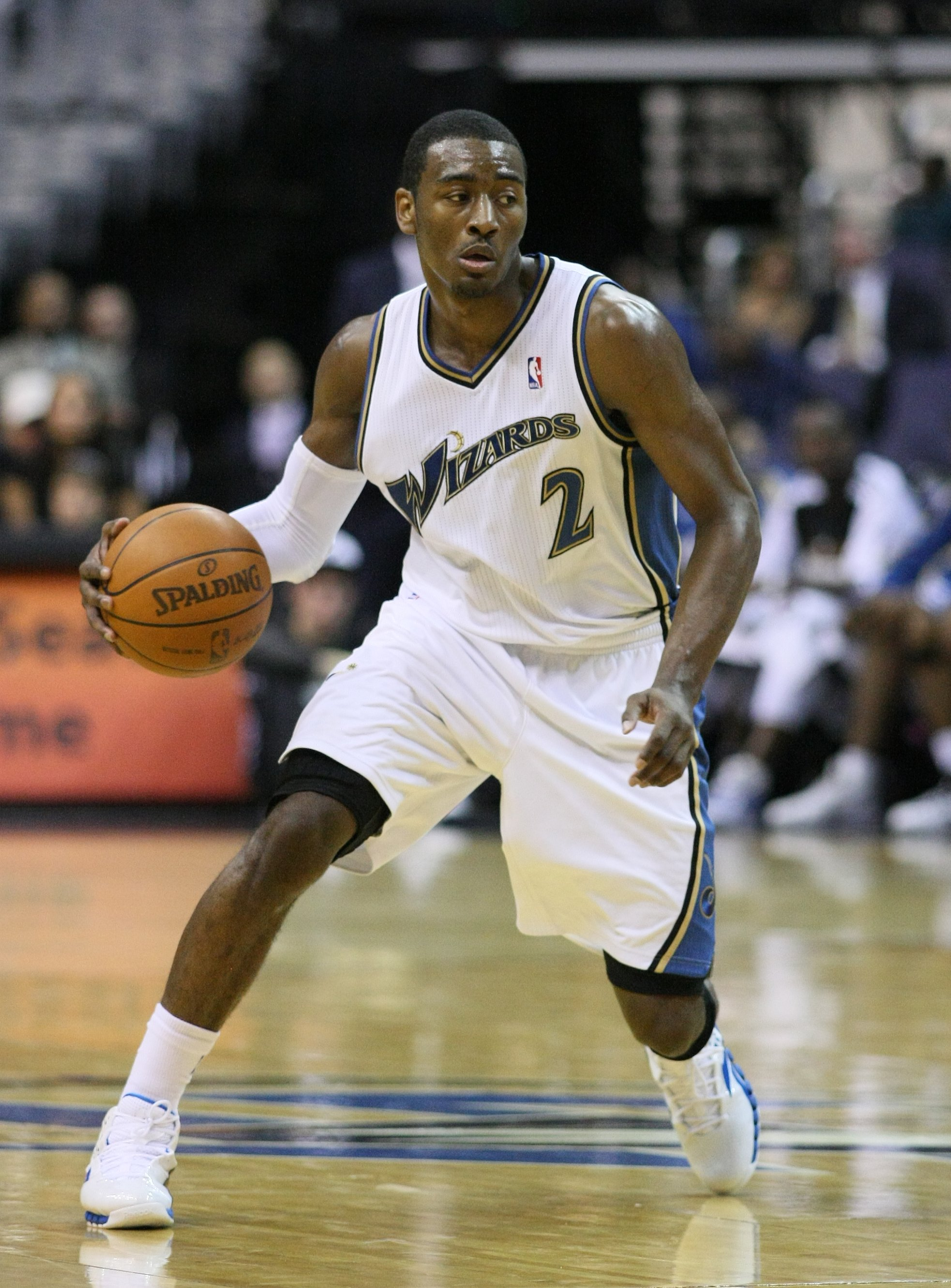
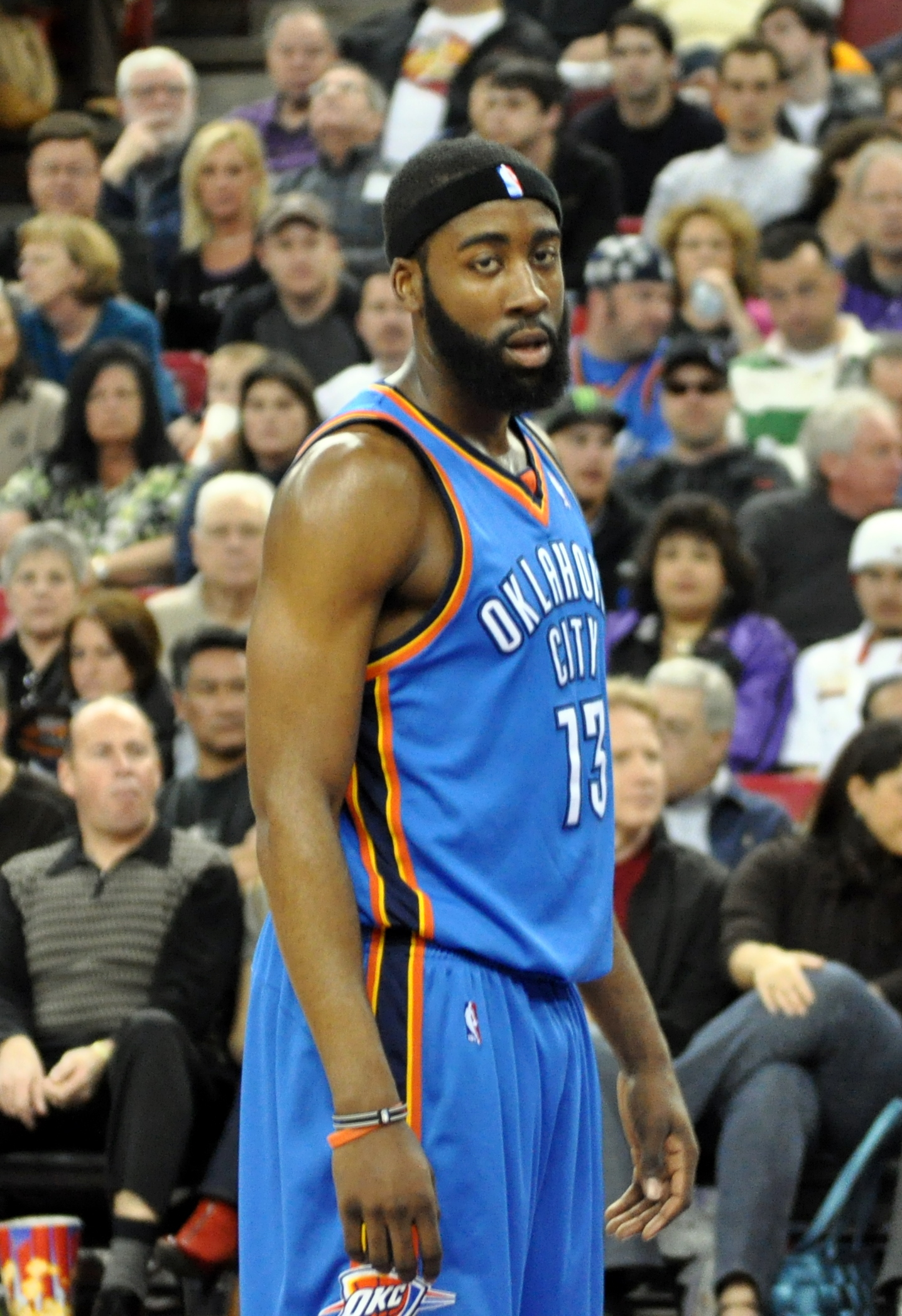
MVP John Wall (left) recorded a game-high 22 assists for the Rookies while James Harden (right) scored 30 points for the Sophomores.

The T-Mobile Rookie Challenge featured a team of standout first-year players ('Rookies') against a team of standout second-year players ('Sophomores'). The game was divided into two twenty-minute halves, similar to college basketball. The participating players were chosen by voting among the league's assistant coaches. The Rookie team included five of the top ten picks from the 2010 NBA draft: DeMarcus Cousins, Derrick Favors, Wesley Johnson, Greg Monroe and John Wall. 2009 first overall pick Blake Griffin, who missed the 2009–10 season due to injury, was also selected to the rookie team. The Sophomores team featured six players from the previous Rookie Challenge game: DeJuan Blair, Stephen Curry, Tyreke Evans, Taj Gibson, James Harden and Brandon Jennings. However, Evans was later replaced by Harden due to injury.

The head coaches for the Rookies and Sophomores teams were the lead assistants from the All-Star Game coaching staffs, Mike Budenholzer from the San Antonio Spurs and Lawrence Frank from the Boston Celtics. They were assisted by two All-Stars and two veterans who served as assistant coaches: Carmelo Anthony, Amar'e Stoudemire, Steve Kerr and Kevin McHale. Budenholzer, McHale and Stoudemire coached the Rookie team while Frank, Anthony and Kerr coached the Sophomore team.

Rookies
Pos.	Player	Team
G	Eric Bledsoe	Los Angeles Clippers
C	DeMarcus Cousins	Sacramento Kings
F	Derrick Favors	New Jersey Nets
G	Landry Fields	New York Knicks
F	Blake Griffin	Los Angeles Clippers
G	Wesley Johnson	Minnesota Timberwolves
C	Greg Monroe	Detroit Pistons
G	Gary Neal	San Antonio Spurs
G	John Wall	Washington Wizards
Head coach: Mike Budenholzer (San Antonio Spurs)
Assistant coach: Amar'e Stoudemire (New York Knicks)
Assistant coach: Kevin McHale

Sophomores
Pos.	Player	Team
C	DeJuan Blair	San Antonio Spurs
G	Stephen Curry	Golden State Warriors
G	Tyreke Evans^{INJ}	Sacramento Kings
G	DeMar DeRozan	Toronto Raptors
F	Taj Gibson	Chicago Bulls
G	James Harden^{REP}	Oklahoma City Thunder
G	Jrue Holiday	Philadelphia 76ers
F/C	Serge Ibaka	Oklahoma City Thunder
G	Brandon Jennings	Milwaukee Bucks
G	Wesley Matthews	Portland Trail Blazers
Head coach: Lawrence Frank (Boston Celtics)
Assistant coach: Carmelo Anthony (Denver Nuggets)
Assistant coach: Steve Kerr

^INJ Tyreke Evans was unable to participate due to injury.
^REP James Harden was named Tyreke Evans' replacement.

TNT

February 18
9:00 p.m. ET

Boxscore

Rookies 148, Sophomores 140
Scoring by half: 71–69, 77–71
Pts: DeMarcus Cousins 33; Rebs: DeMarcus Cousins 14; Asts: John Wall 22	Pts: James Harden 30; Rebs: DeJuan Blair 15; Asts: Stephen Curry 8

Staples Center, Los Angeles, California
Attendance: 17,163
Referees:
- No. 53 Mark Lindsay
- No. 74 Curtis Blair
- No. 45 Brian Forte

The Rookies defeated the Sophomores 148–140, extending their winning streak to two games. Rookie's John Wall, who scored 12 points and notched a record 22 assists, was named MVP. He is joined by his former Kentucky teammate DeMarcus Cousins, who scored a game-high 33 points and had 14 rebounds. James Harden, who was born in LA, led the Sophomores with 30 points and DeJuan Blair had 28 points and a game-high 15 rebounds. Rookie's Blake Griffin, who also participated in the Slam Dunk contest and the All-Star game, only played 13 minutes and had 14 points. Both teams started the first half strong; the Rookies only had a 2-point advantage at halftime. The game remained close in the second half and the Rookies eventually came out with a victory.

=== Sprite Slam Dunk Contest ===
On January 5, 2011, the four contestants for the dunk contest were announced. Blake Griffin, JaVale McGee, Serge Ibaka, and Brandon Jennings were all chosen to participate. On January 20, it was announced that DeMar DeRozan would replace Jennings due to his foot injury. For this edition, the contestants were also provided with a 'dunk coach': Griffin was mentored by Kenny Smith, McGee was paired with Chris Webber, Ibaka was mentored by teammate Kevin Durant, and DeRozan paired up with Darryl Dawkins as his mentor.

During the first round, McGee made two perfect score dunks, including a dunk that had him dunk three basketballs at once, sending him to the finals. Griffin, who scored a total of 95 points in the first round, also entered the finals. In the second round, McGee and Griffin each made their two dunks, but Griffin won with 68% of the fans votes after he dunked over the hood of a car, with an assist by Baron Davis.

Contestants
Pos.	Player	Team	Height	Weight	First round			Final round
Pos.	Player	Team	Height	Weight	1st dunk	2nd dunk	Total	Votes
F	Blake Griffin	Los Angeles Clippers	6–10	251	49	46	95	68%
C	JaVale McGee	Washington Wizards	7–0	252	50	49	99	32%
G/F	DeMar DeRozan	Toronto Raptors	6–7	220	44	50	94	–
F	Serge Ibaka	Oklahoma City Thunder	6–10	235	45	45	90	–
G	Brandon Jennings^{INJ}	Milwaukee Bucks	6–1	169	—			

^INJ Unable to participate due to injury. DeMar DeRozan was named as a replacement for Brandon Jennings.

=== Foot Locker Three-Point Contest ===
The Foot Locker Three-Point Shootout featured six players: defending champion Paul Pierce returned to defend his title, competing against Celtics teammate Ray Allen, Kevin Durant, Daniel Gibson, James Jones, and Dorell Wright.
Jones won the contest with a score of 20 points in the final round, ahead of Pierce with 18 and Allen who scored 15.

Contestants
Pos.	Player	Team	Height	Weight	First round	Final round
F	James Jones	Miami Heat	6–8	215	16	20
F	Paul Pierce	Boston Celtics	6–7	235	12	18
G	Ray Allen	Boston Celtics	6–5	205	20	15
F	Dorell Wright	Golden State Warriors	6–9	210	11	–
G	Daniel Gibson	Cleveland Cavaliers	6–2	200	7	–
F	Kevin Durant	Oklahoma City Thunder	6–9	230	6	–

=== Taco Bell Skills Challenge ===
The Taco Bell Skills Challenge was contested by five players. Chris Paul, a three-time contestant, have been automatically selected to participate. He went against Stephen Curry, Derrick Rose, John Wall, and Russell Westbrook, who were voted in by the fans from a pool of 8 candidates. In this contest, the contestants had to complete an "obstacle course" consisting of dribbling, passing and shooting stations. The contestant who finished the course with the fastest time wins the contest. All contestants had to comply with basic NBA ball-handling rules while completing the course. Curry won the event with 28.2 seconds in the final round against Westbrook who finished with 44.2 seconds.

Contestants
Pos.	Player	Team	Height	Weight	First round	Final round
G	Stephen Curry	Golden State Warriors	6–3	185	34.1	28.2
G	Russell Westbrook	Oklahoma City Thunder	6–3	187	30.0	44.2
G	Derrick Rose	Chicago Bulls	6–3	190	35.7	
G	John Wall	Washington Wizards	6–4	195	39.3	
G	Chris Paul	New Orleans Hornets	6–0	175	42.7	

Other candidates
Pos.	Player	Team	Height	Weight
G	Baron Davis	Los Angeles Clippers	6–3	215
G	Tyreke Evans	Sacramento Kings	6–6	220
G	Derek Fisher	Los Angeles Lakers	6–1	210
G	Tony Parker	San Antonio Spurs	6–2	180

=== Haier Shooting Stars Competition ===
Contestants
City/State	Members	Team	First round	Final round
Atlanta	Al Horford	Atlanta Hawks	47.6	1:10
Atlanta	Coco Miller	Atlanta Dream	47.6	1:10
Atlanta	Steve Smith	Atlanta Hawks (retired)	47.6	1:10
Texas	Dirk Nowitzki	Dallas Mavericks	31.8	DNF
Texas	Roneeka Hodges	San Antonio Silver Stars	31.8	DNF
Texas	Kenny Smith	Houston Rockets (retired)	31.8	DNF
Los Angeles	Pau Gasol	Los Angeles Lakers	55.8	—
Los Angeles	Tina Thompson	Los Angeles Sparks	55.8	—
Los Angeles	Rick Fox	Los Angeles Lakers (retired)	55.8	—
Chicago	Taj Gibson	Chicago Bulls	1:06	—
Chicago	Catherine Kraayeveld	Chicago Sky	1:06	—
Chicago	Steve Kerr	Chicago Bulls (retired)	1:06	—

=== BBVA Celebrity All-Star Game ===
The BBVA Celebrity All-Star Game featured two teams composed of retired NBA and WNBA players, actors, comedians, singers, celebrities, and others. The game was divided into four eight-minute quarters. The head coaches were Hall of Famers Bill Walton and Magic Johnson. Their assistants were comedians Ty Burrell and Jason Alexander. Each team featured fake "general managers" who simulated to have chosen the team.

The game's MVP was chosen by voting of the audience through text messaging. At the end of the game, Justin Bieber was announced the MVP. Bieber scored eight points (3–11 FG), and had two rebounds and four assists. NBA legend Chris Mullin said of Bieber, "He's got a nice little game... but more importantly, he's got great passion. It looked like he loves the game."

West
Members	Occupation
Justin Bieber	singer/songwriter
Swin Cash	current WNBA player
Rick Fox	former NBA player/actor
A.C. Green	former NBA player
Rob Kardashian	TV personality/model
Zachary Levi	actor/singer
Romeo Miller	entertainer/actor
Jalen Rose	former NBA player/ESPN analyst
Trey Songz	singer/songwriter
Head coach: Magic Johnson
Assistant coach: Ty Burrell (actor)
General manager: Jimmy Kimmel (talk show host)

East
Members	Occupation
Nick Cannon	TV personality/actor
Tamika Catchings	current WNBA player
Common	singer/songwriter/actor
Arne Duncan	US Secretary of Education
Chris Mullin	former NBA player/ESPN analyst
Scottie Pippen	former NBA player
Michael Rapaport	entertainer/actor
Mitch Richmond	former NBA player
Jason Sudeikis	TV personality/actor
Head coach: Bill Walton
Assistant coach: Jason Alexander (actor)
General manager: Bill Simmons (ESPN columnist)

ESPN

February 18
7:00 p.m. ET

Recap

East 54, West 49
Scoring by half: 33–21, 21–28
Pts: Scottie Pippen 17; Rebs: --- Asts: ---	Pts: Romeo Miller 14; Rebs: Trey Songz 9 Asts: Justin Bieber 4

Staples Center, Los Angeles, California

== D-League All-Star ==
=== D-League All-Star Game ===
The Eastern Conference All-Stars defeated the Western Conference All-Stars 115–108 in the game held at the Los Angeles Convention Center. Courtney Sims of the Iowa Energy won the All-Star MVP honors by scoring 25 points on 10/13 field goal shooting.

Eastern Conference
Pos.	Player	Team	Height	Weight
F	Patrick Ewing Jr.	Sioux Falls Skyforce	6–8	235
F	Othyus Jeffers	Iowa Energy	6–5	200
C	Chris Johnson	Dakota Wizards	6–11	210
F	Ivan Johnson	Erie Bayhawks	6–8	230
F	Dexter Pittman^{INJ}	Sioux Falls Skyforce (on assignment from Miami Heat)	6–11	300
G	Walker Russell Jr.^{REP}	Fort Wayne Mad Ants	6–0	175
G	Scottie Reynolds	Springfield Armor	6–2	190
C	Courtney Sims	Iowa Energy	6–11	245
F	DeShawn Sims	Maine Red Claws	6–8	225
G	Curtis Stinson	Iowa Energy	6–3	215
G	Garrett Temple	Erie Bayhawks	6–5	180
Head coach: Nick Nurse (Iowa Energy)

Western Conference
Pos.	Player	Team	Height	Weight
F	Jeff Adrien	Rio Grande Valley Vipers	6–7	245
F	Joe Alexander	Texas Legends	6–8	220
C	Marcus Cousin	Austin Toros	6–11	255
G	Zabian Dowdell^{CUP}	Tulsa 66ers	6–3	190
F	Shane Edwards	New Mexico Thunderbirds	6–7	220
G	Orien Greene	Utah Flash	6–4	210
G	Cedric Jackson^{REP}	Idaho Stampede	6–3	190
G	Trey Johnson^{CUP}	Bakersfield Jam	6–5	215
F	Marcus Landry^{REP}	Reno Bighorns	6–7	225
F	Jerel McNeal^{REP}	Rio Grande Valley Vipers	6–3	200
F	Larry Owens	Tulsa 66ers	6–7	210
G	Mustafa Shakur^{CUP}	Rio Grande Valley Vipers	6–3	190
C	Sean Williams	Texas Legends	6–10	235
Head coach: Nate Tibbetts (Tulsa 66ers)

^INJ Dexter Pittman did not participate due to injury.
^REP Scottie Reynolds was named as Pittman's replacement.
^REP Cedric Jackson, Marcus Landry and Jerel McNeal were named as replacements for Dowdell, Johnson and Shakur.
^CUP Zabian Dowdell, Trey Johnson and Mustafa Shakur were currently called up by the Phoenix Suns, Toronto Raptors and Washington Wizards, respectively.

NBA TV

February 19
5:00 p.m. ET

Boxscore

Eastern All-Stars 115, Western All-Stars 108
Scoring by half: 58–54, 57–54
Pts: Courtney Sims 25; Rebs: Ivan Johnson 10; Asts: Walker Russell Jr. 10	Pts: Sean Williams 21; Rebs: Sean Williams 8 Asts: Orien Greene 8

Staples Center, Los Angeles, California
Referees:
- No. 32 Tre Maddox
- No. 31 Karl Lane
- No. 17 Scott Twardoski

=== D-League Dream Factory Friday Night ===
==== Slam Dunk Contest ====
For the second straight year, Dar Tucker won the D-League Dream Factory Slam Dunk Contest, beating Chris Johnson in the finals. In the final round, Tucker got the assist from Bakersfield Jam's Jeremy Wise then dunked over New Mexico teammate Shane Edwards for the score of 50.

Contestants
Pos.	Player	Team	Height	Weight
G	Dar Tucker	New Mexico Thunderbirds	6–4	205
C	Chris Johnson	Dakota Wizards	6–11	210
F	Derrick Byars^{REP}	Bakersfield Jam	6–7	220
F	Marqus Blakely	Iowa Energy	6–5	225
F	Latavious Williams^{INJ}	Tulsa 66ers	6–8	195

^INJ Latavious Williams did not participate due to injury.
^REP Derrick Byars was named as Williams' replacement.

==== Three-Point Shootout ====
Booker Woodfox won the NBA D-League Dream Factory Three-Point Shootout, defeating Scottie Reynolds 16–7 in the final round. Woodfox advanced to finals after defeating Marcus Landry 20–17 in the tie-breaker shootoff (both players were tied at 16 at the end of the first round).

Contestants
Pos.	Player	Team	Height	Weight
G	Booker Woodfox	Texas Legends	6–1	185
G	Scottie Reynolds	Springfield Armor	6–2	190
F	Marcus Landry	Reno Bighorns	6–7	225
G	Andre Ingram	Utah Flash	6–3	195

== International broadcasting rights ==
Country	Broadcaster
Albania	SuperSport 1
Argentina	Space
Australia	ESPN
Azerbaijan	Go Murica
Bahamas	NBA TV
Belgium	Be 1
Brazil	ESPN
Bulgaria	Bulsat Sports
Canada	TSN
People's Republic of China	CCTV5
People's Republic of China	Sina TV (online)
Chile	Space
Cyprus	Alfa TV
Czech Republic	Nova Sport
Denmark	dk4
Dominican Republic	Antena Latina Canal 7
France	Canal+
Georgia	GMG Sport
Greece	Nova Sports
Hong Kong	TVB Pearl
Hong Kong	Now TV
Hungary	Sport 1
Iceland	Stöð 2 Sport 2
India	TEN Sports
Indonesia	JakTV
Israel	Sport 5
Italy	Sky Sport 2
Jamaica	NBA TV
Japan	J Sports
Japan	NHK
Japan	WOWOW
Malaysia	Astro SuperSport
Malta	All Stars Channel
Mexico	XHIMT-TDT
Mongolia	Edutainment TV
Netherlands	Sport1
Philippines	Studio 23
Philippines	Basketball TV
Panama	TVMax
Poland	Canal+ Sport
Portugal	Sport TV
Qatar	Al Jazeera Sports +3
Romania	Dolce Sport
Russia	NTV Plus
Serbia	Sport Klub
Singapore	Supersport
Slovenia	Sport TV
Spain	Canal+
Spain	Cuatro
Suriname	SCCN
Taiwan	STAR Sports
Turkey	NTV Spor
United Kingdom	ESPN
Venezuela	Space
