= Robert Covington =

American basketball player (born 1990)

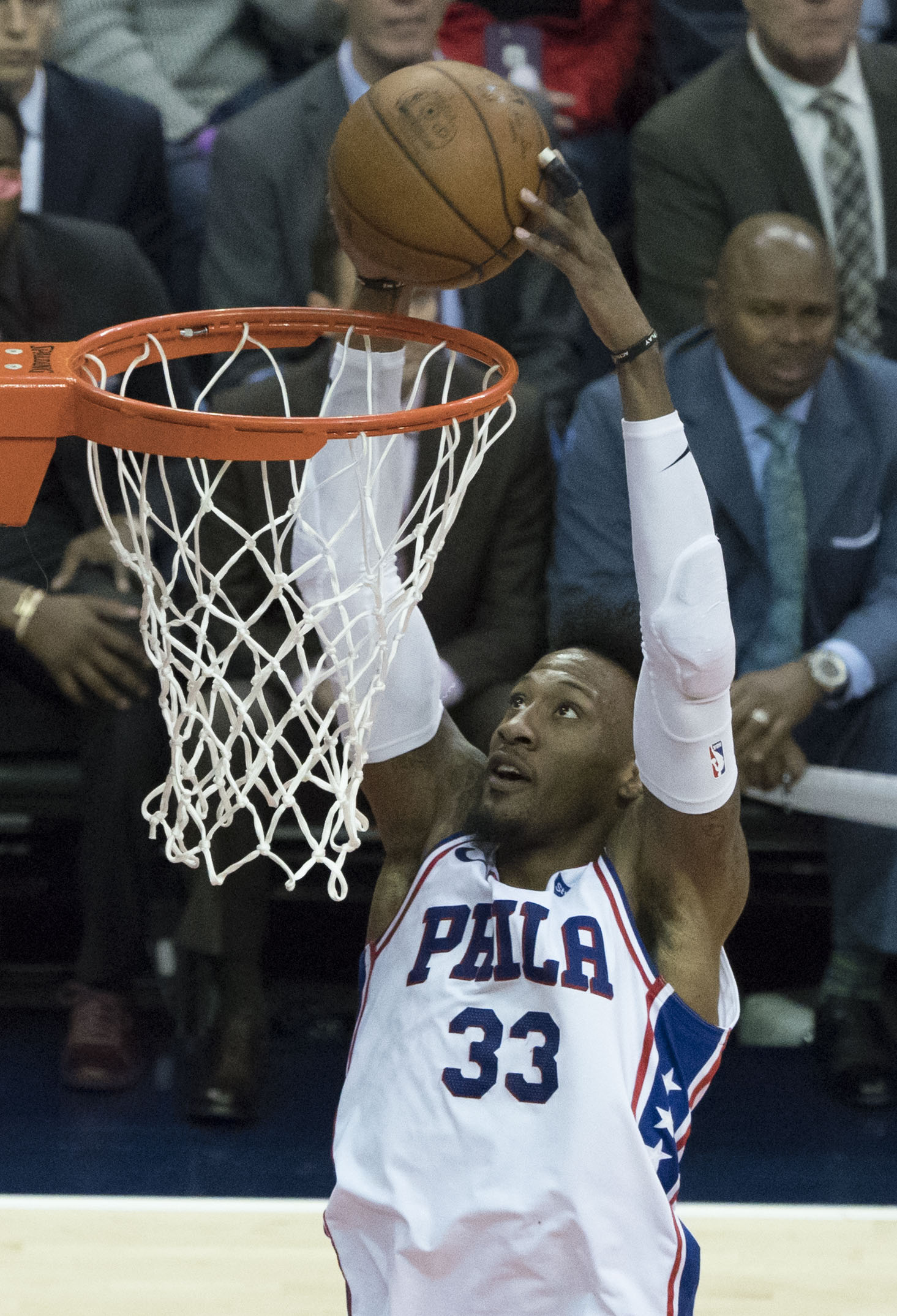
- Covington with the Philadelphia 76ers in 2018

Free agent
- Position: Small forward / power forward

Personal information
- Born: December 14, 1990 (age 35) Bellwood, Illinois, U.S.
- Listed height: 6 ft 7 in (2.01 m)
- Listed weight: 209 lb (95 kg)

Career information
- High school: Proviso West (Hillside, Illinois)
- College: Tennessee State (2009–2013)
- NBA draft: 2013: undrafted
- Playing career: 2013–present

Career history
- 2013–2014: Houston Rockets
- 2013–2014: →Rio Grande Valley Vipers
- 2014–2018: Philadelphia 76ers
- 2018–2020: Minnesota Timberwolves
- 2020: Houston Rockets
- 2020–2022: Portland Trail Blazers
- 2022–2023: Los Angeles Clippers
- 2023–2024: Philadelphia 76ers

Career highlights
- NBA All-Defensive First Team (2018); NBA D-League All-Star (2014); NBA D-League All-Star Game MVP (2014); All-NBA D-League First Team (2014); NBA D-League Rookie of the Year (2014); First-team All-OVC (2012); 2× Second-team All-OVC (2011, 2013); OVC All-Newcomer Team (2010)
- Stats at NBA.com
- Stats at Basketball Reference

Robert Covington (born December 14, 1990) is an American former professional basketball player who last played for the Philadelphia 76ers of the National Basketball Association (NBA). He played college basketball for the Tennessee State Tigers, and, in 2018, he was named to the NBA All-Defensive First Team.

== High school career ==
Covington attended Proviso West High School in Hillside, Illinois. As a senior in 2008–09, he averaged 18 points, 11 rebounds and seven blocks per game, and he was named the West Suburban Conference Player of the Year after leading Proviso West to the West Suburban Championship. He was also an All-Area and All-Conference first-team honoree.

== College career ==
In his freshman season at Tennessee State, Covington was named to the Ohio Valley Conference All-Newcomer team and earned Mid-Major Freshman All-America honors from Collegeinsider.com. In 32 games (28 starts), he averaged 11.5 points, 6.5 rebounds, 1.2 assists, 1.1 steals and 1.1 blocks in 27.3 minutes per game.

In his sophomore season, Covington recorded eight double-doubles and was named OVC Player of the Week on December 27, 2010. He led the team in rebounds (7.5 rpg), field goal percentage (.500) and three-point field goal percentage (.460). He also led the OVC with his 46% three-point shooting as he earned second-team All-OVC and second-team NABC Division I All-District 19 honors. In 30 games (all starts), he averaged 13.3 points, 7.5 rebounds, 1.2 assists, 1.5 steals and 1.0 blocks in 30.8 minutes per game.

In his junior season, Covington earned first-team All-OVC and first-team NABC Division I All-District 19 honors and was named the 2011–12 CollegeInsider.com OVC co-MVP. He also earned OVC All-Tournament team and Continental Tire Las Vegas Invitational All-Tournament team honors. At the season's end, he had 1,358 points and 693 rebounds, ranking for 16th and 13th in school history respectively. In 33 games (32 starts), he averaged 17.8 points, 7.9 rebounds, 1.3 assists, 1.5 steals and 1.4 blocks in 31.2 minutes per game.

In his senior season, Covington earned second-team All-OVC and second-team NABC Division I All-District 19 honors for the second time in his career despite missing ten games due to injury. In 23 games (22 starts), he averaged 17.0 points, 8.0 rebounds, 1.3 assists, 2.3 steals and 1.7 blocks in 31.0 minutes per game. He finished his career ranked seventh on Tennessee State's all-time list in both scoring and rebounding, with 1,749 points and 876 rebounds.

== Professional career ==
=== Houston Rockets (2013–2014) ===
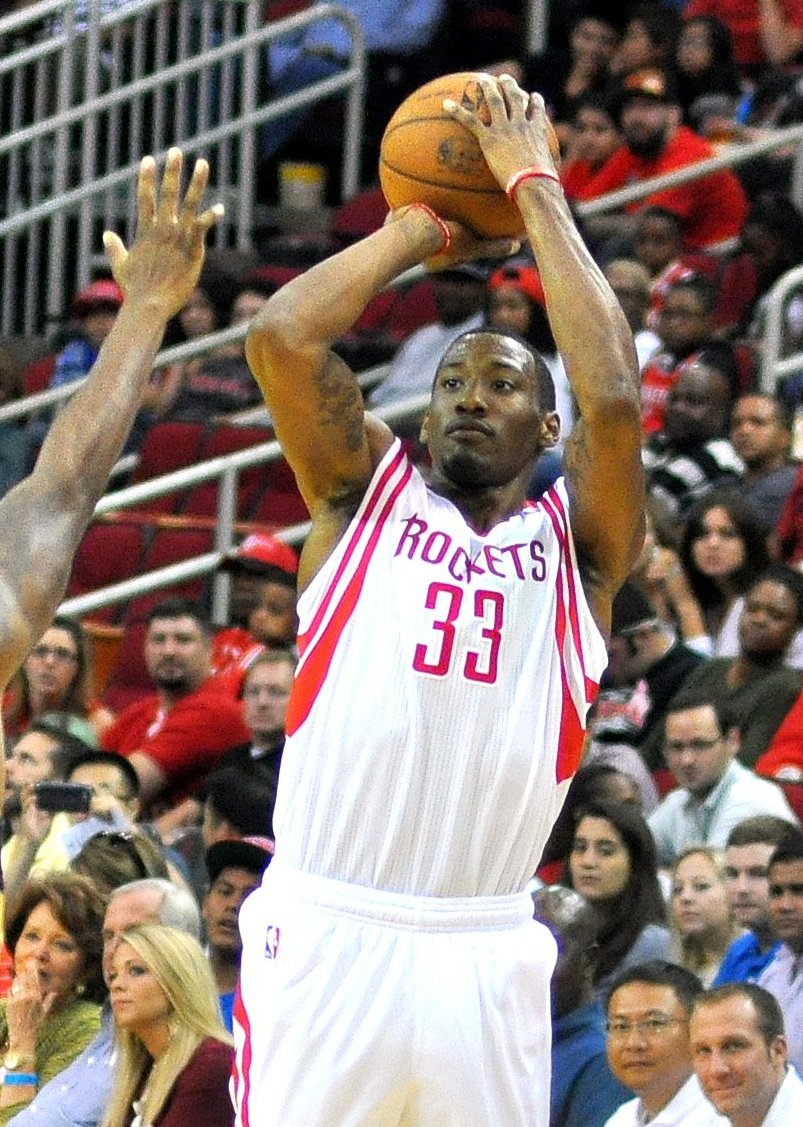
Covington with the Rockets in 2013

After going undrafted in the 2013 NBA draft, Covington joined the Houston Rockets for the 2013 NBA Summer League. On July 15, 2013, he signed a multi-year deal with the Rockets. He spent the majority of the 2013–14 season in the NBA Development League with the Rockets' affiliate team, the Rio Grande Valley Vipers, appearing in just seven NBA games. He participated in the 2014 NBA D-League All-Star Game in February, where scored an NBA D-League All-Star record 33 points, 22 of which came in the game's final six minutes, en route to earning MVP honors in the game. He connected on 12 of his 23 shots, including four-of-eight three-pointers at NBA All-Star festivities in New Orleans. In April, he was named the NBA D-League Rookie of the Year. He played in 42 of the Vipers 50 regular season games, 41 as a starter. He averaged a team-high 23.2 points, good for second best in the NBA D-League, while shooting 44 percent from the field. He also averaged 9.2 rebounds and 2.4 steals per game.

After spending Summer League, training camp and preseason with the Rockets, Covington was waived on October 27, 2014.

Covington was selected 3rd overall by the Grand Rapids Drive in the 2015 D-League Draft. However, he did not play for the team.

=== Philadelphia 76ers (2014–2018) ===
On November 15, 2014, Covington signed a reported five-year contract with the Philadelphia 76ers. He made his debut for the 76ers two days later, recording six points, three rebounds, two assists and two steals in 16 1/2 minutes off the bench in a 100–75 loss to the San Antonio Spurs. On December 3, he scored a career-best 17 points in an 85–77 win over the Minnesota Timberwolves. Two nights later against the Oklahoma City Thunder, he set a new career high. In 28 minutes, he scored 21 points on 8-of-13 shooting and 3-of-6 from beyond the arc. A day later, he did it again, dropping 25 points on 9-of-14 shooting in 29 minutes off the bench in a 108–101 overtime victory over the Detroit Pistons. On March 25, he had a second 25-point effort against the Denver Nuggets. On April 8, Covington scored a career-high 27 points on 8-for-11 shooting in a 119–90 loss to the Washington Wizards. Five days later, he had a third 25-point effort against the Milwaukee Bucks.

After battling injury early in the 2015–16 season, Covington quickly began to excel, leading the NBA with 3.6 steals per game come December. In the final three games of November, Covington secured six-plus steals in each contest, making him the first NBA player to accomplish the feat in three-consecutive games since Alvin Robertson in 1986. On November 27, he recorded career highs of 28 points and eight steals in a 116–114 loss to the Houston Rockets. On December 1, he scored a game-high 23 points to help the 76ers defeat the Los Angeles Lakers 103–91 and end a 28-game losing streak that began on March 27, 2015, during the 2014–15 season. On February 10, he scored a career-high 29 points and hit a career-high seven three-pointers in a loss to the Sacramento Kings. He set a new career high for scoring on April 8 with 30 points against the New York Knicks. On April 12, in a loss to the Toronto Raptors, Covington had his seventh game of the season with six or more three-pointers, joining Stephen Curry, Klay Thompson and J. R. Smith as the only players to do so in 2015–16. In the team's season finale the following day, Covington scored 27 points and again hit six three-pointers in a 115–105 loss to the Chicago Bulls.

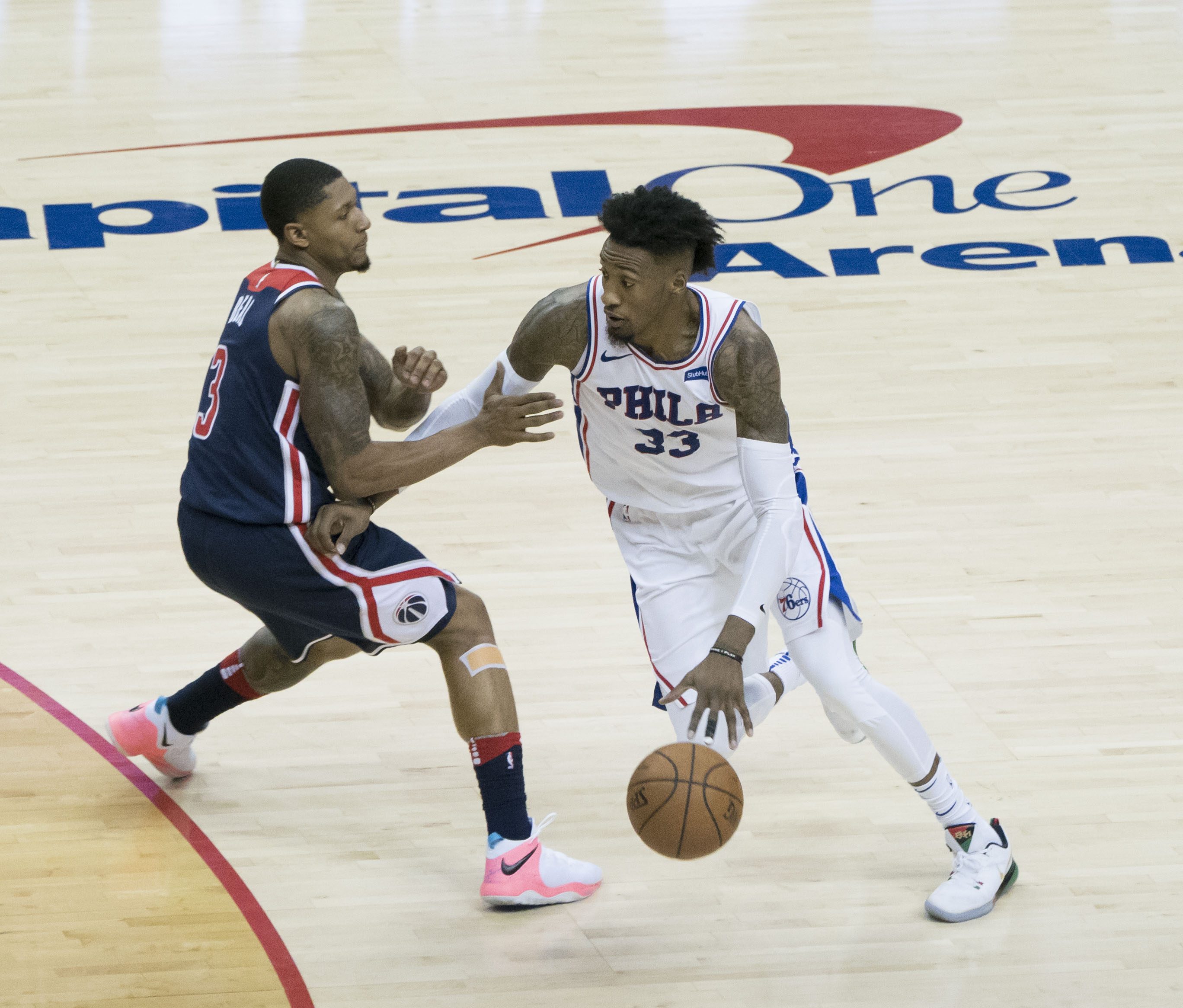
Covington drives against Bradley Beal in 2018

On December 14, 2016, Covington had season highs of 26 points and 12 rebounds in a 123–114 loss to the Raptors. On January 20, 2017, he scored 22 points and made two three-pointers in the final 40 seconds to lead the 76ers to a come-from-behind 93–92 win over the Portland Trail Blazers. On January 29, 2017, he scored 21 points and tied his season high of 12 rebounds in a 121–108 loss to the Bulls. In March 2017, he had 13 rebounds on three occasions. On March 31, he was ruled out for the rest of the season with right knee soreness and swelling.

In the 76ers' season opener on October 18, 2017, Covington scored 29 points in a 120–115 loss to the Wizards. On November 13, he scored a season-high 31 points against the Los Angeles Clippers. On November 17, after restructuring the terms of his contract for the 2017–18 season, he signed a four-year, $62 million contract extension with the 76ers. In May 2018, he was named to the NBA All-Defensive First Team.

Covington started the first 13 games for the 76ers to begin the 2018–19 season.

=== Minnesota Timberwolves (2018–2020) ===
On November 12, 2018, Covington was traded to the Minnesota Timberwolves, along with Jerryd Bayless, Dario Šarić and a 2022 second-round pick, in exchange for Jimmy Butler and Justin Patton. He made his debut for the Timberwolves two days later, recording 13 points and seven rebounds in a 107–100 win over the New Orleans Pelicans. On December 31, late in the Timberwolves' loss to the New Orleans Pelicans, Covington sustained a bone bruise on his right knee. After missing 23 games, he was assigned to the Iowa Wolves of the NBA G League on February 27. On March 21, after suffering a setback in his quest for a return, Covington was ruled out for the rest of the season. He underwent successful arthroscopic surgery on April 1.

=== Return to Houston (2020) ===
On February 5, 2020, Covington returned to the Rockets in a four-team, 12-player trade with Jordan Bell from the Timberwolves; Minnesota received Jarred Vanderbilt, Malik Beasley, Juan Hernangómez, Evan Turner, and a 2020 first-round draft pick. The following day, Covington made his debut in a 121–111 win over the Los Angeles Lakers, scoring 14 points along with eight rebounds in 30 minutes. On February 29, in a 111–110 overtime win over the Boston Celtics, Covington had 16 points, 16 rebounds, and 3 blocks.

=== Portland Trail Blazers (2020–2022) ===
On November 22, 2020, Covington was traded to the Portland Trail Blazers in exchange for Trevor Ariza, the draft rights to Isaiah Stewart and a conditional future first-round pick.

=== Los Angeles Clippers (2022–2023) ===
On February 4, 2022, Covington was traded, alongside Norman Powell, to the Los Angeles Clippers in exchange for Eric Bledsoe, Keon Johnson, Justise Winslow, and a 2025 second-round pick. On April 1, Covington logged a career-high 43 points, along with eight rebounds and three blocks, in a 153–119 blowout win over the Milwaukee Bucks. He also made 11 three-pointers during the game, setting a Clippers franchise record for most three-pointers made in a game. On May 8, Covington signed a two-year, $24 million extension with the Clippers.

=== Return to Philadelphia (2023–2024) ===
On November 1, 2023, the Philadelphia 76ers acquired Covington, Marcus Morris Sr., Kenyon Martin Jr. and Nicolas Batum from the Clippers in exchange for James Harden, P. J. Tucker, and Filip Petrušev. As part of the trade, the Clippers dealt a first-round pick, two second-round picks, a pick swap, and cash considerations to the 76ers, while sending a pick swap and cash considerations to the Oklahoma City Thunder.

== Career statistics ==
Legend
GP	Games played	GS	Games started	MPG	Minutes per game
FG%	Field goal percentage	3P%	3-point field goal percentage	FT%	Free throw percentage
RPG	Rebounds per game	APG	Assists per game	SPG	Steals per game
BPG	Blocks per game	PPG	Points per game	**Bold**	Career high

=== NBA ===
==== Regular season ====
Year	Team	GP	GS	MPG	FG%	3P%	FT%	RPG	APG	SPG	BPG	PPG
2013–14	Houston	7	0	4.8	.429	.364	—	.7	.0	.3	.0	2.3
2014–15	Philadelphia	70	49	27.9	.396	.374	.820	4.5	1.5	1.4	.4	13.5
2015–16	Philadelphia	67	49	28.4	.385	.353	.791	6.3	1.4	1.6	.6	12.8
2016–17	Philadelphia	67	67	31.6	.399	.333	.822	6.5	1.5	1.9	1.0	12.9
2017–18	Philadelphia	**80**	**80**	31.6	.413	.369	.853	5.4	2.0	1.7	.9	12.6
2018–19	Philadelphia	13	13	33.8	.427	.390	.739	5.2	1.1	1.8	1.8	11.3
2018–19	Minnesota	22	22	**34.7**	.433	.372	.773	5.7	1.5	**2.3**	1.1	**14.5**
2019–20	Minnesota	48	47	29.4	.435	.346	.798	6.0	1.2	1.7	.9	12.8
2019–20	Houston	22	21	33.0	.392	.315	.800	**8.0**	1.5	1.6	**2.2**	11.6
2020–21	Portland	70	70	32.0	.401	.379	.806	6.7	1.7	1.4	1.2	8.5
2021–22	Portland	48	40	29.8	.381	.343	.833	5.7	1.4	1.5	1.3	7.6
2021–22	L.A. Clippers	23	2	22.1	**.500**	**.450**	.848	5.1	1.0	1.3	1.2	10.4
2022–23	L.A. Clippers	48	0	16.2	.445	.397	.750	3.5	1.2	.8	.7	6.0
2023–24	L.A. Clippers	3	3	23.1	.333	.250	.500	2.7	**2.3**	2.0	1.0	3.0
2023–24	Philadelphia	26	3	16.1	.449	.354	**.875**	3.4	.7	1.3	.6	4.5
Career		614	466	28.2	.409	.362	.811	5.5	1.4	1.5	.9	10.8

==== Playoffs ====
Year	Team	GP	GS	MPG	FG%	3P%	FT%	RPG	APG	SPG	BPG	PPG
2018	Philadelphia	10	8	28.1	.325	.313	.750	5.3	**2.5**	1.1	.9	8.1
2020	Houston	**12**	**12**	31.6	.495	**.500**	.857	5.0	1.3	**2.5**	**1.1**	**11.2**
2021	Portland	6	6	**38.0**	**.500**	**.500**	**.900**	**7.8**	1.2	1.5	1.1	9.3
2023	L.A. Clippers	2	0	6.0	.000	.000	–	1.0	1.0	.0	.5	.0
Career		30	26	30.0	.424	.429	.818	5.4	1.7	1.7	1.0	9.0

=== College ===
Year	Team	GP	GS	MPG	FG%	3P%	FT%	RPG	APG	SPG	BPG	PPG
2009–10	Tennessee State	32	28	27.3	.428	.385	.797	6.5	1.2	1.1	1.1	11.5
2010–11	Tennessee State	30	30	30.8	.498	**.460**	.782	7.5	1.2	1.5	1.0	13.3
2011–12	Tennessee State	**33**	**32**	**31.2**	**.526**	.448	.775	7.9	**1.3**	1.5	1.4	**17.8**
2012–13	Tennessee State	23	21	31.0	.435	.388	**.850**	**8.0**	**1.3**	**2.2**	**1.7**	17.0
Career		118	111	30.0	.476	.422	.802	7.4	1.2	1.5	1.3	14.8

== Personal life ==
Covington is the son of Dennis and Teresa Bryant. Covington was in a relationship with German model and influencer Amirah Dyme, and on 8 March 2022, she gave birth to their first child together, a daughter named Harmony Faye. In 2025, he became a brother of Alpha Phi Alpha fraternity.

== Awards and achievements ==
NBA Awards:

- NBA All-Defensive First Team (2018)
- NBA Rising Star

NBA G League Awards:

- NBA G League All-Star (2014)
- NBA G League All-Star Game MVP (2014)
- All-NBA G League First Team (2014)
- NBA G League Rookie of the Year (2014)

== See also ==
- List of NBA single-game 3-point field goal leaders
