= Alsen, Louisiana =

Unincorporated community in Louisiana

- Unincorporated community
- Location within Louisiana Location within the United States
- Coordinates: 30°34′17″N 91°12′15″W
- Country: United States
- State: Louisiana
- Parish: East Baton Rouge
- Elevation: 72 ft (22 m)
- Time zone: UTC-6 (Central (CST))
  - Summer (DST): UTC-5 (CDT)
- ZIP code: 70807
- Area code: 225
- GNIS feature ID: 542924
- FIPS code: 22-01605

Alsen is an unincorporated community in East Baton Rouge Parish, Louisiana, United States. Established for freedmen, the community has been plagued by industrial pollution. The community is located less than 2 miles (3.2 kilometres) west of Baker and 6 miles (9.7 kilometres) southwest of Zachary and 2 miles (3.2 kilometres) east of the Mississippi River.

== History ==
The community was founded in 1872 by an agency of the United States Department of War known as the Freedmen's Bureau designed to help freedmen in the aftermath of the American Civil War.

Robaldson Field landfill is next to the community. The polluted Devil's Swamp is adjacent to the community. Stacy Kranitz made a documentary photographic series titled Fulcrum of Malice addressing the community and the industrial pollution surrounding it.

== Notable people ==
- Jeremy Richardson, an NBA basketball player.
- Henry Gray, blues piano player and singer.
