= Stacy Kranitz =

American photographer (born 1976)

- Born: March 7, 1976 (age 49); Frankfort, Kentucky, U.S.
- Education: New York University (BA); University of California, Irvine (MA)
- Occupation: Documentary photographer
- Awards: Pulitzer Prize for Public Service (2025)
- Website: stacykranitz.com

Stacy Kranitz (born 7 March 1976) is an American photographer who works in the documentary tradition and lives in the Appalachian Mountains of eastern Tennessee. She has made long-term personal projects about the Appalachian region and worked as an assignment photographer for magazines and newspapers. Kranitz's work is held in the collections of the Museum of Fine Arts, Houston and Harvard Art Museums, and she was a recipient of the 2025 Pulitzer Prize for Public Service for her photojournalism work for ProPublica.

== Early life and education ==
Kranitz was born in Frankfort, Kentucky, USA. She earned a BA at New York University Gallatin School of Individualized Study and a MA at the University of California, Irvine.

== Career ==
Since studying she has worked as an assignment photographer for magazines and newspapers such as National Geographic, Vanity Fair and The Atlantic.

Since 2009 Kranitz has been documenting the Appalachian region of America, whose inhabitants have been typecast as "down-and-out or undignified". She "lives in Appalachia and creates images from her perspective as a participant-observer, immersing herself in the lives of the individuals depicted."

The series From The Study on Post-Pubescent Manhood shows young men at a dystopian compound in the Southern Ohio Appalachian region. Kranitz turns the "reckless, juvenile behavior [. . .] into activities imbued with symbolic importance, icons of social freedom. The lives and actions portrayed by her subjects are therefore simultaneously repellent and attractive."

The series As it Was Give(n) to Me, made in Kentucky, North Carolina, Tennessee and Virginia is "a dialogue about stereotypes: the mythology they create, their value and their role in society." "Rather than portraying Appalachia as poverty-stricken or selectively focusing on its positive aspects, she sought to capture the complexity of rural, working-class life from a nuanced viewpoint."

She did a series of documentary photographs titled Fulcrum of Malice depicting sights around Alsen, Louisiana near Baton Rouge. The area, referred to as "cancer alley" is surrounded by industrial pollution. Kranitz states the series "asks us to acknowledge our complicit role in systemic racism through our dependence on plastics and petroleum." A documentary arts collection award was given for it.

== Publications ==
- The Louisiana Cockfighters Manual. New York: self-published, 2010. Edition of 100 copies.
- From the Study on Post-Pubescent Manhood. Canada: Straylight, 2013. Edition of 100 copies.
- Speak Your Piece. Here, 2016. ISBN 978-0993585333. Edition of 300 copies.
- The Great Divide. Lightworks, 2017. With Zoe Strauss. 64-page zine.
- As it Was Give(n) to Me. Twin Palms, 2022. ISBN 978-1-936611-19-5.

== Awards ==
- 2015: Time's Instagram Photographer of the Year
- 2020: Guggenheim Fellowship from the John Simon Guggenheim Memorial Foundation
- 2025: Pulitzer Prize for Public Service, with Kavitha Surana, Lizzie Presser, and Cassandra Jaramillo for ProPublica

== Collections ==
Kranitz's work is held in the following permanent collections:

- Museum of Fine Arts, Houston, TX: 3 prints (as of 3 July 2022)
- Harvard Art Museums, Cambridge, Massachusetts: 7 prints (as of 3 July 2022)
