= Jeremy Richardson =

American basketball player (born 1984)

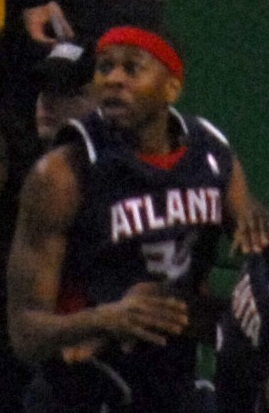
- Richardson with the Atlanta Hawks in 2008

Personal information
- Born: March 1, 1984 (age 42) Alsen, Louisiana, U.S.
- Listed height: 6 ft 7 in (2.01 m)
- Listed weight: 210 lb (95 kg)

Career information
- High school: Zachary (Zachary, Louisiana)
- College: Copiah-Lincoln CC (2002–2004); Delta State (2004–2006)
- NBA draft: 2006: undrafted
- Playing career: 2006–2014
- Position: Small forward / shooting guard
- Number: 32, 3, 23

Career history
- 2006–2007: Fort Worth Flyers
- 2007: Atlanta Hawks
- 2007: Portland Trail Blazers
- 2007–2008: Fort Wayne Mad Ants
- 2007–2008: Memphis Grizzlies
- 2008: San Antonio Spurs
- 2008: Atlanta Hawks
- 2008–2009: Orlando Magic
- 2009–2010: Aris Thessaloniki
- 2010–2011: Power Electronics Valencia
- 2011–2012: BC Armia
- 2012–2014: Sidigas Avellino

Career highlights
- NBA D-League All-Star (2008); NBA D-League All-Star Game MVP (2008); All-NBA D-League Second Team (2007)
- Stats at NBA.com
- Stats at Basketball Reference

Jeremy Terrell Richardson (born March 1, 1984) is an American former professional basketball player. He is a 6'7", 210 lb. swingman who played in the National Basketball Association (NBA) with the Atlanta Hawks, Portland Trail Blazers, Memphis Grizzlies, San Antonio Spurs and Orlando Magic.

== College career ==
Richardson was born in Alsen, Louisiana and graduated from Zachary High School in Louisiana in 2002. Prior to entering the NBA, he attended Copiah-Lincoln Community College for two years and transferred to the NCAA Division II Delta State University.

== Professional career ==
Richardson was selected with the ninth pick of the second round in the 2006 NBA D-League Draft by the Fort Worth Flyers. On January 27, 2007, he was signed to a ten-day contract by the Atlanta Hawks. Previously playing for the Flyers, it was the seventh call-up from the D-League during the 2006–07 season. After his second 10-day contract expired, the Hawks opted not to retain him.

In March 2007, he was signed to a 10-day contract by the Portland Trail Blazers. At the end of the contract, the Blazers cut him; he played in one game for them. Richardson returned to the Flyers afterwards.

Richardson was selected in the first round (second overall) of the 2007 D-League expansion draft by the Fort Wayne Mad Ants.

Richardson spent the 2007-08 NBA preseason with the Miami Heat but was waived on October 29, 2007. On December 20, 2007, he was signed by the Memphis Grizzlies. Until then he was averaging 28.5 points, 6.6 rebounds, 1.8 assists and 1.63 steals in 41.5 minutes in eight games for the Mad Ants. He was named D-League.com Performer of the Week, after averaging 35 points, 6.5 rebounds, and 4.0 assists in two games during the week of December 3, shooting 53.2% from the field (25/47), including scoring a league season-high 40 points against the Iowa Energy on November 29. He was waived on January 7, and signed three days later with the San Antonio Spurs.

In 2008, Richardson was named MVP of the D-League All Star Game, scoring 22 points on 9/15 shooting. Shortly afterwards, he was signed to another 10-day contract by the Atlanta Hawks. Richardson in the 2008 offseason was signed by the Orlando Magic. On December 8 he received a 3.5 million dollar bonus.

In August 2009, he joined the Greek League club Aris Thessaloniki where he averaged 12.2 points and 3.3 rebounds per game. In September 2010 he signed a one-year contract with the Spanish club Power Electronics Valencia.

In August 2011, he signed with BC Armia in Georgia. In August 2012, he joined Sidigas Avellino in Italy. In September 2013, he re-signed with Avellino for one more season.

In July 2014, he signed a one-year deal with Enel Brindisi. He parted ways with club before the start of the new season, because of personal reasons.

== NBA career statistics ==
Legend
GP	Games played	GS	Games started	MPG	Minutes per game
FG%	Field goal percentage	3P%	3-point field goal percentage	FT%	Free throw percentage
RPG	Rebounds per game	APG	Assists per game	SPG	Steals per game
BPG	Blocks per game	PPG	Points per game	**Bold**	Career high

=== Regular season ===
Year	Team	GP	GS	MPG	FG%	3P%	FT%	RPG	APG	SPG	BPG	PPG
2006–07	Atlanta	5	0	3.8	**.500**	**.667**	.000	**.4**	.0	**.2**	.0	1.6
2006–07	Portland	1	0	1.0	.000	.000	.000	.0	.0	.0	.0	.0
2007–08	Memphis	3	0	5.0	.000	.000	.000	.3	**.3**	.0	.0	.0
2007–08	San Antonio	5	**1**	5.8	.429	.400	**1.000**	.2	.2	**.2**	.0	2.0
2007–08	Atlanta	**19**	0	4.6	.419	.417	.000	.4	.0	.1	.0	1.6
2008–09	Orlando	12	0	**7.8**	.286	.353	.500	**1.2**	**.3**	.0	.0	**3.1**
Career		45	1	5.4	.333	.385	.625	.6	.1	.1	.0	1.9

=== Playoffs ===
Year	Team	GP	GS	MPG	FG%	3P%	FT%	RPG	APG	SPG	BPG	PPG
2008	Atlanta	**3**	0	**2.0**	**.250**	.000	.000	.0	.0	.0	.0	**.7**
2009	Orlando	1	0	**2.0**	.000	.000	.000	.0	.0	.0	.0	.0
Career		4	0	2.0	.200	.000	.000	.0	.0	.0	.0	.5
