= Brian Butch =

American basketball player (born 1984)

- Butch with the Wisconsin Badgers in 2004

Personal information
- Born: December 22, 1984 (age 41) Appleton, Wisconsin, U.S.
- Listed height: 6 ft 11 in (2.11 m)
- Listed weight: 240 lb (109 kg)

Career information
- High school: Appleton West (Appleton, Wisconsin)
- College: Wisconsin (2004–2008)
- NBA draft: 2008: undrafted
- Playing career: 2008–2017
- Position: Center
- Number: 32, 44
- Coaching career: 2017–2019

Career history

Playing
- 2008: Jiangsu Dragons
- 2008–2009: Giants Nördlingen
- 2009: Ilisiakos
- 2009–2010: Bakersfield Jam
- 2011–2013: Bakersfield Jam
- 2013: Atléticos de San Germán
- 2013–2014: Bakersfield Jam
- 2014: Fort Wayne Mad Ants
- 2014: Meralco Bolts
- 2015–2016: Toshiba Brave Thunders Kanagawa
- 2017: Rizing Zephyr Fukuoka

Coaching
- 2017–2019: Wisconsin Herd (assistant)

Career highlights
- NBA D-League All-Star (2010); NBA D-League All-Star Game MVP (2010); All-NBA D-League First Team (2013); All-NBA D-League Second Team (2010); NBA D-League Impact Player of the Year (2010); Honorable Mention All-Big Ten (2008); McDonald's All-American (2003); First-team Parade All-American (2003); Wisconsin Mr. Basketball (2003)
- Stats at NBA.com
- Stats at Basketball Reference
Medals
Men's basketball
Representing United States
Pan American Games
Bronze medal – third place	2011 Guadalajara	National team

Brian Butch (born December 22, 1984) is an American former professional basketball player. He is currently working mornings on 97.3 the Game with Steve Czaban in Milwaukee and as a radio color commentator for the Wisconsin Badgers men's basketball and analyst for the Big Ten Network. He was a center on the 2003 McDonald's All-American basketball team and later attended the University of Wisconsin–Madison on a basketball scholarship. He was briefly a member of the Denver Nuggets of the NBA, although he never played any games for them.

== High school career ==
At Appleton West High School, Butch was a two-time Wisconsin State Player of the Year by the Associated Press. He averaged 22.8 points and 10.1 rebounds as a senior, leading Appleton West High School to a 23–3 record and the Division 1 State Championship game in 2003. Butch is also Appleton West's all-time leading scorer with 1,431 points. He broke a 35-year-old Wisconsin state tournament record by scoring 45 points in the quarterfinals, which was held at the University of Wisconsin–Madison's Kohl Center. Butch averaged 30.8 points in four games at the Kohl Center over his prep career.

Butch was later named a 2003 McDonald's All-American ("West" squad) where he shared the court with players such as LeBron James and Luol Deng. He scored 6 points and grabbed 7 rebounds in the nationally televised contest.

== Collegiate career ==
Butch elected to redshirt his freshman year.

As a redshirt-freshman, Butch played in 27 games, averaging 9.7 minutes, 3.6 points, 2.5 rebounds, 0.2 assists, and 0.3 blocks. He missed six games with mononucleosis. He scored his then career-high 12 points versus Northwestern University and grabbed a career-high 9 rebounds versus University of North Carolina at Greensboro. Butch was named academic All-Big Ten.

As a redshirt-sophomore, Butch played in 31 games, averaging 9.9 points, 6.0 rebounds, 1.4 assists, and 0.8 blocks. He scored a career-high 23 points and grabbed career high 12 rebounds vs. Penn State in the same game.

As a redshirt-junior, Butch played in 30 games before severely dislocating his elbow in a 49–48 loss to Ohio State on February 25, 2007. For the season, he averaged 8.8 points, 5.9 rebounds, 0.58 assists, and 0.5 blocks. He increased his career-high scoring mark to 27 points on December 16, 2006, in an 89–75 win versus then-ranked #2 University of Pittsburgh. The Big Ten conferences coaches selected Butch as All-Big Ten Honorable Mention.

As a senior, Brian Butch played in 36 games. For the season he averaged 12.4 points, 6.6 rebounds, 0.8 assists and 0.8 blocks per game.

Butch was selected for USA Pan-American game trials in 2006.

== Professional career ==
After going undrafted in the 2008 NBA draft, Butch joined the Memphis Grizzlies for the 2008 NBA Summer League. He later signed with Jiangsu Dragons of China. He left Jiangsu in November after just 2 games. In December 2008, he signed with Giants Nördlingen of Germany. Throughout the 2008–09 season with the Giants, he played 20 games averaging 10.6 points and 5.5 rebounds.

In 2009, Butch signed with Ilisiakos of Greece. He played in 3 games averaging 14 points and 5.3 rebounds. He left in November 2009.

In December 2009, Butch was acquired by the Bakersfield Jam of the NBA Development League. As the Jam's starting center, Butch was named an NBA D-League All Star. Coming off the bench, he was named the 2010 All-Star Game's Most Valuable Player.

On April 11, 2010, Butch signed with the Denver Nuggets. On August 15, 2010, he was waived by Nuggets before playing in a game for them. Later that year, he re-joined Nuggets for the 2010 NBA Summer League. However, he sustained a season-ending injury in a game against the Lakers, forcing him to sit out the entire 2010–11 season.

In November 2011, he was re-acquired by the Jam for the 2011–12 season. On December 9, 2011, he signed with the New Orleans Hornets. He was later waived by the Hornets on December 23. He re-joined the Jam in March 2012.

He joined the Milwaukee Bucks for the 2012 NBA Summer League. On September 24, 2012, Butch signed with the Utah Jazz. However, he was waived on October 18. In November 2012, he was re-acquired by the Jam for the 2012–13 season.

In April 2013, he joined Atléticos de San Germán of Puerto Rico. He left in May after playing in 2 games.

In November 2013, he was re-acquired by the Jam for the 2013–14 season. On February 3, 2014, he was traded to the Fort Wayne Mad Ants.

On February 27, 2014, the Mad Ants bought out Butch's contract. The same day, he signed with the Meralco Bolts of the Philippine Basketball Association as an import for the 2014 PBA Commissioner's Cup.

In July 2015, Butch signed with Toshiba Brave Thunders of Japan for the 2015–16 season.

== Coaching career ==
Brian Butch served as an assistant coach for the Wisconsin Herd

== Achievements and awards ==
- 2001–2002 Wisconsin High School AP Player of the Year
- 2002–2003 Wisconsin State Tournament Division 1 single game scoring record with 45 points in the quarterfinals
- 2002–2003 Wisconsin High School AP Player of the Year
- 2002–2003 Wisconsin Mr. Basketball presented by the Wisconsin Basketball Coaches Association
- 2002–2003 McDonald's All-American
- 2004–2005 Academic All-Big Ten
- 2006–2007 All-Big Ten Coaches Honorable Mention
- 2007–2008 Consensus All-Big Ten First Team Selection
- 2007–2008 Big Ten Champions
- 2007–2008 Big Ten Tournament Champions
- 2010 NBA D-League All-Star Game MVP
- 2013 All-NBA D-League First Team
