= Blake Ahearn =

American basketball player and coach (born 1984)

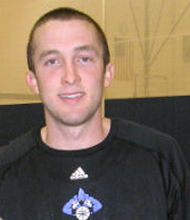
- Ahearn in 2007

Chicago Bulls
- Title: Assistant coach
- League: NBA

Personal information
- Born: May 27, 1984 (age 42) St. Louis, Missouri, U.S.
- Listed height: 6 ft 2 in (1.88 m)
- Listed weight: 190 lb (86 kg)

Career information
- High school: De Smet Jesuit (Creve Coeur, Missouri)
- College: Missouri State (2003–2007)
- NBA draft: 2007: undrafted
- Playing career: 2007–2015
- Position: Point guard
- Number: 6, 18, 2
- Coaching career: 2015–present

Career history

Playing
- 2007–2008: Dakota Wizards
- 2008: Miami Heat
- 2008: San Antonio Spurs
- 2008: →Austin Toros
- 2008–2009: Dakota Wizards
- 2009: Estudiantes Madrid
- 2010: Bakersfield Jam
- 2010–2011: Erie BayHawks
- 2010: Teramo Basket
- 2011–2012: Reno Bighorns
- 2012: Utah Jazz
- 2012–2013: Dongguan Leopards
- 2013–2014: Budivelnyk Kyiv
- 2015: Capitanes de Arecibo
- 2015: Santa Cruz Warriors

Coaching
- 2015–2016: Clayton HS
- 2016–2017: De Smet Jesuit HS
- 2017–2020: Austin Spurs
- 2020–2024: Memphis Grizzlies (assistant)
- 2026–present: Chicago Bulls

Career highlights
- As player: Ukrainian SuperLeague champion (2014); Ukrainian Cup champion (2014); NBA D-League champion (2015); NBA D-League All-Star MVP (2009); 2× All-NBA D-League First Team (2009, 2012); All-NBA D-League Second Team (2008); NBA D-League Rookie of the Year (2008); 2× First-team All-MVC (2006, 2007); MVC Freshman of the Year (2004); As coach: NBA G League champion (2018)
- Stats at NBA.com
- Stats at Basketball Reference
Medals
Men's basketball
Representing United States
Pan American Games
Bronze medal – third place	2011 Guadalajara	National team

Daniel Blake Ahearn (born May 27, 1984) is an American professional basketball coach and former player who is an assistant coach for the Chicago Bulls of the National Basketball Association (NBA). He played college basketball for Missouri State.

== High school career ==
Ahearn attended De Smet Jesuit High School in St. Louis, Missouri. He played three years of varsity. He averaged 17.7 points per game as a junior and 18.5 as a senior. He was an All-Metro Selection his junior and senior years and an All-State selection his junior year. In his junior year, he broke his hand in the divisional semifinal game. He was unable to play for the duration of his junior year. His team was state runner-up his junior year losing to Missouri powerhouse Vashon High School in the state championship game.

== College career ==
Ahearn played collegiately for the Missouri State Bears from 2003 to 2007. He was poised to finish his career with four straight NCAA free-throw titles but failed, and finished with an accuracy of 92.5% during his senior year. He finished his college career as a 94.6% free throw shooter, 435 for 460, all-time best percentage. He also holds a single-season record at 97.5%. He made 60 consecutive free-throws twice in his career (December 20, 2003, through February 14, 2004, and December 19, 2004, to February 26, 2005) which are school and Missouri Valley Conference records. He missed his final attempt against the San Diego State Aztecs in the NIT on March 24, 2007, his final college game. He holds the record for career three-pointers at Missouri State with 276 and was selected the Missouri Valley Conference (MVC) Freshman of the Year (2004), also being a two-time all-MVC first teamer (2006 and 2007). He came within one game each season of making the NCAA tournament but failed to reach any. His team lost in double overtime to Northern Iowa in the MVC Tournament finals his freshman year and to Creighton in the MVC finals his sophomore year. His team was rated 21st in the RPI his junior year and 33rd his senior year, which included a win over #7 in the nation Wisconsin.

In 2016, he was inducted into the Missouri State University Athletics Hall of Fame.

== Professional career ==
=== 2007–08 season ===
==== NBA D-League ====
In the 2007–2008 season, Ahearn played with the NBA Development League's Dakota Wizards. He worked his way to the starting lineup, averaging 19 points, with a 96% free-throw percentage, shooting 49% from the field and 44% from 3-point range in 41 games.

==== NBA ====
On March 21, 2008, Ahearn was signed to a 10-day contract by the NBA's Miami Heat, whose roster had been depleted by injuries. On March 27, Ahearn scored a team-high 15 points in a loss to the Detroit Pistons.

On April 10, Ahearn was named the Rookie of the Year of the D-League and All-NBA Development League Second Team.

=== 2008–09 season ===
Despite posting a solid NBA preseason during which he averaged 8 points per game, Ahearn was cut by the Minnesota Timberwolves on October 23, 2008. After being waived by the Timberwolves he joined the Dakota Wizards. On November 16, Ahearn was signed by the San Antonio Spurs becoming the 2008–09 season's first D-League call-up. Ahearn was in camp with the Wizards prior to signing with the Spurs. On November 30, Ahearn was assigned to the Spurs' D-League affiliate Austin Toros.

The Spurs waived Ahearn on December 15, 2008, and he re-joined the Dakota Wizards. He was selected to play in the D-League All-Star Game on February 14, 2009, where he was awarded MVP alongside Courtney Sims.

=== 2009–10 season ===
The following season Ahearn signed a contract with Estudiantes Madrid in Spain, until he moved back and played for the Bakersfield Jam and for the Erie BayHawks in the NBA Development League.

=== 2010–11 season ===
On August 1, Ahearn signed a contract with the Italian team Teramo Basket but he was waived after a few games.

On December 29, he re-signed with the Erie BayHawks.

=== 2011–12 season ===
Blake started the 2011–12 season participating for the United States Basketball Team in the 2011 Pan American Games. The United States won the bronze medal with a win over the Dominican Republic in the Medal Rounds. Blake was second on the team in scoring, averaging 10 points per game, including a team-high 21 points vs Brazil in round robin play.

After the games, Blake signed with the Erie Bayhawks in the NBA Development League. On draft day Blake was traded to the Reno Bighorns.

Blake attended training camp with the Los Angeles Clippers during the first part of the D-League season. He then returned to the Bighorns.

During the 2011–12 season Blake led the NBA-D League in scoring at 23.8 points per game He was selected to play in the D-League All-Star Game and had 21 points and 8 assists during the game. Blake also set the NBA and NBA D-League mark of 110 consecutive free throws during his season in Reno, which still stands as the second-best streak in professional Basketball, only behind John Wooden at 134. Blake set the all-time career points record for the NBA Development league in 2012.

On April 10, the Utah Jazz signed Blake Ahearn to a 10-day contract. On April 20, he was signed for the remainder of the season.

=== 2012–13 season ===
In September 2012, Ahearn signed with the Indiana Pacers of the NBA. On October 22, 2012, Ahearn was waived by the Indiana Pacers.

In December 2012, he signed with the Dongguan Leopards of the CBA.

=== 2013–14 season ===
On August 12, 2013, Ahearn signed with Budivelnyk Kyiv.

=== 2014–15 season ===
On December 18, 2014, Ahearn signed with Capitanes de Arecibo for the 2015 BSN season. However, he left the club in February 2015 after appearing in just three games.

On March 11, 2015, he was acquired by the Santa Cruz Warriors. On April 26, he won the D-League championship with the Warriors.

== Coaching career ==
In 2015, Ahearn became head boys' coach at Clayton High School in Clayton, Missouri. Following a 7–17 season there he was hired to coach his alma mater, De Smet Jesuit.

On August 1, 2017, Ahearn was named the head coach of the Austin Spurs of the NBA G League.

On June 20, 2020, the Memphis Grizzlies announced that they had hired Ahearn as assistant coach.

On July 14, 2026, the Chicago Bulls hired Ahearn to serve as an assistant coach under head coach Tiago Splitter.

== Career statistics ==
Legend
GP	Games played	GS	Games started	MPG	Minutes per game
FG%	Field goal percentage	3P%	3-point field goal percentage	FT%	Free throw percentage
RPG	Rebounds per game	APG	Assists per game	SPG	Steals per game
BPG	Blocks per game	PPG	Points per game	**Bold**	Career high
†	Won an NBA championship	*	Led the league	‡	NBA record

=== NBA ===
==== Regular season ====
Year	Team	GP	GS	MPG	FG%	3P%	FT%	RPG	APG	SPG	BPG	PPG
2007–08	Miami	**12**	0	**14.8**	.263	.294	.968	**1.6**	**1.6**	**.5**	.0	**5.8**
2008–09	San Antonio	3	0	6.3	**.333**	**.500**	**1.000**	.3	.7	.3	.0	2.7
2011–12	Utah	4	0	7.5	.286	.222	.000	.5	.3	.0	.0	2.5
Career		19	0	11.9	.273	.298	.970	1.2	1.2	.4	.0	4.6

==== Playoffs ====
Year	Team	GP	GS	MPG	FG%	3P%	FT%	RPG	APG	SPG	BPG	PPG
2012	Utah	3	0	2.7	.667	1.000	.000	.0	.7	.0	.0	1.7
Career		3	0	2.7	.667	1.000	.000	.0	.7	.0	.0	1.7

=== NBA D-League ===
==== Regular season ====
Year	Team	GP	GS	MPG	FG%	3P%	FT%	RPG	APG	SPG	BPG	PPG
2007–08	Dakota	**41**	15	29.4	**.486**	.439	.960*	2.0	3.5	.7	.0	19.0
2008–09	Austin	6	6	34.3	.444	**.531**	.914*	2.3	6.0	.8	.0	18.8
2008–09	Dakota	**41**	**41**	38.7	.445	.420	.957*	2.4	5.0	.7	.0	22.7
2009–10	Bakersfield	17	10	32.8	.367	.277	.932*	2.1	4.1	**1.2**	.1	14.3
2009–10	Erie	13	13	**45.1**	.433	.440	.961*	**4.5**	**6.7**	**1.2**	**.3**	**25.7**
2010–11	Erie	31	25	33.7	.406	.354	**.962***	2.7	5.8	1.1	.2	16.9
2011–12	Reno	37	37	37.5	.469	.409	**.962***	3.5	5.1	1.1	.1	23.8
2014–15†	Santa Cruz	9	0	21.2	.397	.375	.944	1.9	2.7	.7	.0	9.6
Career		195	147	34.7	.444	.404	.956‡	2.5	4.8	.9	.1	19.9

=== Domestic leagues statistics ===
Season	Team	League	GP	MPG	FG%	3PT FG%	FT%	RPG	APG	SPG	BPG	PPG
2009–10	CB Estudiantes	Liga ACB	13	25.1	.294	.414	.983	1.1	.8	.7	.1	14.2
2010–11	Teramo Basket	Lega A	6	24.5	.286	.345	1.000	1.7	1.3	.5	.0	9.3
2012–13	Dongguan Leopards	CBA	17	28.6	.468	.333	.905	3.1	3.4	.9	.0	23.0
2013–14	BC Budivelnyk	SuperLeague	20	24.8	.449	.383	.853	1.7	3.2	.7	.2	11.6

=== International statistics ===
Season	Team	League	GP	MPG	FG%	3PT FG%	FT%	RPG	APG	SPG	BPG	PPG
2013–14	BC Budivelnyk	Euroleague	9	20.8	.378	.361	.905	1.6	1.7	.0	.1	9.6
2013–14	BC Budivelnyk	EuroCup	10	23.7	.525	.457	.978	1.5	2.6	.6	.0	15.0
2014–15	Capitanes de Arecibo	Americas League	3	25.0	.125	.316	.750	2.0	2.3	1.0	.0	8.7

== Personal life ==
Ahearn is the son of Daniel and Erin Ahearn. His dad played basketball at Washburn University. Ahearn and his wife had their first child in 2012. The couple has three kids.
