= Courtney Sims =

American basketball player (born 1983)

Personal information
- Born: October 21, 1983 (age 43) Roslindale, Massachusetts, U.S.
- Listed height: 6 ft 11 in (2.11 m)
- Listed weight: 245 lb (111 kg)

Career information
- High school: Noble & Greenough School (Dedham, Massachusetts)
- College: Michigan (2003–2007)
- NBA draft: 2007: undrafted
- Playing career: 2007–2018
- Position: Center
- Number: 44, 4

Career history
- 2007: Indiana Pacers
- 2008–2011: Iowa Energy
- 2009: Phoenix Suns
- 2009: New York Knicks
- 2009–2010: CSKA Moscow
- 2010: Capitanes de Arecibo
- 2010: Spirou Charleroi
- 2011: Dongguan Leopards
- 2011–2012: VEF Rīga
- 2012–2013: Jeonju KCC Egis
- 2013–2015: Seoul SK Knights
- 2015–2016: Busan KT Sonicboom
- 2016: Seoul SK Knights
- 2018: SeaHorses Mikawa

Career highlights
- NBA D-League Most Valuable Player (2009); 2× NBA D-League All-Star MVP (2009, 2011); All-NBA D-League First Team (2009)
- Stats at NBA.com
- Stats at Basketball Reference

Courtney Sims (born October 21, 1983) is an American former professional basketball player. He is a 6-foot-11-inch (211 cm) center. He now runs the basketball program Team Sims Basketball located in Sandwich, Massachusetts.

== Early career ==
Sims played his college ball at the University of Michigan, graduating in 2007, and previously attended the Noble & Greenough School for his high school education. With the Wolverines, he averaged 9.5 points and 5.5 rebounds in his four-year career.

== Professional career ==
Sims played briefly for the NBA's Indiana Pacers in 2007–08. Signed to a non-guaranteed contract after going undrafted, he appeared in only two games for the Pacers before being waived on December 4, 2007. He was signed again on December 12, and waived again on December 19. Going scoreless in three total games, he had one rebound, one assist and committed two personal fouls in eleven minutes of action. On February 25, 2008, Sims was acquired by the NBA Development League's Iowa Energy. He played for the New Orleans Hornets during the 2008–09 NBA pre-season. With the Energy, he registered a rare triple-double on November 28, 2008, in a 113–101 win over the Sioux Falls Skyforce with 22 points, 17 rebounds and 11 blocked shots. On December 28, he scored a season-high 36 points, including 13 in the last quarter, to go along with 16 rebounds in a 107–101 victory over the Utah Flash. On January 20, 2009, the Phoenix Suns officially announced they signed Sims to a 10-day contract. He was signed to a second ten-day contract on February 14, but was released by the Arizona club upon the expiration of this contract, as the third would immediately mean his signing until the end of the season. Sims signed another ten-day contract on March 23, 2009, this time with the New York Knicks, and signed a second on April 2. On December 27 he was signed by CSKA Moscow until the end of season with a club option to terminate the contract after one-month trial period. On January 12, 2010, Sims was replaced in CSKA's lineup by Pops Mensah-Bonsu.

Sims then returned to the Iowa Energy, but then bought out his contract so that he could play in Puerto Rico for the Capitanes de Arecibo.

Sims was invited to attend the Denver Nuggets 2010 pre-season training camp, but was waived on October 11.

Sims signed with the Iowa Energy prior to the beginning of the 2010-11 NBA Development League Season. In the 2011 D-League All-star game, he scored 25 points and had 6 rebounds to earn the game MVP honors.

In March 2011 he signed with the Dongguan Leopards in China.

In September 2011 he signed a one-year deal with BK VEF Rīga.

In July 2012 he signed a one-year deal with Jeonju KCC Egis.

== NBA career statistics ==
Legend
GP	Games played	GS	Games started	MPG	Minutes per game
FG%	Field goal percentage	3P%	3-point field goal percentage	FT%	Free throw percentage
RPG	Rebounds per game	APG	Assists per game	SPG	Steals per game
BPG	Blocks per game	PPG	Points per game	**Bold**	Career high

=== Regular season ===
Year	Team	GP	GS	MPG	FG%	3P%	FT%	RPG	APG	SPG	BPG	PPG
2007–08	Indiana	**3**	0	3.7	.000	.000	.000	.7	**.3**	.0	.0	.0
2008–09	Phoenix	1	0	2.0	.000	.000	.000	.0	.0	.0	.0	.0
2008–09	New York	1	0	**11.0**	**.500**	.000	.000	**4.0**	.0	.0	.0	**6.0**
Career		5	0	4.8	.429	.000	.000	1.2	.2	.0	.0	1.2
