= NBA G League International Challenge =

- Founded: 2018
- First season: 2018 NBA G League International Challenge
- Folded: 2019
- Number of teams: 6
- Last champions: (Germany) Bayern Munich (1st title)
- Most championships: (United States) Team USA (1 title) (Germany) Bayern Munich (1 title)

The NBA G League International Challenge was an international professional basketball tournament featuring all-star selections of the NBA G League. Its purpose is to allow players from the National Basketball Association (NBA)'s development league to play games against clubs, league all-star selections, and national teams from around the world.

The games themselves are played under FIBA rules, which differ slightly from the NBA's rules. The basketball court's markings and dimensions also slightly differ.

== History ==
The first NBA G League International Challenge was the 2018 edition. It featured an all-star selection of NBA G League players coached by Jeff Van Gundy, that made up Team USA's 2019 FIBA World Cup Americas qualifiers team at the time, versus the senior men's Mexican national basketball team. Team USA won the game, by a score of 88–67. The 2019 edition of the tournament expanded the format to 6 teams, and was won by the German EuroLeague club Bayern Munich.

There has been no challenge since 2020.

== Results ==
Year	Champions	Second place	Third place	Fourth place	Results / Notes
2018; Details	United States	Mexico	N/A	N/A	88–67
2019; Details	(Germany); Bayern Munich	(United States); NBA G League Elite Team	Uruguay Elite Team	(Brazil); Flamengo Basketball	Final: 93–84; 3rd place game: 89–81

== Finals ==
2 February 2018

Boxscore

United States	88–67	Mexico

(United States) Los Angeles Convention Center, Los Angeles

22 September 2019

Boxscore

Bayern Munich (Germany)	93–84	(United States) NBA G League Elite Team

(Uruguay) Antel Arena, Montevideo
