= Trey (given name) =

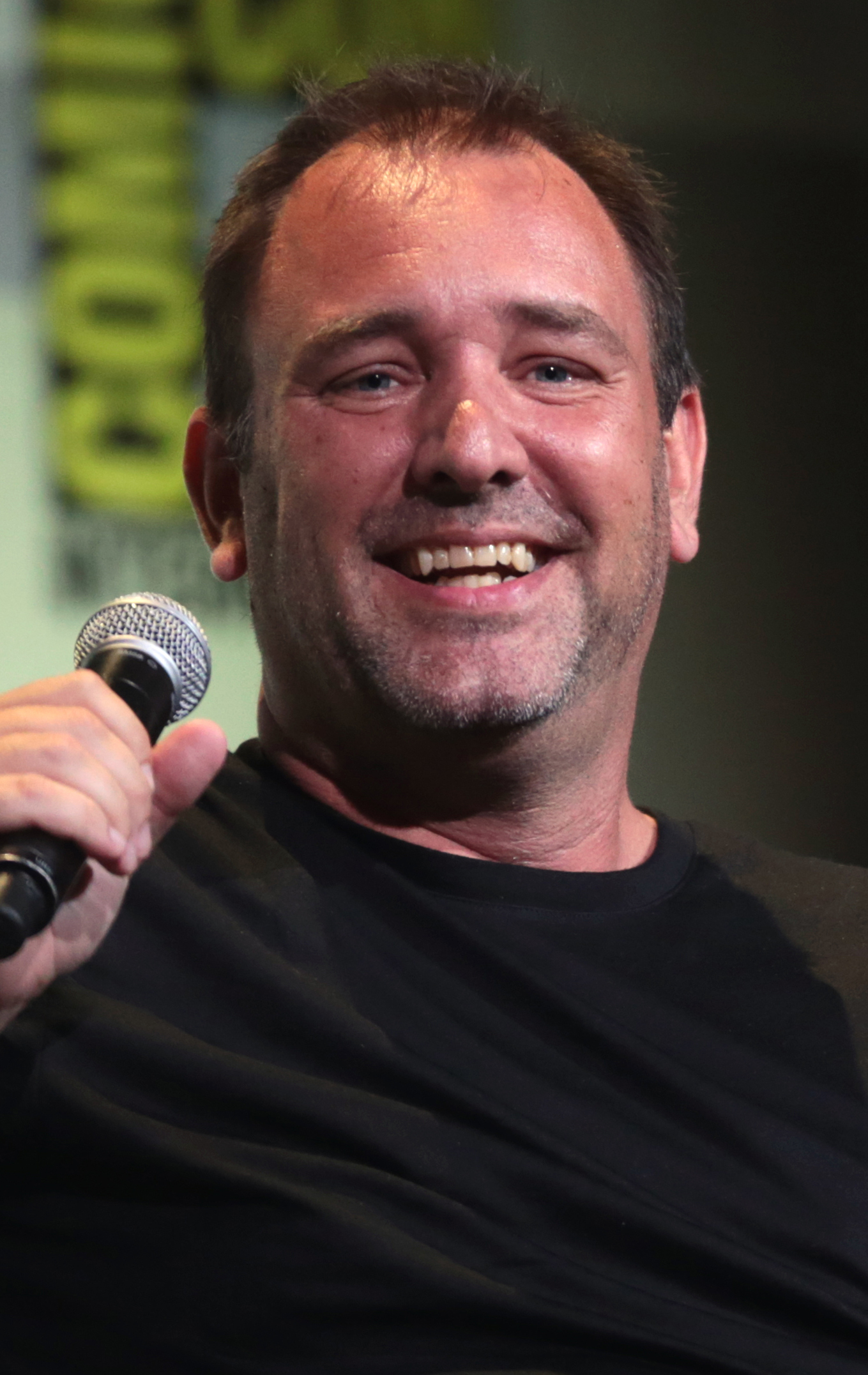
- Trey Parker in 2016
- Pronunciation: /træɪ/
- Gender: Male

Origin
- Meaning: Three

Other names
- Related names: Tray, Trae, Tre

Trey is a given name, as well as a nickname, often for people with the name suffix III. It is almost exclusively a masculine given name, with very rare exceptions. It may refer to:

== People ==
=== A ===
- Trey Adams (born 1997), American football player
- Trey Alexander (basketball) (born 2003), American basketball player
- Trey Allen (born 1974), American judge
- Trey Amos (born 2002), American football player
- Trey Amburgey (born 1994), American baseball player
- Trey Anastasio (born 1964), American musician
- Trey Anthony (born 1974), Canadian comedian and playwright
- Trey Augustine (born 2005), American ice hockey player

=== B ===
- Trey Ball (born 1994), American baseball player
- Trey Beamon (born 1974), American baseball player
- Trey Bender, American sportscaster
- Trey Benson (born 2002), American football player
- Trey Brewer, American bodybuilder
- Trey Britton (born 1989), American basketball player
- Trey Brown (born 1985), American football player
- Trey Brown (American football coach), American football coach
- Trey Bruce, American songwriter
- Trey Burke (born 1992), American basketball player
- Trey Burke (racing driver) (born 2004), American racing driver
- Trey Burton (born 1991), American football player

=== C ===
- Trey Cabbage (born 1997), American baseball player
- Trey Caldwell (born 1993), American football player
- Trey Caldwell (politician) (born 1988), American politician
- Trey Callaway, American film producer
- Trey Culver (born 1996), American athlete
- Trey Cunningham (born 1998), American hurdler

=== D ===
- Trey Darilek (born 1981), American football player
- Trey Dean (born 2000), American football player
- Trey DePriest (born 1993), American football player
- Trey Diller (born 1990), American football player
- Trey Dombroski (born 2001), American baseball player
- Trey Drechsel (born 1996), American basketball player

=== E ===
- Trey Ebanks (born 2000), Caymanian footballer
- Trey Edmunds (born 1994), American football player
- Trey Ellis (born 1962), American novelist

=== F ===
- Trey Fanjoy, American music video director
- Trey Martinez Fischer (born 1970), American politician
- Trey Fix-Wolansky (born 1999), Canadian ice hockey player
- Trey Flowers (born 1993), American football player
- Trey Freeman (born 1992), American basketball player

=== G ===
- Trey Galloway (born 2001), American basketball player
- Trey Gilder (born 1985), American basketball player
- Trey Gowdy (born 1964), American politician
- Trey Grayson (born 1972), American politician
- Trey Gregory-Alford (born 2006), American baseball player
- Trey Griffey (born 1994), American football player
- Trey Gunn (born 1960), American musician

=== H ===
- Trey Hardee (born 1984), American decathlete
- Trey Harris (born 1996), American baseball player
- Trey Haun (born 2006), American cyclist
- Trey Haverty (born 1981), American football coach
- Trey Henderson (born 1989), American football player
- Trey Hendrickson (born 1994), American football player
- Trey Hensley (born 1990), American singer-songwriter
- Trey Hilderbrand (born 2000), American tennis player
- Trey Hill (born 2000), American football player
- Trey Hillman (born 1963), American baseball manager
- Trey Hodges (born 1978), American baseball player
- Trey Hollingsworth (born 1983), American politician
- Trey Hopkins (born 1992), American football player
- Trey Hutchens (born 1998), American race car driver

=== I ===
- Trey Ideker, American professor

=== J ===
- Trey Jemison (born 1999), American basketball player
- Trey Johnson (born 1984), American basketball player
- Trey Junkin (born 1961), American football player

=== K ===
- Trey Kaufman-Renn (born 2002), American basketball player
- Trey Kell (born 1996), American basketball player
- Trey Kelley (born 1987), American politician
- Trey Kennedy (born 1992), American comedian
- Trey Knox (born 2001), American football player
- Trey Kramer (born 1988), American football player

=== L ===
- Trey Lamar (born 1980), American politician
- Trey Lance (born 2000), American football player
- Trey Landers (born 1998), American basketball player
- Trey Lee, Hong-Kong cellist
- Trey Lewis (disambiguation), multiple people
- Trey Lipscomb (born 2000), American baseball player
- Trey Lorenz (born 1969), American singer-songwriter
- Trey Lunsford (born 1979), American baseball player
- Trey Lyles (born 1995), Canadian basketball player

=== M ===
- Trey Mancini (born 1992), American baseball player
- Trey Marshall (born 1996), American football player
- Trey McBride (born 1999), American football player
- Trey McIntyre (born 1969), American dancer
- Trey McKenney (born 2006), American basketball player
- Trey McKinney-Jones (born 1990), American basketball player
- Trey Miguel (born 1994), American professional wrestler
- Trey Millard (born 1991), American football player
- Trey Mitchell (disambiguation), multiple people
- Trey Mooney (born 2002), Australian rugby league footballer
- Trey Moore (born 1972), American baseball player
- Trey Moore (American football) (born 2003), American football player
- Trey Moore (basketball) (born 1975), American basketball player
- Trey Mourning (born 1996), American basketball player
- Trey Mullinax (born 1992), American golfer
- Trey Murphy III (born 2000), American basketball player
- Trey Muse (born 1999), American soccer player

=== N ===
- Trey Nielsen (born 1991), American baseball player
- Trey Niemi (born 1998), Finnish basketball player
- Trey Nyoni (born 2007), English footballer

=== P ===
- Trey Palmer (born 2001), American football player
- Trey Parker (born 1969), American actor and comedian
- Trey Pearson, American singer-songwriter
- Trey Phillips (tennis) (born 1973), American tennis player
- Trey Pierce (born 2004), American football player
- Trey Pipkins (born 1996), American football player
- Trey Pollard (born 1982), American music producer

=== Q ===
- Trey Quinn (born 1995), American football player

=== R ===
- Trey Radel (born 1976), American politician
- Trey Ragas (born 1996), American football player
- Trey Ratcliff (born 1971), American photographer
- Trey Rhodes (born 1975), American politician
- Trey Rucker (born 2001), American football player
- Trey Ruscoe (born 2001), Australian rules footballer
- Trey Rutherford (born 1995), Canadian football player

=== S ===
- Trey Sermon (born 1999), American football player
- Trey Sheppard, American politician
- Trey Sherwood, American politician
- Trey Edward Shults (born 1988), American film producer
- Trey Smith (disambiguation), multiple people
- Trey Spruance (born 1969), American composer
- Trey Steimel, American politician
- Trey Stewart (born 1994), American politician
- Trey Stokes (born 1960), American filmmaker
- Trey Sweeney (born 2000), American baseball player

=== T ===
- Trey Taylor (born 2001), American football player
- Trey Taylor (ice hockey) (born 2002), Canadian hockey player
- Trey Teague (born 1974), American football player
- Trey Thompkins (born 1990), American basketball player
- Trey Townsend (born 2002), American basketball player
- Trey Traviesa (born 1969), American politician

=== V ===
- Trey Vaval (born 2000), American football player

=== W ===
- Trey Waltke (born 1955), American tennis player
- Trey Watts (born 1991), American football player
- Trey Wedig (born 2002), American football player
- Trey Wharton (born 1966), American politician
- Trey White (born 2004), American football player
- Trey Wingo (born 1963), American sportscaster
- Trey Williams (born 1992), American football player
- Trey Williams (musician), drummer of the American band Dying Fetus since 2007
- Trey Wilson (1948–1989), American actor
- Trey Wingenter (born 1994), American baseball player
- Trey Wolfe (born 1988), American football player
- Trey Wolff (born 2000), American football placekicker
- Trey Woodbury (born 1999), American basketball player

=== Y ===
- Trey Yesavage (born 2003), American baseball player
- Trey Yingst (born 1993), American reporter

=== Z ===
- Trey Zuhn III (born 2002), American football player

== Stage name ==
- Trey Azagthoth, guitarist for death metal band Morbid Angel
- Trey Songz (born 1984), American R&B singer, songwriter, record producer, rapper, and actor Tremaine "Trey" Neverson
- MC Trey, also known as Trey, Fijian-Australian vocalist, and hip-hop activist

== Fictional characters ==
- Trey, a hacker in the film Live Free or Die Hard
- Trey of Triforia, in the TV series Power Rangers: Zeo
- Trey Atwood, in the TV series The O.C.
- Trey Clover, in the mobile game Disney Twisted-Wonderland
- Trey Mitchell, on the soap opera General Hospital
- Trey Racer, in the manga and anime series Shaman King

== See also ==
- Tray (given name)
- Trae, given name
- Tre (given name)
