= Trey =

Trey may refer to:

== Places ==
- Trey, Switzerland, a commune in Vaud, Switzerland
- Trey Peaks, Coats Land, Antarctica

== Other uses ==
- Trey (given name), a list of people and fictional characters with the given name, nickname or stage name
- Trey (playing card), the Three in card games
- Trey, slang for a three-point shot in basketball
- Student Union of Tampere University (TREY), in Finland

== See also ==
- Trea (disambiguation)
- Trae, a list of people with the given name or nickname
- Tre (disambiguation)
- Tray (disambiguation)
