= Trea =

Trea may refer to:

== People ==
- Trea Pipkin (born 1980/81), American judge
- Trea Turner (born 1993), American baseball player
- Trea Wiltshire, Australian writer

== Others ==
- Trea Commune (Samraong District), Takéo Province, Cambodia

== See also ==
- Trae, a given name
- Trey (disambiguation)
- Tre (disambiguation)
- Tray (disambiguation)
