= 2014 NBA Summer League =

- League: National Basketball Association
- Sport: Basketball
- Duration: July 5–21, 2014
- Games: 92 total (between 4 and 8 for each team)
- Teams: 31
- TV partner: NBA TV

Orlando Pro Summer League
- Season champions: Philadelphia 76ers
- Runners-up: Memphis Grizzlies
- Season MVP: Elfrid Payton
- Top scorer: Kentavious Caldwell-Pope

Las Vegas NBA Summer League
- Season champions: Sacramento Kings
- Runners-up: Houston Rockets
- Top seed: Chicago Bulls
- Season MVP: Glen Rice Jr. (league); Ray McCallum (championship game)
- Top scorer: Glen Rice Jr.

NBA Summer League seasons
- ← 2013 2015 →

The 2014 NBA Summer League consisted of two pro basketball leagues organized by the NBA and the Orlando Magic just after the 2014 NBA draft. Ten teams took part in the week-long summer league at the Amway Center in Orlando, Florida, from July 5 to 11, 2014. The other summer league was the Las Vegas NBA Summer League, having taken place at the Thomas & Mack Center and Cox Pavilion in Paradise, Nevada (near Las Vegas) from July 11 to 21, 2014, with 23 NBA teams and the NBA D-League Select team participating. The Houston Rockets, Miami Heat and Philadelphia 76ers participated in both leagues.

The Philadelphia 76ers won the Orlando Pro Summer League Championship by defeating the Memphis Grizzlies in the title game, 91–75. Elfrid Payton was named the league's most valuable player.

The Sacramento Kings won the Las Vegas NBA Summer League Championship by defeating the Houston Rockets in the title game, 77–68. Glen Rice Jr. of the Washington Wizards was named the league's most valuable player. Ray McCallum of the Kings was named the most valuable player of the championship game.

== Orlando Pro Summer League ==
Pursuant to a sponsorship agreement with Southwest Airlines Co., the official name of the league is the Southwest Orlando Pro Summer League in 2014. All games were played on the Orlando Magic's practice court in the Amway Center, not on the main basketball court at the venue. Tickets for the games were not sold to the general public.

=== Teams ===
- Orlando Magic (host)
- Boston Celtics
- Brooklyn Nets
- Detroit Pistons
- Houston Rockets
- Indiana Pacers
- Memphis Grizzlies
- Miami Heat
- Oklahoma City Thunder
- Philadelphia 76ers

=== Schedule ===
All times are in Eastern Daylight Time (UTC−4)

==== Day 1 ====
NBA TV

July 5
9:00 am

Boxscore

Brooklyn Nets 101, Indiana Pacers 81
Scoring by quarter: 29–11, 27–16, 24–29, 21–25
Pts: Mason Plumlee 23; Rebs: Cory Jefferson 9 Asts: Marquis Teague 6	Pts: Donald Sloan 21; Rebs: Kevin Jones 8 Asts: Donald Sloan 3

Amway Center, Orlando, Florida
Referees: Steven Anderson, Kelly Pfeifer, Isaac Barnett

NBA TV

July 5
11:00 am

Boxscore

Miami Heat 77, Boston Celtics 85
Scoring by quarter: 21–20, 17–15, 16–23, 23–27
Pts: James Ennis 18; Rebs: Benimon, Hamilton 9 each Asts: Larry Drew 4	Pts: Kelly Olynyk 20; Rebs: Kelly Olynyk 8 Asts: Phil Pressey 7

Amway Center, Orlando, Florida
Referees: Bill Kennedy, Ben Taylor, Jacyn Goble, JB DeRosa

NBA TV

July 5
1:00 pm

Boxscore

Orlando Magic 83, Philadelphia 76ers 77
Scoring by quarter: 22–23, 24–20, 19–14, 18–20
Pts: Victor Oladipo 18; Rebs: Victor Oladipo 6 Asts: Elfrid Payton 5	Pts: Nerlens Noel 19; Rebs: Hollis Thompson 14; Asts: Hollis Thompson 5

Amway Center, Orlando, Florida
Referees: Marques Pettigrew, Aaron Smith, Karl Lane, Brent Barnaky, Bharat Ramanan

NBA TV

July 5
3:00 pm

Boxscore

Detroit Pistons 95, Houston Rockets 89
Scoring by quarter: 28–17, 23–23, 20–27, 24–22
Pts: Kentavious Caldwell-Pope 26; Rebs: DeAndre Liggins 7 Asts: Peyton Siva 6	Pts: Chris Crawford 20; Rebs: Tarik Black 7 Asts: Chris Kramer 7

Amway Center, Orlando, Florida
Referees: Kevin Scott, Steven Perry, Aaron Smith

NBA TV

July 5
5:00 pm

Boxscore

Memphis Grizzlies 84, Oklahoma City Thunder 63
Scoring by quarter: 17–19, 33–16, 16–15, 18–13
Pts: Jordan Adams 22; Rebs: Stokes, Franklin 5 each Asts: Scottie Wilbekin 5	Pts: Perry Jones 15; Rebs: Andre Roberson 8 Asts: Jeremy Lamb 2

Amway Center, Orlando, Florida
Referees: Curtis Blair, Gediminas Petraitis, Ged Regetz

==== Day 2 ====
NBA TV

July 6
3:00 pm

Boxscore

Memphis Grizzlies 82, Detroit Pistons 85
Scoring by quarter: 22-20, 17-14, 20-30, 23-21
Pts: Jordan Adams 20; Rebs: Jarnell Stokes 12; Asts: Jamaal Franklin 4	Pts: Kentavious Caldwell-Pope 30; Rebs: Kentavious Caldwell-Pope 12; Asts: Peyton Siva 7

Amway Center, Orlando, Florida
Referees: James Williams, Isaac Barnett, Bharat Ramanan

NBA TV

July 6
5:00 pm

Boxscore

Philadelphia 76ers 84, Oklahoma City Thunder 73
Scoring by quarter: 25-17, 21-13, 21-23, 17-20
Pts: Casper Ware 20; Rebs: Ronald Roberts Jr. 6 Asts: Casper Ware 5	Pts: Mario Little 18; Rebs: André Roberson 10; Asts: Semaj Christon 5

Amway Center, Orlando, Florida
Referees: Steven Anderson, Steven Perry, Jacyn Goble, JB DeRosa

NBA TV

July 6
7:00 pm

Boxscore

Miami Heat 110, Brooklyn Nets 91
Scoring by quarter: 30-17, 21-19, 27-26, 32-29
Pts: James Ennis 29; Rebs: Justin Hamilton 9 Asts: Shabazz Napier 7	Pts: Mason Plumlee 18; Rebs: Thomas, Jefferson 5 each Asts: M. Brown, Thames 6 each

Amway Center, Orlando, Florida
Referees: Curtis Blair, Marques Pettigrew, Ged Regetz

==== Day 3 ====
NBA TV

July 7
3:00 pm

Boxscore

Indiana Pacers 96, Boston Celtics 77
Scoring by quarter: 14–30, 34–11, 31–16, 17–20
Pts: Willie Reed 18; Rebs: Arinze Onuaku 8 Asts: James Nunnally 4	Pts: Kelly Olynyk 15; Rebs: Olynyk, Pressey, Moser 6 each Asts: Olynyk, Smart, Moser 4 each

Amway Center, Orlando, Florida
Referees: Steven Perry, Brent Barnaky, Kelly Pfeifer

NBA TV

July 7
5:00 pm

Boxscore

Houston Rockets 69, Orlando Magic 87
Scoring by quarter: 11–23, 20–31, 18–11, 20–22
Pts: Nick Johnson 13; Rebs: Chris Crawford 8 Asts: Chris Crawford 5	Pts: Elfrid Payton 12; Rebs: Elfrid Payton 8 Asts: Elfrid Payton 9

Amway Center, Orlando, Florida
Referees: Kevin Scott, JB DeRosa, Gediminas Petraitis

NBA TV

July 7
7:00 pm

Boxscore

Oklahoma City Thunder 98, Brooklyn Nets 84
Scoring by quarter: 22–24, 21–19, 26–22, 29–19
Pts: Jeremy Lamb 26; Rebs: Mitch McGary 13; Asts: Michael Stockton 5	Pts: Mason Plumlee 13; Rebs: Summers, Plumlee 6 each Asts: Marquis Teague 4

Amway Center, Orlando, Florida
Referees: Ben Taylor, John Conley, Aaron Smith

==== Day 4 ====
NBA TV

July 8
3:00 pm

Boxscore

Orlando Magic 73, Memphis Grizzlies 80
Scoring by quarter: 23-17, 16-24, 17-23, 17-16
Pts: Dewayne Dedmon 13; Rebs: Victor Oladipo 7 Asts: C. Jones, Payton 3 each	Pts: Kalin Lucas 14; Rebs: Jarnell Stokes 12; Asts: Scottie Wilbekin 5

Amway Center, Orlando, Florida
Referees: James Williams, Marques Pettigrew, Jacyn Goble

NBA TV

July 8
5:00 pm

Boxscore

Miami Heat 78, Detroit Pistons 80
Scoring by quarter: 21-14, 17-16, 17-27, 23-23
Pts: Tyler Honeycutt 12; Rebs: Eli Holman 9 Asts: Napier, Dawkins, Drew 2 each	Pts: Kentavious Caldwell-Pope 26; Rebs: Caldwell-Pope 7 Asts: DeAndre Liggins 5

Amway Center, Orlando, Florida
Referees: Curtis Blair, Ged Regetz, Kelly Pfeifer

NBA TV

July 8
7:00 pm

Boxscore

Houston Rockets 71, Philadelphia 76ers 92
Scoring by quarter: 21-19, 19-27, 19-23, 12-23
Pts: Jahii Carson 18; Rebs: Tarik Black 10; Asts: Nick Johnson 4	Pts: Casper Ware 16; Rebs: JaKarr Sampson 8 Asts: Casper Ware 4

Amway Center, Orlando, Florida
Referees: Steven Anderson, Isaac Barnett, Bharat Ramanan

==== Day 5 ====
NBA TV

July 9
3:00 pm

Boxscore

Indiana Pacers 94, Oklahoma City Thunder 71
Scoring by quarter: 22-23, 34-13, 22-15, 16-20
Pts: Donald Sloan 19; Rebs: Kevin Jones 12; Asts: Donald Sloan 6	Pts: Mitch McGary 15; Rebs: André Roberson 10; Asts: A. Roberson, J. Lamb, N. Smith, M. Stockton 2 each

Amway Center, Orlando, Florida
Referees: Brent Barnaky, Steven Perry, Gediminas Petraitis

NBA TV

July 9
5:00 pm

Boxscore

Philadelphia 76ers 92, Brooklyn Nets 86
Scoring by quarter: 20-16, 16-27, 27-26, 29-17
Pts: Casper Ware 24; Rebs: H. Thompson, Noel 9 each Asts: Casper Ware 8	Pts: Greene, M. Brown 17 each Rebs: Cory Jefferson 8 Asts: Marquis Teague 9

Amway Center, Orlando, Florida
Referees: Curtis Blair, JB DeRosa, Aaron Smith

NBA TV

July 9
7:00 pm

Boxscore

Boston Celtics 92, Detroit Pistons 90
Scoring by quarter: 20-17, 32-33, 22-11, 18-29
Pts: Kelly Olynyk 16; Rebs: Kelly Olynyk 9 Asts: Marcus Smart 6	Pts: Kentavious Caldwell-Pope 26; Rebs: Kentavious Caldwell-Pope 9 Asts: Liggins, Caldwell-Pope 3 each

Amway Center, Orlando, Florida
Referees: Kevin Scott, Steven Anderson, Ged Regetz

==== Day 6 ====
NBA TV

July 10
3:00 pm

Boxscore

Indiana Pacers 84, Miami Heat 74
Scoring by quarter: 16-13, 22-21, 20-23, 26-17
Pts: James Nunnally 19; Rebs: Kevin Jones 15; Asts: Dee Bost 7	Pts: James Ennis 17; Rebs: Justin Hamilton 6 Asts: Napier, Drew 5 each

Amway Center, Orlando, Florida
Referees: Curtis Blair, Aaron Smith, Jacyn Goble, Gediminas Petraitis

NBA TV

July 10
5:00 pm

Boxscore

Boston Celtics 76, Orlando Magic 67
Scoring by quarter: 15-14, 14-18, 20-18, 27-17
Pts: Marcus Smart 19; Rebs: Chris Johnson 6 Asts: Marcus Smart 5	Pts: Seth Curry 15; Rebs: Elfrid Payton 9 Asts: Elfrid Payton 10

Amway Center, Orlando, Florida
Referees: Ben Taylor, Isaac Barnett, Marques Pettigrew

NBA TV

July 10
7:00 pm

Boxscore

Memphis Grizzlies 88, Houston Rockets 74
Scoring by quarter: 26-17, 19-27, 19-14, 24-16
Pts: Jordan Adams 19; Rebs: Stokes, D. Thompson 7 each Asts: Scottie Wilbekin 8	Pts: Nick Johnson 22; Rebs: Nick Johnson 6 Asts: Nick Johnson 6

Amway Center, Orlando, Florida
Referees: James Williams, Kelly Pfeifer, Bharat Ramanan

=== Championship day ===
Each team played one game on the league's final day for either first, third, fifth, seventh or ninth place.

==== Seeding criteria ====
The seeding was determined by a team's total points after the first five days. Eight points were awarded in each game: four points for winning a game and one point for every quarter a team won. In the event of a tied quarter, each team is awarded half a point. This differed from the previous year, when only three points were awarded for winning the game, and there were a maximum of seven total points available in each game. If two or more teams had equal points, then the following tiebreakers applied:

1. Total point differential
2. Least total points allowed
3. Coin flip

Each odd-numbered seed was paired with the team seeded immediately below it. For example, the top two seeds played in the championship game, the third and fourth seeds played in the third-place game, etc.

==== Standings/seedings ====
#	Team	GP	W	L	PTS	Tiebreaker Notes
1	Memphis Grizzlies	4	3	1	23	
2	Philadelphia 76ers	4	3	1	22	
3	Indiana Pacers	4	3	1	21	Point Differential +32
4	Boston Celtics	4	3	1	21	Point Differential 0
5	Detroit Pistons	4	3	1	19	
6	Orlando Magic	4	2	2	16	
7	Miami Heat	4	1	3	13.5	
8	Oklahoma City Thunder	4	1	3	12	
9	Brooklyn Nets	4	1	3	8	
10	Houston Rockets	4	0	4	4.5	

==== Championship day schedule ====
All times are in Eastern Daylight Time (UTC−4)

===== 9th-place game =====
NBA TV on tape delay at 4:00 am on July 12

July 11
4:00 pm

Boxscore

Houston Rockets 101, Brooklyn Nets 75
Scoring by quarter: 29-22, 21-17, 26-18, 25-18
Pts: Jermaine Marshall 21; Rebs: Nick Johnson 10; Asts: Nick Johnson 10	Pts: Cory Jefferson 19; Rebs: Cory Jefferson 7 Asts: Marquis Teague 7

Amway Center, Orlando, Florida
Referees: Steven Anderson, Bharat Ramanan, Kelly Pfeifer

===== 7th-place game =====
NBA TV

July 11
2:00 pm

Boxscore

Oklahoma City Thunder 103, Miami Heat 98
Scoring by quarter: 35-29, 25-29, 20-22, 23-18
Pts: Perry Jones 20; Rebs: Perry Jones 8 Asts: Mario Little 7	Pts: Andre Dawkins 27; Rebs: Justin Hamilton 7 Asts: Shabazz Napier 7

Amway Center, Orlando, Florida
Referees: Ben Taylor, Marques Pettigrew, Jacyn Goble

===== 5th-place game =====
NBA TV

July 11
8:00 am

Boxscore

Orlando Magic 96, Detroit Pistons 87
Scoring by quarter: 23-20, 29-23, 30-19, 14-25
Pts: Victor Oladipo 22; Rebs: Vernon Macklin 6 Asts: Elfrid Payton 8	Pts: DeAndre Liggins 20; Rebs: Justin Harper 8 Asts: DeAndre Liggins 7

Amway Center, Orlando, Florida
Referees: Gediminas Petraitis, JB DeRosa, Ged Regetz

===== 3rd-place game =====
NBA TV

July 11
10:00 am

Boxscore

Boston Celtics 86, Indiana Pacers 95
Scoring by quarter: 22–27, 22–25, 24–19, 18–24
Pts: Marcus Smart 20; Rebs: Moser, Anosike 10 each Asts: Phil Pressey 13	Pts: Donald Sloan 20; Rebs: K. Jones, Onuaku 8 each Asts: Donald Sloan 10

Amway Center, Orlando, Florida
Referees: Brent Barnaky, Isaac Barnett, Steven Perry

===== Championship game =====
NBA TV

July 11
12:00 pm

Boxscore

Philadelphia 76ers 91, Memphis Grizzlies 75
Scoring by quarter: 21-15, 14-27, 26-10, 30-23
Pts: Hollis Thompson 21; Rebs: Ronald Roberts Jr. 11; Asts: Casper Ware 7	Pts: Deon Thompson 15; Rebs: Jarnell Stokes 11; Asts: Jordan Adams 5

Amway Center, Orlando, Florida
Referees: James Williams, Kevin Scott, Aaron Smith

=== Final standings ===
#	Team	GP	W	L	PCT
1	Philadelphia 76ers	5	4	1	.800
2	Memphis Grizzlies	5	3	2	.600
3	Indiana Pacers	5	4	1	.800
4	Boston Celtics	5	3	2	.600
5	Orlando Magic	5	3	2	.600
6	Detroit Pistons	5	3	2	.600
7	Oklahoma City Thunder	5	2	3	.400
8	Miami Heat	5	1	4	.200
9	Houston Rockets	5	1	4	.200
10	Brooklyn Nets	5	1	4	.200

=== Individual statistical leaders ===
Points

Player	Team	PPG
Kentavious Caldwell-Pope	Detroit Pistons	24.0
Casper Ware	Philadelphia 76ers	19.0
Donald Sloan	Indiana Pacers	18.5
Mason Plumlee	Brooklyn Nets	18.0
Kelly Olynyk	Boston Celtics	17.5

Rebounds

Player	Team	RPG
Kevin Jones	Indiana Pacers	10.0
Jarnell Stokes	Memphis Grizzlies	9.4
André Roberson	Oklahoma City Thunder	8.3
Hollis Thompson	Philadelphia 76ers	8.0
Arinze Onuaku	Indiana Pacers	7.5

Assists

Player	Team	APG
Elfrid Payton	Orlando Magic	7.0
Marquis Teague	Brooklyn Nets	5.8
Donald Sloan	Indiana Pacers	5.5
Phil Pressey	Boston Celtics	5.4
Casper Ware	Philadelphia 76ers	5.2

=== Honors ===
Josh Cohen of the Orlando Magic's website ranked the top five most valuable players in the Orlando Pro Summer League:

1. Elfrid Payton, Orlando Magic
2. Kentavious Caldwell-Pope, Detroit Pistons
3. Nerlens Noel, Philadelphia 76ers
4. James Ennis, Miami Heat
5. Mason Plumlee, Brooklyn Nets

== Las Vegas NBA Summer League ==
Pursuant to a sponsorship agreement with Samsung Group (Korean: 삼성그룹), the official name of the league is the Samsung NBA Summer League in 2014. Despite the fact that "Las Vegas" is not in the league's official name, and the games were actually played in Paradise, Nevada which is near but not in the City of Las Vegas, the league is nevertheless commonly referred to as the Las Vegas NBA Summer League or the Las Vegas Summer League. This is the case with links and references on the NBA's website.

=== Teams ===
- Atlanta Hawks
- Charlotte Hornets
- Chicago Bulls
- Cleveland Cavaliers
- Dallas Mavericks
- Denver Nuggets
- Golden State Warriors
- Houston Rockets
- Los Angeles Clippers
- Los Angeles Lakers
- Miami Heat
- Milwaukee Bucks
- Minnesota Timberwolves
- NBA D-League Select
- New Orleans Pelicans
- New York Knicks (Note: Although the team's official name is New York Knickerbockers, it is commonly called New York Knicks.)
- Philadelphia 76ers
- Phoenix Suns
- Portland Trail Blazers
- Sacramento Kings
- San Antonio Spurs
- Toronto Raptors
- Utah Jazz
- Washington Wizards

=== Schedule ===
All times are in Eastern Daylight Time (UTC−4)

==== Day 1 ====
NBA TV

July 11
4:00 pm

Boxscore

New York Knicks 76, Dallas Mavericks 64
Scoring by quarter: 17-16, 17-15, 21-15, 21-18
Pts: Tim Hardaway Jr. 25; Rebs: Cole Aldrich 14; Asts: Shane Larkin 5	Pts: Bernard James 15; Rebs: Bernard James 10; Asts: Gal Mekel 4

Cox Pavilion, Paradise, Nevada
Referees: Matt Boland, Brett Nansel, Jeff Wooten

NBA TV

July 11
6:00 pm

Boxscore

Toronto Raptors 89, Los Angeles Lakers 78
Scoring by quarter: 25-15, 22-18, 14-21, 28-24
Pts: John Shurna 21; Rebs: Hassan Whiteside 11; Asts: Dwight Buycks 5	Pts: Jordan Clarkson 21; Rebs: Trevor Mbakwe 8 Asts: Kendall Marshall 5

Cox Pavilion, Paradise, Nevada
Referees: Lauren Holtkamp, Vladimir Voyard-Tadal, Charles Watson

NBA TV

July 11
8:00 pm

Boxscore

Cleveland Cavaliers 70, Milwaukee Bucks 68
Scoring by quarter: 15-15, 22-24, 11-16, 22-13
Pts: Andrew Wiggins 18; Rebs: Alex Kirk 12; Asts: Matthew Dellavedova 6	Pts: G. Antetokounmpo, Parker 17 each Rebs: Jabari Parker 9 Asts: Giannis Antetokounmpo 2

Cox Pavilion, Paradise, Nevada
Referees: Eli Roe, Mitchell Ervin, JT Orr

NBA TV on tape delay at 9:00 am on July 12

July 11
8:30 pm

Boxscore

Golden State Warriors 70, Charlotte Hornets 58
Scoring by quarter: 21-13, 26-10, 13-20, 10-15
Pts: Nemanja Nedović 17; Rebs: Ognjen Kuzmić 8 Asts: Aaron Craft 4	Pts: Mickey McConnell 19; Rebs: Josh Davis 16; Asts: McConnell, Dyson 2 each

Thomas & Mack Center, Paradise, Nevada
Referees: Tre Maddox, Jason Goldenberg, Phenizee Ransom

NBA TV

July 11
10:00 pm

Boxscore

Sacramento Kings 69, San Antonio Spurs 85
Scoring by quarter: 21-18, 22-17, 11-30, 15-20
Pts: Acy, Stauskas 14 each Rebs: Quincy Acy 7 Asts: Nik Stauskas 3	Pts: Austin Daye 14; Rebs: Austin Daye 9 Asts: Kyle Anderson 6

Cox Pavilion, Paradise, Nevada
Referees: Scott Twardoski, Don Hudson, Justin VanDuyne

NBA TV on tape delay at 6:00 am on July 12

July 11
10:30 pm

Boxscore

NBA D-League Select 81, New Orleans Pelicans 83
Scoring by quarter: 21-10, 22-21, 24-26, 14-26
Pts: Devin Ebanks 15; Rebs: Devin Ebanks 13; Asts: Lockett, Mitchell 3 each	Pts: Russ Smith 20; Rebs: Patric Young 13; Asts: Russ Smith 5

Thomas & Mack Center, Paradise, Nevada
Referees: Dedric Taylor, Sir Allen Conner, Tyler Ford

==== Day 2 ====
NBA TV

July 12
4:00 pm

Boxscore

Portland Trail Blazers 69, New York Knicks 71
Scoring by quarter: 17-14, 15-18, 21-18, 16-21
Pts: Thomas Robinson 17; Rebs: Barton, T. Robinson 7 each Asts: Bobby Brown 5	Pts: Tim Hardaway Jr. 20; Rebs: Henriquez, Larkin 7 each Asts: Cleanthony Early 3

Cox Pavilion, Paradise, Nevada
Referees: Kevin Cutler, Brandon Hiers, Joseph Bissang, Damian Lyons

NBA TV on tape delay at 6:00 am on July 13

July 12
4:30 pm

Boxscore

Atlanta Hawks 74, Washington Wizards 90
Scoring by quarter: 17-23, 24-12, 18-31, 15-24
Pts: Adreian Payne 12; Rebs: Adreian Payne 7 Asts: Schröder, J. Jenkins, Muscala 2 each	Pts: Otto Porter 25; Rebs: Daniel Orton 8 Asts: Maalik Wayns 5

Thomas & Mack Center, Paradise, Nevada
Referees: Illias Koromilas, Karl Lane, Vladimir Voyard-Tadal

NBA TV

July 12
6:00 pm

Boxscore

Toronto Raptors 83, Denver Nuggets 104
Scoring by quarter: 15-32, 23-28, 26-19, 19-25
Pts: Dwight Buycks 21; Rebs: D. Daniels, Nogueira, C. Daniels 5 each Asts: Dwight Buycks 3	Pts: Gary Harris 30; Rebs: Erick Green 7 Asts: Chris Wright 7

Cox Pavilion, Paradise, Nevada
Referees: Nick Buchert, CJ Washington, Yevgenly Mikheyev, Damir Javor

NBA TV on tape delay at 1:30 am on July 13

July 12
6:30 pm

Boxscore

Dallas Mavericks 93, Minnesota Timberwolves 85
Scoring by quarter: 24-25, 27-16, 21-15, 21-29
Pts: B. James, Ledo 21; Rebs: B. James, Carmichael 7 each Asts: Ledo, Bost 3 each	Pts: Shabazz Muhammad 27; Rebs: Shabazz Muhammad 11; Asts: Alexey Shved 3

Thomas & Mack Center, Paradise, Nevada
Referees: Tre Maddox, Phenizee Ransom, Mohammad Alamiri, Leandro Lezcano

NBA TV

July 12
8:00 pm

Boxscore

Phoenix Suns 72, Golden State Warriors 74
Scoring by quarter: 18-18, 11-18, 27-17, 16-21
Pts: T. J. Warren 22; Rebs: Miles Plumlee 9 Asts: Mi. Plumlee, T. Ennis 1	Pts: Justin Holiday 29; Rebs: Justin Holiday 13; Asts: O. Johnson 3

Cox Pavilion, Paradise, Nevada
Referees: Don Hudson, Gediminis Petraitis, Brady Chelette

NBA TV on tape delay at 4:00 am on July 13

July 12
8:30 pm

Boxscore

Chicago Bulls 86, Los Angeles Clippers 70
Scoring by quarter: 22-19, 24-16, 19-16, 21-19
Pts: Tony Snell 27; Rebs: Cameron Bairstow 6 Asts: Doug McDermott 4	Pts: Lorenzo Brown 17; Rebs: Jon Brockman 8 Asts: Lorenzo Brown 8

Thomas & Mack Center, Paradise, Nevada
Referees: Dedric Taylor, Jonathan Sterling, John Butler

NBA TV on tape delay at 8:00 am on July 13

July 12
10:00 pm

Boxscore

Houston Rockets 81, Miami Heat 92
Scoring by quarter: 16-21, 17-23, 22-28, 26-20
Pts: Isaiah Canaan 18; Rebs: Motiejūnas, G. Johnson 4 each Asts: Nick Johnson 6	Pts: Justin Hamilton 21; Rebs: James Ennis 8 Asts: Langston Hall 7

Cox Pavilion, Paradise, Nevada
Referees: Brett Nansel, Ray Acosta, Randy Richardson

NBA TV

July 12
10:30 pm

Boxscore

Utah Jazz 70, Philadelphia 76ers 74
Scoring by quarter: 18-24, 18-15, 16-9, 18-26
Pts: Malcolm Thomas 13; Rebs: Rudy Gobert 9 Asts: Trey Burke 4	Pts: McRae, Kilpatrick 20 each Rebs: Jerami Grant 9 Asts: Frazier, Wilbekin 4 each

Thomas & Mack Center, Paradise, Nevada
Referees: Justin Van Duyne, Charles Watson, Brandon Adair

==== Day 3 ====
NBA TV

July 13
4:00 pm

Boxscore

Cleveland Cavaliers 82, San Antonio Spurs 70
Scoring by quarter: 25–11, 16–12, 18–25, 23–22
Pts: Will Cherry 21; Rebs: Anthony Bennett 14; Asts: Matthew Dellavedova 7	Pts: Deshaun Thomas 21; Rebs: K. Anderson, J. Green 6 each Asts: Darius Morris 5

Cox Pavilion, Paradise, Nevada
Referees: Eli Roe, Jason Goldenberg, Philip Moore

NBA TV on tape delay at 1:30 am on July 14

July 13
4:30 pm

Boxscore

Los Angeles Lakers 73, New Orleans Pelicans 90
Scoring by quarter: 21-29, 15-22, 20-17, 17-22
Pts: Trey Thompkins 18; Rebs: Trey Thompkins 5 Asts: DeAndre Kane 5	Pts: Courtney Fells 25; Rebs: Jeff Withey 7 Asts: Russ Smith 8

Thomas & Mack Center, Paradise, Nevada
Referees: JT Orr, Josue Nieves, Andy Nagy, John Conley

NBA TV

July 13
6:00 pm

Boxscore

Sacramento Kings 72, Charlotte Hornets 65
Scoring by quarter: 16-9, 16-20, 18-17, 22-19
Pts: Ra'Shad James 12; Rebs: Acy, Moreland 9 each Asts: Acy, McCallum 2 each	Pts: P. J. Hairston 22; Rebs: Noah Vonleh 18; Asts: Josh Davis 4

Cox Pavilion, Paradise, Nevada
Referees: Kevin Cutler, Sir Allen Conner, Woody Chappell

NBA TV on tape delay at 4:00 am on July 14

July 13
6:30 pm

Boxscore

Atlanta Hawks 92, NBA D-League Select 94 (2OT)
Scoring by quarter: 24-26, 25-25, 17-15, 22-22, Overtime: 4-4, 0-2
Pts: Dennis Schröder 30; Rebs: Mike Muscala 15; Asts: Dennis Schröder 4	Pts: Tony Mitchell 20; Rebs: T. Mitchell, K. Jones 5 each Asts: Tre Kelley 4

Thomas & Mack Center, Paradise, Nevada
Referees: Karl Lane, Lauren Holtkamp, Rusty Phillips, Jason Baker

NBA TV

July 13
8:00 pm

Boxscore

Chicago Bulls 103, Denver Nuggets 76
Scoring by quarter: 32–24, 20–18, 23–21, 28–13
Pts: Doug McDermott 31; Rebs: Lance Thomas 7 Asts: Billy Baron 6	Pts: Quincy Miller 26; Rebs: Quincy Miller 8 Asts: Quincy Miller 3

Cox Pavilion, Las Vegas, Nevada
Referees: Matt Boland, Ray Acosta, Billy Williams

NBA TV on tape delay at 6:00 am on July 14

July 13
8:30 pm

Boxscore

Portland Trail Blazers 75, Houston Rockets 67
Scoring by quarter: 19-14, 22-19, 13-28, 21-6
Pts: CJ McCollum 19; Rebs: Thomas Robinson 12; Asts: Barton, C. McCollum 3 each	Pts: Nick Johnson 16; Rebs: R. Covington, Motiejūnas 6 each Asts: Motiejūnas, Canaan 2 each

Thomas & Mack Center, Paradise, Nevada
Referees: Mitchell Ervin, Jaston Carter, Nick Heater, Andy O'Brien

NBA TV

July 13
10:00 pm

Boxscore

Milwaukee Bucks 82, Phoenix Suns 93
Scoring by quarter: 22-23, 18-24, 26-11, 16-35
Pts: G. Antetokounmpo, Wolters 16 each Rebs: Jabari Parker 11; Asts: Nate Wolters 4	Pts: Seth Curry 26; Rebs: Miles Plumlee 12; Asts: Dionte Christmas 5

Cox Pavilion, Paradise, Nevada
Referees: Scott Bolnick, Michael Pearson, Charles Rubia

NBA TV on tape delay at 9:00 am on July 14

July 13
10:30 pm

Boxscore

Washington Wizards 67, Minnesota Timberwolves 59
Scoring by quarter: 26-21, 9-14, 22-12, 10-12
Pts: Glen Rice Jr. 22; Rebs: Birch, Rice 6 each Asts: Maalik Wayns 6	Pts: Alexey Shved 16; Rebs: Gorgui Dieng 8 Asts: Shved, LaVine, R. Evans 2 each

Thomas & Mack Center, Paradise, Nevada
Referees: Kerby Sitton, Scott Twardoski, Brandon Hiers

==== Day 4 ====
NBA TV

July 14
4:00 pm

Boxscore

New York Knicks 95, Charlotte Hornets 72
Scoring by quarter: 29-15, 33-16, 19-13, 14-28
Pts: Jeremy Tyler 19; Rebs: Tyler, Moore 8 each Asts: Tyler, Hardaway 3 each	Pts: Zeller, Hairston 18 each Rebs: Noah Vonleh 5 Asts: Vonleh, Hairston, McConnell, Dyson 2 each

Cox Pavilion, Paradise, Nevada
Referees: Matt Boland, Sir Allen Conner, Kip Kissinger

NBA TV on tape delay at 9:00 am on July 15

July 14
4:30 pm

Boxscore

Sacramento Kings 89, NBA D-League Select 75
Scoring by quarter: 16-22, 25-18, 25-19, 23-16
Pts: Ben McLemore 18; Rebs: Eric Moreland 11; Asts: Ray McCallum 12	Pts: Devin Ebanks 22; Rebs: Bryan Davis 7 Asts: R. Howard, Kelley 5 each

Thomas & Mack Center, Paradise, Nevada
Referees: Lauren Holtkamp, Tyler Ford, Philip Moore

NBA TV

July 14
6:00 pm

Boxscore

Toronto Raptors 57, Dallas Mavericks 88
Scoring by quarter: 16-22, 10-25, 13-17, 18-24
Pts: DeAndre Daniels 16; Rebs: Hassan Whiteside 9 Asts: Darington Hobson 3	Pts: Ricky Ledo 18; Rebs: Bernard James 7 Asts: Ricky Ledo 5

Cox Pavilion, Paradise, Nevada
Referees: JT Orr, Jonathan Sterling, Jason Goldenberg

NBA TV on tape delay at 6:00 am on July 15

July 14
6:30 pm

Boxscore

San Antonio Spurs 88, New Orleans Pelicans 86
Scoring by quarter: 22-24, 25-15, 17-22, 24-25
Pts: Darius Morris 19; Rebs: Austin Daye 11; Asts: Austin Daye 5	Pts: DeQuan Jones 20; Rebs: Arinze Onuaku 8 Asts: Russ Smith 10

Thomas & Mack Center, Paradise, Nevada
Referees: Mitchell Ervin, Jaston Carter, Phenizee Ransom

NBA TV

July 14
8:00 pm

Boxscore

Cleveland Cavaliers 86, Philadelphia 76ers 77
Scoring by quarter: 15-11, 33-18, 16-22, 22-26
Pts: Matthew Dellavedova 19; Rebs: Shane Edwards 11; Asts: 6 tied at 1 each	Pts: Jordan McRae 18; Rebs: Nerlens Noel 6 Asts: Scottie Wilbekin 4

Cox Pavilion, Paradise, Nevada
Referees: John Butler, Jeff Wooten, Marat Kogut

NBA TV on tape delay at 4:00 am on July 15

July 14
8:30 pm

Boxscore

Miami Heat 85, Los Angeles Clippers 91
Scoring by quarter: 19-18, 26-29, 23-17, 17-27
Pts: Scott Suggs 14; Rebs: Scott Suggs 5 Asts: Larry Drew 4	Pts: Amath M'Baye 27; Rebs: Brockman, D. West 8 each Asts: Delonte West 5

Thomas & Mack Center, Paradise, Nevada
Referees: Scott Twardoski, CJ Washington, Vladimir Voyard-Tadal

NBA TV

July 14
10:00 pm

Boxscore

Golden State Warriors 88, Los Angeles Lakers 89 (OT)
Scoring by quarter: 17-20, 21-24, 26-26, 20-14, Overtime: 4-5
Pts: Justin Holiday 26; Rebs: Mitchell Watt 9 Asts: Nemanja Nedović 4	Pts: Jordan Clarkson 19; Rebs: Thompkins, Clarkson 7 each Asts: Julius Randle 3

Cox Pavilion, Paradise, Nevada
Referees: Scott Bolnick, Brett Nansel, Michael Pearson

NBA TV on tape delay at 12:00 noon on July 15

July 14
10:30 pm

Boxscore

Utah Jazz 87, Milwaukee Bucks 71
Scoring by quarter: 21-15, 25-22, 23-13, 18-21
Pts: Rodney Hood 29; Rebs: Rudy Gobert 9 Asts: Trey Burke 6	Pts: Giannis Antetokounmpo 15; Rebs: O'Bryant, Wright 6 each Asts: Giannis Antetokounmpo 5

Thomas & Mack Center, Paradise, Nevada
Referees: Nick Buchert, Donald Hudson, Josue Nieves

==== Day 5 ====
NBA TV

July 15
4:00 pm

Boxscore

Portland Trail Blazers 91, Atlanta Hawks 76
Scoring by quarter: 22-15, 26-17, 21-23, 22-21
Pts: CJ McCollum 28; Rebs: Thomas Robinson 7 Asts: Thomas Robinson 5	Pts: Dennis Schröder 16; Rebs: Payne, Muscala 7 each Asts: Dennis Schröder 4

Cox Pavilion, Paradise, Nevada
Referees: Karl Lane, Brett Nansel, Brandon Hiers

NBA TV on tape delay at 4:00 am on July 16

July 15
4:30 pm

Boxscore

Chicago Bulls 107, Minnesota Timberwolves 73
Scoring by quarter: 22-19, 27-24, 32-16, 26-14
Pts: Doug McDermott 20; Rebs: Cameron Bairstow 7 Asts: Doug McDermott 6	Pts: Kyrylo Fesenko 13; Rebs: Kyrylo Fesenko 7 Asts: Markel Starks 5

Thomas & Mack Center, Paradise, Nevada
Referees: Kevin Scott, Tyler Ford, Charles Watson

NBA TV

July 15
6:00 pm

Boxscore

Los Angeles Clippers 60, Houston Rockets 83
Scoring by quarter: 10-19, 13-26, 17-13, 20-25
Pts: Shawn Jones 10; Rebs: Shawn Jones 8 Asts: Armon Johnson 3	Pts: Donatas Motiejūnas 15; Rebs: Donatas Motiejūnas 5 Asts: Isaiah Canaan 5

Cox Pavilion, Paradise, Nevada
Referees: Kevin Cutler, CJ Washington, Charles Rubia

NBA TV on tape delay at 9:00 am on July 16

July 15
6:30 pm

Boxscore

Miami Heat 83, Washington Wizards 85
Scoring by quarter: 14-32, 24-19, 22-17, 23-17
Pts: James Nunnally 22; Rebs: Tyler Honeycutt 12; Asts: Shabazz Napier 4	Pts: Glen Rice Jr. 24; Rebs: Khem Birch 11; Asts: Glen Rice Jr. 4

Thomas & Mack Center, Paradise, Nevada
Referees: Eli Roe, Steven Anderson, Vladimir Voyard-Tadal

NBA TV

July 15
8:00 pm

Boxscore

Philadelphia 76ers 88, Phoenix Suns 97
Scoring by quarter: 19-23, 24-25, 28-26, 17-23
Pts: Jordan McRae 21; Rebs: Jerami Grant 7 Asts: Brandon Davies 3	Pts: T. J. Warren 28; Rebs: Warren, Mi. Plumlee 11 each Asts: Tyler Ennis 5

Cox Pavilion, Paradise, Nevada
Referees: Marat Kogut, Dedric Taylor, Aaron Smith

NBA TV on tape delay at 11:30 pm

July 15
8:30 pm

Boxscore

Utah Jazz 87, Denver Nuggets 69
Scoring by quarter: 21-24, 23-7, 17-13, 26-25
Pts: Erik Murphy 17; Rebs: Malcolm Thomas 10; Asts: M. Thomas, Exum, Burke 3 each	Pts: Gary Harris 18; Rebs: Jerrelle Benimon 11; Asts: Kanacevic, E. Green 2 each

Thomas & Mack Center, Paradise, Nevada
Referees: Ben Taylor, Jeff Wooten, Kip Kissinger

=== Championship ===
The championship was determined by a single-elimination tournament; the top 8 teams received a first-round bye.

==== Seeding criteria ====
Teams were seeded first by overall record, then by a tiebreaker system.

1. Head-to-head result (applicable only to ties between two teams, not to multiple-team ties)
2. Quarter point system (1 point for win, .5 for tie, 0 for loss, 0 for overtime periods)
3. Point differential
4. Coin flip

The head-to-head result was extremely unlikely to apply in determining seeding, since the teams played only three games before being seeded. It is impossible for two teams to both be 3-0 or 0-3 and have played one another. It is also very unlikely that exactly two teams and no others finish either 2-1 or 1-2 and for those two teams to have played one another. Even in the situation where there is a multiple-team tie and some but not all the teams have superior or inferior quarter points, the remaining teams look first to the point differential even if only two teams remain. Unlike tiebreak criteria often found in sports leagues, multiple-team ties that are reduced to two teams by progression through the tiebreaker steps are not returned to the first step of the two-team tiebreaker.

First-round losers played consolation games to determine 17th through 24th places. These teams either keep their own seeding or inherited that of their first-round opponent, if lower. For example, if the #9 seed lost in the first round to the #24 seed, it became the new #24 seed. Based on this, each odd-numbered reseeded team was matched against the next lower reseeded opponent with #17 playing #18, #19 playing #20, #21 playing #22 and #23 playing #24.

Second-round losers played consolation games to determine ninth through 16th places. These teams took the lower seed number of the two teams involved in their second-round games with the built-in assumption that lower-seeded teams that won their first-round games inherited the higher seed from the opponent they defeated. For example, if the #23 seed won its first-round game against the #10 seed, it was treated as the #10 seed in the second round. If the original #23 seed/inherited #10 seed then defeated the #7 seed in the second round, the #7 seed was treated as the #10 seed in the consolation round. Based on this, each odd-numbered reseeded team was matched against the next lower reseeded opponent with #9 playing #10, #11 playing #12, #13 playing #14, and #15 playing #16.

==== Standings/seedings ====
#	Team	GP	W	L	PCT	QP	Tiebreaker Notes
1	Chicago Bulls	3	3	0	1.000	12	
2	New York Knicks	3	3	0	1.000	9	
3	Cleveland Cavaliers	3	3	0	1.000	7.5	
4	Washington Wizards	3	3	0	1.000	6	
5	Utah Jazz	3	2	1	.667	8	Point differential +30
6	Portland Trail Blazers	3	2	1	.667	8	Point differential +21
7	New Orleans Pelicans	3	2	1	.667	8	Point differential +17
8	Sacramento Kings	3	2	1	.667	8	Point differential +5
9	Phoenix Suns	3	2	1	.667	7.5	
10	Dallas Mavericks	3	2	1	.667	6	Point differential +27
11	Golden State Warriors	3	2	1	.667	6	Point differential +13
12	San Antonio Spurs	3	2	1	.667	3	
13	Miami Heat	3	1	2	.333	8	
14	Houston Rockets	3	1	2	.333	5	Point differential +4
15	NBA D-League Select	3	1	2	.333	5	Point differential -14; Won coin flip
16	Philadelphia 76ers	3	1	2	.333	5	Point differential -14; Lost coin flip
17	Los Angeles Lakers	3	1	2	.333	4.5	
18	Denver Nuggets	3	1	2	.333	4	Point differential -24
19	Toronto Raptors	3	1	2	.333	4	Point differential -41
20	Los Angeles Clippers	3	1	2	.333	3	
21	Milwaukee Bucks	3	0	3	.000	4.5	
22	Atlanta Hawks	3	0	3	.000	4	Point differential -33
23	Charlotte Hornets	3	0	3	.000	4	Point differential -42
24	Minnesota Timberwolves	3	0	3	.000	4	Point differential -50

==== Bracket ====
First Round (July 16)
16	Philadelphia 76ers	85
17	Los Angeles Lakers	63
9	Phoenix Suns	77
24	Minnesota Timberwolves	86
12	San Antonio Spurs	100
21	Milwaukee Bucks	71
13	Miami Heat	96
20	Los Angeles Clippers	87
14	Houston Rockets	93
19	Toronto Raptors	77
11	Golden State Warriors	65
22	Atlanta Hawks	68
10	Dallas Mavericks	81
23	Charlotte Hornets	82
15	NBA D-League Select	87
18	Denver Nuggets	75

Second Round (July 17)
1	Chicago Bulls	79
16	Philadelphia 76ers	68
24	Minnesota Timberwolves	86
8	Sacramento Kings	100
5	Utah Jazz	77
12	San Antonio Spurs	86
13	Miami Heat	67
4	Washington Wizards	78
3	Cleveland Cavaliers	90
14	Houston Rockets	96
22	Atlanta Hawks	88
6	Portland Trail Blazers	65
7	New Orleans Pelicans	75
23	Charlotte Hornets	104
15	NBA D-League Select	73
2	New York Knicks	80

Quarterfinals (July 19)
1	Chicago Bulls	61
8	Sacramento Kings	80
12	San Antonio Spurs	94
4	Washington Wizards	95***
14	Houston Rockets	78
22	Atlanta Hawks	71
23	Charlotte Hornets	82
2	New York Knicks	79

Semifinals (July 20)
8	Sacramento Kings	74
4	Washington Wizards	62
14	Houston Rockets	83
23	Charlotte Hornets	79

Final (July 21)
8	Sacramento Kings	77
14	Houston Rockets	68

- * indicates number of overtime periods.

==== Tournament schedule ====
All times are in Eastern Daylight Time (UTC−4)

===== First round =====
NBA TV

July 16
4:00 pm

Boxscore

Minnesota Timberwolves 86, Phoenix Suns 77
Scoring by quarter: 14-19, 23-14, 20-20, 29-24
Pts: Zach LaVine 20; Rebs: Gorgui Dieng 19; Asts: Fesenko, LaVine, G. Robinson 2 each	Pts: T. J. Warren 26; Rebs: Miles Plumlee 12; Asts: Tyler Ennis 5

Cox Pavilion, Paradise, Nevada
Referees: Kevin Scott, Mitchell Ervin, Charles Watson

NBA TV on tape delay at 4:00 am on July 17

July 16
4:30 pm

Boxscore

Charlotte Hornets 82, Dallas Mavericks 81
Scoring by quarter: 19-15, 34-21, 11-19, 18-26
Pts: P. J. Hairston 18; Rebs: Noah Vonleh 10; Asts: Mickey McConnell 3	Pts: Gal Mekel 17; Rebs: Bernard James 7 Asts: Gal Mekel 6

Thomas & Mack Center, Paradise, Nevada
Referees: James Williams, Tre Maddox, Randy Richardson

NBA TV on tape delay at 9:00 am on July 17

July 16
6:00 pm

Boxscore

Atlanta Hawks 68, Golden State Warriors 65
Scoring by quarter: 19-18, 19-16, 22-14, 8-17
Pts: Dennis Schröder 17; Rebs: Adreian Payne 9 Asts: Stephen Holt 3	Pts: Justin Holiday 15; Rebs: Ognjen Kuzmić 10; Asts: Aaron Craft 4

Cox Pavilion, Paradise, Nevada
Referees: Matt Boland, Jason Goldberg, Brandon Hiers

NBA TV

July 16
6:30 pm

Boxscore

Milwaukee Bucks 71, San Antonio Spurs 100
Scoring by quarter: 19-31, 15-23, 20-28, 17-18
Pts: Giannis Antetokounmpo 20; Rebs: Giannis Antetokounmpo 7 Asts: Wolters, Brust 2 each	Pts: Kyle Anderson 14; Rebs: JaMychal Green 6 Asts: Austin Daye 4

Thomas & Mack Center, Paradise, Nevada
Referees: Eli Roe, Phenizee Ransom, Michael Pearson

NBA TV on tape delay at 1:30 am on July 17

July 16
8:00 pm

Boxscore

Los Angeles Clippers 87, Miami Heat 96
Scoring by quarter: 21-20, 20-21, 24-28, 22-27
Pts: Keith Benson 18; Rebs: Shawn Jones 8 Asts: Armon Johnson 5	Pts: Justin Hamilton 18; Rebs: Tyler Honeycutt 15; Asts: Larry Drew 10

Cox Pavilion, Paradise, Nevada
Referees: Nick Buchert, Sir Allen Connor, Jaston Carter

NBA TV

July 16
8:30 pm

Boxscore

Toronto Raptors 77, Houston Rockets 93
Scoring by quarter: 31-17, 25-13, 5-27, 16-36
Pts: Dwight Buycks 24; Rebs: Hassan Whiteside 10; Asts: Dwight Buycks 4	Pts: Motiejūnas, Canaan 18 each Rebs: Robert Covington 9 Asts: Robert Covington 3

Thomas & Mack Center, Paradise, Nevada
Referees: Brent Barnaky, Justin Van Duyne, Josue Nieves

NBA TV on tape delay at 6:00 am on July 17

July 16
10:00 pm

Boxscore

Denver Nuggets 75, NBA D-League Select 87
Scoring by quarter: 14-19, 18-20, 19-17, 24-31
Pts: Erick Green 17; Rebs: Jerrelle Benimon 8 Asts: Gary Harris 4	Pts: Tony Mitchell 26; Rebs: Bell-Holter, B. Davis 8 each Asts: Tre Kelley 5

Cox Pavilion, Paradise, Nevada
Referees: Scott Twardoski, Scott Bolnick, Ray Acosta

NBA TV

July 16
10:30 pm

Boxscore

Los Angeles Lakers 63, Philadelphia 76ers 85
Scoring by quarter: 20-20, 10-32, 26-14, 7-19
Pts: K. Murphy, Randle 12 each Rebs: Randle, Clarkson 6 each Asts: Julius Randle 3	Pts: Kilpatrick, E. Millsap 19 each Rebs: Drew Gordon 10; Asts: Ware, Wilbekin 3 each

Thomas & Mack Center, Paradise, Nevada
Referees: JT Orr, Gediminis Petraitis, Dedric Taylor

===== Second round =====
NBA TV

July 17
4:00 pm

Boxscore

Charlotte Hornets 104, New Orleans Pelicans 75
Scoring by quarter: 34-13, 18-27, 26-19, 26-16
Pts: P. J. Hairston 21; Rebs: Josh Davis 12; Asts: Mickey McConnell 11	Pts: Ru. Smith, Fells 19 each Rebs: Withey, Ru. Smith 5 each Asts: Russ Smith 6

Thomas & Mack Center, Paradise, Nevada
Referees: JT Orr, Scott Bolnick, Don Hudson

NBA TV on tape delay at 9:00 am on July 18

July 17
4:30 pm

Boxscore

Minnesota Timberwolves 86, Sacramento Kings 100
Scoring by quarter: 21-28, 26-27, 22-19, 17-26
Pts: Shabazz Muhammad 24; Rebs: Gorgui Dieng 12; Asts: Zach LaVine 4	Pts: Ben McLemore 22; Rebs: Quincy Acy 7 Asts: Stauskas, McCallum 5 each

Cox Pavilion, Paradise, Nevada
Referees: Matt Boland, Jaston Carter, Brett Nansel

NBA TV

July 17
6:00 pm

Boxscore

San Antonio Spurs 86, Utah Jazz 77
Scoring by quarter: 16-17, 19-19, 18-18, 33-23
Pts: Austin Daye 20; Rebs: JaMychal Green 9 Asts: Ayres, Cotton 3 each	Pts: Rodney Hood 19; Rebs: Brock Motum 8 Asts: Malcolm Thomas 4

Thomas & Mack Center, Paradise, Nevada
Referees: Scott Twardoski, CJ Washington, Kip Kissinger

NBA TV on tape delay at 6:00 am on July 18

July 17
6:30 pm

Boxscore

Atlanta Hawks 88, Portland Trail Blazers 65
Scoring by quarter: 20-13, 18-20, 28-18, 22-14
Pts: Adreian Payne 19; Rebs: Mike Muscala 7 Asts: Schröder, Releford 4 each	Pts: Bobby Brown 20; Rebs: Will Barton 10; Asts: CJ McCollum 3

Cox Pavilion, Paradise, Nevada
Referees: Marat Kogut, Mitchell Ervin, Jonathan Sterling

NBA TV

July 17
8:00 pm

Boxscore

Houston Rockets 96, Cleveland Cavaliers 90
Scoring by quarter: 18-18, 26-25, 29-20, 23-27
Pts: Isaiah Canaan 28; Rebs: Donatas Motiejūnas 11; Asts: Nick Johnson 5	Pts: A. Wiggins, Cherry 21 each Rebs: Carrick Felix 11; Asts: Cherry, Granger 3 each

Thomas & Mack Center, Paradise, Nevada
Referees: Kevin Cutler, Justin Van Duyne, Jeff Wooten

NBA TV on tape delay at 4:00 am on July 18

July 17
8:30 pm

Boxscore

Miami Heat 67, Washington Wizards 78
Scoring by quarter: 11-17, 20-16, 19-16, 17-29
Pts: Justin Hamilton 15; Rebs: Justin Hamilton 9 Asts: Honeycutt, Hamilton, T. Johnson, Barthel 2 each	Pts: Glen Rice Jr. 22; Rebs: Daniel Theis 11; Asts: Kwame Vaughn 4

Cox Pavilion, Paradise, Nevada
Referees: Eddie F. Rush, Steven Anderson, Aaron Smith

NBA TV on tape delay at 1:30 am on July 18

July 17
10:00 pm

Boxscore

Philadelphia 76ers 68, Chicago Bulls 79
Scoring by quarter: 15-23, 26-20, 11-18, 16-18
Pts: Jordan McRae 25; Rebs: Drew Gordon 8 Asts: Noel, E. Millsap 2 each	Pts: Bairstow, Snell 18 each Rebs: Cameron Bairstow 8 Asts: Lazeric Jones 4

Thomas & Mack Center, Paradise, Nevada
Referees: Karl Lane, Ben Taylor, Sir Allen Conner

NBA TV

July 17
10:30 pm

Boxscore

NBA D-League Select 73, New York Knicks 80
Scoring by quarter: 22-13, 14-23, 9-24, 28-20
Pts: Tony Mitchell; Rebs: Trent Lockett 9 Asts: Tre Kelley 6	Pts: Tim Hardaway Jr. 25; Rebs: Cameron Moore 7 Asts: Shane Larkin 5

Cox Pavilion, Paradise, Nevada
Referees: Haywoode Workman, Tyler Ford, Lauren Holtkamp

===== Consolation round =====
NBA TV on tape delay at 1:30 am on July 19

July 18
4:00 pm

Boxscore

Dallas Mavericks 88, Phoenix Suns 62
Scoring by quarter: 16-20, 21-12, 28-11, 23-19
Pts: Eric Griffin 20; Rebs: Dee Bost 7 Asts: Ricky Ledo 9	Pts: Elias Harris 15; Rebs: Dionte Christmas 8 Asts: Dionte Christmas 3

Cox Pavilion, Paradise, Nevada
Referees: Kevin Scott, Marat Kogut, Kip Kissinger

NBA TV

July 18
4:30 pm

Boxscore

Milwaukee Bucks 79, Golden State Warriors 74
Scoring by quarter: 19-13, 26-8, 15-22, 19-31
Pts: Jabari Parker 20; Rebs: Jabari Parker 15; Asts: Parker, Taylor 2 each	Pts: Aaron Craft 10; Rebs: James Michael McAdoo 7 Asts: Nemanja Nedović 4

Thomas & Mack Center, Paradise, Nevada
Referees: James Williams, Tyler Ford, Ray Acosta

NBA TV on tape delay at 4:00 am on July 19

July 18
6:00 pm

Boxscore

Los Angeles Clippers 60, Toronto Raptors 64
Scoring by quarter: 18-12, 9-24, 17-16, 16-12
Pts: Lorenzo Brown 13; Rebs: Jon Brockman 7 Asts: 7 tied at 1 each	Pts: DeAndre Daniels 15; Rebs: DeAndre Daniels 14; Asts: Myck Kabongo 3

Cox Pavilion, Paradise, Nevada
Referees: Brent Barnaky, Josue Nieves, Don Hudson

NBA TV

July 18
6:30 pm

Boxscore

Denver Nuggets 77, Los Angeles Lakers 83
Scoring by quarter: 17-29, 26-14, 11-13, 23-27
Pts: Erick Green 20; Rebs: Jerrelle Benimon 15; Asts: Jerrelle Benimon 4	Pts: K. Murphy, Randle 14 each Rebs: Jerome Jordan 7 Asts: DeAndre Kane 3

Thomas & Mack Center, Paradise, Nevada
Referees: Kevin Cutler, Jason Goldenberg, Gediminas Petraitis

NBA TV on tape delay at 6:00 am on July 19

July 18
8:00 pm

Boxscore

Philadelphia 76ers 87, NBA D-League Select 91 (OT)
Scoring by quarter: 13-18, 25-15, 27-23, 20-29, Overtime: 2-6
Pts: Adonis Thomas 22; Rebs: Jamelle Hagins 13; Asts: Scottie Wilbekin 5	Pts: Devin Ebanks 23; Rebs: Travis Hyman 13; Asts: Tre Kelley 9

Cox Pavilion, Paradise, Nevada
Referees: Haywoode Workman, Steven Anderson, Brandon Hiers

NBA TV

July 18
10:30 pm

Boxscore

Miami Heat 90, Cleveland Cavaliers 95
Scoring by quarter: 15-24, 25-24, 26-20, 24-27
Pts: Tyler Johnson 20; Rebs: Tyler Honeycutt 7 Asts: Larry Drew 5	Pts: Steven Gray 17; Rebs: Dwight Powell 9 Asts: Will Cherry 6

Thomas & Mack Center, Paradise, Nevada
Referees: Nick Buchert, Michael Pearson, Jonathan Sterling

NBA TV

July 18
8:30 pm

Boxscore

Portland Trail Blazers 73, Utah Jazz 75
Scoring by quarter: 11-4, 14-25, 21-26, 27-20
Pts: CJ McCollum 21; Rebs: Allen Crabbe 8 Asts: Bobby Brown 6	Pts: Malcolm Thomas 16; Rebs: Rudy Gobert 15; Asts: M. Thomas, Exum, I. Clark, Motum 3 each

Thomas & Mack Center, Paradise, Nevada
Referees: Eli Roe, Aaron Smith, Jeff Wooten

NBA TV on tape delay at 9:00 am on July 19

July 18
10:00 pm

Boxscore

Minnesota Timberwolves 97, New Orleans Pelicans 78
Scoring by quarter: 22-30, 23-16, 22-17, 30-15
Pts: Zach LaVine 22; Rebs: Gorgui Dieng 9 Asts: D. J. Kennedy 7	Pts: Russ Smith 21; Rebs: Patric Young 12; Asts: Withey, Ru. Smith, Gaddy 3 each

Cox Pavilion, Paradise, Nevada
Referees: Tre Maddox, Ben Taylor, Charles Watson

===== Quarterfinals =====
NBA TV

July 19
4:00 pm

Boxscore

Charlotte Hornets 82, New York Knicks 79
Scoring by quarter: 18-17, 21-20, 23-12, 20-30
Pts: Justin Brownlee 16; Rebs: Noah Vonleh 10; Asts: Mickey McConnell 6	Pts: Tim Hardaway Jr. 27; Rebs: Cleanthony Early 10; Asts: Tyler, Larkin 3 each

Thomas & Mack Center, Paradise, Nevada
Referees: Brent Barnaky, Scott Bolnick, Dedric Taylor

NBA TV

July 19
6:00 pm

Boxscore

Atlanta Hawks 71, Houston Rockets 78
Scoring by quarter: 15-23, 24-20, 20-15, 12-20
Pts: Muscala, Schröder 16 each Rebs: Adreian Payne 9 Asts: Dennis Schröder 4	Pts: Donatas Motiejūnas 19; Rebs: Donatas Motiejūnas 13; Asts: Isaiah Canaan 5

Thomas & Mack Center, Paradise, Nevada
Referees: James Williams, Karl Lane, Justin Van Duyne

NBA TV

July 19
8:00 pm

Boxscore

Sacramento Kings 80, Chicago Bulls 61
Scoring by quarter: 16-11, 26-18, 16-20, 22-12
Pts: McLemore, M. Brooks 11 each Rebs: Eric Moreland 8 Asts: Ray McCallum, Jr. 4	Pts: Tony Snell 20; Rebs: Cameron Bairstow 8 Asts: Lazeric Jones 6

Thomas & Mack Center, Paradise, Nevada
Referees: Eddie F. Rush, Lauren Holtkamp, Scott Twardoski

NBA TV

July 19
10:00 pm

Boxscore

San Antonio Spurs 94, Washington Wizards 95 (3OT)
Scoring by quarter: 21-20, 28-19, 12-24, 20-18, Overtime: 3-3, 6-6, 4-5
Pts: Austin Daye 27; Rebs: Jeff Ayres 14; Asts: Bryce Cotton 6	Pts: Glen Rice Jr. 36; Rebs: Glen Rice Jr. 11; Asts: Porter, Rice, Burton, Vaughn 3 each

Thomas & Mack Center, Paradise, Nevada
Referees: Eli Roe, Nick Buchert, Gediminis Petraitis

===== Semifinals =====
NBA TV

July 20
6:00 pm

Boxscore

Charlotte Hornets 79, Houston Rockets 83
Scoring by quarter: 17-17, 23-24, 22-27, 17-15
Pts: P. J. Hairston 27; Rebs: Noah Vonleh 16; Asts: Mickey McConnell 4	Pts: Isaiah Canaan 24; Rebs: Donatas Motiejūnas 13; Asts: Geron Johnson 4

Thomas & Mack Center, Paradise, Nevada
Referees: Haywoode Workman, Justin Van Duyne, Lauren Holtkamp

NBA TV

July 20
8:00 pm

Boxscore

Sacramento Kings 74, Washington Wizards 62
Scoring by quarter: 18-11, 27-13, 13-24, 16-14
Pts: MarShon Brooks 14; Rebs: Eric Moreland 12; Asts: Ray McCallum, Jr. 3	Pts: Glen Rice Jr. 24; Rebs: Glen Rice Jr. 9 Asts: Kwame Vaughn 4

Thomas & Mack Center, Paradise, Nevada
Referees: Tre Maddox, Dedric Taylor, JT Orr

===== Championship game =====
NBA TV

July 21
9:00 pm

Boxscore

Houston Rockets 68, Sacramento Kings 77
Scoring by quarter: 17-16, 17-20, 18-14, 16-27
Pts: Nick Johnson 17; Rebs: Tarik Black 10; Asts: Isaiah Canaan 6	Pts: Ray McCallum 29; Rebs: Eric Moreland 10; Asts: Ra'Shad James 2

Thomas & Mack Center, Paradise, Nevada
Referees: Eddie F. Rush, Haywoode Workman, Nick Buchert

=== Final standings ===
#	Team	GP	W	L	PCT	QP	Explanation
1	Sacramento Kings	7	6	1	.857	19	Won Championship Game
2	Houston Rockets	8	5	3	.625	16	Lost Championship Game
3	Washington Wizards	6	5	1	.833	10	Lost in Semifinals
4	Charlotte Hornets	7	3	4	.429	13.5	Lost in Semifinals
5	Chicago Bulls	5	4	1	.800	16	Lost in Quarterfinals
6	New York Knicks	5	4	1	.800	12	Lost in Quarterfinals
7	San Antonio Spurs	6	4	2	.667	12	Lost in Quarterfinals
8	Atlanta Hawks	6	2	4	.333	12	Lost in Quarterfinals
9	Cleveland Cavaliers	5	4	1	.800	11	Lost in Second Round
10	Utah Jazz	5	3	2	.600	12	Lost in Second Round
11	NBA D-League Select	6	3	3	.500	12	Lost in Second Round
12	Portland Trail Blazers	5	2	3	.400	11	Lost in Second Round
13	New Orleans Pelicans	5	2	3	.400	10	Lost in Second Round
14	Miami Heat	6	2	4	.333	15	Lost in Second Round
15	Philadelphia 76ers	6	2	4	.333	10.5	Lost in Second Round
16	Minnesota Timberwolves	6	2	4	.333	10.5	Lost in Second Round
17	Dallas Mavericks	5	3	2	.600	11	Lost in First Round
18	Phoenix Suns	5	2	3	.400	10	Lost in First Round
19	Golden State Warriors	5	2	3	.400	9	Lost in First Round
20	Los Angeles Lakers	5	2	3	.400	9	Lost in First Round
21	Toronto Raptors	5	2	3	.400	7	Lost in First Round
22	Los Angeles Clippers	5	1	4	.200	7	Lost in First Round
23	Milwaukee Bucks	5	1	4	.200	6.5	Lost in First Round
24	Denver Nuggets	5	1	4	.200	6	Lost in First Round

=== Individual statistical leaders ===
Points

Player	Team	PPG
Glen Rice Jr.	Washington Wizards	25.0
Tim Hardaway Jr.	New York Knicks	22.8
Jordan McRae	Philadelphia 76ers	21.0
CJ McCollum	Portland Trail Blazers	20.2
Tony Snell	Chicago Bulls	20.0

Rebounds

Player	Team	RPG
Cole Aldrich	New York Knicks	15.0
Jerrelle Benimon	Denver Nuggets	11.3
Miles Plumlee	Phoenix Suns	11.0
Gorgui Dieng	Minnesota Timberwolves	10.2
Josh Davis	Charlotte Hornets	10.1

Assists

Player	Team	APG
Russ Smith	New Orleans Pelicans	6.4
Tre Kelley	NBA D-League Select	5.2
Matthew Dellavedova	Cleveland Cavaliers	4.7
Maalik Wayns	Washington Wizards	4.7
Lazeric Jones	Chicago Bulls	4.6

=== Honors ===
The All-Summer League First and Second Teams were selected by a panel of media members in attendance at the Las Vegas NBA Summer League.

All-NBA Summer League First Team:

- Doug McDermott, Chicago Bulls
- Donatas Motiejūnas, Houston Rockets
- Otto Porter, Washington Wizards
- Glen Rice Jr., Washington Wizards (MVP)
- Tony Snell, Chicago Bulls

All-NBA Summer League Second Team:

- Rudy Gobert, Utah Jazz
- Tim Hardaway Jr., New York Knicks
- Jordan McRae, Philadelphia 76ers
- Russ Smith, New Orleans Pelicans
- T. J. Warren, Phoenix Suns

Championship Game MVP: Ray McCallum, Sacramento Kings
