= Tyren =

Tyren is a given name. Notable people with the given name include:

- Tyren Arendse (born 1980), South African association football player
- Tyren Johnson (born 1988), American basketball player
- Tyren Montgomery (born 2001), American football player
