= Treas =

Treas may refer to:

== People ==
- Judith Treas (born c. 1947), American sociologist and professor
- Terri Treas, American actress

== Place ==
- Treas, Cambodia

== See also ==
- Trea, a given name
