= Tre (given name) =

Tre is a given name.

== Notable people with the name include ==
=== A ===
- Tré Armstrong (born 1978), Canadian actress
- Tre Arrow (born 1974), American environmental activist
- Tre Avery (born 1997), American football player

=== B ===
- Tre Boston (born 1992), American football player
- Tre Brown (born 1997), American football player
- Tre Bussey (born 1991), American basketball player

=== C ===
- Tre Borràs Cabacés (born 1958), Spanish psychiatrist
- Tre Capital (born 1995), American recording artist
- Tré Cool (born 1972), American musician

=== D ===
- Tre Demps (born 1993), American basketball player
- Tre Donaldson (born 2003), American basketball player

=== F ===
- Tre Flowers (born 1995), American football player
- Tre Ford (born 1998), Canadian football player

=== H ===
- Tre Harbison (born 1998), American football player
- Tre Hargett (born 1969), American politician
- Tre Harris (born 2002), American football player
- Tre Hawkins (born 2000), American football player
- Tre Herndon (born 1996), American football player

=== J ===
- Tre' Jackson (born 1992), American football player
- Tre Jean-Marie (born 1993), British songwriter
- Tre' Johnson (born 1971), American football player
- Tre Johnson (basketball) (born 2006), American basketball player
- Tre Jones (born 2000), American basketball player

=== K ===
- Tre Kelley (born 1985), American basketball player
- Tre King, American football player

=== L ===
- Tre Lamar (born 1997), American football player
- Tre Lamb (born 1989), American football coach and player

=== M ===
- Tre Madden (born 1993), American football player
- Tre Manchester (born 1992), American writer
- Tre Manders (born 1995), Bermudian cricketer
- Tre Mann (born 2001), American basketball player
- Tre Mason (born 1993), American football player
- Tre McBride (born 1992), American football player
- Tre' McKitty (born 1999), American football player
- Tre McLean (born 1993), American basketball player
- Tre Ming (born 1993), Bermudian footballer
- Tre Mission, Canadian musician
- Tre Mitchell (born 2000), American football player
- Tre Mosley (born 2001), American football player

=== N ===
- Tre Nagella, American recording engineer
- Tre' Newton (born 1989), American football player
- Tre Nixon (born 1998), American football player
- Tre Norwood (born 1999), American football player

=== O ===
- Tre Odoms-Dukes (born 1997), American football player

=== R ===
- Tre Richardson (born 2004), American football player
- Tre Roberson (born 1992), American football player

=== S ===
- Tre Simmons (born 1982), American basketball player
- Tre Smith (disambiguation), multiple people
- Tre' Stallings (born 1983), American football player
- Tre Sullivan (born 1994), American football player
- Tre Swilling (born 1999), American football player

=== T ===
- Tre Thomas (born 1975), American football player
- Tre Tomlinson (born 2001), American football player
- Tre Tucker (born 2001), American football player
- Tré Turner (born 2000), American football player

=== V ===
- Tre Van Die Kasie (born 1981), Namibian musician and rapper

=== W ===
- Tre Watson (born 2002), American football player
- Tre Whyte (born 1993), British cyclist
- Tre Williams (born 1971), American singer

== See also ==
- Trae, people with the given name "Trae"
- Trey (given name), people with the given name "Trey"
