= TRE =

TRE or Tre may refer to:

== Arts and entertainment ==
=== Music ===
- 3 (Tre), a 2003 album by Alex Britti
- ¡Tré!, a 2012 album by Green Day
- Tre, a 1983 album by Teresa De Sio

=== Other arts and entertainment ===
- Tre Styles, in the movie Boyz n the Hood
- Tre (film), a 1996 Italian film by Christian De Sica

== People ==
- Tre (given name), people with the given name "Tre"

== Biology and medicine ==
- Tetracycline response element in tetracycline-controlled transcriptional activation
- Tre recombinase, an HIV treatment
- Time Restricted Eating, a type of Intermittent fasting

== Places ==
- Tre- (place name element), common in Cornwall
- Tré, Benin, Collines, Benin
- Tampere (abbreviated TRE), a city in Pirkanmaa, Finland

== Transportation ==
- Tiree Airport, IATA airport code TRE
- Trenton Transit Center, Amtrak station code TRE
- Trinity Railway Express, Dallas Fort Worth Metroplex, US
- Nikola Tre, a proposed electric semi-truck tractor unit

== Other uses ==
- Telecommunications Research Establishment, UK
- TRE (computing), a regular expression engine
- Tre (instrument), a Cambodian trumpet
- Tempore Regis Eduardi (English: in the time of Edward the Confessor), a phrase (abbreviated TRE) used for someone whose exact lifespan is unknown, especially in the Domesday Book
- Texas Reliability Entity, an electricity regulator
- Theologische Realenzyklopädie, a German encyclopedia of theology
- Tribunal Regional Eleitoral, an appellate court in Brazil
- Tension and Trauma Releasing Exercises (TRE), a body-based stress reduction method

== See also ==
- Trey (disambiguation)
- Three (disambiguation)
