= Alexander Myres =

American football player (born 1996)

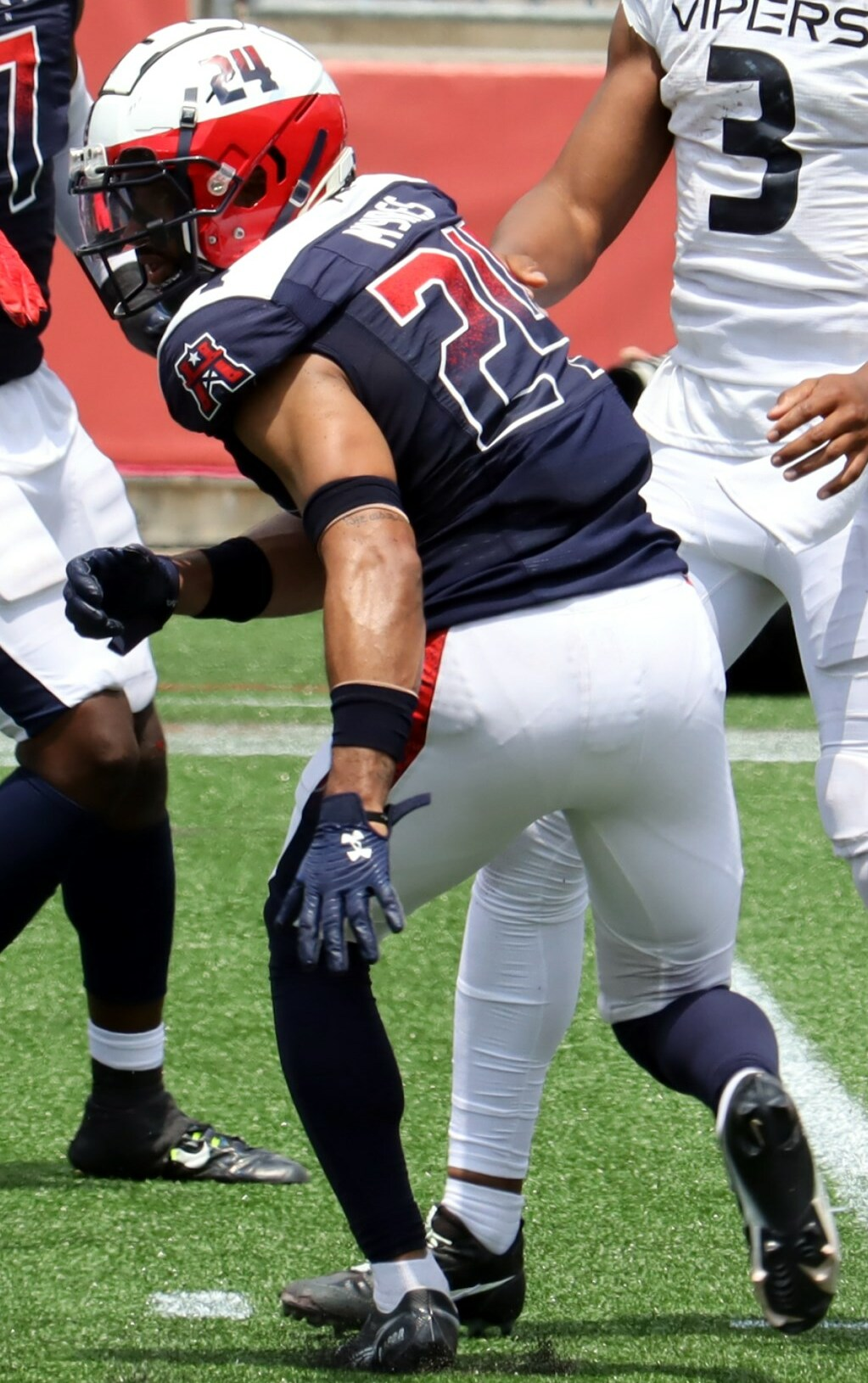
- Myres with the Houston Roughnecks in 2023

No. 24
- Position: Cornerback

Personal information
- Born: April 20, 1996 (age 30); Conroe, Texas, U.S.
- Listed height: 5 ft 11 in (1.80 m)
- Listed weight: 192 lb (87 kg)

Career information
- High school: College Park (The Woodlands, Texas)
- College: Ouachita Baptist / Houston
- NFL draft: 2019: undrafted

Career history
- Pittsburgh Steelers (2019–2020)*; Detroit Lions (2020); San Francisco 49ers (2021)*; Indianapolis Colts (2022)*; Houston Roughnecks (2023)
- * Offseason or practice squad member only

Career NFL statistics
- Total tackles: 5
- Pass deflections: 1
- Stats at Pro Football Reference

Alexander Myres (born April 20, 1996) is an American former professional football player who was a cornerback in the National Football League (NFL). He played college football for Division II program Ouachita Baptist Tigers before transferring to the Houston Cougars of the NCAA Division I Football Bowl Subdivision (FBS).

He was signed by the Pittsburgh Steelers as an undrafted free agent in 2019, seeing no game action during his rookie year. He was then signed by the Detroit Lions, with whom he played in his only NFL game in 2020. He then spent the next two offseasons with the San Francisco 49ers and the Indianapolis Colts, respectively.

In 2023, he played for the Houston Roughnecks of the XFL.

== Early life ==
Myres attended College Park High School in The Woodlands, Texas. As a three-year letterer, Myers made 109 total tackles, 3 forced fumbles, 2 interceptions, and a defensive touchdown made after forcing a fumble on a punt return. He earned All-District First-team and All-County Second-team selection titles as a junior and senior on a state-ranked defense, and he was also selected to participate in the All-Star Bayou Bowl. Outside of football, Myres also lettered in basketball and track. He currently holds his school's all-time record in the 100M dash and advanced to Texas 6A quarterfinals as a senior.

Despite his performance, Alex Myres was lightly recruited out of high school. According to 247sports and Rivals.com, Myres was listed as a zero-star recruit, and he was the only starting defensive back on his team to not receive a D1 scholarship. Myres's only D1 offers came as preferred walk-on's from Towson University and UTEP, but both were too expensive and he instead accepted a full-ride to Ouachita Baptist, a Division 2 program.

== College career ==
During his true freshman season at Ouachita Baptist, Myres made only one start at cornerback but appeared in all games on special teams, making 15 tackles. However, he broke out with a stellar sophomore season, making 79 tackles, 7 sacks, 2 forced fumbles, and 1 interception returned for 57 yards. He had the 10th most tackles among all Division 2 defensive backs from the 2015 season, broke all-time school records, and was named a 2015 D2 All-American. He then transferred to University of Houston.

After redshirting his first year at UH due to NCAA transfer rules, Myres finished his junior season with 47 tackles, 1 recovered fumble for a touchdown, and 1 interception for 13 yards on 9 starts and 11 game appearances. He was awarded player of the game in the Hawaii Bowl against Fresno State when he scooped up a blocked field goal and returned it for a 97-yard touchdown. As a senior, he started in all games and made 65 tackles and 2 interceptions. Entering the NFL draft, Myers had completed his career at Houston with 112 tackles, and his total career with over 200 tackles.

== Professional career ==
Pre-draft measurables
| Height | Weight | Arm length | Hand span | Wingspan | 40-yard dash | 10-yard split | 20-yard split | 20-yard shuttle | Three-cone drill | Vertical jump | Broad jump | Bench press |
|---|---|---|---|---|---|---|---|---|---|---|---|---|
| 5 ft 11 in (1.80 m) | 192 lb (87 kg) | 30 1/8 in (0.77 m) | 9 1/2 in (0.24 m) | 6 ft 0 5/8 in (1.84 m) | 4.53 s | 1.56 s | 2.62 s | 4.18 s | 7.07 s | 36.5 in (0.93 m) | 10 ft 10 in (3.30 m) | 14 reps |
All values from Houston's Pro Day

Myres was not heavily scouted out of college, many of which cited factors included his small physical size and the focus on other fellow Houston Cougars defensive players Ed Oliver, Isaiah Johnson, and Emeke Egbule.

=== Pittsburgh Steelers ===
After going undrafted in the 2019 NFL draft, Myres was signed by the Steelers as an undrafted free agent for training camp on April 27, 2019. On July 31, 2019, he was cut following a non-injury related illness. On September 3, 2019, Myres was resigned to the Steelers' practice squad. Myres signed a futures contract with the team on December 31, 2019, and was subsequently signed to the active roster on February 5, 2020 with appearances on all upcoming Steelers special teams formations.

On August 25, 2020, Myres was placed on injury reserve after tearing his groin muscle at practice. August 30, 2020, Myres was waived by the Steelers to make room on the depth chart.

=== Detroit Lions ===
On December 2, 2020, Myres was signed to the Detroit Lions' practice squad. He was elevated to the active roster on December 19 for the team's week 15 game against the Tennessee Titans, and reverted to the practice squad after the game. Myres was notably recognized for being stiff-armed by Derrick Henry during his lone Lions appearance. He was placed on the practice squad/injured list on December 29 after agitating his previous groin muscle tear at practice.

=== San Francisco 49ers ===
On August 10, 2021, Myres signed a one-year contract with the San Francisco 49ers. He was waived on August 31, 2021.

=== Indianapolis Colts ===
On January 12, 2022, Myres signed a reserve/future contract with the Indianapolis Colts. He was released on August 16, 2022.

=== Houston Roughnecks ===
On November 20, 2022, Myres was selected by the Houston Roughnecks in the 5th round of the XFL draft. He was placed on the reserve list by the team on March 7, 2023, and activated on April 8. He was released on June 22, 2023.
