= The Woodlands College Park High School =

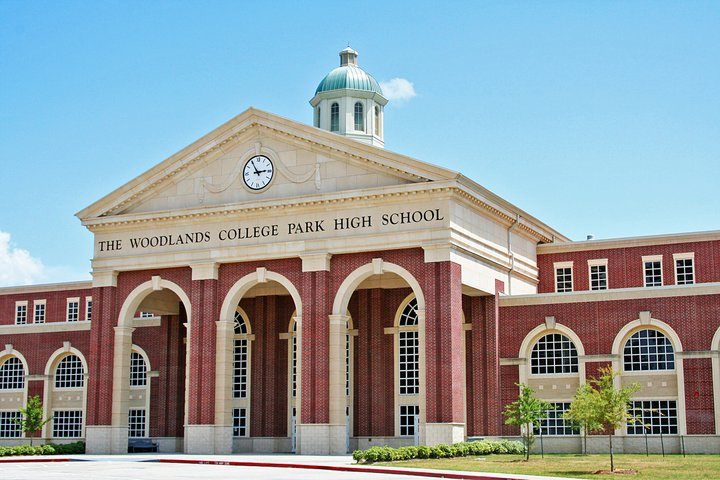

Location
- 3701 College Park Drive; The Woodlands, Texas 77384-6028; United States
- 30.20456679999999°N 95.47175870000001°W

Information
- School type: Public high school
- Motto: Commitment, Pride, Honor, Success!
- Established: 2005
- School district: Conroe Independent School District
- Principal: Robert MacFarlane
- Faculty: 188.92 (on an FTE basis)
- Grades: 9–12
- Enrollment: 3,243 (2021–22)
- Student to teacher ratio: 17.17
- Campus: City: Small
- Colors: Navy, silver and green
- Athletics conference: UIL Class AAAAAA
- Mascot: Cavalier (Calvin)
- Rival: The Woodlands High School
- Website: twcp.conroeisd.net

The Woodlands College Park High School is a high school in The Woodlands, CDP area of Montgomery County, Texas, in the United States. It is operated by the Conroe Independent School District (CISD), and is one of the six main high schools in the district.

Opened in the fall of 2005, it enrolls students from grades 9 to 12. The school operates on a seven-period day and, in some cases, offers zero-and-eighth-hour periods before and after school, respectively. College Park is also home to the Conroe ISD Academy of Science and Technology, a science- and technology-based magnet program.

In addition to sections of The Woodlands, it serves portions of Shenandoah.

== History ==
The school opened in August 2005, and had a cost of $80 million. The Academy of Science and Technology, previously housed at Oak Ridge High School, moved to College Park when College Park opened, since Oak Ridge needed more space for its zoned students. College Park had grades 9 through 11 in its first year, with grade 12 being established the following year. As the school opened, prospective incoming students were given the choice of remaining at The Woodlands High School or going to College Park.

== Campus ==
The three-story school building has 350,000 square feet (33,000 m^{2}) of space. There is a main entrance with four pillars and a clock tower on top and separate gymnasium and auditorium entrances. Carissa D. Mire of the Houston Chronicle stated that the clock tower is similar to the one in Back to the Future.

== Academics ==
For each school year, the Texas Education Agency rates school performance using an A–F grading system based on statistical data. For 2018–2019, the school received a score of 92 out of 100, resulting in an A grade. The school received a similar score of 90 the previous year.

== Athletics ==
College Park's mascot is the Cavalier. College Park Cavaliers compete in football, baseball, basketball (boys and girls), track (boys and girls), cross county (boys and girls), soccer (boys and girls), wrestling (boys and girls), softball, tennis (boys and girls), golf (boys and girls), volleyball, and bowling. The school once had a hockey team, but they disbanded it in 2010.

The Cavaliers bowling team won state in 2013.

The school's hockey team used a rink at Bear Branch Park from 2008 to 2010.

== Demographics ==
In the 2021–2022 school year, TWCP had 3,243 students. The ethnic distribution of students was as follows:

- 49.8% were White
- 28.1% were Hispanic
- 9.0% were Asian
- 8.3% were Black
- 4.3% were Two or More Races
- 0.4% were American Indian
- 0.1% were Pacific Islander

23.1% of students were eligible for free or reduced-price lunch.

== Feeder patterns ==
Elementary schools (K-4) that feed into the Woodlands College Park High School include David Elementary, Hailey Elementary, Lamar Elementary, Houser Elementary (Zone 58 Only), Buckalew Elementary (apartments on FM 1488 only), Sally K Ride Elementary, and Powell Elementary (Harper's Landing and Alden Woods only)).

Intermediate schools (5-6) include Collins Intermediate and Wilkerson Intermediate (excluding the Glen Loch ES zoning area).

All Knox Junior High School students feed into College Park. The Academy of Science and Technology brings in students from The Woodlands High School, Oak Ridge High School and College Park feeder zones.

== Notable alumni ==
- Trey Diller — former NFL player, class of 2007
- Quentin Grimes — NBA player, class of 2018
- Alexander Myres — NFL player, class of 2014
- Austin Pruitt — MLB player, class of 2008
- Parker McCollum — Americana and country singer and songwriter, class of 2011
- Nathaniel Lammons — ATP tennis professional, career high ranking of No. 17 in doubles, class of 2011
- Tyren Montgomery — NFL player, class of 2019
