= Troy Smith (disambiguation) =

Troy Smith (born 1984) is an American football quarterback.

Troy Smith may also refer to:

- Troy Smith (wide receiver), American football wide receiver
- Troy Smith (footballer), Jamaican international footballer
- Troy Smith (businessman), American entrepreneur
- Troy Smith (politician), member of the Mississippi House of Representatives

== See also ==
- Trey Smith (disambiguation)
