= Tray (disambiguation) =

A tray is a shallow platform used to carry items.

Tray may also refer to:

- Tray (given name)
- Jim Tray (1860–1905), American Major League Baseball player
- Tray Mountain, Georgia, United States
- Tray, a user interface feature similar to a taskbar developed for Microsoft's cancelled Cairo project

== See also ==
- Trey (disambiguation)
