= Mount Homard =

Mountain in Antarctica

Mount Homard (80°40′S 29°50′W) is a mountain 1,200 metres (3,900 ft) high, near the head of Blaiklock Glacier, 2 nautical miles (4 km) south of the Trey Peaks in the western part of the Shackleton Range, Antarctica. It was first mapped in 1957 by the Commonwealth Trans-Antarctic Expedition and was named for Sergeant Major Desmond E.L. Homard, an engineer with the advance and transpolar parties of the expedition, 1955–58.
