= Trey Peaks =

Mountains in Antarctica

Coordinates: 80°36′S 28°52′W

Trey Peaks is a set of three conspicuous Antarctic rock peaks, the highest 1,180 metres. They stand west of Blaiklock Glacier and 2 nautical miles (3.7 km) north of Mount Homard in the west part of Shackleton Range. They were first mapped in 1957 by the Commonwealth Trans-Antarctic Expedition and given this descriptive name - trey being a term for three used in dice or cards.
