= Josh Davis (basketball, born 1991) =

American basketball player

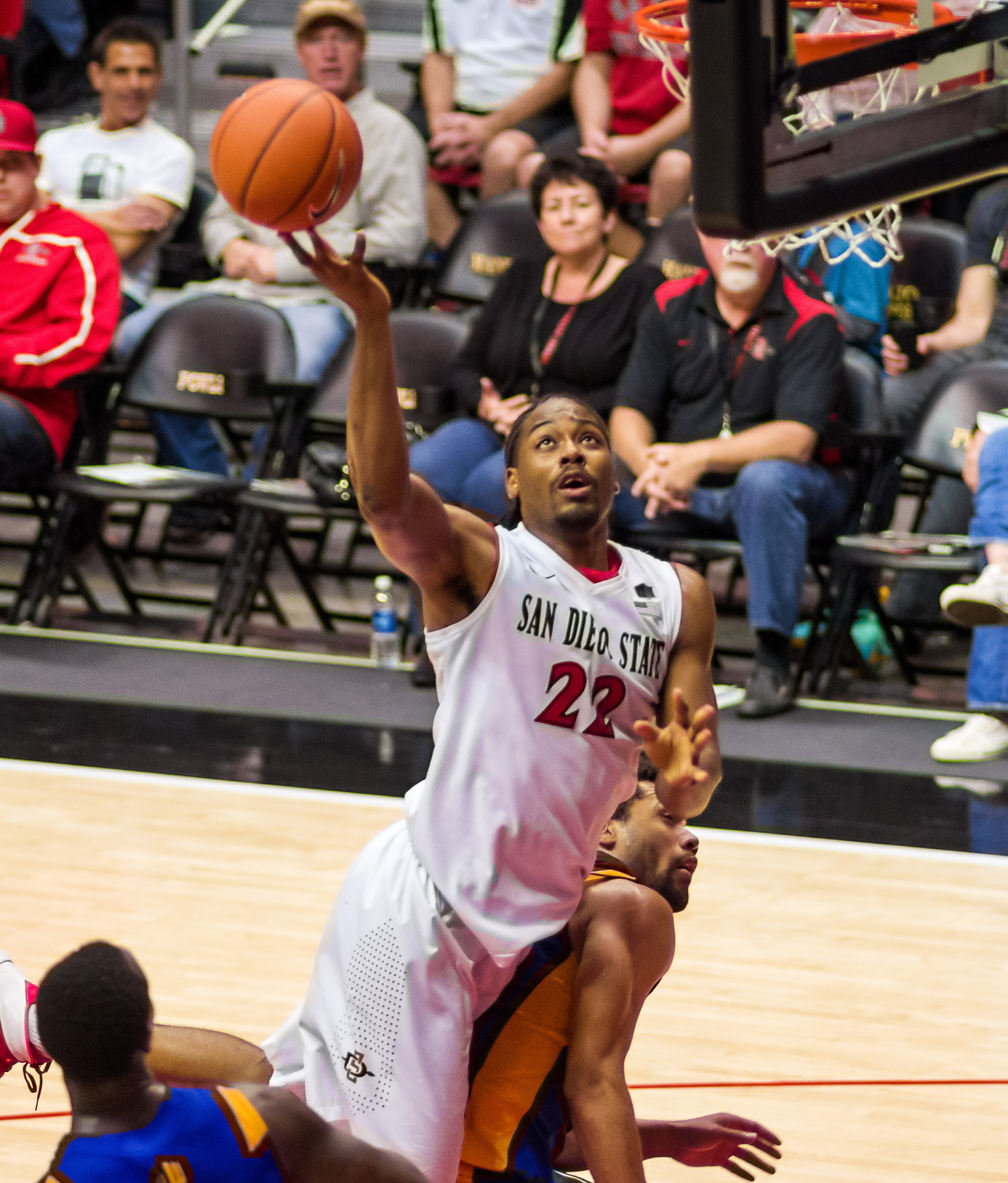

Personal information
- Born: January 22, 1991 (age 35) Raleigh, North Carolina, U.S.
- Listed height: 6 ft 8 in (2.03 m)
- Listed weight: 214 lb (97 kg)

Career information
- High school: Athens Drive (Raleigh, North Carolina)
- College: NC State (2009–2010); Tulane (2011–2013); San Diego State (2013–2014)
- NBA draft: 2014: undrafted
- Playing career: 2014–2019
- Position: Power forward

Career history
- 2014–2015: Austin Spurs
- 2015–2016: Meralco Bolts
- 2015–2017: Shimane Susanoo Magic
- 2017–2018: Toshiba Kawasaki Brave Thunders
- 2018–2019: Cyberdyne Ibaraki Robots

Career highlights
- bj League Best Five (2016)
- Stats at Basketball Reference

Josh Davis (born January 22, 1991) is an American former professional basketball player who last played for Cyberdyne Ibaraki Robots in Japan.

Davis played his freshman year at NC State. Davis transferred to Tulane, where he averaged 17.6 points and 10.7 rebounds per game as a junior and was named to the First Team All-Conference USA. After the season he transferred again to San Diego State but did not have to sit out the season. He was nicknamed Kawhi 2.0 due to his resemblance of Kawhi Leonard and rebounding ability. In his only season at San Diego State, Davis averaged 10.1 rebounds and 7.7 points per game. After the season he signed with the San Antonio Spurs but never played for the team.
