= Trey Mitchell =

Trey Mitchell may refer to:

- Trey Mitchell (strongman) (born 1993), an American strongman
- Trey Mitchell (soccer) (born 1991), an American soccer player
- Trey Mitchell (General Hospital character), a character on the soap opera General Hospital

== See also ==
- Tre Mitchell (born 2000), an American basketball player
