= Tray (given name) =

Tray is a given name. Notable people with the name include:

- Tray Blackmon (born 1985), American football player
- Tray Chaney, American actor
- Tray Grinter (1885–1996, English cricketer
- Tray Walker (1992–2016), American football player

== See also ==
- Trae, given name
- Trey (given name)
