= Tyren Montgomery =

American football player (born 2001)

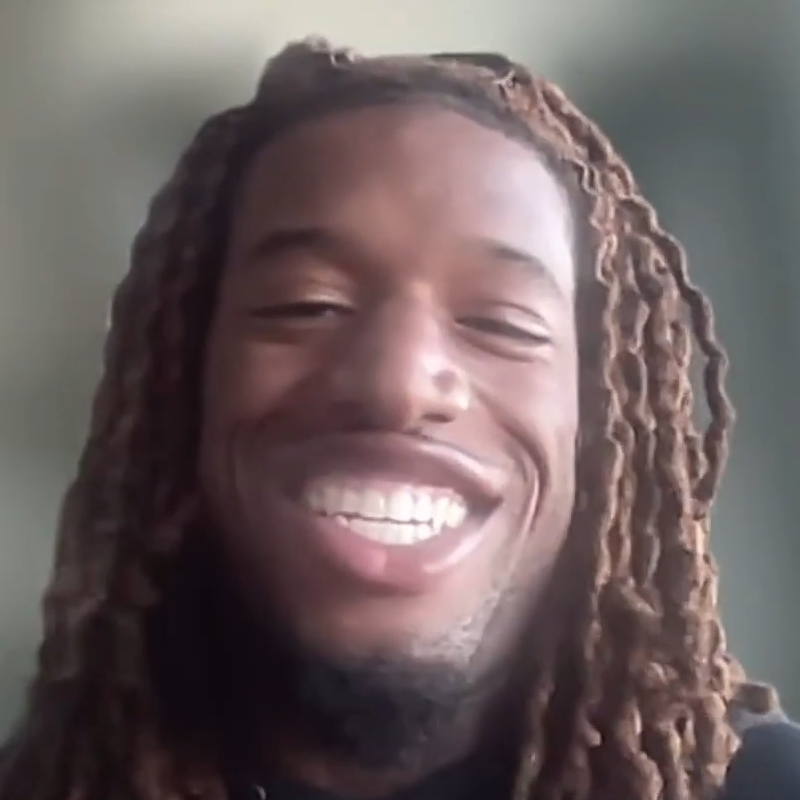
- Montgomery in 2026

No. 19 – Tennessee Titans
- Position: Wide receiver
- Roster status: Practice squad

Personal information
- Born: July 3, 2001 (age 25); Columbus, Ohio, US
- Listed height: 5 ft 11 in (1.80 m)
- Listed weight: 204 lb (93 kg)

Career information
- High school: The Woodlands College Park (The Woodlands, Texas)
- College: Nicholls (2022–2023); John Carroll (2024–2025)
- NFL draft: 2026: undrafted

Career history
- Tennessee Titans (2026–present)*
- * Offseason or practice squad member only

Awards and highlights
- First-team D-III All-American (2025); OAC Wide Receiver of the Year (2024); First-team All-OAC (2024)
- Stats at Pro Football Reference

Tyren Montgomery (born July 3, 2001) is an American professional football wide receiver for the Tennessee Titans of the National Football League (NFL). He played college football for the Nicholls Colonels and John Carroll Blue Streaks and he was signed as an undrafted free agent by the Titans in 2026.

== Early life ==
Montgomery was born on July 13, 2001 in Columbus, Ohio and grew up in The Woodlands, Texas. He attended The Woodlands College Park High School where he was a top basketball player, but did not play football. Montgomery captained his basketball team as a senior. He graduated from The Woodlands in 2019 and afterwards walked-on to play college basketball for the LSU Tigers.

== College career ==
Montgomery only attended LSU for one semester before returning home due to academic issues and his mother falling ill. He said that, after returning home, "one day me and my brother, we was in the backyard and we were throwing the football. He was like, 'Look, bro, you could really do this.'" After posting videos of himself working out on Facebook, he received an offer to join a Miami-based flag football team and competed in a tournament in Las Vegas. He then briefly enrolled at the University of Houston to walk-on with the Houston Cougars, but was unsuccessful due to the COVID-19 pandemic.

Montgomery created a highlight reel from playing flag football and sent them to colleges around the U.S. Most schools were uninterested due to him having never played tackle football before, but eventually he was able to join the football team at Nicholls State University, an NCAA Division I FCS program. After sitting out the 2022 season due to lacking eligibility, he appeared in eight games during the 2023 season and recorded 12 catches for 171 yards.

Montgomery had run out of Division I eligibility, but through a connection with a flag football teammate was able to transfer to the Division III-level John Carroll Blue Streaks in 2024 and became their top wide receiver. During the 2024 season, he posted 57 receptions for 1,071 yards and a team-record 17 touchdowns, being named first-team All-Ohio Athletic Conference (OAC). He then was named a consensus Division III All-American after posting 119 catches for 1,528 yards and 15 touchdowns in 2025, helping the team compile a record of 12–2 with an appearance in the Division III semifinals. He broke the school records for single-season catches, receiving yards and receiving touchdowns. He was invited to the American Bowl, and after performing there, received an invite to the 2026 Senior Bowl. He was the only Division III player at both games and became the first John Carroll player ever to be invited to the Senior Bowl. His play at the Senior Bowl led to him receiving attention as an NFL draft prospect.

== Professional career ==
Pre-draft measurables
Height	Weight	Arm length	Hand span	Wingspan	40-yard dash	10-yard split	20-yard split	20-yard shuttle	Three-cone drill	Vertical jump	Broad jump
5 ft 11 1/2 in (1.82 m)	204 lb (93 kg)	32 3/8 in (0.82 m)	8 7/8 in (0.23 m)	6 ft 5 5/8 in (1.97 m)	4.59 s	1.57 s	2.55 s	4.38 s	7.30 s	35.5 in (0.90 m)	10 ft 8 in (3.25 m)
All values from Pro Day

Montgomery signed with the Tennessee Titans as an undrafted free agent after the conclusion of the 2026 NFL draft. He was waived by the Titans as a part of final roster cuts on August 30, but re–signed with the team's practice squad the next day.
