= Trey Lewis =

Trey Lewis may refer to:

- Trey Lewis (American football) (born 1985), American football player
- Trey Lewis (tennis) (born 1959), American tennis player
- Trey Lewis (basketball) (born 1992), American basketball player
- Trey Lewis (singer) (born c. 1987), American country music singer
