= Trey Haun =

US-born unicyclist from Ghana

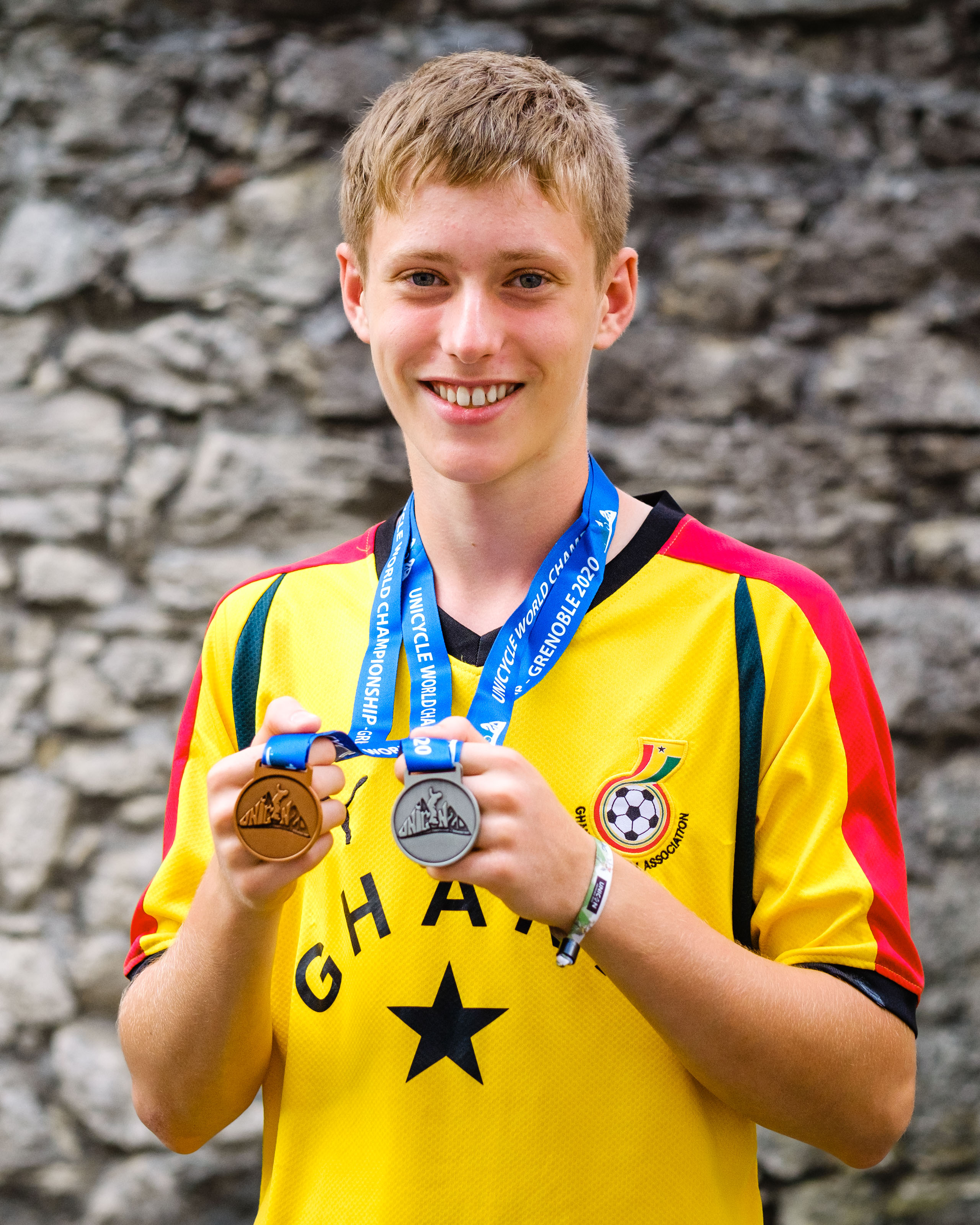
- Haun with medals won for Ghana at UNICON20

Personal information
- Full name: Roger Trey Haun III
- Nickname: Manboora Trey
- Born: 2006 (age 19–20) United States of America

Cycling career
- Sport: Cycling
- Current team: Mamprugu Unicycling Club
- Discipline: Unicycle
- Role: Rider

Amateur team
- 2022: Mamprugu Unicycling Club

Major wins
- UNICON22 - Vice-World Champion Flatland Expert Male; NAUCC 2025 - Flatland Expert Male
Medal record
Gold medal - NAUCC25 Flatland Expert Male
Gold medal - NAUCC25 FlatX2
Gold medal - NAUCC25 Unicycle Hockey
Silver medal - NAUCC25 X-style
Gold medal – UNICON21 Stillstand (Male 0-18)
Bronze medal – UNICON21 Wheel Walk (Male 17-18)
Silver medal – UNICON20 30m Wheel Walk (Male 15–16)
Bronze medal – UNICON20 50m One-Foot (Male 15–16)

Roger William Haun III (known as Trey or by his Mampruli name Manboora) is a US-born unicyclist raised in northeastern Ghana. He is the first person to win medals for Ghana at the Unicycle World Championships in youth categories, taking a silver and bronze in 2022 and gold and bronze in 2024. In 2025, he competed in the North American Unicycling Competition & Convention (NAUCC) and won the gold medal for Expert Male Flatland. At UNICON22, he took silver in Expert Male Flatland becoming the Vice-World Champion in the discipline.

== Early life ==
Haun was born in the US and later moved to Ghana with his parents. They arrived in Nalerigu in the North East Region.

== Career ==
Haun developed interest in unicycling during the COVID-19 pandemic of 2020. He joined the Unicycling Society of America in 2021 and reached USA Flatland Level 6 in 2024.

He represented Ghana at the 2022 Unicycle Convention and World Championships where he won two youth medals making it the nation's first medals in the competition. At UNICON 20, Haun initially won a youth silver medal in the 30m Wheel Walk Race (Male 15–16 category) and later won the youth bronze medal in the 50m One-Foot Race (Male 15–16 category).

In July 2024, Haun competed at UNICON 21 and won an age category bronze medal in the 30m Wheel Walk Race (Male 17-18 category) and an age category gold medal in the Stillstand competition (Male 0-18 category).

After moving to the US, Haun won several medals at NAUCC 2025 held in Rochester Hills, MI. He took the top Flatland title and placed 2nd in X-Style. Additionally he participated in team events, winning a gold medal on the "Mad For Hockey" hockey team and a gold medal in the new FlatX2 event with Dan Colvin.

In 2026, Haun again competed at UNICON in the disciplines of X-style and Flatland. He qualified for the X-Style Expert Male finals and ultimately placed 6th. Scoring the second highest score in the Flatland Expert Male qualifiers allowed him to advance directly to the finals bracket. There he defeated Ben Niediek (Germany) in the quarterfinals and Shuhei Kawai (Japan) in the semi-finals. He ultimately lost to defending world champion Stéphane Ranc in the final battle and became vice-world champion.

== Awards ==
Trey received the "Young Achievers & Innovators" award from Ghana's Head of State Awards Scheme on December 19, 2022, under the patronage of His Excellency Nana Akufo-Addo at Jubilee House in Accra. He was nominated for a GhanaWeb 2022 Youth Excellence Award in the category of Sports but lost to footballer Thomas Partey.

== Personal life ==
Haun's parents William Haun and Heidi Haun work at the Baptist Medical Centre in Nalerigu, Ghana. where his mother is a surgeon and his father is a multimedia specialist. Trey Haun is also a musician who composes and records folktronica under the moniker HM30s. He has released three albums. In 2024, he began studying Audio Production at Asbury University.
