= Tre (instrument) =

The tre (Khmer: ត្រែ) is an ancient Cambodian trumpet, being recreated in modern times. Different styles have been recorded in the artwork of Angkor Wat. Styles include long and short straight trumpets, slightly curved trumpets, and trumpets with a C-curve.
