= Trey Diller =

American football player (born 1990)

No. 17, 18
- Position: Wide receiver

Personal information
- Born: March 12, 1990 (age 36); Houston, Texas
- Listed height: 6 ft 2 in (1.88 m)
- Listed weight: 200 lb (91 kg)

Career information
- High school: The Woodlands (TX) College Park
- College: Sam Houston State University
- NFL draft: 2013: undrafted

Career history
- Carolina Panthers (2013)*; Los Angeles Kiss (2015)*; New Orleans Voodoo (2015)*
- * Offseason or practice squad member only

Trey Diller (born March 12, 1990) is an American former football wide receiver. He played college football at Sam Houston State University, and signed with the Carolina Panthers as an undrafted free agent in 2013.

== Early life ==
Diller attended The Woodlands College Park High School in The Woodlands, Texas. He caught 59 passes for 1,460 yards and 22 touchdowns, and helped lead the College Park Cavaliers to an undefeated regular season as a senior. He also returned two kickoffs and three punts for touchdowns.

== College career ==
Diller originally played at Wofford College, where he contributed to special teams. He made 5 tackles and also returned a kickoff for a touchdown.

Entering his sophomore season, Diller transferred from Wofford to Sam Houston State University in Hunstville, Texas, only a few miles north from where he went to high school. In his career, Diller caught 2,117 yards for 11 touchdowns at Sam Houston State, leading his team to two back-to-back FCS national championship appearances. He also returned two punts for touchdowns.

== Professional career ==
Pre-draft measurables
Height	Weight	Arm length	40-yard dash	10-yard split	20-yard split	20-yard shuttle	Three-cone drill	Vertical jump	Broad jump	Bench press
6 ft 1 1/2 in (1.87 m)	197 lb (89 kg)	33 1/8 in (0.84 m)	4.47 s	1.51 s	2.61 s	4.43 s	7.31 s	37 1/2 in (0.95 m)	10 ft 9 in (3.28 m)	11 reps
All values from NFL Pro Day Combine

Diller was ranked 1st in FCS receivers, 3rd overall in FCS athletes, and 82nd in overall NCAA players. He was predicted to be an early 7th round draft pick.

=== Carolina Panthers ===
After going undrafted, Diller signed with the Carolina Panthers on April 26, 2013. He caught 2 passes for 19 yards in the preseason, additionally returning 2 punts for a combined 41 yards, and making 2 tackles. Diller was cut from the team after being placed on injury reserve.

=== New Orleans Voodoo ===
After briefly practicing with the Los Angeles Kiss, Diller signed with the New Orleans VooDoo of the Arena Football League on March 5, 2015. He was released by the team before the season due to a reoccurring knee injury. He shortly thereafter retired from football.

== Personal life ==
Trey Diller retired from professional football after reoccurring injuries began to affect his personal life. He briefly coached at Sam Houston State but currently owns his own business, Inspire Productions.

On July 17, 2017, Diller was severely injured in a car accident near Luling, Texas, in which his truck rear-ended a semi-truck trailer at high speeds. He was hospitalized for several months, while driver, friend, and Army veteran Justin Hartley was fatally injured.
