= Trey Smith =

Trey or Tre Smith may refer to:

- Trey Smith (actor) (born 1992), son of actor Will Smith
- Trey Smith (offensive lineman) (born 1999), American football offensive lineman
- Tre Smith (running back) (born 1984), American football running back
- Trevor Smith (actor) (born 1970), Canadian television personality known as Tre Smith

== See also ==
- Torrey Smith (born 1989), American football wide receiver
- Troy Smith (disambiguation)
