= Tre Kelley =

American basketball player

Personal information
- Born: January 23, 1985 (age 41) Washington, D.C., U.S.
- Listed height: 6 ft 0 in (1.83 m)
- Listed weight: 187 lb (85 kg)

Career information
- High school: Dunbar (Washington, D.C.)
- College: South Carolina (2003–2007)
- NBA draft: 2007: undrafted
- Playing career: 2007–2020
- Position: Point guard

Career history
- 2007–2008: Cibona
- 2008: Panellinios
- 2008–2009: Eldan Ashkelon
- 2010: Dongguan Leopards
- 2010: Sagesse Beirut
- 2010: Oostende
- 2010–2011: Zhejiang Lions
- 2011: Austin Toros
- 2011: Marinos de Anzoátegui
- 2011–2012: Biancoblù Conad Bologna
- 2012: Marinos de Anzoátegui
- 2012–2013: Austin Toros
- 2013: Capitanes de Arecibo
- 2013–2014: Austin Toros
- 2014: Sioux Falls Skyforce
- 2014: Cocodrilos de Caracas
- 2014–2015: Sigma Barcellona
- 2015: Pertevniyal
- 2015–2016: Sioux Falls Skyforce
- 2016: Best Balıkesir
- 2016: Hapoel Holon
- 2016–2017: Best Balıkesir
- 2017: Gallitos de Isabela
- 2017: Socar Petkim
- 2017–2018: TED Ankara Kolejliler
- 2018–2019: Atlas Ferzol
- 2019–2020: Fort Wayne Mad Ants

Career highlights
- NBA D-League All-Star (2016); 2× Puerto Rican League champion (2011, 2012); Belgian Cup champion (2010); Frances Pomeroy Naismith Award (2007); First-team All-SEC (2007)
- Stats at Basketball Reference

Alfrie Eugene "Tre" Kelley III (born January 23, 1985) is an American former professional basketball player. He played college basketball for the South Carolina Gamecocks.

== Career ==
=== High school ===
Kelley grew up in Washington, D.C., where he led Dunbar High School to the inter-high league in Washington, D.C., and lost to Gonzaga in the city championship. He was a three-time all-conference selection and made the all-metropolitan team twice. He was two time Washington D.C. Gatorade player of the year. He averaged 29.7 PPG, 4 RPG and 7.5 APG his junior year and averaged 29 PPG, 5 RPG and 8.3 APG his senior year. Despite being recruited by UConn, Miami, Georgia Tech and West Virginia, he chose to play at the University of South Carolina.

=== College ===
As a freshman, Kelley posted averages of 5.1 points per game 1.4 rebounds per game 2.0 assists per game in 16.1 minutes per game. He had 6 points and 7 rebounds in No. 10 South Carolina's loss to No. 7 Memphis in the first round of the 2004 NCAA Tournament.

As a sophomore, Kelley played in all 33 games, starting 32, leading the team in assists, and tallying second most minutes on the team (1,013 minutes behind Carlos Powell's 1,113). He led the team in assists. Had 8 points and 3 assists in South Carolina's miraculous win over St. Joseph's in the Championship Game in the National Invitation Tournament at Madison Square Garden on March 31, 2005. Kelley earned the Most Assists Award in 2005.

As a junior, Kelley averaged 35.0 mpg, 12.5 ppg, 2.9 rpg, 4.6 apg and 1.3 spg, scored 20+ six times as well as set the school record for starts in a season with 38. He started 70 of USC's previous 71 games but did not start in the 2005 Senior Day vs. Ole Miss. He racked up 20 points and 7 assists in the National Invitation Tournament at Madison Square Garden on March 30, 2006, in which South Carolina routed Michigan 76–64. He was named to the 2006 SEC All-Tournament Team, the 2006 NIT All-Tournament Team. Earned the Most Assist Award in 2006.

As a senior, Kelley averaged 36.7 mpg, 18.9 ppg, 5.1 apg, and 2.6 rpg. Kelley received the 2007 Frances Pomeroy Naismith Award, as well as being a 2007 Chip Hilton Award Finalist. He was named to the 2007 Coaches First Team All-SEC, the 2007 AP First Team All-SEC, the 2007 Gamecock Basketball MVP, and earned the Most Assists Award in 2007.

Kelley started at point guard for three years. He is No. 2 all time in games played (134), No. 3 in assists (510), No. 3 in 3-point FG attempted (503), No. 3 in minutes played (3956), No. 3 in 3 PT FG made (167), and No. 9 all-time in career points (1488).

=== Professional ===
After going undrafted in the 2007 NBA draft, Kelley signed with KK Cibona.

Kelley was signed by the Miami Heat to a non-guaranteed contract on September 26, 2008, but was subsequently waived on October 3, 2008, to make room for Shaun Livingston. He played for Elitzur Ashkelon from the Israeli Basketball Super League during the 2008–09 season.

During the 2009–10 season, Kelley spent time in China and Lebanon. During the 2010–11 season, he spent time in Belgium, China, the NBA D-League, and Venezuela.

In 2011–12, Kelley played in Italy and Venezuela. He returned to the D-League in 2012–13 before playing for Capitanes de Arecibo during the 2013 BSN season.

On October 31, 2013, Kelley was reacquired by the Austin Toros of the NBA Development League. On January 4, 2014, he was traded to the Sioux Falls Skyforce. He later returned to Venezuela and played for Cocodrilos de Caracas.

On September 16, 2014, Kelley signed with Sigma Barcellona of the Italian second division. In January 2015, he left Italy and moved to Turkey where he signed with Pertevniyal.

On September 28, 2015, Kelley signed with the Miami Heat. He was waived on October 24 after appearing in two preseason games. On November 2, he signed with the Sioux Falls Skyforce as an affiliate player. On January 29, 2016, he was named in the East All-Star team for the 2016 NBA D-League All-Star Game. On February 19, he was waived by Sioux Falls. Three days later, he signed with Best Balıkesir of the Turkish Second League.

The 2016–17 season, Kelley started in Israel with Hapoel Holon but left the club after appearing in four games. On December 9, 2016, he returned to Best Balıkesir.

On December 21, 2017, Kelley signed with TED Ankara Kolejliler of the Basketbol Süper Ligi.

On December 6, 2019, Kelley was acquired by the Fort Wayne Mad Ants of the G League.
