= Trae =

Trae is a given name.

== Notable people with the name "Trae" include ==
- Trae Bell-Haynes (born 1995), Canadian basketball player
- Trae Coyle (born 2001), English footballer
- Trae Crowder (born 1986), American comedian
- Trae Elston (born 1994), American football player
- Trae Golden (born 1991), American basketball player
- Trae Taylor, American football player
- Trae Waynes (born 1992), American football player
- Trae Williams (born 1985), American football player
- Trae Williams (sprinter) (born 1997), Australian sprinter
- Trae Young (born 1998), American basketball player

== See also ==
- Trae tha Truth (born 1980), American hip hop recording artist
- Trae, an AI IDE by ByteDance
- Tray (given name), a page for people with the given name "Tray"
- Tre (given name), a page for people with the given name "Tre"
