= Druid City Dragons =

- Founded: 2006
- League: WBA 2006
- Team history: Druid City Dragons; 2006
- Based in: Tuscaloosa, Alabama
- Arena: Central High School West Gymnasium
- Colors: Red, Blue
- Owner: Mark Booth
- Head coach: John Douglas
- Championships: 0

The Druid City Dragons were a World Basketball Association franchise in Tuscaloosa, Alabama that played during the 2006 season.

The team was officially announced as Tuscaloosa's first professional basketball game at a press conference on Thursday, April 20, 2006. The team took its name to pay homage to the former Druid City High School, which has since been closed. The 21-game season included 10 home games at Central High School West Gymnasium. Tickets were moderately priced at $5 for adults and $3 for students in an effort to draw between 800 and 1,200 fans deemed necessary for the team to be financially sustainable.

The team would fold following the 2006 season after finishing in 5th place in the Western Division with an overall record of 9–11.

== Roster ==
- Najeeb Echols, power forward (5th overall selection in the 2006 WBA draft)
- Emmett Thomas, guard/forward
- Rickey Gibson, guard
- Josh Warren, guard
- Jeremy Law, guard
- Patrick Culver, center
- Mack McGadney, guard
- Kareem Ward, forward
- James Hall, forward
- Brandon Robinson

== 2006 results ==
- April 22: Lost 104–97 at Arkansas ArchAngels
- April 24: Won 86-77 vs. Marietta Storm Najeeb Echols scored 15 points and had 10 rebounds before a crowd of 350 spectators in the season's first home game.
- April 29: Won 114–84 at Anderson Heat
- May 5: Won 91-70 vs. Murfreesboro Musicians (at Tuscaloosa County High School)
- May 8: Lost 94-86 vs. Rome Gladiators
- May 12: Won 92-85 vs. Cartersville Warriors
- May 13: Lost 99–91 at Rome Gladiators
- May 19: Won by forfeit at Cleveland Majic
- May 20: Lost 90–88 at Rome Gladiators
- May 24: Won 82-74 vs. North Mississippi Tornadoes
- May 30: Won 110-108 vs. Rome Gladiators
- June 1: Won by forfeit at Cleveland Majic
- June 3: Lost 128–95 at Arkansas Arch Angels
- June 6: Won 117-103 vs. Cleveland Majic
- June 9: Lost 113–110 at Murfreesboro Musicians
- June 10: vs. Mississippi Hardhats
- June 15: Lost 139-121 vs. Murfreesboro Musicians
- June 16: Game cancelled against Magic City Court Kings
- June 17: vs. Cleveland Majic
- June 21: Lost by forfeit at Marietta Storm
- June 23: at Murfreesboro Musicians
