= List of 2005–06 NBA season transactions =

This is a detailed list of transactions during the 2005–06 NBA season.

== Retirement ==
Date	Name	Team(s) played (years)	Age	Notes	Ref.
July 14	Vlade Divac	Los Angeles Lakers (1989–1996, 2004–2005); Charlotte Hornets (1996–1998); Sacramento Kings (1998–2004)	37	Hired as the Lakers' European scout.	
August 18	Jerome Williams	Detroit Pistons (1996–2001); Toronto Raptors (2001–2003); Chicago Bulls (2003–2004); New York Knicks (2004–2005)	32		
August 19	Reggie Miller	Indiana Pacers (1987–2005)	39		
September 30	Steve Smith	Miami Heat (1991–1994, 2005); Atlanta Hawks (1994–1999); Portland Trail Blazers (1999–2001); San Antonio Spurs (2001–2003); New Orleans Hornets (2003–2004); Charlotte Bobcats (2004–2005)	36		
October 15	Jason Collier	Houston Rockets (2000–2003); Atlanta Hawks (2004–2005)	28	Died due to an enlarged heart.	
October 17	Allan Houston	Detroit Pistons (1993–1996); New York Knicks (1996–2005)	34	Retired due to a knee injury	
October 18	Shawn Bradley	Philadelphia 76ers (1993–1995); New Jersey Nets (1995–1997); Dallas Mavericks (1997–2005)	33	1997 NBA Blocks leader	
November 2	George Lynch	Los Angeles Lakers (1993–1996); Vancouver Grizzlies (1996–1998); Philadelphia 76ers (1999–2001); Charlotte Hornets / New Orleans Hornets (2001–2005)	35		
February 4	Jonathan Bender	Indiana Pacers (1999–2006)	25	Made a comeback in 2009 with the Knicks.	
March 24	Jamal Mashburn	Dallas Mavericks (1993–1997); Miami Heat (1997–2000); Charlotte Hornets / New Orleans Hornets (2000–2004); Philadelphia 76ers (2004–2006)	33	Retired due to chronic knee problems	
April 17	Fred Hoiberg	Indiana Pacers (1995–1999); Chicago Bulls (1999–2003); Minnesota Timberwolves (2003–2005)	33	Retired due to an enlarged aortic root	
April 17	Greg Ostertag	Utah Jazz (1995–2004, 2005–2006); Sacramento Kings (2004–2005)	33	Made a comeback in 2011 in the D-League.	
May 5	Doug Overton	Washington Bullets (1992–1995); Denver Nuggets (1995–1996); Philadelphia 76ers (1996–1998, 1999); Orlando Magic (1999); New Jersey Nets (1999, 2001, 2002); Boston Celtics (1999–2000); Charlotte Hornets (2001); Los Angeles Clippers (2003–2004)	34	Hired as an assistant coach for Saint Joseph's.	
May 24	Nick Van Exel	Los Angeles Lakers (1993–1998); Denver Nuggets (1998–2002); Dallas Mavericks (2002–2003); Golden State Warriors (2003–2004); Portland Trail Blazers (2004–2005); San Antonio Spurs (2005–2006)	34		

== Front office movements ==
=== Head coach changes ===
- Bob Hill became the head coach of the Seattle SuperSonics.
- Isiah Thomas became head coach of the New York Knicks, succeeding Larry Brown.
- Stan Van Gundy resigned as head coach of the Miami Heat. Pat Riley was named interim coach.
- Nate McMillan was named the head coach of the Portland Trail Blazers.
- Terry Stotts was named the new head coach of the Milwaukee Bucks.
- Bob Weiss was named the head coach of the Seattle SuperSonics (now called the Oklahoma City Thunder).

=== Assistant coach changes ===
- Henry Bibby becomes an assistant coach of the 76ers.
- Larry Krystkowiak becomes an assistant coach of the Milwaukee Bucks.
- Gordon Chiesa becomes an assistant coach for the SuperSonics.
- Eric Musselman becomes the head coach of the Kings.
- Randy Wittman becomes an assistant coach for the Timberwolves.
- Henry Bibby becomes an assistant coach for the 76ers.
- Gene Keady becomes an assistant coach for Toronto.
- Scott Adubato becomes an assistant coach of Memphis Grizzlies.
- Randy Wittman, Mark Bryant and Morlon Wiley are named new assistant coaches for the Orlando Magic.
- Chip Engelland is named assistant coach of the San Antonio Spurs.
- Brian James is named assistant coach of the Bucks.

=== General manager changes ===
- Jeff Bower becomes general manager of the Hornets.
- Maury Hanks becomes general manager for the New Jersey Nets (now called Brooklyn Nets).
- Lance Blanks and Chris Grant become assistant general managers of the Cleveland Cavaliers.
- Orlando Magic names Dave Twardzik and Otis Smith assistant general managers.
- Cleveland Cavaliers hire Danny Ferry as general manager.
- Minnesota Timberwolves resign Jim Stack.
- Cleveland Cavaliers name Lance Blanks and Chris Grant assistant general managers.

=== Team president changes ===
- Maurizio Gherardini was named vice president of the Toronto Raptors on June 22, 2005.
- Alex Martins is named executive vice president of the Orlando Magic.

== Player movement ==
=== Trades ===
June
June 7	To Utah Jazz: 2008 2nd round pick (Ante Tomić)	To Philadelphia 76ers: 2005 2nd round pick (Alex Acker)
June 28 (Draft-day trades)	To Portland Trail Blazers: 2005 1st round picks (Martell Webster and Linas Kleiza); 2006 1st round pick (Joel Freeland)	To Utah Jazz: 2005 1st round pick (Deron Williams)
June 28 (Draft-day trades)	To Orlando Magic: 2006 2nd round pick (Ejike Ugboaja); Future considerations	To Cleveland Cavaliers: Draft rights to Martynas Andriuškevičius
June 28 (Draft-day trades)	To Seattle SuperSonics: 2006 2nd round pick (Yotam Halperin); 2007 2nd round pick (Carl Landry); Cash	To Memphis Grizzlies: Draft rights to (Lawrence Roberts)
June 28 (Draft-day trades)	To Phoenix Suns: Kurt Thomas; Draft rights to Dijon Thompson	To New York Knicks: Quentin Richardson; Draft rights to Nate Robinson; Future considerations
June 28 (Draft-day trades)	To Cleveland Cavaliers: 2006 2nd round pick (Lior Eliyahu)	To Milwaukee Bucks: Jiří Welsch
June 28 (Draft-day trades)	To Denver Nuggets: Draft rights to Linas Kleiza and Ricky Sánchez	To Portland Trail Blazers: Draft rights to Jarrett Jack
June 28 (Draft-day trades)	To Phoenix Suns: Future considerations	To Orlando Magic: Draft rights to Marcin Gortat
August
August 2
August 2	To Memphis Grizzlies: Bobby Jackson; Greg Ostertag	To Sacramento Kings: Bonzi Wells
August 2	Five-team trade	
August 2	To Boston Celtics: Albert Miralles (from Miami); Qyntel Woods (from Miami); 2006 2nd round pick (Edin Bavčić) (from Miami); 2008 2nd round pick (Nikola Peković) (from Miami); Curtis Borchardt (from Utah)	To Miami Heat: Antoine Walker (from Boston); Andre Emmett (from Memphis); James Posey (from Memphis); Jason Williams (from Memphis); Draft rights to Roberto Dueñas (from New Orleans/Oklahoma City)
August 2	To New Orleans/Oklahoma City Hornets: Rasual Butler (from Miami); Kirk Snyder (from Utah)	
August 2	To Memphis Grizzlies: Eddie Jones (from Miami); Raül López (from Utah)	To Utah Jazz: Greg Ostertag (from Memphis)
August 2	To Washington Wizards: Chucky Atkins; Caron Butler	To Los Angeles Lakers: Kwame Brown; Laron Profit
August 2	To Charlotte Bobcats: 2006 2nd round pick (Ryan Hollins)	To Sacramento Kings: Jason Hart
August 2	To Phoenix Suns: 2007 2nd round pick (top 55 protected; never received it)	To Charlotte Bobcats: Jake Voskuhl
August 9	To New Jersey Nets: Marc Jackson	To Philadelphia 76ers: 2006 2nd round pick (conditional and wasn't exercised)
August 12	To Minnesota Timberwolves: Marko Jarić; Lionel Chalmers	To Los Angeles Clippers: Sam Cassell; 2012 1st round pick (Austin Rivers)
August 19	To Atlanta Hawks: Joe Johnson	To Phoenix Suns: Boris Diaw; 2006 1st round pick (Rajon Rondo); 2008 1st round pick (Robin Lopez)
August 25	To Indiana Pacers: 2008 2nd round pick (Mike Taylor)	To Phoenix Suns: James Jones (sign-and-trade)
September
September 30	To New Orleans/Oklahoma City Hornets: 2006 2nd round pick (Edin Bavčić)	To Boston Celtics: Dan Dickau
October
October 4	To Toronto Raptors: Mike James	To Houston Rockets: Rafer Alston
October 4	To Chicago Bulls: Jermaine Jackson; Mike Sweetney; Tim Thomas; 2006 1st round pick (LaMarcus Aldridge); 2007 1st round pick (Joakim Noah); 2007 2nd round pick (Kyrylo Fesenko); 2009 2nd round pick (Jon Brockman)	To New York Knicks: Eddy Curry; Antonio Davis; 2007 1st round pick (Wilson Chandler)
October 26	To Los Angeles Lakers: 2007 2nd round pick (Sun Yue)	To Charlotte Bobcats: Jumaine Jones
October 26	To New Orleans/Oklahoma City Hornets: Desmond Mason; 2006 1st round pick (Cedric Simmons)	To Milwaukee Bucks: Jamaal Magloire
October 31	To Detroit Pistons: 2009 2nd round pick (DaJuan Summers)	To Minnesota Timberwolves: Ronald Dupree
January
January 25	To Indiana Pacers: Peja Stojaković	To Sacramento Kings: Ron Artest
January 26	To Boston Celtics: Dwayne Jones; Michael Olowokandi; Wally Szczerbiak; 2009 1st round pick (Jonny Flynn)	To Minnesota Timberwolves: Marcus Banks; Mark Blount; Ricky Davis; Justin Reed; 2006 2nd round pick (Craig Smith); 2008 2nd round pick (Nikola Peković)
January 26	To Minnesota Timberwolves: 2006 2nd round pick (Loukas Mavrokefalidis)	To Phoenix Suns: Nikoloz Tskitishvili
January 31	To Toronto Raptors: 2006 2nd round pick (Edin Bavčić); 2009 2nd round pick (Jack McClinton)	To New Orleans/Oklahoma City Hornets: Aaron Williams
February
February 9	To Charlotte Bobcats: Lonny Baxter	To Houston Rockets: Keith Bogans
February 13	To New Orleans/Oklahoma City Hornets: Moochie Norris	To Houston Rockets: Maciej Lampe
February 14	To Seattle SuperSonics: Chris Wilcox	To Los Angeles Clippers: Vladimir Radmanović
February 15	To Detroit Pistons: Kelvin Cato; 2007 1st round pick (Rodney Stuckey)	To Orlando Magic: Carlos Arroyo; Darko Miličić
February 22	To New York Knicks: Steve Francis	To Orlando Magic: Trevor Ariza; Penny Hardaway
February 23	Four-team trade	
February 23	To Denver Nuggets: Ruben Patterson (from Portland); Charles Smith (from Portland); Reggie Evans (from Seattle)	To Portland Trail Blazers: Voshon Lenard (from Denver); Brian Skinner (from Sacramento)
February 23	To Seattle SuperSonics: Bryon Russell (from Denver); Earl Watson (from Denver); 2008 2nd round pick (DeVon Hardin) (from Denver)	To Sacramento Kings: Sergei Monia (from Portland); Vitaly Potapenko (from Seattle)
February 23	To Philadelphia 76ers: 2006 2nd round pick	To Cleveland Cavaliers: Lee Nailon; 2006 2nd round pick (Daniel Gibson)
February 23	To Houston Rockets: Gerald Fitch; Trade exception	To Miami Heat: Derek Anderson
February 23	To Seattle SuperSonics: Mike Wilks	To Cleveland Cavaliers: Ronald Murray
February 23	To New Jersey Nets: Boštjan Nachbar	To New Orleans/Oklahoma City Hornets: Marc Jackson; Linton Johnson; Cash

=== Releases ===
Player	Date waived	Former team
Lucious Harris	June 16	Cleveland Cavaliers
Mamadou N'Diaye	June 29	Los Angeles Clippers
Rodney White	June 30	Golden State Warriors
Predrag Drobnjak	July 1	Atlanta Hawks
Obinna Ekezie	July 5	Atlanta Hawks
James Thomas	July 5	Atlanta Hawks
Ronny Turiaf	July 22	Los Angeles Lakers (had open-heart surgery; sidelined him until Jan. 2006)
Nick Van Exel	August 4	Portland Trail Blazers
Vin Baker*	August 15	Boston Celtics
Troy Bell*	August 15	Memphis Grizzlies
Derrick Coleman*	August 15	Detroit Pistons
Howard Eisley*	August 15	Phoenix Suns
Reggie Miller*	August 15	Indiana Pacers
Alonzo Mourning*	August 15	Toronto Raptors
Wesley Person*	August 15	Miami Heat
Eddie Robinson*	August 15	Chicago Bulls
Calvin Booth*	August 17	Milwaukee Bucks
Brian Grant*	August 17	Los Angeles Lakers
Fred Hoiberg*	August 17	Minnesota Timberwolves
Ron Mercer*	August 17	New Jersey Nets
Clarence Weatherspoon*	August 17	Houston Rockets
Jerome Williams*	August 17	New York Knicks
Raül López	August 17	Memphis Grizzlies
Doug Christie*	August 18	Orlando Magic
Aaron McKie*	August 19	Philadelphia 76ers
Michael Finley*	August 23	Dallas Mavericks
Robert Traylor	August 30	New Jersey Nets
Luis Flores	August 30	Denver Nuggets
Lamond Murray	September 2	Toronto Raptors
Luke Schenscher	October 3	Denver Nuggets
Mark Strickland	October 4	Atlanta Hawks
Omar Thomas	October 4	Seattle SuperSonics
Qyntel Woods	October 4	Boston Celtics
Frank Williams	October 5	Los Angeles Clippers
Vlade Divac	October 6	Los Angeles Lakers
Vin Baker	October 7	Houston Rockets
Tre Simmons	October 7	Seattle SuperSonics
Ezra Williams	October 7	Seattle SuperSonics
Omar Cook	October 10	Chicago Bulls
Samo Udrih	October 10	Dallas Mavericks
Anwar Ferguson	October 10	Sacramento Kings
Dan Langhi	October 10	Sacramento Kings
Jan Jagla	October 11	Los Angeles Clippers
Amal McCaskill	October 11	Los Angeles Clippers
Ime Udoka	October 11	Philadelphia 76ers
Kevin Braswell	October 12	Miami Heat
Alejandro Carmona Sanchez	October 12	Detroit Pistons
Mengke Bateer	October 12	Cleveland Cavaliers
Charlie Ward	October 12	Houston Rockets
Matt Freije	October 14	Orlando Magic
Felipe López	October 14	Orlando Magic
Roderick Riley	October 14	Atlanta Hawks
Anthony Wilkins	October 14	Atlanta Hawks
Jawad Williams	October 15	San Antonio Spurs
Kyle Bailey	October 15	San Antonio Spurs
Todd Day	October 16	Detroit Pistons
Desmon Farmer	October 16	Indiana Pacers
Mark Karcher	October 16	Utah Jazz
Cory Violette	October 16	Utah Jazz
Marcus Campbell	October 17	Charlotte Bobcats
Erik Daniels	October 17	Sacramento Kings
Allan Houston	October 17	New York Knicks
Herve Lamizana	October 17	Philadelphia 76ers
Mamadou N'Diaye	October 17	Golden State Warriors
Matt Nelson	October 17	Charlotte Bobcats
Rickey Paulding	October 17	Sacramento Kings
Troy Bell	October 18	New Orleans/Oklahoma City Hornets
Shawn Bradley	October 18	Dallas Mavericks
Will Conroy	October 18	Los Angeles Lakers
Jermaine Jackson	October 18	Chicago Bulls
Sam Clancy, Jr.	October 19	Portland Trail Blazers
Roger Powell	October 20	Seattle SuperSonics
Filiberto Rivera	October 20	Cleveland Cavaliers
Jared Reiner	October 20	Los Angeles Clippers
Fred Vinson	October 20	Los Angeles Clippers
Erick Strickland	October 21	Dallas Mavericks
Tierre Brown	October 22	Toronto Raptors
Bryant Matthews	October 22	Toronto Raptors
Robert Pack	October 22	Toronto Raptors
Erick Strickland	October 23	Milwaukee Bucks
Adam Chubb	October 24	New Jersey Nets
Arthur Johnson	October 24	New Jersey Nets
Ricky Shields	October 24	New Jersey Nets
Kimani Ffriend	October 24	Memphis Grizzlies
Kennedy Winston	October 24	Memphis Grizzlies
Will Bynum	October 25	Boston Celtics
Jason Capel	October 25	Charlotte Bobcats
D'or Fischer	October 25	Charlotte Bobcats
Andreas Glyniadakis	October 25	Detroit Pistons
Chuck Hayes	October 25	Houston Rockets
Keith Langford	October 25	Houston Rockets
Steven Barber	October 26	New York Knicks
Jamison Brewer	October 26	New York Knicks
Kaniel Dickens	October 26	Dallas Mavericks
Otis George	October 26	New York Knicks
Sharrod Ford	October 26	San Antonio Spurs
Stephen Graham	October 26	San Antonio Spurs
Melvin Sanders	October 26	San Antonio Spurs
Luke Schenscher	October 26	Sacramento Kings
Deji Akindele	October 27	Golden State Warriors
Kelenna Azubuike	October 27	Cleveland Cavaliers
Andre Barrett	October 27	Milwaukee Bucks
Tony Bobbitt	October 27	Los Angeles Lakers
Curtis Borchardt	October 27	Boston Celtics
Damone Brown	October 27	Indiana Pacers
Lionel Chalmers	October 27	Minnesota Timberwolves
Eric Chenowith	October 27	Denver Nuggets
Nigel Dixon	October 27	Denver Nuggets
Justin Davis	October 27	Golden State Warriors
Obinna Ekezie	October 27	Cleveland Cavaliers
Luis Flores	October 27	Sacramento Kings
Hiram Fuller	October 27	Washington Wizards
Alex Ribeiro Garcia	October 27	New Orleans/Oklahoma City Hornets
Anthony Grundy	October 27	Atlanta Hawks
Randy Holcomb	October 27	Chicago Bulls
Ryan Humphrey	October 27	Minnesota Timberwolves
Jimmie Hunter	October 27	Indiana Pacers
James Lang	October 27	Utah Jazz
Lee Seung-jun	October 27	Sacramento Kings
Anthony Lever-Pedroza	October 27	Phoenix Suns
John Lucas III	October 27	Minnesota Timberwolves
Antonio Meeking	October 27	Charlotte Bobcats
Toree Norris	October 27	Toronto Raptors
Spencer Nelson	October 27	Utah Jazz
Adam Parada	October 27	Los Angeles Lakers
Mark Pope	October 27	Denver Nuggets
Theron Smith	October 27	Denver Nuggets
Tommy Smith	October 27	Milwaukee Bucks
Billy Thomas	October 27	Washington Wizards
Jahidi White	October 27	Cleveland Cavaliers
Ajani Williams	October 27	Atlanta Hawks
Carey Williams	October 27	Toronto Raptors
Ray Young	October 27	Golden State Warriors
Derrick Zimmerman	October 27	New Jersey Nets
Tariq Abdul-Wahad	October 28	Dallas Mavericks
Steve Castleberry	October 28	Philadelphia 76ers
Olu Famutimi	October 28	Philadelphia 76ers
George Lynch	October 28	New Orleans/Oklahoma City Hornets
Rodney White	October 28	Los Angeles Clippers
Noel Felix	October 29	Seattle SuperSonics
Alex Scales	October 29	Seattle SuperSonics
Corie Blount	October 31	Los Angeles Lakers
Ruben Boumtje-Boumtje	October 31	Orlando Magic
Ndudi Ebi	October 31	Minnesota Timberwolves
Andre Emmett	October 31	Miami Heat
Gerald Fitch	October 31	Miami Heat
Ken Johnson	October 31	Orlando Magic
Darius Rice	October 31	Miami Heat
Yuta Tabuse	October 31	Los Angeles Clippers
Lucas Tischer	November 1	Phoenix Suns
Kasib Powell	November 2	Chicago Bulls
Ben Handlogten	November 8	New Jersey Nets
Anthony Goldwire	November 16	Los Angeles Clippers
Matt Walsh	November 18	Miami Heat
Melvin Sanders	November 19	San Antonio Spurs
John Thomas	November 22	Memphis Grizzlies
Doug Christie	November 24	Dallas Mavericks
Josh Davis	November 24	Milwaukee Bucks
Alex Scales	November 28	San Antonio Spurs
Matt Barnes	December 3	New York Knicks
Dion Glover	December 5	Houston Rockets
Deng Gai	December 8	Philadelphia 76ers
James Thomas	December 8	Philadelphia 76ers
Josh Davis	December 16	Milwaukee Bucks
Sharrod Ford	December 24	Phoenix Suns
Stephen Graham	December 29	Houston Rockets
Howard Eisley	January 3	Los Angeles Clippers
Mateen Cleaves	January 4	Seattle SuperSonics
Josh Davis	January 4	Houston Rockets
John Lucas III	January 4	Houston Rockets
Sean Banks	January 5	New Orleans/Oklahoma City Hornets
Zendon Hamilton	January 5	Cleveland Cavaliers
Aaron Miles	January 5	Golden State Warriors
Jared Reiner	January 5	Phoenix Suns
John Thomas	January 5	Atlanta Hawks
Samaki Walker	January 5	Indiana Pacers
Laron Profit	January 17	Los Angeles Lakers
Chucky Atkins	January 18	Washington Wizards
Chris Andersen	January 27	New Orleans/Oklahoma City Hornets
Terence Morris	February 15	Orlando Magic
Bo Outlaw	February 22	Orlando Magic
Tony Delk	February 24	Atlanta Hawks
Penny Hardaway	February 24	Orlando Magic
Lee Nailon	February 24	Cleveland Cavaliers
Rick Brunson	February 28	Seattle SuperSonics
Jon Barry	March 1	Houston Rockets
Jim Jackson	March 1	Phoenix Suns
Bryon Russell	March 1	Seattle SuperSonics
Charles Smith	March 1	Denver Nuggets
Tim Thomas	March 1	Chicago Bulls
Slava Medvedenko	March 6	Los Angeles Lakers
Gerald Fitch	March 13	Houston Rockets
Richie Frahm	March 16	Minnesota Timberwolves
Antonio Davis	March 23	Toronto Raptors
Jamal Mashburn	March 24	Philadelphia 76ers
Kareem Rush	March 31	Charlotte Bobcats
Jackson Vroman	March 31	New Orleans/Oklahoma City Hornets

=== Free Agency ===
Player	Date signed	New team	Former team	Ref
Earl Watson	July 7	Denver Nuggets	Memphis Grizzlies	
Chris Andersen	August 2	New Orleans/Oklahoma City Hornets		
Raja Bell	August 2	Phoenix Suns	Utah Jazz	
José Calderón	August 2	Toronto Raptors	Tau Cerámica	
Samuel Dalembert	August 2	Philadelphia 76ers		
Antonio Daniels	August 2	Washington Wizards	Seattle SuperSonics	
Udonis Haslem	August 2	Miami Heat		
Robert Horry	August 2	San Antonio Spurs		
Jerome James	August 2	New York Knicks	Seattle SuperSonics	
Arvydas Macijauskas	August 2	New Orleans/Oklahoma City Hornets	Tau Cerámica	
Mark Madsen	August 2	Minnesota Timberwolves		
Cuttino Mobley	August 2	Los Angeles Clippers	Sacramento Kings	
Boštjan Nachbar	August 2	New Orleans/Oklahoma City Hornets	Houston Rockets	
Shaquille O'Neal	August 2	Miami Heat		
Fabricio Oberto	August 2	San Antonio Spurs	Pamesa Valencia	
Smush Parker	August 2	Los Angeles Lakers	Phoenix Suns	
Josh Powell	August 2	Dallas Mavericks	Southern Crescent Lightning	
Brian Scalabrine	August 2	Boston Celtics	New Jersey Nets	
Stromile Swift	August 2	Houston Rockets	Memphis Grizzlies	
Ray Allen	August 3	Seattle SuperSonics		
Hiram Fuller	August 3	Washington Wizards	Atlanta Hawks	
Željko Rebrača	August 3	Los Angeles Clippers		
Juan Dixon	August 4	Portland Trail Blazers	Washington Wizards	
Larry Hughes	August 4	Cleveland Cavaliers	Washington Wizards	
Toni Kukoč	August 4	Milwaukee Bucks		
Donyell Marshall	August 4	Cleveland Cavaliers	Toronto Raptors	
Clifford Robinson	August 4	New Jersey Nets		
Charles Smith	August 4	Portland Trail Blazers	Scavolini Pesaro	
Pape Sow RFA	August 4	Toronto Raptors		
Earl Barron	August 5	Miami Heat	Red Bull Barako	
Ryan Bowen	August 5	Houston Rockets		
Rick Brunson	August 5	Seattle SuperSonics	Los Angeles Clippers	
Antonio Meeking	August 5	Charlotte Bobcats	Hemofarm	
Michael Ruffin	August 5	Washington Wizards		
Damon Stoudamire	August 5	Memphis Grizzlies	Portland Trail Blazers	
Nikoloz Tskitishvili	August 6	Minnesota Timberwolves	Golden State Warriors	
Jamal Sampson	August 8	Sacramento Kings	Charlotte Bobcats	
Bobby Simmons	August 8	Milwaukee Bucks	Los Angeles Clippers	
Luke Walton	August 8	Los Angeles Lakers		
Eddie Griffin	August 10	Minnesota Timberwolves	Houston Rockets	
Jon Barry	August 11	Houston Rockets		
Gerald Fitch	August 11	Miami Heat	Khimik Yuzhny	
Šarūnas Jasikevičius	August 11	Indiana Pacers	Maccabi Tel Aviv	
Kyle Korver	August 11	Philadelphia 76ers		
Jeff McInnis	August 11	New Jersey Nets	Cleveland Cavaliers	
Zaza Pachulia RFA	August 11	Atlanta Hawks	Milwaukee Bucks (refused to match offer sheet)	
Shareef Abdur-Rahim	August 12	Sacramento Kings	Portland Trail Blazers (previously traded to New Jersey Nets)	
Dan Gadzuric	August 12	Milwaukee Bucks		
Steven Hunter	August 12	Philadelphia 76ers	Phoenix Suns	
Vitaly Potapenko	August 12	Seattle SuperSonics		
Kareem Rush	August 12	Charlotte Bobcats		
Michael Redd	August 13	Milwaukee Bucks		
Darrell Armstrong	August 15	Dallas Mavericks		
Chris Duhon	August 15	Chicago Bulls (matched offer sheet from Toronto)		
Jimmie Hunter	August 16	Indiana Pacers	Nuova AMG Sebastiani Basket Napoli	
James Singleton	August 16	Los Angeles Clippers	Armani Jeans Milano	
Pat Burke	August 17	Phoenix Suns	Real Madrid	
Charlie Bell	August 18	Milwaukee Bucks	Leche Río Breogán	
DeSagana Diop	August 18	Dallas Mavericks	Cleveland Cavaliers	
Brian Grant	August 18	Phoenix Suns	Los Angeles Lakers	
Doug Christie	August 19	Dallas Mavericks	Orlando Magic	
Brevin Knight	August 19	Charlotte Bobcats		
Ruben Boumtje-Boumtje	August 22	Orlando Magic	Fayetteville Patriots	
Derek Anderson	August 23	Houston Rockets	Portland Trail Blazers	
John Edwards	August 23	Atlanta Hawks	Indiana Pacers	
Tyronn Lue	August 23	Atlanta Hawks		
Damien Wilkins	August 23	Seattle SuperSonics (matched offer sheet from Minnesota)		
Matt Bonner	August 24	Toronto Raptors		
Linton Johnson	August 24	New Jersey Nets	San Antonio Spurs	
Robert Traylor	August 24	New Jersey Nets	Cleveland Cavaliers	
Dale Davis	August 25	Detroit Pistons	Indiana Pacers	
Othella Harrington	August 25	Chicago Bulls		
Aaron McKie	August 26	Los Angeles Lakers	Philadelphia 76ers	
Dikembe Mutombo	August 26	Houston Rockets		
Ervin Johnson	August 29	Milwaukee Bucks	Minnesota Timberwolves	
Nick Van Exel	August 29	San Antonio Spurs	Portland Trail Blazers	
Mikki Moore	August 30	Seattle SuperSonics	Los Angeles Clippers	
Kevin Burleson	August 31	Charlotte Bobcats	Walter Tigers Tübingen	
Matt Carroll	August 31	Charlotte Bobcats		
Malik Allen	September 1	Chicago Bulls	Charlotte Bobcats	
Damone Brown	September 1	Indiana Pacers	Washington Wizards	
Michael Finley	September 1	San Antonio Spurs	Dallas Mavericks	
Milt Palacio	September 1	Utah Jazz	Toronto Raptors	
Maurice Evans RFA	September 2	Detroit Pistons	Sacramento Kings (refused to match offer sheet)	
Sean Marks	September 2	San Antonio Spurs		
Kimani Ffriend	September 6	Memphis Grizzlies	Casti Group	
Earl Watson	September 6	Denver Nuggets	Memphis Grizzlies	
Lonny Baxter	September 8	Houston Rockets	Panathinaikos	
Damon Jones	September 8	Cleveland Cavaliers	Miami Heat	
Lamond Murray	September 8	New Jersey Nets	Toronto Raptors	
Scott Padgett	September 8	New Jersey Nets	Houston Rockets	
Anthony Carter	September 9	Minnesota Timberwolves		
Eddie House	September 9	Phoenix Suns	Sacramento Kings	
Melvin Sanders	September 13	San Antonio Spurs	Oostende	
DerMarr Johnson	September 13	Denver Nuggets		
Devin Brown	September 14	Utah Jazz	San Antonio Spurs	
Yuta Tabuse	September 15	Los Angeles Clippers	Phoenix Suns	
Shandon Anderson	September 19	Miami Heat		
Vladimir Radmanović	September 19	Seattle SuperSonics		
Tyson Chandler	September 20	Chicago Bulls		
Ronald Murray	September 21	Seattle SuperSonics		
James Lang	September 22	Utah Jazz	Club Básquet Inca	
Gary Payton	September 22	Miami Heat	Boston Celtics	
Darius Songaila	September 23	Chicago Bulls	Sacramento Kings	
Luis Flores	September 24	Sacramento Kings	Denver Nuggets	
Rickey Paulding	September 24	Sacramento Kings	Hapoel Jerusalem	
Richie Frahm	September 26	Minnesota Timberwolves	Portland Trail Blazers	
Alex Garcia	September 26	New Orleans/Oklahoma City Hornets		
Zydrunas Ilgauskas	September 26	Cleveland Cavaliers		
Samaki Walker	September 26	Indiana Pacers	Washington Wizards	
Gerald Wallace	September 26	Charlotte Bobcats		
Andre Barrett	September 27	Milwaukee Bucks	Orlando Magic	
Jason Capel	September 27	Charlotte Bobcats	Aisin Seahorses	
Justin Davis	September 27	Golden State Warriors	?	
Alan Henderson	September 27	Cleveland Cavaliers	Dallas Mavericks	
Jan Jagla	September 27	Los Angeles Clippers	Artland Dragons	
Boniface N'Dong	September 27	Los Angeles Clippers	Dijon Basket	
Jared Reiner	September 27	Los Angeles Clippers	Chicago Bulls	
Tommy Smith	September 27	Milwaukee Bucks	Yakima Sun Kings	
Fred Vinson	September 27	Los Angeles Clippers	Guaiqueríes de Margarita	
Ajani Williams	September 27	Atlanta Hawks	Sofia	
Ray Young	September 27	Golden State Warriors	?	
Anthony Grundy	September 28	San Antonio Spurs	Panteras de Miranda	
Brandon Hunter	September 28	Milwaukee Bucks	Orlando Magic	
Ken Johnson	September 28	Orlando Magic	Bourg-en-Bresse	
Terence Morris	September 28	Orlando Magic	Apollon Patras	
Lee Nailon	September 28	Philadelphia 76ers	New Orleans/Oklahoma City Hornets	
Steve Blake RFA	September 29	Portland Trail Blazers	Washington Wizards (refused to match offer sheet)	
Matt Freije	September 29	Orlando Magic	New Orleans Hornets	
Felipe López	September 29	Orlando Magic	Caballeros Santiago	
Bo Outlaw	September 29	Orlando Magic	Phoenix Suns	
Roderick Riley	September 29	Atlanta Hawks	MBC Halle	
Anthony Wilkins	September 29	Atlanta Hawks	Ockelbo BBK	
Keith Bogans	September 30	Charlotte Bobcats		
Calvin Booth	September 30	Washington Wizards	Milwaukee Bucks	
Greg Buckner	September 30	Denver Nuggets		
Mateen Cleaves	September 30	Seattle SuperSonics		
Josh Davis	September 30	Milwaukee Bucks	Philadelphia 76ers	
Desmon Farmer	September 30	Indiana Pacers	Prokom Trefl	
Dion Glover	September 30	Houston Rockets	San Antonio Spurs	
Mark Karcher	September 30	Utah Jazz	Vichy	
Keith McLeod	September 30	Utah Jazz		
Awvee Storey	September 30	Washington Wizards	Wonju Dongbu Promy	
Mark Strickland	September 30	Atlanta Hawks	Jahmour Blue Stars	
Billy Thomas	September 30	Washington Wizards	New Jersey Jets	
Cory Violette	September 30	Utah Jazz	Aurora Jesi	
Troy Bell	October 1	New Orleans/Oklahoma City Hornets	Real Madrid	
Noel Felix	October 2	Seattle SuperSonics	Yakima Sun Kings	
Alex Scales	October 2	Seattle SuperSonics	Seoul Samsung Thunders	
Steven Barber	October 3	New York Knicks		
Corie Blount	October 3	Los Angeles Lakers	Toronto Raptors	
Kevin Braswell	October 3	Miami Heat	Pınar Karşıyaka	
Tierre Brown	October 3	Toronto Raptors	Los Angeles Lakers	
Alejandro Sánchez	October 3	Detroit Pistons	VAQ. de Bayamón	
Omar Cook	October 3	Chicago Bulls	Toronto Raptors	
Erik Daniels	October 3	Sacramento Kings		
Todd Day	October 3	Detroit Pistons	Arkansas RimRockers	
Nigel Dixon	October 3	Denver Nuggets		
Obinna Ekezie	October 3	Cleveland Cavaliers	Atlanta Hawks	
Reggie Evans	October 3	Seattle SuperSonics		
Anwar Ferguson	October 3	Sacramento Kings	Arkansas ArchAngels	
Andreas Glyniadakis	October 3	Detroit Pistons	AEK Athens	
Zendon Hamilton	October 3	Cleveland Cavaliers	Milwaukee Bucks	
Randy Holcomb	October 3	Chicago Bulls	Gary Steelheads	
Ryan Humphrey	October 3	Minnesota Timberwolves	Memphis Grizzlies	
Jason Kapono	October 3	Miami Heat	Charlotte Bobcats	
Hervé Lamizana	October 3	Philadelphia 76ers	Hapoel Galil Elyon	
Lee Seung-jun	October 3	Sacramento Kings	Bellingham Slam	

== Draft ==
=== 1st Round ===
Pick	Player	Date signed	Team	School/club team	Ref
1	Andrew Bogut	July 1	Milwaukee Bucks	Utah (So.)	
2	Marvin Williams	July 12	Atlanta Hawks	North Carolina (Fr.)	
3	Deron Williams	July 11	Utah Jazz	Illinois (Jr.)	
4	Chris Paul	July 5	New Orleans/Oklahoma City Hornets	Wake Forest (So.)	
5	Raymond Felton	July 7	Charlotte Bobcats	North Carolina (Jr.)	
6	Martell Webster	July 2	Portland Trail Blazers	Seattle Prep School (Seattle)	
7	Charlie Villanueva	July 5	Toronto Raptors	Connecticut (So.)	
8	Channing Frye	July 2	New York Knicks	Arizona (Sr.)	
9	Ike Diogu	July 6	Golden State Warriors	Arizona State (Jr.)	
10	Andrew Bynum	July 6	Los Angeles Lakers	St. Joseph HS (Metuchen, New Jersey)	
11	Fran Vázquez		Orlando Magic	Unicaja Málaga (Spain)	
12	Yaroslav Korolev	September 15	Los Angeles Clippers	CSKA Moscow (Russia)	
13	Sean May	July 7	Charlotte Bobcats	North Carolina (Jr.)	
14	Rashad McCants	July 8	Minnesota Timberwolves	North Carolina (Jr.)	
15	Antoine Wright	July 22	New Jersey Nets	Texas A&M (Jr.)	
16	Joey Graham	July 5	Toronto Raptors	Oklahoma State (Sr.)	
17	Danny Granger	July 7	Indiana Pacers	New Mexico (Sr.)	
18	Gerald Green	July 3	Boston Celtics	Gulf Shores Academy (Houston)	
19	Hakim Warrick	July 8	Memphis Grizzlies	Syracuse (Sr.)	
20	Julius Hodge	July 5	Denver Nuggets	NC State (Sr.)	
21	Nate Robinson	July 1	New York Knicks	Washington (Jr.)	
22	Jarrett Jack	July 13	Portland Trail Blazers	Georgia Tech (Jr.)	
23	Francisco García	July 6	Sacramento Kings	Louisville (Jr.)	
24	Luther Head	July 1	Houston Rockets	Illinois (Sr.)	
25	Johan Petro	July 11	Seattle SuperSonics	Pau-Orthez (France)	
26	Jason Maxiell	July 5	Detroit Pistons	Cincinnati (Sr.)	
27	Linas Kleiza	July 5	Denver Nuggets	Missouri (So.)	
28	Ian Mahinmi		San Antonio Spurs	Le Harve (France)	
29	Wayne Simien	August 12	Miami Heat	Kansas (Sr.)	
30	David Lee	July 1	New York Knicks	Florida (Sr.)	

=== 2nd round ===
Pick	Player	Date signed	Team	School/club team	Ref
31	Salim Stoudamire	August 26	Atlanta Hawks	Arizona (Sr.)	
32	Daniel Ewing	August 23	Los Angeles Clippers	Duke (Sr.)	
33	Brandon Bass	August 24	New Orleans/Oklahoma City Hornets	LSU (So.)	
34	C. J. Miles	July 11	Utah Jazz	Skyline HS (Dallas)	
35	Ricky Sánchez		Denver Nuggets	IMG Academy (Bradenton, Florida)	
36	Ersan İlyasova	August 22	Milwaukee Bucks	Ülkerspor (Turkey)	
37	Ronny Turiaf	July 13	Los Angeles Lakers	Gonzaga (Sr.)	
38	Travis Diener	August 16	Orlando Magic	Marquette (Sr.)	
39	Von Wafer	August 1	Los Angeles Lakers	Florida State (So.)	
40	Monta Ellis	August 5	Golden State Warriors	Lanier HS (Jackson, Mississippi)	
41	Roko Ukić		Toronto Raptors	KK Split (Croatia)	
42	Chris Taft	August 4	Golden State Warriors	Pittsburgh (So.)	
43	Mile Ilić		New Jersey Nets	KK Reflex (Serbia and Montenegro)	
44	Martynas Andriuškevičius	August 11	Cleveland Cavaliers	Žalgiris (Lithuania)	
45	Louis Williams	August 18	Philadelphia 76ers	South Gwinnett (Snellville, Georgia)	
46	Erazem Lorbek		Indiana Pacers	Climamio Bologna (Italy)	
47	Bracey Wright	September 12	Minnesota Timberwolves	Indiana (Jr.)	
48	Mickaël Gelabale		Seattle SuperSonics	Real Madrid (Spain)	
49	Andray Blatche	August 3	Washington Wizards	South Kent School (South Kent, Connecticut)	
50	Ryan Gomes	August 16	Boston Celtics	Providence (Sr.)	
51	Robert Whaley	September 1	Utah Jazz	Walsh (Sr.)	
52	Axel Hervelle		Denver Nuggets	Real Madrid (Spain)	
53	Orien Greene	September 12	Boston Celtics	Louisiana-Lafayette (Sr.)	
54	Dijon Thompson	July 11	Phoenix Suns	UCLA (Sr.)	
55	Lawrence Roberts	July 9	Memphis Grizzlies	Miss State (Sr.)	
56	Amir Johnson	August 9	Detroit Pistons	Westchester HS (Los Angeles)	
57	Marcin Gortat		Orlando Magic	RheinEnergie Köln (Germany)	
58	Uroš Slokar		Toronto Raptors	Snaidero Udine (Italy)	
59	Cenk Akyol		Atlanta Hawks	Efes Pilsen (Turkey)	
60	Alex Acker	August 11	Detroit Pistons	Pepperdine (Jr.)	

=== Signed Undrafted Players ===
Date	Player	Team	School/Club Team
August 2	Ronnie Price	Sacramento Kings	Utah Valley (Sr.)
August 4	Donell Taylor	Washington Wizards	UAB (Sr.)
August 5	Alan Anderson	Charlotte Bobcats	Michigan State (Sr.)
August 5	Deng Gai	Philadelphia 76ers	Fairfield (Sr.)
August 5	Rawle Marshall	Dallas Mavericks	Oakland (Sr.)
August 5	Shavlik Randolph	Philadelphia 76ers	Duke (Jr.)
August 8	Eddie Basden	Chicago Bulls	Charlotte (Sr.)
August 11	Matt Walsh	Miami Heat	Florida (Jr.)
August 15	Luke Schenscher	Denver Nuggets	Georgia Tech (Sr.)
August 17	Anthony Roberson	Memphis Grizzlies	Florida (Jr.)
August 19	Will Bynum	Boston Celtics	Georgia Tech (Sr.)
August 22	Dwayne Jones	Minnesota Timberwolves	Saint Joseph's (Jr.)
August 30	Spencer Nelson	Utah Jazz	Utah State (Sr.)
September 2	Stephen Graham	San Antonio Spurs	Oklahoma State (Sr.)
September 2	Devin Green	Los Angeles Lakers	Hampton (Sr.)
September 12	Esteban Batista	Atlanta Hawks	Aguas de Calpe
September 13	Jawad Williams	San Antonio Spurs	North Carolina (Sr.)
September 13	Sharrod Ford	San Antonio Spurs	Clemson (Sr.)
September 16	Will Conroy	Los Angeles Lakers	Washington (Sr.)
September 17	Marcus Campbell	Charlotte Bobcats	Miss State (Sr.)
September 17	D'or Fischer	Charlotte Bobcats	West Virginia (Sr.)
September 17	Matt Nelson	Charlotte Bobcats	Colorado State (Sr.)
September 27	Deji Akindele	Golden State Warriors	Chicago State (So.)
September 27	Aaron Miles	Golden State Warriors	Kansas (Sr.)
September 28	Kyle Bailey	San Antonio Spurs	Santa Clara (Sr.)
September 28	Kennedy Winston	Memphis Grizzlies	Alabama (Jr.)
September 30	Chuck Hayes	Houston Rockets	Kentucky (Sr.)
September 30	Anthony Pedroza	Phoenix Suns	Oregon (Sr.)
September 30	Andre Owens	Utah Jazz	Houston (Sr.)
October 1	Sean Banks	New Orleans/Oklahoma City Hornets	Memphis (So.)
October 2	Omar Thomas	Seattle SuperSonics	UTEP (Sr.)
October 2	Tre Simmons	Seattle SuperSonics	Washington (Sr.)
October 2	Roger Powell	Seattle SuperSonics	Illinois (Sr.)
October 3	Kelenna Azubuike	Cleveland Cavaliers	Kentucky (Jr.)
October 3	Steve Castleberry	Philadelphia 76ers	Rider (Sr.)
October 3	Olu Famutimi	Philadelphia 76ers	Arkansas (So.)
October 3	Otis George	New York Knicks	Louisville (Sr.)
October 3	Keith Langford	Houston Rockets	Kansas (Sr.)

== Other ==
- Houston Rockets announce Clyde Drexler and Matt Bullard as new television analysts.
- New York Knicks names Roger Hinds athletic trainer.
