= Anwar Ferguson =

Bahamanian basketball player

Personal information
- Born: October 10, 1981 (age 45) Exuma, The Bahamas
- Listed height: 7 ft 0 in (2.13 m)
- Listed weight: 220 lb (100 kg)

Career information
- High school: L.N. Coakley (Exuma, The Bahamas)
- College: Lee College (2000–2002); Houston (2002–2004)
- NBA draft: 2004: undrafted
- Playing career: 2005–2014
- Position: Center
- Number: 33

Career history
- 2005: Arkansas ArchAngels
- 2005: Florida Flame
- 2006: Rome Gladiators
- 2006–2007: Shahrdari Gorgan
- 2007–2008: Energy Invest Rustavi
- 2008–2009: Correcaminos UAT Victoria
- 2010–2011: Sioux Falls Skyforce
- 2011–2012: Correcaminos UAT Victoria
- 2013–2014: Saitama Broncos

Career highlights
- WBA champion (2006); NCAA blocks leader (2004)

Anwar Ferguson (born October 10, 1981) is a Bahamian former professional basketball player.

== Early life and college career ==
Ferguson was born in Exuma, Bahamas, and his father, Clement, is a reverend. He moved the United States during his youth and attended LN Coakley High School in Exuma, from which he graduated in 1999. In basketball, he led the team in rebounds and blocked shots and was named to the conference's all-defensive team. Ferguson then enrolled at Lee College, a community college located in Baytown, Texas. During his freshman season he averaged 1.6 points and 1.4 rebounds per game, but he did record a 10-block game in the playoffs. The next year, Ferguson's sophomore year, he averaged 6.2 points, 6.7 rebounds and 4.8 blocks per game, and his 154 blocks that season set a new school record. In a game against Pensacola State College he recorded a triple-double with 20 points, 14 rebounds and 10 blocks.

After his community college career, Ferguson went on to play at the University of Houston for the Cougars. He played in 28 games and started 14 of them in his junior year while averaging only 2.0 points per game. However, he did record a total of 49 blocks while averaging 1.8 per game, which placed him second in Conference USA in both statistical categories. Ferguson's best collegiate season came when he was a senior in 2003–04. He moved into the starting lineup permanently and averaged a much-improved 7.5 points, 7.4 rebounds and a Division I-leading 4.11 blocks per game. He blocked 111 total shots that season, which topped Conference USA and ranked third nationally. In just two seasons at Houston, Ferguson recorded 160 blocks, which at the time of his graduation ranked him fifth in school history.

== Professional career ==
Ferguson was not selected in the 2004 NBA draft. He did play on several professional and semi-professional basketball summer league teams in 2004, including the Philadelphia 76ers' squad in the Minneapolis league. The closest he came to making an NBA team's final regular season roster was in the fall of 2004, when the Sacramento Kings waived him at the end of October just before the season began.

His first post-college professional playing time occurred in June 2005 when the Arkansas ArchAngels of the World Basketball Association (WBA) signed him for several games. He played in five games and averaged 6.6 points, 7.8 rebounds and 3.8 blocks per game. The following fall he was briefly on the Florida Flame in the NBA Development League before being waived. The WBA's Rome Gladiators signed him in 2006 and it was with them that he won regular season and postseason WBA championships. Another failed stint on the Sacramento Kings' preseason training camp roster prior to the 2006–07 season forced him to look elsewhere. Ferguson signed with Shahrdari Gorgan BC of the Iranian Basketball Super League for the 2006–07 season, followed by one year playing for Energy Invest Rustavi of the Georgian Super Liga in 2007–08. With Rustavi, Ferguson was named to the Eurobasket.com Georgian League All-Imports Team. In 2008–09 he played for Correcaminos UAT Victoria in Mexico's Liga Nacional de Baloncesto Profesional.

Ferguson was unable to play basketball in 2009–10 because he had green card issues that he needed to sort out. Then, in November 2010, the Sioux Falls Skyforce of the NBA Development League signed him.

== Career statistics ==
Legend
GP	Games played	GS	Games started	MPG	Minutes per game
FG%	Field goal percentage	3P%	3-point field goal percentage	FT%	Free throw percentage
RPG	Rebounds per game	APG	Assists per game	SPG	Steals per game
BPG	Blocks per game	PPG	Points per game	**Bold**	Career high

*	Led NCAA Division I

=== College ===
Year	Team	GP	GS	MPG	FG%	3P%	FT%	RPG	APG	SPG	BPG	PPG
2002–03	Houston	**28**	14	15.6	.373	**.000**	**.680**	2.9	**0.2**	.1	1.8	2.0
2003–04	Houston	27	**27**	**29.6**	**.538**	**.000**	.576	**7.4**	**0.2**	**.5**	**4.1***	**7.5**
Career		55	41	22.4	.498	.000	.607	5.1	0.2	.3	2.9	4.7

== See also ==
- List of NCAA Division I men's basketball season blocks leaders
