= Stefhon Hannah =

American basketball player

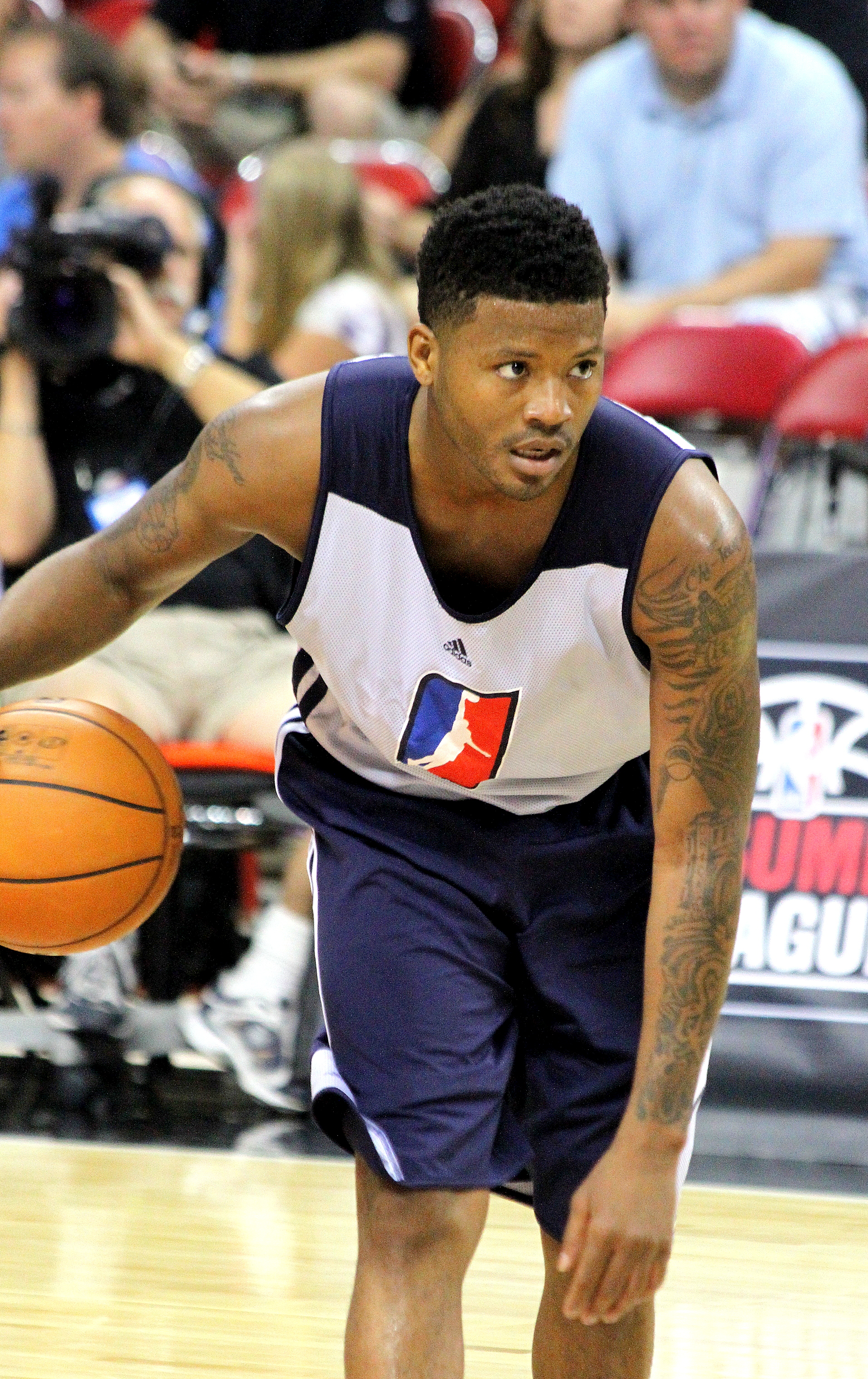
- Hannah with the D-League Select Team in 2013

Personal information
- Born: June 14, 1985 (age 41) Chicago, Illinois, U.S.
- Listed height: 6 ft 1 in (1.85 m)
- Listed weight: 175 lb (79 kg)

Career information
- High school: Hyde Park Career Academy (Chicago, Illinois)
- College: Chipola (2004–2006); Missouri (2006–2008)
- NBA draft: 2008: undrafted
- Playing career: 2008–2018
- Position: Point guard

Career history
- 2008: APOEL
- 2009: Šiauliai
- 2010: Marietta Storm
- 2010–2011: Iowa Energy
- 2011: B-Meg Llamados
- 2011–2012: AZS Koszalin
- 2012: Dakota Wizards
- 2012–2013: Santa Cruz Warriors
- 2013: Marinos de Anzoátegui
- 2013–2014: Juvecaserta Basket
- 2014: Santa Cruz Warriors
- 2014: Guerreros de Bogotá
- 2014–2015: Reno Bighorns
- 2015–2016: Grand Rapids Drive
- 2016: AZS Koszalin
- 2018: Windy City Bulls
- 2018: Delaware 87ers

Career highlights
- NBA D-League champion (2011); 2× NBA D-League DPOY (2012, 2013); All-WBA First Team (2010); LKL All-Star (2009); Third-team All-Big 12 (2007); Big 12 Newcomer of the Year (2007); Big 12 All-Rookie Team (2007)
- Stats at Basketball Reference
Medals
Men's 3x3 basketball
Representing the United States
World Cup
Silver medal – second place	2016 China	Team

Stefhon L. Hannah (born June 14, 1985) is an American former professional basketball player. He played college basketball for Chipola College and Missouri.

== High school career ==
Hannah went to Hyde Park Career Academy where he averaged 23.1 points, 7.8 assists and 4.3 boards, leading the Indians to the Chicago Public League Red-East and Regional championships as a senior while earning first team All-Public League first team All-Area honors and All-State recognition from the Chicago Sun-Times and Chicago Tribune. He also led Hyde Park to the Blue Cross/Blue Shield Holiday Tournament title and was named the tournament's Most Valuable Player.

== College career ==
Hannah began his college career at Chipola CC where he averaged 14.5 points, 6.5 assists, 4.4 rebounds and 3.1 steals as a sophomore to earn first team All-Panhandle Conference honors and Panhandle Player of the Year recognition. He also led the Indians with an incredible 2.1-to-1 assist-to-turnover ratio and ranked among the Top 10 junior college guards nationally by JUCO Junction.com and the No. 25 JUCO player overall by the same service.

After two years at Chipola, Hannah transferred to Missouri where he averaged 15.1 points, 3.3 rebounds, 4,8 assists and 2.2 steals, earning Big 12 Conference Newcomer of the Year by the Big 12 Coaches, Big 12 Media, Associated Press, Kansas City Star and Austin American-Statesman, Big 12 All-Rookie / Newcomer teams by the Big 12 Coaches and Kansas City Star and a Second Team All-Big 12 pick by the Kansas City Star and a Third Team choice by the Big 12 Coaches.

Hannah was involved in a nightclub fracas on January 27, 2008, that left him with a broken jaw. Following the incident, Hannah missed two weeks of classes and was subsequently dismissed from the team for failing to meet academic requirements. Hannah was charged with third-degree misdemeanor assault for his involvement in the nightclub events and eventually pled guilty to peace disturbance by fighting.

== Professional career ==
After going undrafted in the 2008 NBA draft, Hannah signed with APOEL B.C. of Cyprus for the 2008–09 season. In October 2008, he left APOEL after three league games and two EuroChallenge games. In January 2009, he signed with BC Šiauliai of Lithuania for the rest of the season.

In May 2010, Hannah joined the Marietta Storm for the 2010 WBA season. He went on to earn All-WBA first team honors.

On October 30, 2010, Hannah was acquired by the Iowa Energy. However, he was later waived by the Energy on November 17, 2010. On December 17, 2010, he was reacquired by the Energy. In June 2011, he signed with B-Meg Llamados for the 2011 PBA Governors' Cup.

In October 2011, Hannah signed with AZS Koszalin of Poland for the 2011–12 season. In January 2012, he left Koszalin and joined the Dakota Wizards for the rest of the season. He went on to win the NBA Development League Defensive Player of the Year Award.

In July 2012, Hannah joined the Milwaukee Bucks for the 2012 NBA Summer League. On October 1, 2012, he signed with the Golden State Warriors. However, he was later waived by the Warriors on October 13, 2012. In November 2012, he was acquired by the Santa Cruz Warriors. He went on to win the D-League's Defensive Player of the Year Award for the second straight year. In May 2013, Hannah joined Marinos de Anzoátegui of the Liga Profesional de Baloncesto.

In July 2013, Hannah joined the NBA D-League Select Team for the 2013 NBA Summer League. On August 4, 2013, he signed with Juvecaserta Basket of Italy for the 2013–14 season. In February 2014, he parted ways with Juvecaserta. On April 3, 2014, he was reacquired by the Santa Cruz Warriors.

On September 3, 2014, Hannah was acquired by the Westchester Knicks in the NBA D-League expansion draft. Later that month, he joined Guerreros de Bogotá of the Baloncesto Profesional Colombiano. After nine games, he returned to the United States. On October 31, 2014, Hannah's rights were traded by Westchester to the Reno Bighorns, along with a first-round pick, in exchange for Darnell Jackson. He officially joined the Bighorns on November 2, 2014. On January 28, 2015, after being waived by Reno, Hannah was acquired by the Grand Rapids Drive.

On October 1, 2015, Hannah signed with the Chicago Bulls. However, he was later waived by the Bulls on October 13 after appearing in one preseason game. On October 31, he returned to the Grand Rapids Drive. On January 1, 2016, he was waived by the Drive. On January 24, he signed with AZS Koszalin, returning to the club for a second stint.
