= Sports in Georgia (U.S. state) =

Sports in Georgia include professional teams, Olympic Games contenders and medalists, collegiate teams in major and small-school conferences and associations, and active amateur teams and individual sports.

== Professional sports ==
=== Baseball ===
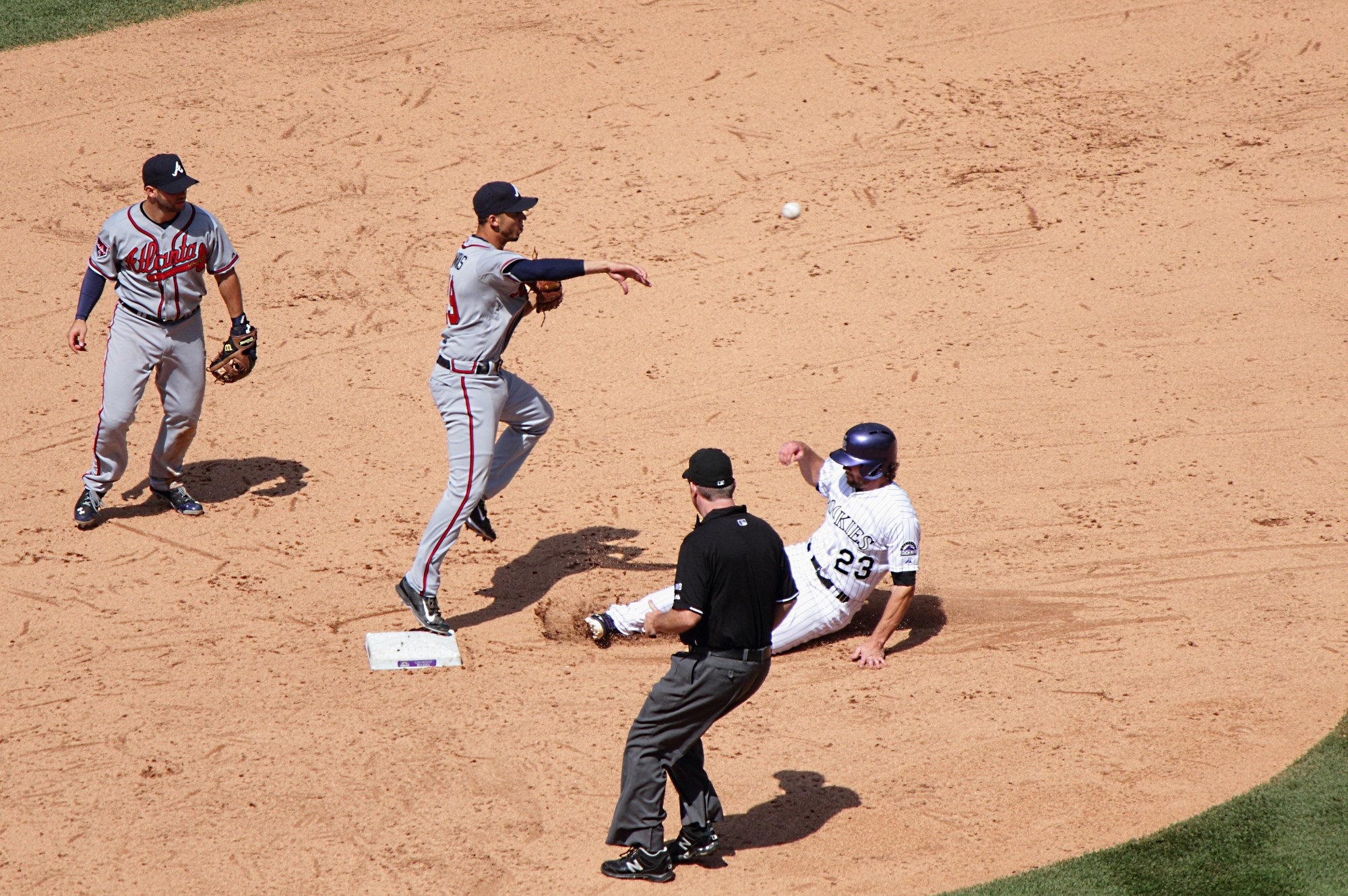
The Atlanta Braves in 2014

The Atlanta Braves are a Major League Baseball (MLB) team that moved to Atlanta in 1966 from Milwaukee where they were known as the Milwaukee Braves. The Braves play their home games at Truist Park in suburban Cobb County, which opened in 2017 as the replacement for Turner Field, which had been the team's home since the 1997 season. Before then, they played at Atlanta–Fulton County Stadium from 1966 to 1996. They won the World Series in 1914 (as the Boston Braves), 1957 (as the Milwaukee Braves), and 1995, 2021 (as the Atlanta Braves). Braves players in the Baseball Hall of Fame include Hank Aaron, Orlando Cepeda, Tom Glavine, Chipper Jones, Greg Maddux, Eddie Mathews, Fred McGriff, Phil Niekro, Gaylord Perry, John Smoltz, Warren Spahn, Bruce Sutter, and Hoyt Wilhelm. Two former Braves managers have been inducted to the Hall in that role, Bobby Cox and Joe Torre, although Torre's induction was mainly for his accomplishments with the New York Yankees. Mathews also served as a Braves manager. Braves executive John Schuerholz entered the Hall in July 2017 for his accomplishments in that role.

The AAA minor league baseball Gwinnett Stripers of the International League began play at Coolray Field in 2009. The Atlanta Crackers were the AAA affiliate of the Braves organization before the Braves moved to Atlanta.

The Rome Emperors, previously known as the Macon Braves and the Rome Braves, are a High-A minor league affiliate of the Atlanta Braves playing in the South Atlantic League. In 2003, the team moved from Macon to Rome. Their home games are played at State Mutual Stadium, which opened April 11, 2003. Former Atlanta Braves alumni include Brian McCann, who was a Rome Brave in 2003. After the 2023 season the team changed its name from Braves to Emperors. The Augusta GreenJackets play in the Carolina League. They were previously affiliated with the San Francisco Giants from 2005 to 2020; however, since 2021, they have become the Single-A affiliate of the Atlanta Braves. In 2018, the GreenJackets moved from their namesake of Augusta into a new ballpark across the Savannah River to SRP Park, in North Augusta, South Carolina. The Savannah Sand Gnats played in the same league from 1984 to 2015, most recently as affiliates of the New York Mets (2007–2015), but have since relocated to Columbia, South Carolina as the Columbia Fireflies. All three teams were formerly members of the South Atlantic League.

After the relocation of the Sand Gnats, Savannah's Grayson Stadium became the home of the Savannah Bananas of the Coastal Plain League, a wood-bat collegiate summer league, In 2020, the Bananas gained nationwide attention for an unorthodox style of play dubbed Banana Ball, starting a professional exhibition team that plays under that rule set. After the 2022 season, the Bananas shut down their collegiate summer team to focus entirely on their professional exhibition operation.

=== Basketball ===
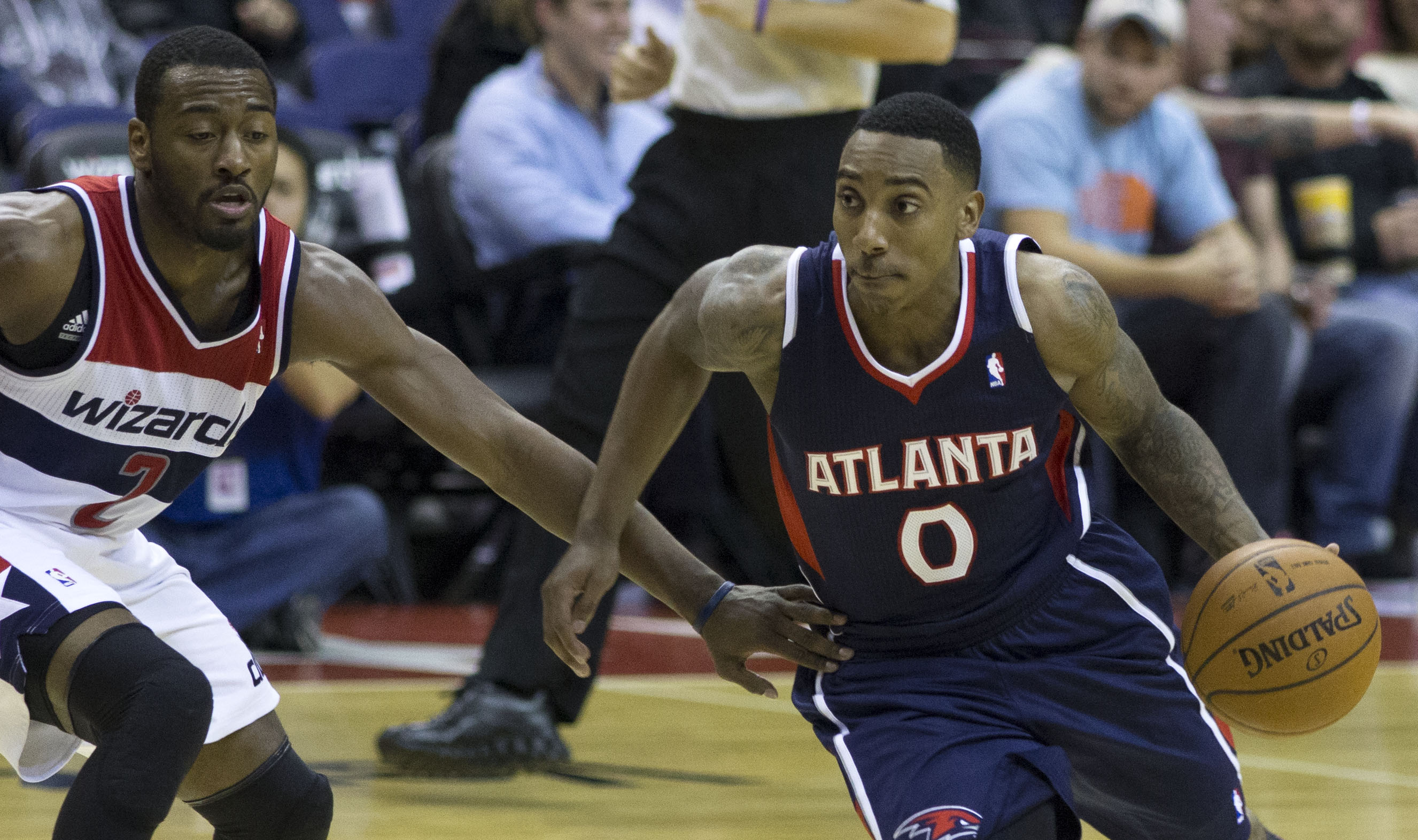
Hawks' Jeff Teague in 2013

The Atlanta Hawks are a National Basketball Association (NBA) team founded in 1949 and play their home games at State Farm Arena; (previously Philips Arena from 1999 to 2018.) Alexander Memorial Coliseum (now Hank McCamish Pavilion) from 1968 to 1972, the Omni Coliseum from 1972 to 1997, and the Georgia Dome from 1997 to 1999. The Hawks have won one Championship, four Conference titles and fourteen Division titles. Notable current and former Hawks include Walt Bellamy, Cliff Hagan, Connie Hawkins, Bob Houbregs, Moses Malone, Pete Maravich, Ed Macauley, Bob Pettit, Lenny Wilkens, Dominique Wilkins, and Trae Young.

The Atlanta Dream has played in the Women's National Basketball Association since 2008. They play their home games at Gateway Center Arena.

The American Basketball Association and the World Basketball Association are also represented in Georgia. In the case of the former, Georgia has three teams: the Atlanta Vision, the Rome Legions, and the Georgia Gwizzlies. The latter association teams are the Georgia Warriors, the Marietta Storm and the Rome Gladiators.

=== Football ===
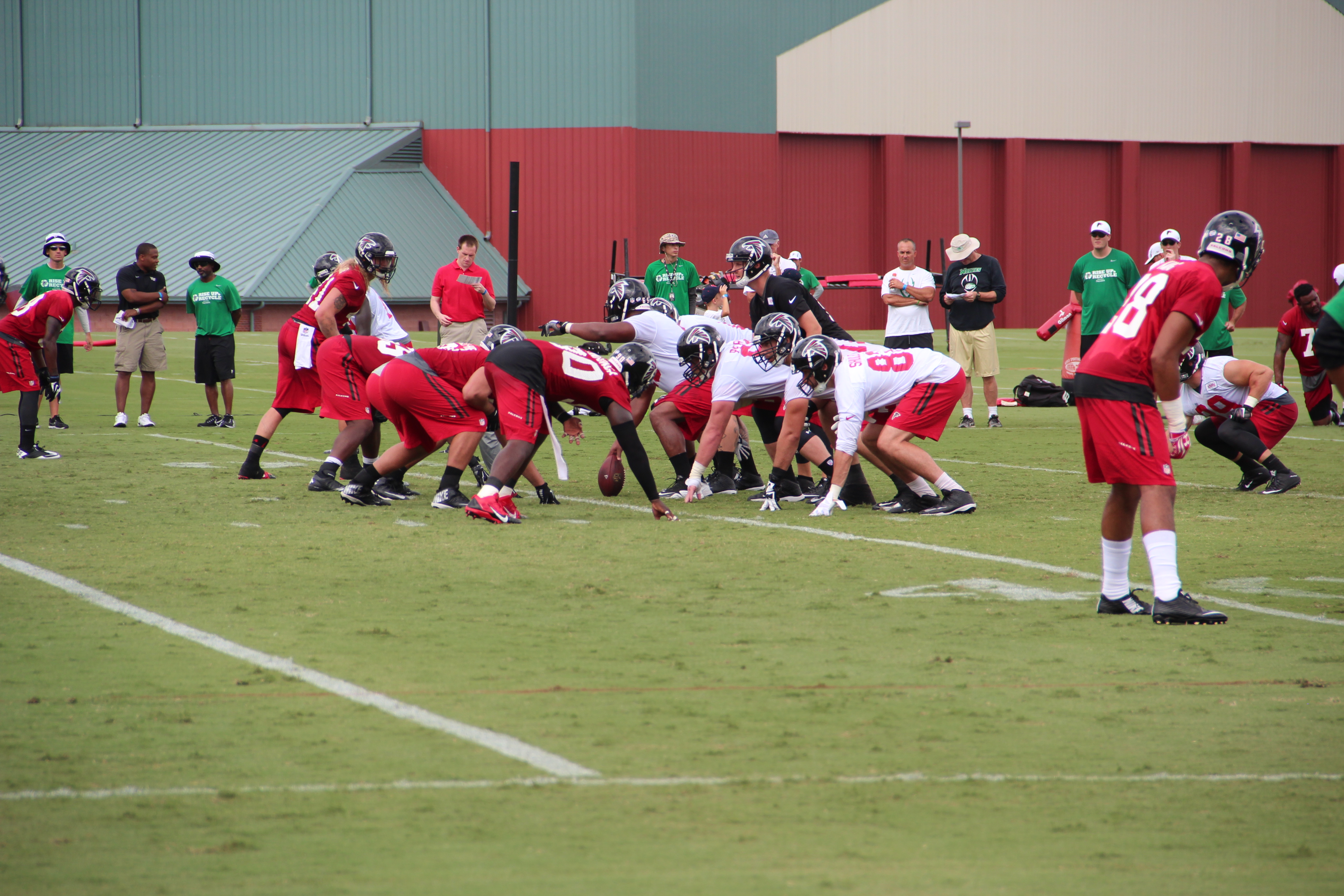
Atlanta Falcons players at training camp

The Atlanta Falcons are a National Football League (NFL) team founded as an expansion team in 1966. They have played their home games at Mercedes-Benz Stadium in Atlanta since 2017; they previously played at the Georgia Dome; prior to playing at the Georgia Dome, they played at Atlanta-Fulton County Stadium from 1966 to 1991. The Falcons have won seven Division Championships in 1980, 1982, 1998, 2004, 2010, 2012 and 2016 and two Conference Championships in 1998 and 2016. Notable current and former players include Matt Ryan, Julio Jones, Eric Dickerson, Tommy McDonald, William Andrews, Jeff Van Note, Michael Vick, Jessie Tuggle, Mike Kenn, Marion Campbell, Dan Reeves, Greg Brezina, Ray Buchanan, Buddy Curry, T. J. Duckett, Bill Fralic and Wallace Francis.

The Atlanta Legends played in the Alliance of American Football in 2019, with home games at the Georgia State Stadium.

Georgia has also been home to several arena and indoor football teams. Two different teams known as the Georgia Force played in the Arena Football League (AFL). The original version arrived in Georgia after the 2001 season, having relocated from Nashville, Tennessee. This team initially played at Philips Arena, but later moved its home games to the suburb of Duluth. This version of the Force folded along with the league after the 2008 season. The AFL was relaunched in 2010, and a new version of the Force arrived in 2011 when the Alabama Vipers relocated from Huntsville. The new Force played the 2011 and 2012 seasons before folding. Georgia has also had various minor league indoor teams in the United Arena League (UAL) af2, National Indoor Football League (NIFL), Southern Indoor Football League (SIFL), American Indoor Football (AIF), World Indoor Football League (WIFL), American Arena League (AAL), and the National Arena League (NAL), with the Columbus Lions having lasted since 2007 and playing in over five different leagues.

Cumming, Georgia is home to an Arena football team, Peach State Cats, in the United Arena League (UAL).

The Atlanta Xplosion are a Women's Professional Football League team. They won the league's 2006 Championship.

=== Hockey ===
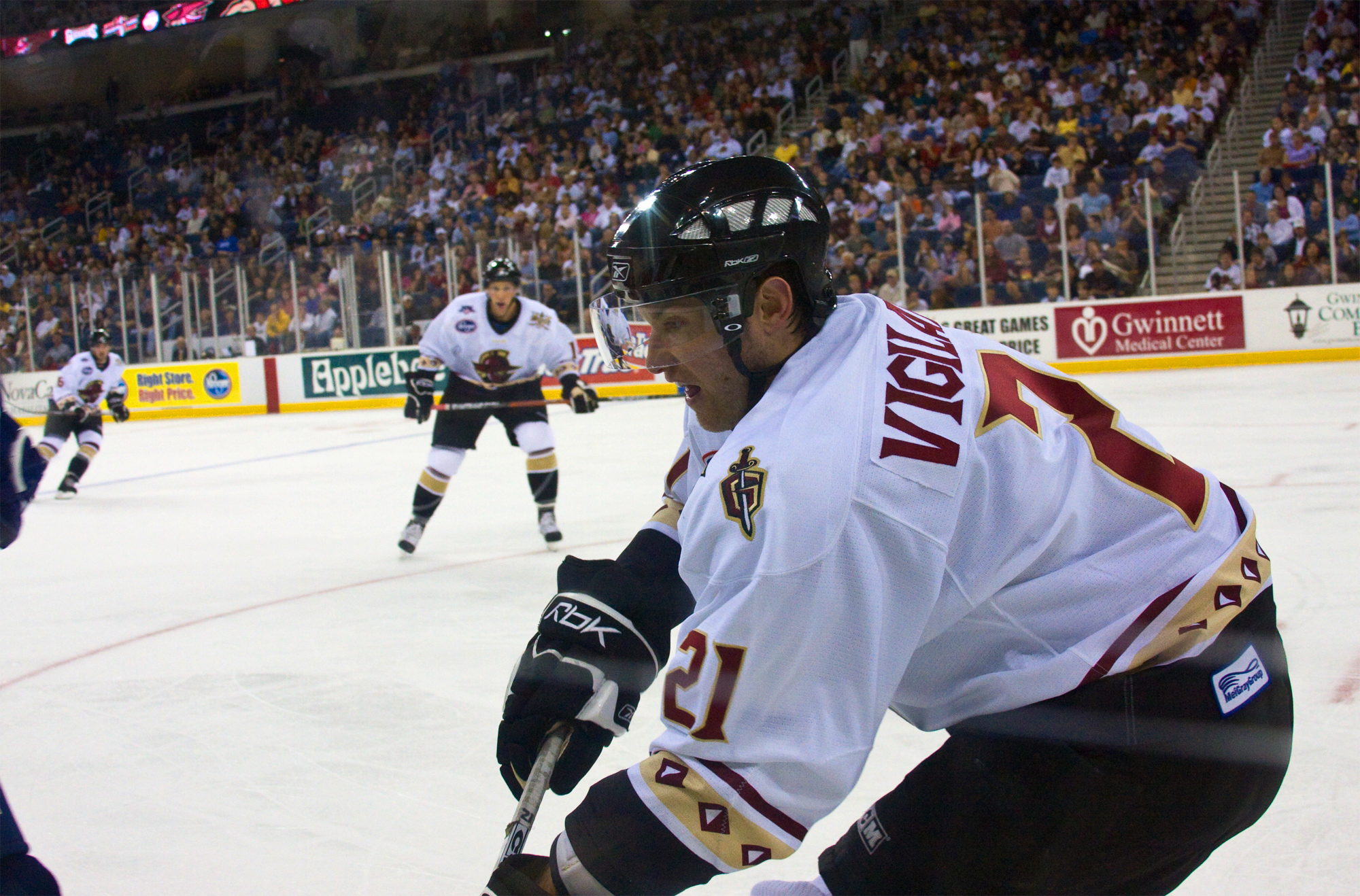
Gwinnett Gladiators playing at Infinite Energy Arena

Hockey's history in Georgia goes back to the 1970s with the Atlanta Flames, who played in the state until 1980 when they were relocated to Calgary. It was not until October 2, 1999 that hockey formally returned with the Atlanta Thrashers' first game against the New Jersey Devils. On May 31, 2011 the Thrashers were sold to True North Sports and Entertainment. It was announced the team would move to the MTS Centre in Winnipeg and return the Winnipeg Jets name to the NHL, resurrecting the name of the city's previous NHL team that departed for Phoenix in 1996. The Thrashers played their home games at the Philips Arena in Atlanta. The Thrashers did not appear in the Stanley Cup Final. They only won one division title during the 2006–07 NHL season and were swept in the first round by the New York Rangers.

Currently, the ECHL has only one operating team in Georgia. The Atlanta Gladiators play all of their homes games at Gas South Arena in Duluth. The team, formerly the Mobile Mysticks, moved to Gwinnett County and officially started play in 2003 as the Gwinnett Gladiators; the team changed their name to Atlanta Gladiators in 2015. The Augusta Lynx were first formed in 1998, but due to financial concerns were forced to cease operations halfway through the 2008 season. The Lynx played their home games at James Brown Arena. In 2021, a new ECHL franchise was awarded to Savannah, the Savannah Ghost Pirates, and the team plays in Enmarket Arena.

The Macon Mayhem is currently the only team in Georgia that is part of the Southern Professional Hockey League. The Mayhem were founded in 2015 after the Augusta RiverHawks suspended operations for the 2013–14 season because of a failure of their home arena's ice system and subsequently relocated to Macon, Georgia, after going dormant for two seasons.

The Columbus Cottonmouths were a hockey team that played for 21 seasons over three separate leagues. The team was founded in 1996 as a member of the Central Hockey League. In 2001, the organization obtained a franchise in the East Coast Hockey League (later called just ECHL) before joining the Southern Professional Hockey League as one of its inaugural members. The organization suspended operations in 2017 when the owners could no longer fund the team and failed to find new owners. Columbus got another professional hockey team in 2019 as the Columbus River Dragons with different owners.

=== Soccer ===
The Atlanta Silverbacks were a North American Soccer League team founded in 1999. The Silverbacks played at the Atlanta Silverbacks Park. The also had a women's team called Atlanta Silverbacks Women that played in the W-League. Both teams ceased operations after the 2015 season, the men's team due to a lack of ownership and the women's team due to the W-League ceasing operations.

Augusta FireBall United, also known as Augusta FireBall, was an American soccer team that was founded in 2005. The team was a member of the Premier Development League (PDL), the fourth tier of the American Soccer Pyramid, until 2006, when the team left the league and the franchise was terminated. They played their home games at Patriots Park in Augusta, Georgia.

The Atlanta Beat was an American professional soccer club based in Atlanta, Georgia. The team joined Women's Professional Soccer (WPS) as an expansion team in 2010, and played its home games at Kennesaw State University Soccer Stadium (now Fifth Third Bank Stadium), the result of a public-private partnership between the team and Kennesaw State University. The club succeeded the former Atlanta Beat of the defunct Women's United Soccer Association. The Beat folded along with WPS after the 2012 season, and the Atlanta area does not have a team in WPS' effective successor, the current National Women's Soccer League.

Atlanta was awarded a Major League Soccer expansion team in April 2014. Atlanta United FC began play in the league in 2017. Atlanta United won the MLS Cup on December 8, 2018.

South Georgia Tormenta FC is based out of Statesboro, Georgia, and began play in 2016 in the amateur Premier Development League. The team moved up to the professional ranks as the first team to join the third tier USL League One, which began play in 2019. The team currently plays at Tormenta FC Stadium and has finished the first phase of soccer-specific stadium, which opened in 2022, the same year Tormenta wins the USL League One Final.

Atlanta will receive a Atlanta City FC in 2028.

=== Golf ===
The Masters Tournament, played in Augusta at Augusta National Golf Club in April is one of four major golf tournaments played in the United States. The tournament was created in 1931 by Bobby Jones and Clifford Roberts, a financier from New York City. The course was designed by golf course architect Alister MacKenzie. Notable golfers from Georgia include Atlanta native Jones, noted as the greatest amateur golfer ever, Davis Love III of Sea Island and Tommy Aaron of Gainesville.

=== Rugby ===
Georgia has professional Rugby league and Rugby union clubs based in Atlanta. The Atlanta Rhinos joined the North American Rugby League for its inaugural season in 2022. They previously played semi-professionally in the USA Rugby League, winning 1 championship in 2017. Rugby ATL were founded in 2018 and began play in Major League Rugby in 2020.

=== Table of professional teams ===
Club	Sport	League
Atlanta Blaze	Lacrosse	Major League Lacrosse
Atlanta Braves	Baseball	Major League Baseball
Atlanta Dream	Basketball	Women's National Basketball Association
Atlanta Falcons	Football	National Football League
Atlanta FaZe	Esports	Call of Duty League
Atlanta Hawks	Basketball	National Basketball Association
Atlanta Gladiators (Duluth)	Ice hockey	ECHL
Atlanta United	Soccer	Major League Soccer
Atlanta Xplosion	Football	Independent Women's Football League
Augusta GreenJackets	Baseball	Carolina League
Columbus Lions	Indoor football	National Arena League
College Park Skyhawks	Basketball	NBA G League
Columbus River Dragons	Ice hockey	Federal Prospects Hockey League
Georgia Swarm	Lacrosse	National Lacrosse League
Gwinnett Stripers	Baseball	International League
Macon Mayhem	Ice hockey	Southern Professional Hockey League
Atlanta Reign	Esports	Overwatch League
Rome Braves	Baseball	South Atlantic League
Atlanta Rhinos	Rugby league	North American Rugby League
Savannah Ghost Pirates	Ice Hockey	ECHL
Rugby ATL	Rugby union	Major League Rugby
South Georgia Tormenta FC	Soccer	USL League One
Savannah Bananas	Baseball	Exhibition team

== Motorsports ==
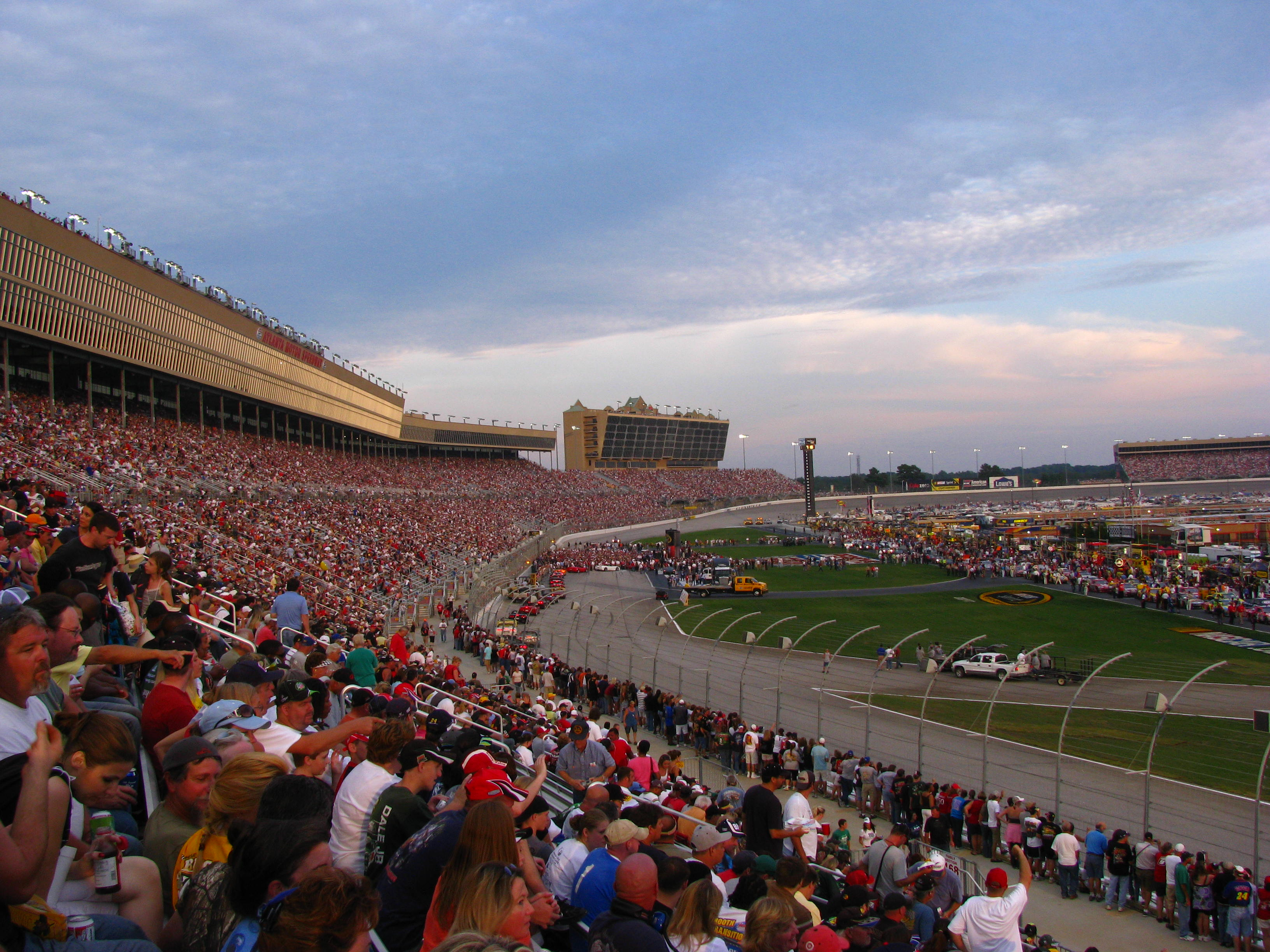
Atlanta Motor Speedway

Georgia is home to approximately twenty-two race tracks and drag strips. Some of the twenty-two tracks in Georgia are the Atlanta Motor Speedway, Road Atlanta (where the Petit Le Mans is held), Atlanta Dragway, Dixie Speedway and Roebling Road Raceway. One of the most famous racers to come from Georgia is Bill Elliott.

=== NASCAR ===
Many observers consider Dawsonville one of the birthplaces of NASCAR because so many individuals involved in the sport were from that city. Notable racers from Dawsonville include Bill Elliott, Chase Elliott, Roy Hall and Lloyd Seay. Since 1951 Georgia tracks have hosted two to eight races in NASCAR's elite division. Dawsonville is home to the Georgia Racing Hall of Fame.

== College ==
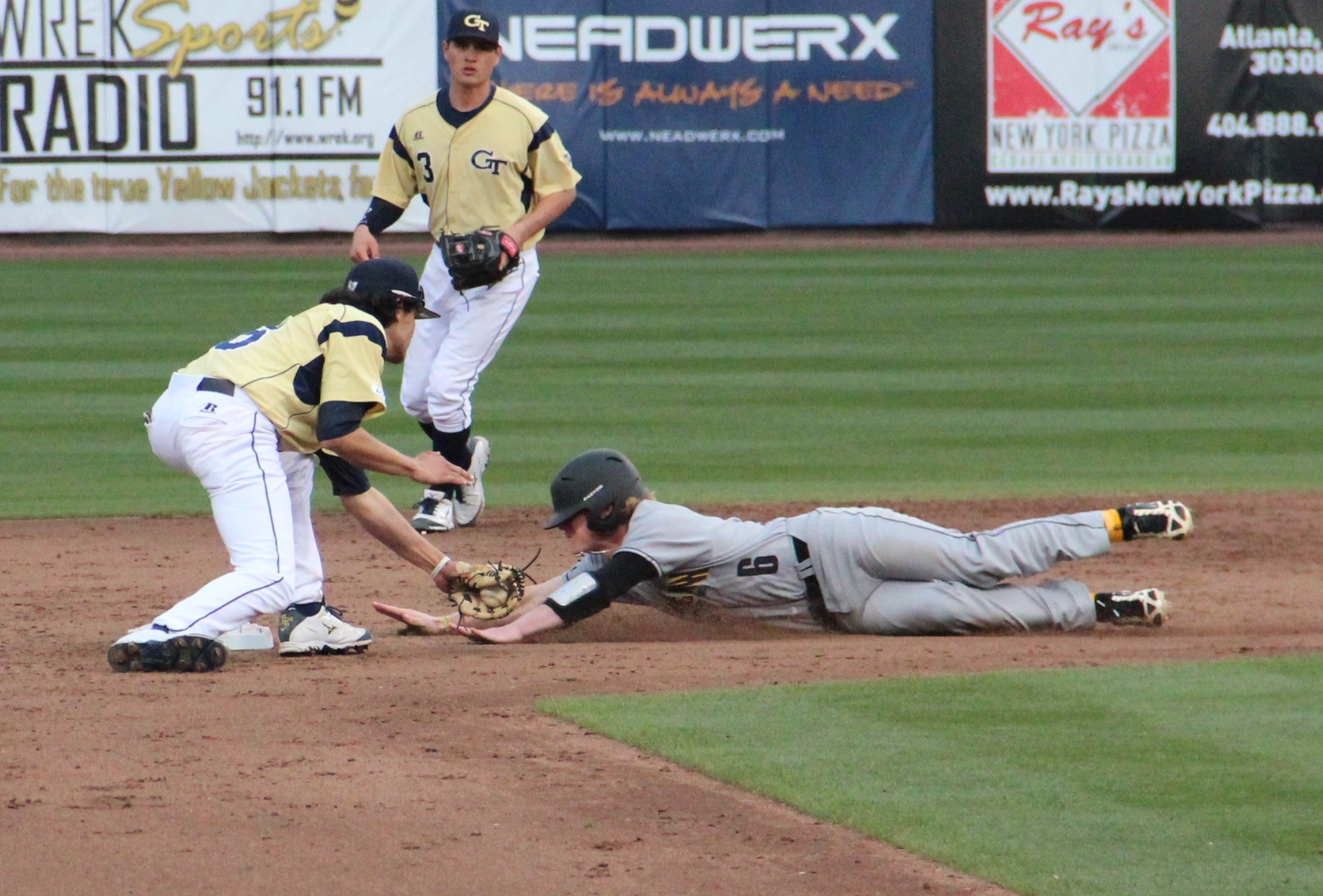
Russ Chandler Stadium during a baseball game between Georgia Tech and Kennesaw State

The state of Georgia has 29 schools competing in the National Collegiate Athletic Association (NCAA) and 13 schools in the NAIA.

=== Division I ===
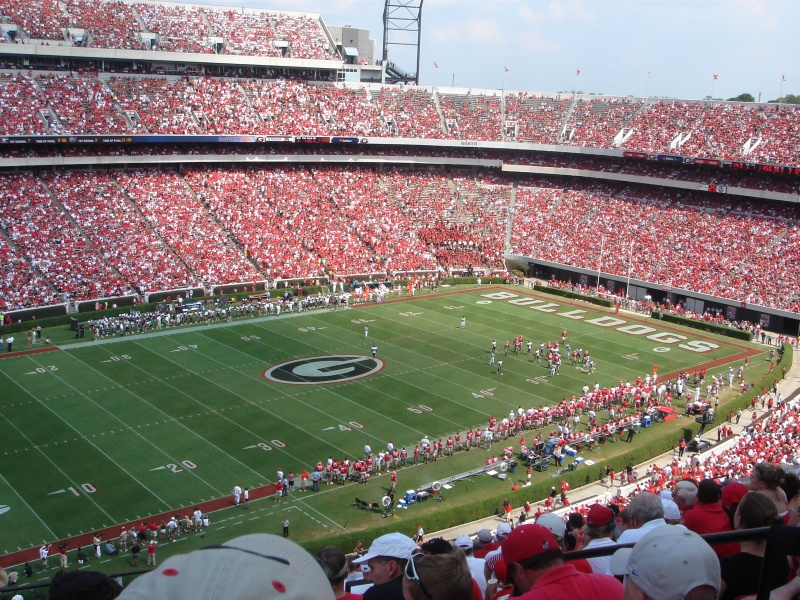
Sanford Stadium

Seven Division I institutions are recognized by the NCAA.

Five field football teams in the top level of college football, Division I FBS:

- University of Georgia
- Georgia Southern University
- Georgia State University
- Georgia Institute of Technology (Georgia Tech)
- Kennesaw State University, which started a transition to FBS in the 2023–24 school year and becomes a full FBS member in 2025.

The Georgia Bulldogs and the Georgia Tech Yellow Jackets have a historical rivalry in college football known as Clean, Old-Fashioned Hate. Georgia Southern and Georgia State have a more recent rivalry in multiple sports known as Modern Day Hate.

The remaining two field football teams in the second-tier Division I FCS.

- Mercer University
- The University of West Georgia, which started a transition from Division II in the 2024–25 school year and becomes a full D-I member in 2028.

=== Division II ===
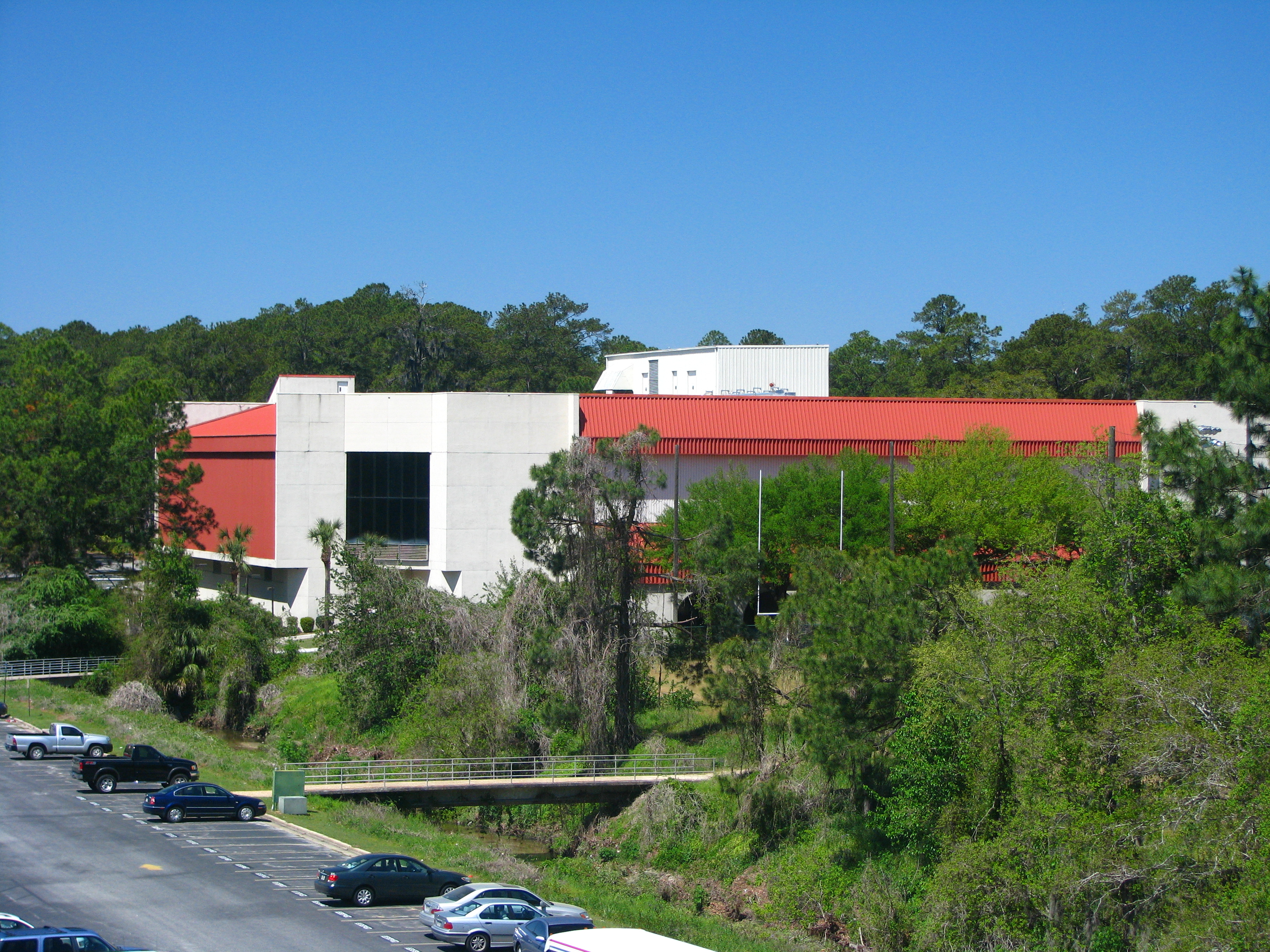
The Complex at Valdosta State University

A total of 15 institutions are members of NCAA Division II.

- Albany State University
- Augusta University
- Clark Atlanta University
- Clayton State University
- Columbus State University
- Emmanuel University
- Fort Valley State University
- Georgia College and State University
- Georgia Southwestern State University
- Morehouse College
- University of North Georgia
- Savannah State University
- Valdosta State University
- Young Harris College

=== Division III ===
LaGrange College is in the NCAA Division III with 14 sports, and competes as a member of the Collegiate Conference of the South. The school's most successful athletic program is its men's golf team, which is perennially among the nation's best.

Georgia has seven other institutions in Division III. They are:

- Agnes Scott College
- Berry College
- Emory University
- LaGrange College
- Oglethorpe University
- Piedmont University
- Spelman College
- Wesleyan College

=== NAIA ===
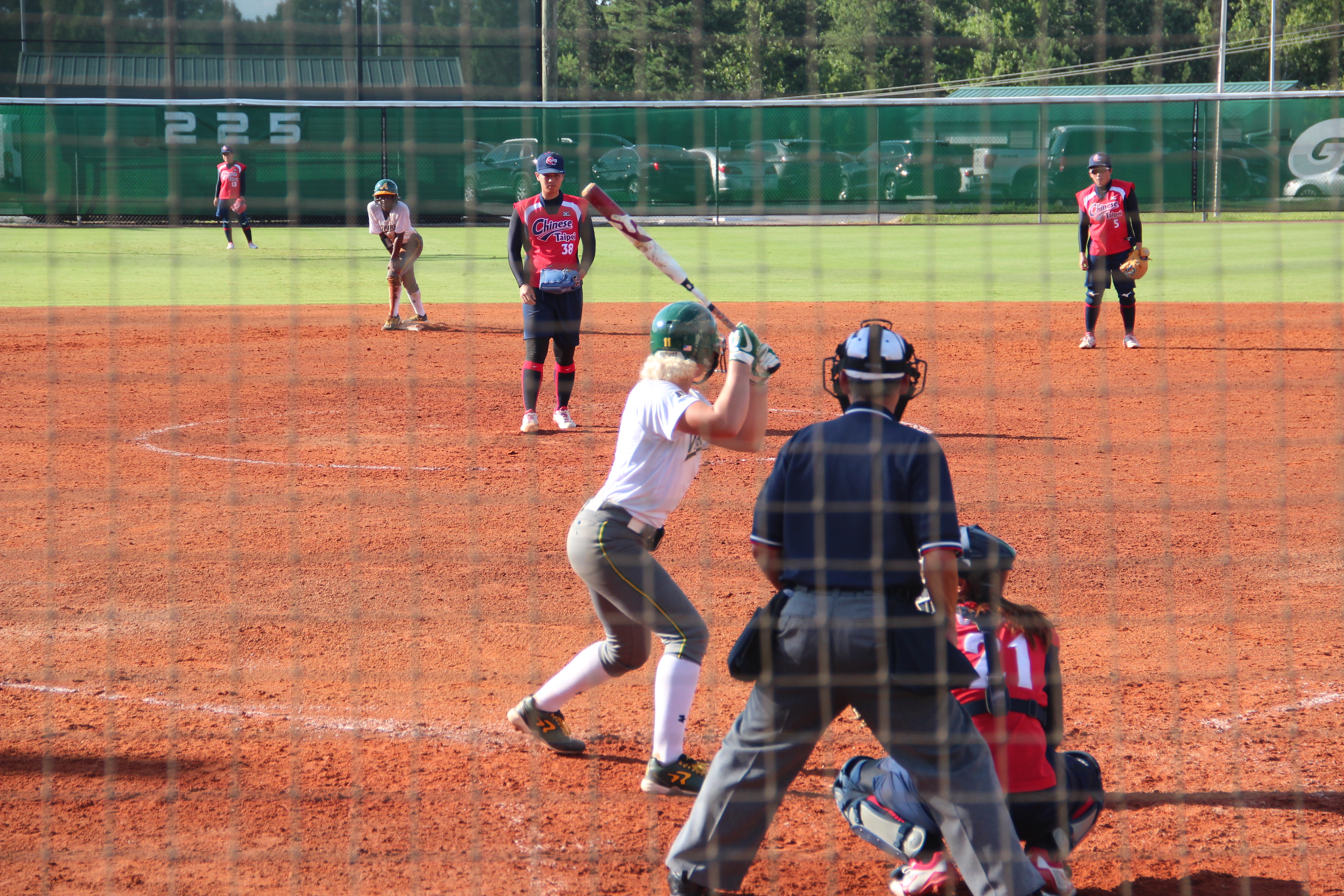
Inside the Grizzly Softball Complex at Georgia Gwinnett College

- Brenau University
- Brewton-Parker College
- College of Coastal Georgia
- Dalton State College
- Georgia Gwinnett College
- Life University
- Middle Georgia State University – Moves to NCAA Division II in July 2025.
- Point University
- Reinhardt University
- Savannah College of Art and Design
- SCAD Atlanta
- Thomas University
- Truett McConnell University

== 1996 Summer Olympics ==
Atlanta was the site of the 1996 Summer Olympics and the 1996 Summer Paralympics. The Olympics were held from July 19 until August 4, 1996. It was during this time, on July 27, 1996, that a bombing took place in Centennial Park killing two and injuring 111 people. The Paralympics were held from August 15 to August 29, 2006.

== 2026 FIFA World Cup ==
Atlanta served as one of eleven US host cities for the 2026 FIFA World Cup.

== Olympians from Georgia ==
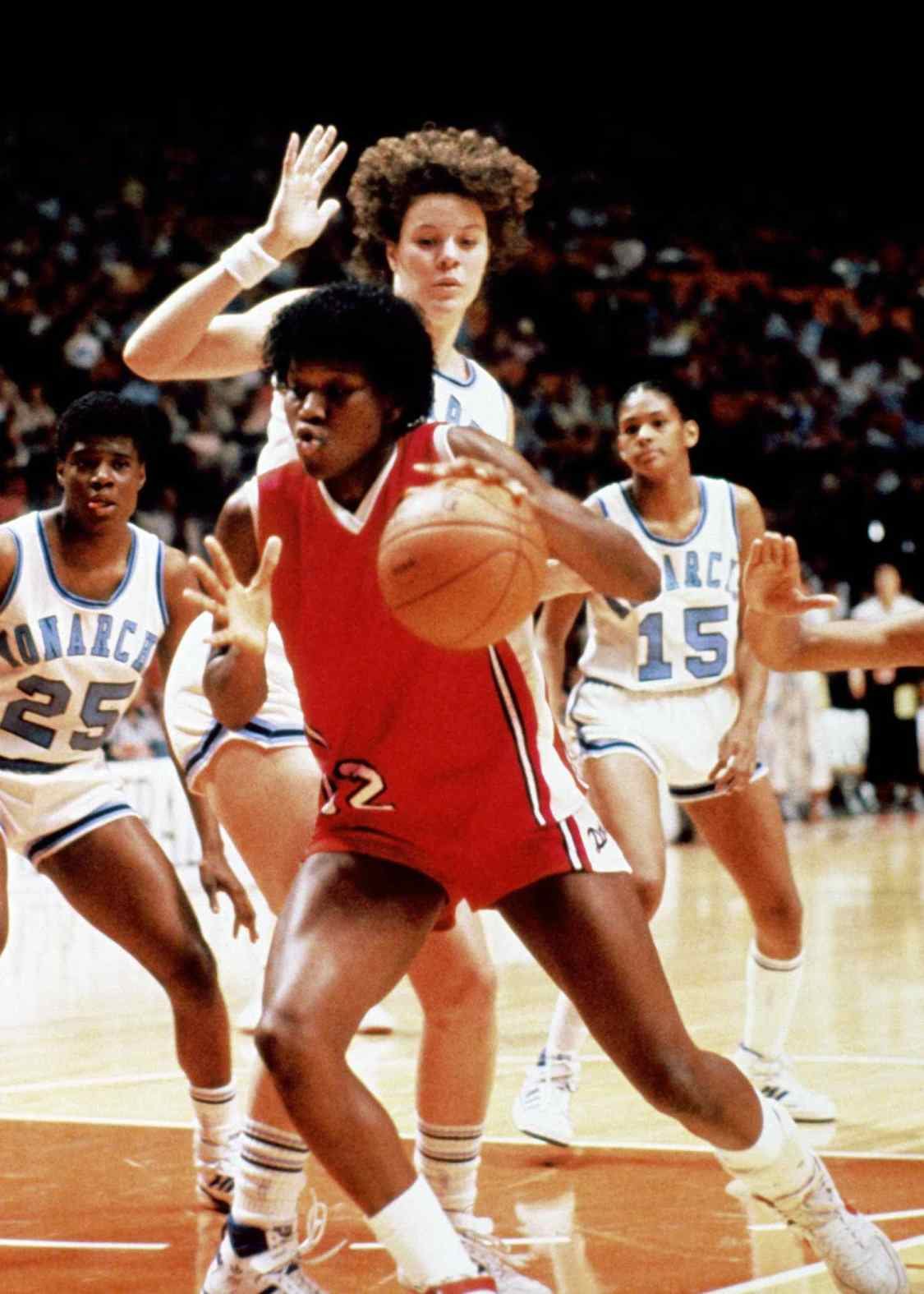
Katrina McClain, former UGA women's basketball player and Olympic gold medalist

Several people from Georgia, or from Georgia schools, have received gold medals at the Olympics over the years. Some of those gold medalists are:

- Brent B. Abernathy
- Alice Marie Coachman
- Teresa Edwards
- Debbie Ferguson
- Vern Fleming
- Katrina McClain
- Courtney Shealy
- Sheila Taormina
- Forrest Towns

== See also ==
- Tour de Georgia
- Bicycle Ride Across Georgia
