= Harold Ellis (basketball) =

American basketball player and coach

Personal information
- Born: October 7, 1970 (age 56) Atlanta, Georgia, U.S.
- Listed height: 6 ft 5 in (1.96 m)
- Listed weight: 225 lb (102 kg)

Career information
- High school: Frederick Douglass (Atlanta, Georgia)
- College: Morehouse (1988–1992)
- NBA draft: 1992: undrafted
- Playing career: 1992–2001
- Position: Shooting guard
- Coaching career: 2001–2009

Career history

Playing
- 1992: Atlanta Eagles
- 1992–1993: Quad City Thunder
- 1993: Atlanta Eagles
- 1993–1994: Quad City Thunder
- 1994–1995: Los Angeles Clippers
- 1995–1996: Aris Thessaloniki
- 1996–1997: Apollon Patras
- 1997: Tau Cerámica
- 1997: Rockford Lightning
- 1997–1998: Denver Nuggets
- 1998–1999: Irakleio
- 1999: Rockford Lightning
- 1999–2001: Las Vegas Silver Bandits

Coaching
- 2001–2002: Roanoke Dazzle (assistant)
- 2004–2006: Rome Gladiators
- 2008–2009: Detroit Pistons (assistant)

Career highlights
- As player: Greek Cup Finals Top Scorer (1997); Greek League All-Star (1996 II); Greek All-Star Game Slam Dunk champion (1996 II); CBA All-Rookie Second Team (1993); As head coach: 2× WBA champion (2005, 2006); 2× WBA Coach of the Year (2005, 2006)
- Stats at NBA.com
- Stats at Basketball Reference
Medals
Men's basketball
Representing the United States
FIBA AmeriCup
Gold medal – first place	1993 San Juan

Harold Ellis (born October 7, 1970) is a retired American professional basketball player. A 6-foot-5-inch (1.96 m) shooting guard from Morehouse College, Ellis was never drafted by a National Basketball Association team but did manage to play in 3 NBA seasons.

== Professional career ==
Following a two-season stint with the Quad City Thunder of the Continental Basketball Association, Ellis played for the Los Angeles Clippers from 1993 to 1995. He then moved to Europe and the Greek Basket League to play for Aris during the 1995–96 season, and Apollon Patras during the 1996–97 season. He then returned to the NBA to play for the Denver Nuggets during the 1997–98 season.

In his NBA career, Ellis played in 145 games and scored a total of 840 points. On January 14, 1994, he scored a career high 29 points as a member of the Clippers versus the Boston Celtics.

== National team career ==
Ellis was a member of the senior Team USA, that won the gold medal at the 1993 FIBA AmeriCup.

== Coaching career ==
Ellis was a minor league coordinator/scout for the Atlanta Hawks for six seasons, before his hiring on June 23, 2008, as an assistant coach to newly hired Detroit Pistons head coach Michael Curry. From 2009 to 2012, he was a scout for the Pistons. In 2012, Ellis was named director of pro scouting for the Orlando Magic.

== Personal life ==
He and his wife Latosha have two children, Lake and Sydney. While a student, he was initiated into the Pi chapter of Kappa Alpha Psi fraternity.
