= Jamario Moon =

American basketball player (born 1980)

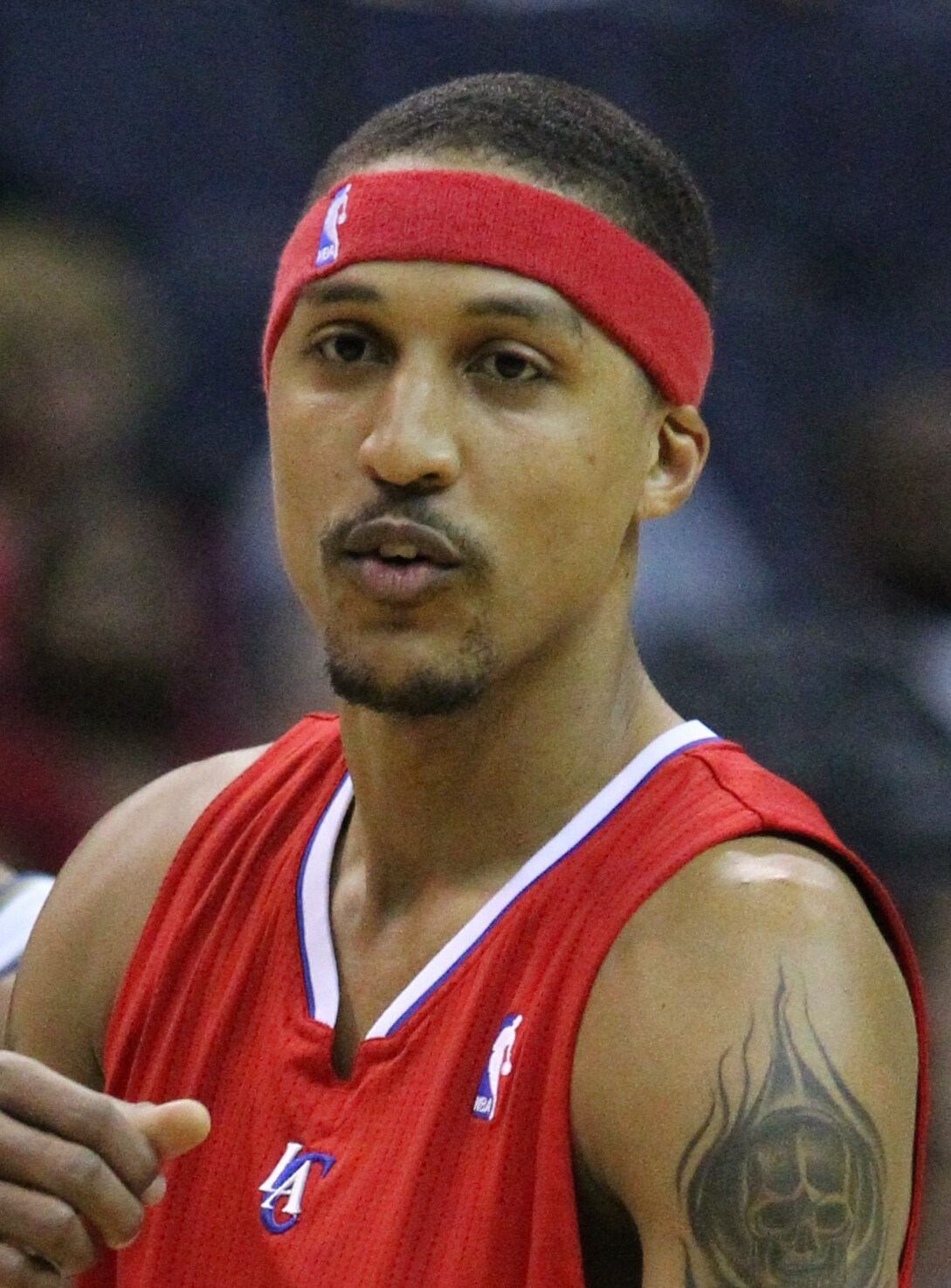
- Moon with the Los Angeles Clippers in 2011

Personal information
- Born: June 13, 1980 (age 46) Goodwater, Alabama, U.S.
- Listed height: 6 ft 8 in (2.03 m)
- Listed weight: 235 lb (107 kg)

Career information
- High school: Coosa Central (Rockford, Alabama)
- College: Meridian CC (1999–2000)
- NBA draft: 2001: undrafted
- Playing career: 2001–2018
- Position: Small forward
- Number: 33, 8, 15, 9

Career history
- 2001–2002: Mobile Revelers
- 2002: Dodge City Legend
- 2002: Mobile Revelers
- 2004: Huntsville Flight
- 2004–2005: Kentucky Colonels
- 2005: Rome Gladiators
- 2005–2006: Albany Patroons
- 2006: Fort Worth Flyers
- 2006: Marietta Storm
- 2006: Fuerza Regia
- 2006–2007: Albany Patroons
- 2007: Gary Steelheads
- 2007: Fuerza Regia
- 2007–2009: Toronto Raptors
- 2009: Miami Heat
- 2009–2011: Cleveland Cavaliers
- 2011: Los Angeles Clippers
- 2012: Los Angeles D-Fenders
- 2012: Charlotte Bobcats
- 2012–2014: Los Angeles D-Fenders
- 2014: Olympiacos
- 2014: Guaros de Lara
- 2014: Los Angeles D-Fenders
- 2015: Guaros de Lara
- 2015: Al Wasl
- 2016: Indios de Mayagüez
- 2017: Parque Hostos
- 2017: Club Atlético Aguada
- 2017–2018: Albany Patroons

Career highlights
- NBA All-Rookie Second Team (2008); All-USBL First Team (2007); USBL All-Defensive Team (2007); All-CBA First Team (2007); CBA Defensive Player of the Year (2007); CBA All-Defensive Team (2007); CBA All-Star Game (2007); LNBP All-Star (2006); WBA champion (2005); All-WBA Fourth Team (2005); WBA All-Defensive Team (2005)
- Stats at NBA.com
- Stats at Basketball Reference

Jamario Raman Moon (born June 13, 1980) is an American former professional basketball player. He played college basketball for one season at Meridian Community College and began his professional career with teams in the United States Basketball League and NBA Development League, the Harlem Globetrotters, and Mexican basketball team Fuerza Regia before signing with the Toronto Raptors in 2007. He has since played for the Miami Heat, Cleveland Cavaliers, Los Angeles Clippers and Charlotte Bobcats of the NBA, along with the Los Angeles D-Fenders of the NBA D-League.

== Professional career ==
=== Early years ===
After attending Coosa Central High School, Moon attended Meridian Community College where he played one season of college basketball for the Eagles in 1999–2000, averaging 20.8 points and 8.7 rebounds per game. After playing for the Milwaukee Bucks in the 2001 NBA Summer League, Moon joined the Mobile Revelers for the 2001–02 season. He then joined the Dodge City Legend following the D-League season. After playing for the Los Angeles Lakers and the Utah Jazz in the 2002 NBA Summer League, he re-joined the Mobile Revelers for the 2002–03 season. He left the Revelers in November 2002.

Moon joined the Huntsville Flight via the 2003 D-League draft but was released by the team prior to the 2003–04 season. He re-joined them in January 2004, he was again released after just one game. After playing for the Harlem Globetrotters in 2004, he joined the Rockford Lightning for the 2004–05 season, but was released prior to the 2004–05 season. In December 2004, he joined the Kentucky Colonels before being released in February 2005. He then helped the Rome Gladiators win the 2005 World Basketball Association (WBA) championship. In December 2005, he joined the Albany Patroons before joining the Fort Worth Flyers in April 2006. He then played for Marietta Storm and Fuerza Regia. In 2006–07, he returned to the Albany Patroons. In 2007, he played for both the Gary Steelheads and Fuerza Regia.

=== NBA ===
Moon signed a two-year deal with the Toronto Raptors on July 10, 2007, after he had impressed the coaching staff in a three-day mini-camp held by the club. In his first start against the Chicago Bulls, he had 12 points, six rebounds, three steals, and one block in 23 minutes. Moon remained in the starting lineup over the next few games, recording 15 points, nine rebounds, six blocks and three steals in another game against the Bulls on November 25. Two days later, Moon broke a club record by recording at least one block in twelve consecutive games.

On February 1, 2008, Moon was named NBA Eastern Conference Rookie of the Month. He had a career-high five steals on January 18 against the Atlanta Hawks, and scored a career-high 17 points against the Cleveland Cavaliers the next night. Moon was invited to participate in two events at the 2008 NBA All-Star Weekend in New Orleans, Louisiana. He scored 13 points for the rookies in the Rookie/Sophomore Challenge, and competed in the Slam Dunk Contest, finishing behind winner Dwight Howard and 2007 defending champion Gerald Green.

On February 13, 2009, Moon was traded by Toronto to the Miami Heat, along with Jermaine O'Neal and conditional draft pick, for Shawn Marion and Marcus Banks.

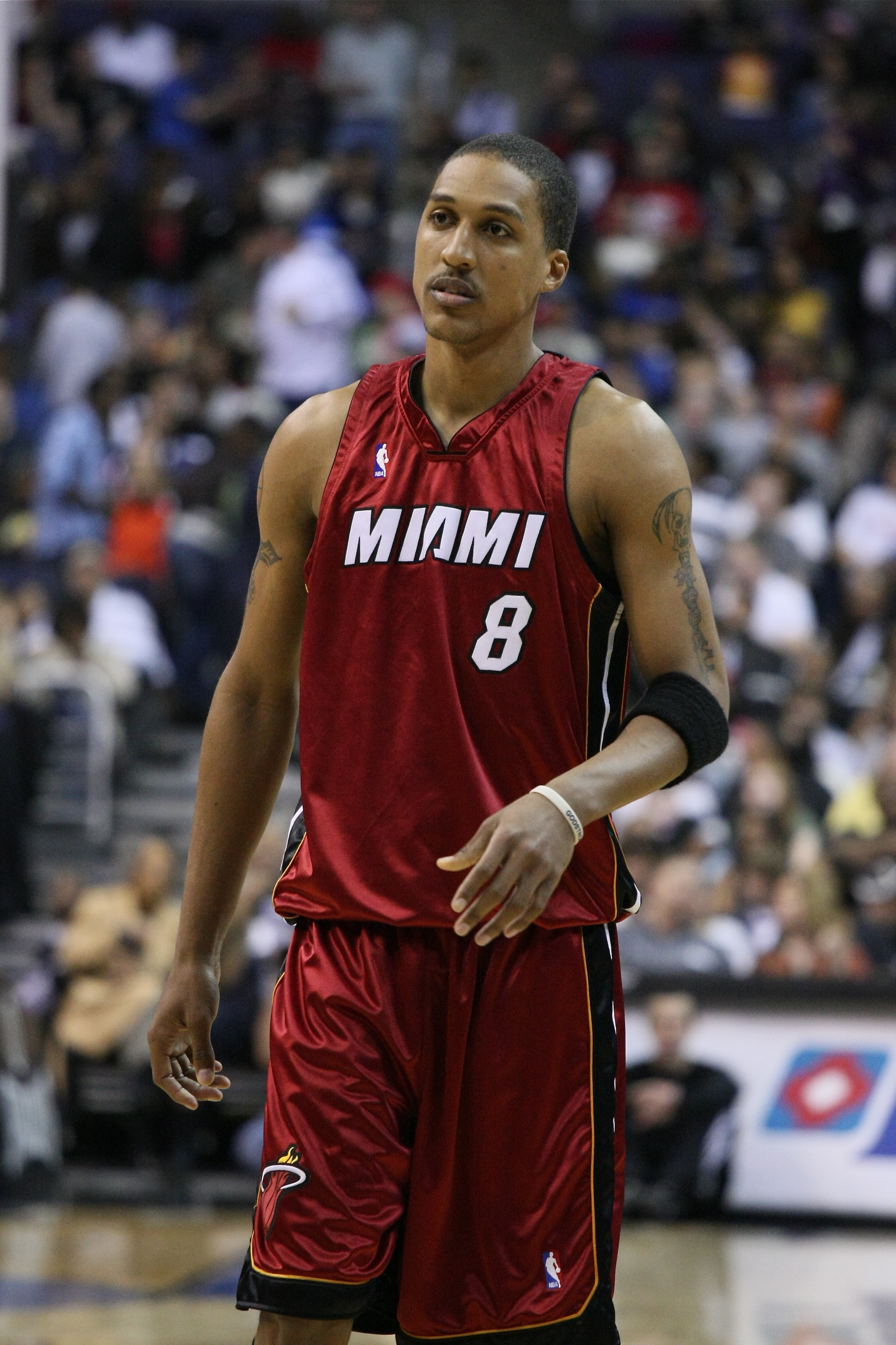
Moon with the Heat in 2009

On July 17, 2009, the Cavaliers signed Moon to an offer sheet. On July 24, the Heat declined to match the offer, and Moon officially joined the Cavaliers. The offer sheet is estimated to be worth $8.92 million over three years (the final year only being partially guaranteed).

On February 24, 2011, Moon was traded to the Los Angeles Clippers along with Mo Williams in exchange for Baron Davis and an unprotected first round pick. The pick ended up #1 overall after the draft lottery, which the Cavaliers used to select Kyrie Irving.

On March 2, 2012, Moon signed with the Los Angeles D-Fenders of the NBA Development League. That month, Moon was named Player of the Month in the league.

On April 15, 2012, Moon signed with the Charlotte Bobcats. On July 2, 2012, he was waived by the Bobcats.

Moon's final NBA game was played on April 26, 2012, in a 84–104 loss to the New York Knicks where he recorded 4 points, 2 assists and 8 rebounds.

=== D-League and International career ===
In November 2012, Moon was re-acquired by the Los Angeles D-Fenders. In November 2013, he was again re-acquired by the Los Angeles D-Fenders. In early January 2014, he left the D-Fenders.

On January 8, 2014, Moon signed with the reigning back-to-back Euroleague champions, Olympiacos of the Greek League, for the rest of the 2013–14 season. In March 2014, he was released by Olympiacos. Later that month, he signed with Guaros de Lara for the 2014 LPB season.

On November 1, 2014, Moon was reacquired by the Los Angeles D-Fenders. On December 18, 2014, he was waived by the D-Fenders.

On January 5, 2015, Moon signed with Guaros de Lara for the 2015 LPB season, returning to the club for a second stint. On February 26, 2015, he was waived by the club.

In the summer of 2017, Moon played in The Basketball Tournament on ESPN for team Trained To Go. He competed for the $2 million prize, and for team Trained To Go, he scored 13 points in 23 minutes on the court. Moon and Trained To Go lost in the first round of the tournament to the Broad Street Brawlers 108–95.

On November 30, 2017, it was announced that Moon would be re-joining the Albany Patroons for his third stint with the team.

In December 2017, Moon briefly played in Uruguay with Club Atlético Aguada.

== NBA career statistics ==
Legend
GP	Games played	GS	Games started	MPG	Minutes per game
FG%	Field goal percentage	3P%	3-point field goal percentage	FT%	Free throw percentage
RPG	Rebounds per game	APG	Assists per game	SPG	Steals per game
BPG	Blocks per game	PPG	Points per game	**Bold**	Career high

=== Regular season ===
Year	Team	GP	GS	MPG	FG%	3P%	FT%	RPG	APG	SPG	BPG	PPG
2007–08	Toronto	**78**	**75**	**27.8**	**.485**	.328	.741	**6.2**	1.2	1.0	**1.4**	**8.5**
2008–09	Toronto	54	39	25.5	.473	.345	.846	4.6	**1.3**	**1.2**	.8	7.3
2008–09	Miami	26	21	26.5	.459	**.370**	.867	4.5	1.0	.8	.6	7.1
2009–10	Cleveland	61	2	17.2	.462	.320	.800	3.1	.8	.6	.5	4.9
2010–11	Cleveland	40	13	19.1	.402	.284	.909	3.0	1.1	.6	.7	4.7
2010–11	L.A. Clippers	19	7	14.6	.424	.393	.833	2.5	.4	.2	.3	3.5
2011–12	Charlotte	8	0	15.4	.292	.200	**1.000**	2.8	.6	.1	.6	2.3
Career		286	157	22.6	.461	.329	.803	4.3	1.0	.8	.8	6.3

=== Playoffs ===
Year	Team	GP	GS	MPG	FG%	3P%	FT%	RPG	APG	SPG	BPG	PPG
2008	Toronto	5	**3**	**20.8**	.379	.364	**1.000**	**4.8**	**.8**	**1.2**	**.6**	**5.4**
2009	Miami	3	0	13.3	**1.000**	**1.000**	.000	3.0	.3	.3	.3	4.0
2010	Cleveland	**11**	0	10.3	.583	.500	.667	1.5	.5	.4	.5	3.5
Career		19	3	13.5	.517	.483	.500	2.6	.5	.6	.5	4.1

== Personal life ==
In January 2009, Moon's wife, Tamara, gave birth to their first child.

Jamario is the uncle of Xavier Moon, who plays professional basketball for the Winnipeg Sea Bears of the Canadian Elite Basketball League.
