= Sports in Georgia =

Sports in Georgia may refer to:

- Sports in Georgia (country)
- Sports in Georgia (U.S. state)
