= Football in Georgia =

Football in Georgia may refer to:

- Football in Georgia (country), association football
- Football in Georgia (U.S. state), American football
