= Gwinnett Majic =

Semi-professional basketball team

- Founded: 2009
- League: IBA
- Team history: Buford Majic (2009); Gwinnett Majic (2010-present)
- Based in: Gwinnett, Georgia
- Arena: Bogan Park
- Colors: Green & yellow
- Head coach: David Akin - Steve Melnick
- Championships: 3 (2009, 2010, 2011)

The Gwinnett Majic is a semi-professional basketball team based in Gwinnett, Georgia, USA. Founded in 2009 as the Buford Majic, the team changed in 2010 with their move to Gwinnett.

== History ==
The Majic competed in the World Basketball Association (WBA) for four seasons (2009–12), winning the league championship three times. (2009, 2010, 2011).

The team was on hiatus from 2012 until fall 2014 when it was announced it would return to compete in the IBA as a "branding team" with three other southern-based teams.
