= Mayas-USA =

- Founded: 2006
- League: WBA 2007–2013
- Team history: Mayas-USA; 2007
- Based in: Dallas, Texas
- Arena: TBA
- Colors: red, white, blue
- Owner: Mayas de Yucatan
- Head coach: Lionel Garrett
- Championships: 1

Mayas-USA was a team of the former World Basketball Association that began play in 2007. It was owned by the Liga Nacional Balonocesto Professional (the primary basketball league in Mexico)'s Mayas de Yucatan, and played its games in Dallas, Texas. Mayas-USA defeated the Gwinnett Ravia-Rebels 114 to 104 in the 2007 league championship game.
