= Franklin Knights =

Minor league basketball team in Franklin, Tennessee

- Founded: 2010
- League: WBA (2010)
- Based in: Franklin, TN
- Arena: A-Game Sportsplex
- Colors: Green, Orange, White, Silver
- Owner: Logan Sekulow
- Head coach: Kris Hooper
- Championships: WBA 2010 Second Place
- Mascot: Sir Loy the Knight Owl

The Franklin Knights are a professional, minor league basketball team based in Franklin, Tennessee, United States. In 2010 they competed in the World Basketball Association and went to the championship game. They were also named the 2010 WBA Team of the Year. The Knights play their home games at the A-Game Sportsplex in Franklin, located just outside Nashville.
