= Sean Banks =

American basketball player (born 1985)

Personal information
- Born: October 20, 1985 (age 41) New York City, New York, U.S.
- Listed height: 6 ft 8 in (2.03 m)

Career information
- High school: Bergen Catholic (Oradell, New Jersey)
- College: Memphis (2003–2005)
- NBA draft: 2005: undrafted
- Playing career: 2005–2011
- Position: Small forward

Career history
- 2005–2006: Tulsa 66ers
- 2006: Anaheim Arsenal
- 2006: Caciques de Humacao
- 2007: Los Angeles D-Fenders
- 2007: Atléticos de San Germán
- 2007–2008: Los Angeles D-Fenders
- 2008–2009: Darüşşafaka
- 2009: Zain Club
- 2010: Gaiteros del Zulia
- 2011: Idaho Stampede

Career highlights
- All-NBA D-League First Team (2008); First-team All-Conference USA (2004)

Sean Anthony Banks (born January 20, 1985) is a 6'8" American retired professional basketball forward.

He attended the University of Memphis, where he was named the Conference USA Freshman of the Year in 2004 after leading all freshman in the conference by scoring 18 points and almost 7 rebounds per game, and was also named as a member of the All-Freshman Team. Despite scoring an average of 14.5 points and nearly 6 rebounds over the first ten games of his sophomore season, Memphis dropped Banks from the team in January 2005 after he was declared academically ineligible.

Banks, who is African American, grew up in Englewood, New Jersey. He is a graduate of Bergen Catholic High School in Oradell, New Jersey. Banks was signed by the New Orleans Hornets as an undrafted rookie free agent in the summer of 2005 and was assigned to the Hornets' NBDL affiliate Tulsa 66ers in November 2005 after averaging four points per game during the preseason and spending the first seven games of the NBA season on inactive status. On January 5, 2006, he was waived by the Hornets and thus released by the 66ers. After being waived, Banks spent time playing professional basketball in Puerto Rico, as well as other D-League teams, including the Idaho Stampede and Los Angeles D-Fenders. While playing with the D-Fenders, Banks was selected to represent the Blue Team in the 2008 D-League All-Star Game, where he scored 14 points as his team won the second annual event by a score of 117–99.

Banks was charged with an August 2011 incident in which it was alleged that he had been part of a group of four men who had robbed homes in Jefferson Township and Sparta, New Jersey before leading police on a high speed chase that resulted in the crash of the stolen vehicle that the group had been driving. Banks was said to be involved with an offshoot of what had been called the "James Bond Gang", which had used high-end sports cars in attempts to outrun police.

On March 8, 2014, Banks was issued a warrant for his arrest after failing to appear at a sentencing in which he had agreed to probation avoiding jail time for assaulting his girlfriend in 2013. Banks now faces years in prison for each of his crimes stemming from a 2013 incident in which Police say Banks assaulted his girlfriend with a broom stick and belt and then restrained her from leaving before fleeing police on foot. Banks was arrested more than four times in 2013, including an incident in which he burglarized a woman's home in Englewood and then slashed her tires as well as failing to appear in court numerous times.
