= Rome Gladiators =

Former American basketball team

- Founded: 2004
- League: WBA (2004–2013)
- Team history: Rome Gladiators (2004–present)
- Based in: Rome, Georgia, USA
- Arena: Winthrop-King Centre
- Colors: ?
- Owner: Theo Ratliff
- Head coach: Harold Ellis
- Championships: 2 (2005, 2006)

The Rome Gladiators, based in Rome, Georgia, were a franchise in the now-defunct World Basketball Association. They played at the Winthrop-King Centre at Shorter College.

== 2004 ==
The Gladiators floundered in their first season, finishing a dismal 6–14. The team went through three different owners, and was at one point owned by the league itself. In May 2004, the Gladiators were bought by current owner, NBA player Theo Ratliff. Ratliff retained coach Harold Ellis, and kept the team in Rome.

== 2005 ==
2005 Champions

Once again coached by Harold Ellis, the Gladiators won their first nine games before being stopped by the WBA's other powerhouse, the Mississippi HardHats, in a 120–115 loss. The Gladiators then went on another nine-game winning streak, before being brought down by both the Magic City Court Kings and the Gulf Coast Bandits. The team finished 21–3 in the regular season, and defeated the HardHats in the championship game. The Glads were led in scoring by Darryl "MaJic" Dorsey, who won the WBA's player of the year award as well, scoring 23 points per game, was first team all-WBA along with Edmund Saunders. Harvey Thomas made second team all-WBA, and Jamario Moon made fourth team all WBA, and was named to the all-defensive team. Ellis received coach of the year. The team was so successful that the city of Rome threw a parade to honor the champs.

== 2006 ==
The Rome Gladiators and the Cartersville Warriors entered the playoffs as 1st and 2nd in the league respectively. Rome ultimately showed itself to be the deeper squad, outscoring Cartersville 15–4 in the second quarter. The Gladiators claimed their second straight WBA title with a score of 125–114 in double-overtime over Warriors.
