= Arkansas ArchAngels =

World Basketball Association team

- Founded: 2005
- League: WBA 2005–2013
- Team history: Arkansas ArchAngels; 2005–2006
- Based in: Little Rock, Arkansas
- Arena: Philander Smith College gymnasium; UALR Field House
- Colors: Purple & Gold
- Owner: Bo Outlaw
- Head coach: Andy Stoglin
- Championships: 0

The Arkansas ArchAngels were a team in the World Basketball Association. They began playing in the 2005 season.

== 2005 season ==
Despite being overshadowed by the highly successful Arkansas RimRockers, the ArchAngels had a decent first season, and received good press coverage. Attendance hung around 200-300 for the first season. The ArchAngels played home games at Philander Smith College. The team finished 16–8, but was stunned in the quarterfinals by the Gulf Coast Bandits, who upset Arkansas 101–96.

== 2006 ==
Silencing questions of the team's future, the ArchAngels unveiled an improved website as well as additional sponsors prior to the '06 season. The team played their home games at the old UALR University of Arkansas at Little Rock Trojan Field House, not the newer Jack Stephens Center. They had a successful season making it to the 2nd round of the WBA Playoffs where they were defeated 106–104, in overtime, by the Marietta Storm.

Despite their on-court success, 2006 would be the final season for the ArchAngels.

== Related links ==
- Official Website
