= Murfreesboro Musicians =

- Founded: 2006
- League: WBA 2006–2013
- Team history: Murfreesboro Musicians; 2006–2008
- Based in: Murfreesboro, Tennessee
- Arena: Oakland H. S. Gym
- Colors: Black and white
- Owner: Musicians Group, Inc
- Head coach: Coach Mike Holloway
- Championships: 0
- Mascot: Musician #1

The Murfreesboro Musicians were a franchise of the now-defunct World Basketball Association that played in Murfreesboro, Tennessee.
