= Gulf Coast Bandits =

- Founded: 2005
- League: WBA 2005
- Team history: Gulf Coast Bandits; 2005
- Based in: Biloxi, Mississippi
- Arena: Mississippi Coast Coliseum
- Colors: Black and white
- Owner: Joe Nelson; Roosevelt Hubbard; Charles "Chase" Davis
- Head coach: ?
- Championships: 0

The Gulf Coast Bandits were a World Basketball Association franchise in Biloxi, Mississippi. The Bandits sat out the 2006 season due to Hurricane Katrina and have since gone out of business.
