= Cartersville Warriors =

- Founded: 2006; 20 years ago
- League: WBA 2006-2010 SEBL 1993-present China Mobil Cup 2009-2011
- Team history: Griffin Warriors; 2006–2006; Cartersville Warriors; 2006; Cartersville-Baseline Warriors; 2007–present
- Based in: Cartersville, Georgia
- Arena: JH Morgan Gym & Cass High School
- Colors: Red w/ white and gold trim
- Owner: The Human Race Inc., David Archer, Amy Archer
- Head coach: David Archer/Bobby Rouse/Cory Baldwin
- Overall record: 21–5
- Championships: 2006 WBA Eastern / 2009, 2010 China Mobil Cup Conference Champions
- Division titles: 1999, 2004, 2007, 2015 SEBL Metro, 2007 SEBL City

The Cartersville-Baseline Warriors (Georgia Warriors) were a World Basketball Association franchise in Cartersville, Georgia, which has also competed extensively in the Southeastern Exposure Basketball League and in China.

== History ==
=== Name and location ===
The Georgia Warriors were formerly the Griffin Warriors in Acworth, Georgia, and later the Cartersville Warriors before adopting the state's name as their locale descriptor. Ownership has changed and the name is now the Cartersville-Baseline Warriors, under the umbrella of The Human Race, Inc, a non-profit organization based in Cartersville (GA) and operated by David and Amy Archer.

The Macon Blaze were in the process of relocating to Griffin, Georgia in Spalding County, when the owner at that time decided to forgo the season. Gerald Williams acquired the market and initially made plans to play home games at Griffin High School, however, the local school board retracted an earlier agreement for use of the gymnasium and the Warriors moved to Cartersville, with the help of David Archer, who had been named general manager and head coach of the team. Fortunately, the Warriors started the 2006 with three road games, giving Archer and Williams time to get a home venue in order. Home games were played at Cass High School and at the famed JH Morgan Gym, also known as the "Bottom Gym" on Aubrey Street in Cartersville (GA).

=== Record ===
==== 2006 season ====
After a starting win at Gainesville Knights on opening night, the Warriors lost to the Rome Gladiators and Marietta Storm, before stabilizing and beginning to put everything together. The Warriors behind the balanced scoring of a very talented roster, went undefeated at home, reeling off an eight-game win streak, to catch Rome in the overall standings. Both teams had a 14–3 record at that time. During the stretch, the Warriors destroyed the WBA single game scoring record with a 178–137 win over the South Carolina Heat. Probasketballnews.com ranked the Warriors the #3 Minor League team in the country in its weekly power polls. However, a loss on the road at Arkansas relegated the Warriors to a second seed going into the 2006 WBA Playoffs, while finishing 4th in the PBN.com power poll. The Warriors defeated North Mississippi 112–89 in the opening round of the WBA Tournament, then avenged the previous loss to Arkansas, with an impressive 112–99 win over the Archangels, to advance to the Title Game. A win in the Semi-finals set up a re-match with the Rome Gladiators, who were the #1 Seed and defending champions. Rome jumped out to an early double-digit lead, forcing the Warriors to play catch up all night. The Warriors, after battling back on several occasion, found themselves back down by 12 going into the final period. But, a late run saw the Warriors tie the score at 99, on a Mike Dean lay-in with only 1.5 left on the regulation clock. In the first overtime, Rome built an eight-point spread, before the Warriors again came back to tie the score with 2:20 left. The Warriors then missed on four consecutive attempts to take the lead. Rome had their chance to win the game in the first overtime, but turned the ball over with 16 seconds on the clock. The Warriors took the ball out and ran the clock down to :08, when Anthony Slater saw an opening and penetrated to the right elbow of the lane, launching a floater, the ball bounced around the rim several times before falling off the rim and into a Rome defender's hands. The clock expired, sending the game to second over time. With the fight taken out of the Warriors, the Gladiators pulled away to claim a 125–114 double-overtime win. The Warriors finished the season at 21-5 overall, including a 3–0 record in the Latin National Tournament in Atlanta (GA) before the 2006 WBA Season began. The Warriors were granted a bid to the tournament by organizers of the event. The Warriors claimed the 2006 WBA Eastern Conference Title, before advancing to the Title Game.

Head Coach David Archer was named the 2006 Co-Head Coach of the Year, along with being honored by Pro Basketball News as one of the Top 12 pro coaches in the USA that are not yet in the NBA. Mike Dean, who averaged 28.0 ppg was named Co-Player of the Year, while Bobby Brown received the '06 WBA Defensive Player of the Year award.

After the 2006 WBA season, the Warriors joined the SEBL Summer Pro League, also headquartered in Cartersville. With many players absent, the team struggled through the regular season with a 2–6 record, before peaking in the playoffs and advancing to the SEBL Final Four. The Warriors lost the eventual champs, BC Lakers, in the semis. Joe Hamilton led the SEBL in scoring with a 25.7 average.

==== 2007 ====
In 2007, after combining with BaselineUSA and sliding under the umbrella of The Human Race, Inc., a Georgia Non-profit Corporation, the newly named Cartersville Baseline Warriors sat out the 2007 WBA season. The team won the 2007 SEBL Summer Pro League then the SEBLi 2007-8 Championship with a 22–4 overall record, before taking a tour to China in April, where they posted a 7–5 record competing against the Chinese Basketball Association's pro teams. The Warriors have rejoined the WBA for the 2008 season.

==== 2008-2009 ====
After, claiming the 2008 SEBL North Division Regular Season Championship, the Cartersville-Baseline Warriors made another trip to China in September. The Warriors took the 2008–09 regular season off, then with Coach David Archer, returned to China for a month-long tour in May, where they posted a 12–4 record against Chinese CBA teams such as the Bayi Rockets, Wanma and Guangsha, as well as teams from Korea and Lithuania. The Warriors claimed two China Mobile International Cup Titles and two Friendly Challenge Series titles. Upon return from China, the Warriors immediately rejoined the WBA under the leadership of Bobby Rouse as general manager and Cory Baldwin, as the head coach. They are already 2–0 in the early going of the season, with wins over Rome and Memphis.
