= Marietta Storm =

World Basketball Association franchise

- Founded: 2006
- League: WBA (2006-present)
- Based in: Marietta, Georgia
- Arena: Smyrna Recreation Complex
- Colors: Maroon, White, Black, Yellow
- Owner: Melvin Breeden
- Dancers: Storm Chasers

The Marietta Storm is a World Basketball Association franchise based in Marietta, Georgia founded in 2006 by JustUs, LLC, Jennifer Lester, Una Snipes, Stacey Beverley, Tiphanie Watson and Tommy Lester III." The inaugural team included player Jamario Moon. Games were played at Life University in Marietta, Georgia. The team won the World Basketball Association franchise of the year in its first season.

The team is currently owned by music mogul Melvin "Mel-Man" Breeden. The Storm plays its home games at Smyrna Recreation Complex in Smyrna, Ga, just outside Atlanta.

== 2011 Team roster ==
1. Andrew Francis, 6'7", Rwanda
2. Ashton Pitts, 6'7"
3. Marquis Ruffin, 6'2", Eastern New Mexico
4. Andrew Martin, 6'2", Shorter College
5. Alex Cornett, 6'10, Kennesaw State
6. Isaac Jones, 6'9", Southern Polytechnic University
7. Desmond Blue, 6'10", MTSU
8. Dietrick King, 6'6", ASA College
9. Frank Moultrie, 6'0", Kuztown University [2011 1st Draft Pick]
10. Scott Mennicke, 5'11"
11. Travis De'Grout, 6'3", Czech Republic
12. Vincent Brooks, 6'2", Garden State Rebels

== 2010 Team roster ==
1. Lance Perique, 6'8", Labanon Fachun
2. Alex Owumi, 6'4", France Quimper
3. Jonathan Jackson, 6'8", L.A. Push
4. John Thomas, 6'6", Assis Basket
5. Daryl Ruffus, 6'8", Mexico Bucanoroes
6. Anthony Pettaway, 6'8", Dachun Spurs
7. Leonard Mendez, 6'5", Georgia State University
8. Deandre Bray, 5'5", Jacksonville State
9. Chucky Frierson, 6'6", Norway Baerum
10. Anthony Joseph, 6'8", Emporia State University
11. Paul Harper, 6'7", University of West Georgia
12. Parrish Brown, 6'1", Maryland
13. Casey Love, 6'6"
14. Scott Mennicke, 5'10", Sequoyah High School (2010 First Draft Pick)
15. Andrew Martin, 6'3", Shorter College
16. Stefhon Hannah, 6'2", Missouri
- Team Owner: Melvin Breeden
- Head coach:TBA
- Assistant coach: Kevin Tracy
- Assistant Coach/Trainer: TBA

== Related links ==
- Official Website
