= World Basketball Association =

American men's basketball league

World Basketball Association (WBA)
- Sport: Basketball
- Founded: 2004
- Folded: 2013
- Motto: "The next best thing to the NBA"
- No. of teams: 7
- Country: USA
- Continent: FIBA Americas (Americas)
- Last champion: Anderson Upstate Heat
- Most titles: Gwinnett Majic (3)
- Website: www.WBAball.net

The World Basketball Association (WBA) was a semi-professional men's spring basketball league in the United States. The league suspended operations after the 2013 season.

== History ==
The WBA was conceived in 2009, with seven teams scheduled to play. One of those original seven, the Chattanooga Majic, did not start the season and was replaced by the Bristol Crusaders.

== Final teams ==
Team	City	Arena	Head coach
Atlanta Blaze	Brookhaven, Georgia	Lynwood Gymnasium	Lionel Garrett
Conyers Court Kings	Conyers, Georgia	J.P. Carr Gynmnasium	Nolley Larry
Gastonia Gamers	Gastonia, North Carolina	Ashbrook High School Gymnasium	TBA
Gwinnett Majic	Gwinnett County, Georgia	Bogan Park Gymnasium	David Akin
Mauldin Stars	Greenville, South Carolina	TBA	TBA
Rome Gladiators	Rome, Georgia	Winthrop-King Centre	Jackie Copeland
Upstate Heat	Anderson, South Carolina	Anderson Recreation Center	Frederick Summer

== Former teams ==
- Arkansas ArchAngels (2005–06)
- Atlanta Hardhats
- Birmingham Steel (never played)
- Bristol Crusaders (2004)
- Chattanooga Majic (never played)
- Cleveland Majic (2005–06)
- Decatur Court Kings
- Druid City Dragons (2006)
- Florida Flight (2010)
- Floyd County Rage
- Fort Worth Star Prospects
- Franklin Knights (2010)
- Raleigh Knights (2004) then Gainesville Knights (2005–06) (withdrew during season)
- Georgia Warriors (2006–08) (formed as Cartersville Warriors in 2006)
- Gulf Coast Bandits (2005)
- Gwinnett Ravia-Rebels
- Jackson Rage (2004)
- Kentucky Reach (2004–05)
- Macon Blaze (2005)
- Magic City Court Kings (2005–06) (withdrew during 2006 season)
- Mayas-USA
- Marietta Storm (2006-08)
- Mississippi Hardhats (2004–2009)
- Mississippi Miracles (2007)
- Murfreesboro Musicians (2006–08)
- Newport News Wildcats (never played)
- North Mississippi Tornadoes
- Southern Crescent Lightning (2004–05)
- Texas Tycoons
- Tunica Gamblers (2004–05)
- Tupelo Rock-n-Rollers (2009–10)

== Champions ==
Year	Champion	Runner-up	Result
2004	Southern Crescent Lightning	Jackson Rage	82-79
2005	Rome Gladiators	Mississippi Hardhats	103-100
2006	Rome Gladiators	Cartersville Warriors	125-114
2007	Mayas-USA	Gwinnett Ravia-Rebels	114-104
2008	Decatur Court Kings	Buford Majic	131-128 (2OT)
2009	Buford Majic	Tupelo Rock-n-Rollers	95-93
2010	Gwinnett Majic	Franklin Knights	133-113
2011	Gwinnett Majic	Conyers Court Kings	113-91
2012	No championship		
2013	Anderson Upstate Heat	Rome Gladiators	
