= List of NCAA Division I men's basketball career blocks leaders =

In basketball, a block (short for blocked shot) occurs when a defender deflects or stops a field goal attempt without committing a foul. The top 25 highest blocks totals in NCAA Division I men's basketball history are listed below. The NCAA did not split into its current divisions format until August 1973. From 1906 to 1955, there were no classifications to the NCAA nor its predecessor, the Intercollegiate Athletic Association of the United States (IAAUS). Then, from 1956 to spring 1973, colleges were classified as either "NCAA University Division (Major College)" or "NCAA College Division (Small College)". Blocks are a relatively new statistic in college basketball, having only become an official statistic beginning with the 1985–86 season.

Many well-known players, such as Hall of Famers Ralph Sampson, David Robinson and Hakeem Olajuwon accumulated college block totals that would have placed them in the top 25 all-time if they had not played before blocks were a recognized statistic. Olajuwon played for Houston and accumulated 454 blocks in his three-year career. Robinson, meanwhile, evenly split his four-year career at Navy between the pre-block and the recognized-block statistical eras. For his entire college career, Robinson recorded 516 blocks, but since only his junior and senior seasons' block totals are officially recognized, his two-year sum of 351 blocks does not even rank in the top 25 all-time. Jarvis Varnado of Mississippi State, therefore, holds the Division I record for career blocks with 564. He played for the Bulldogs from 2006–07 through 2009–10 and surpassed Wojciech Myrda's mark of 535 during his senior season. Although Varnado ended with 29 more blocks than Myrda, it took him 26 more games—nearly the amount of a complete season—to finish with that total.

Two of the top eight shot blockers played college basketball for only three seasons. Adonal Foyle of Colgate recorded 492 blocks in just 87 career games before he left one season early for the National Basketball Association (NBA). Foyle would get drafted 8th overall by the Golden State Warriors in the 1997 NBA draft. Meanwhile, Shawn James played in 83 games while registering 443 blocks. James played for two seasons at Northeastern before transferring to Duquesne for one season. At the conclusion of his junior year in 2007–08, James hired an agent after declaring himself eligible for the 2008 draft, thereby forgoing his final season of NCAA eligibility. He was never drafted.

Two schools on this list have two players represented. UConn's Emeka Okafor and Hasheem Thabeet each played three years for the Huskies before also declaring themselves for the NBA Draft. Northwestern State's D'or Fischer and William Mosley are both on this list, but Fischer only played for two seasons at Northwestern State before transferring to West Virginia.

== Key ==
Pos.	G	F	C	Ref.
Position	Guard	Forward	Center	References

^	Player still active in NCAA Division I
*	Elected to the Naismith Memorial Basketball Hall of Fame
C	Player was active in the 2020–21 season, benefiting from the NCAA's blanket COVID-19 eligibility waiver
Team (X)	Denotes the number of times a player from that team is represented on this list

== Top 25 career blocks leaders ==
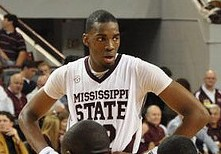
Jarvis Varnado holds the NCAA record with 564 blocks.

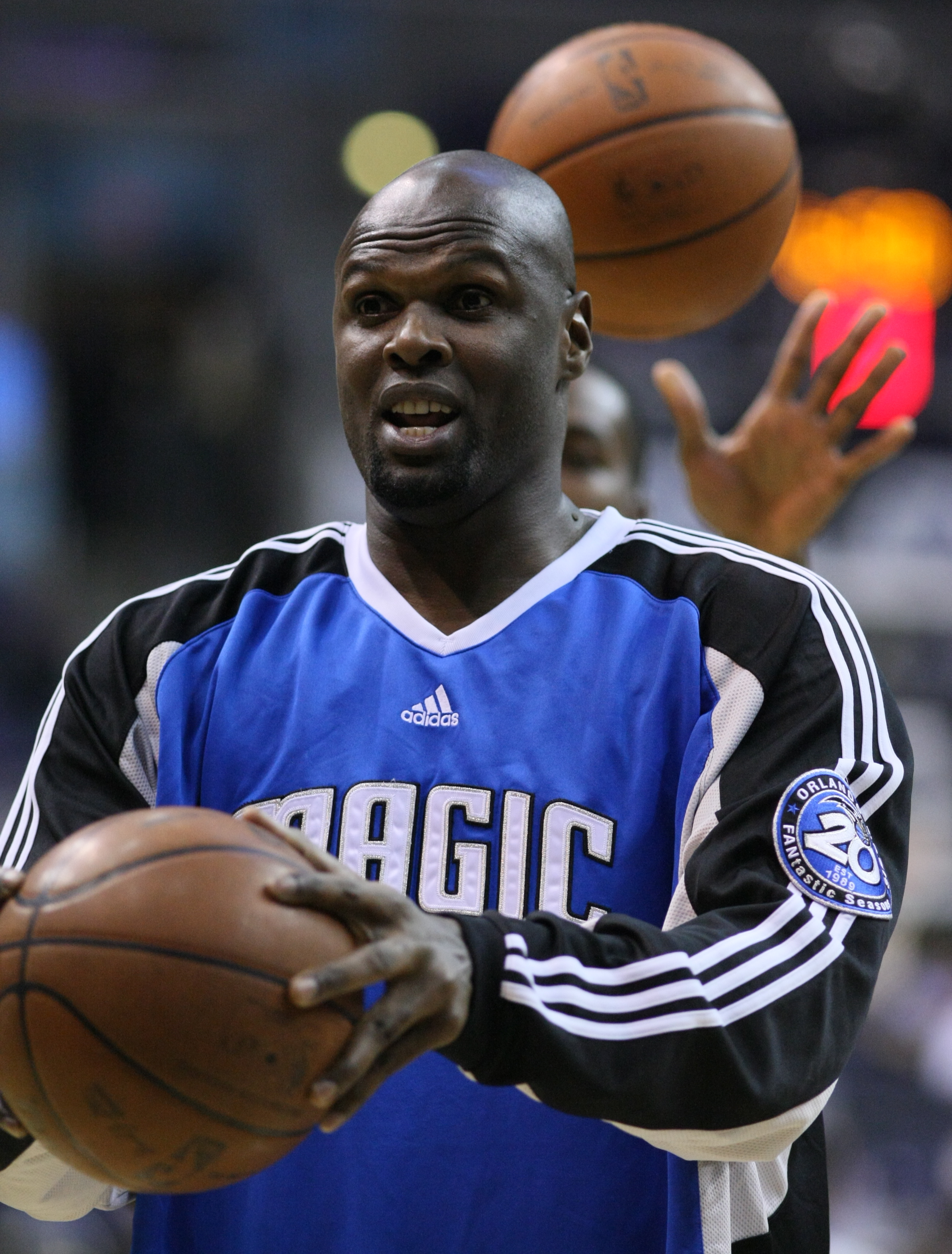
Adonal Foyle recorded 492 blocks in 87 games.

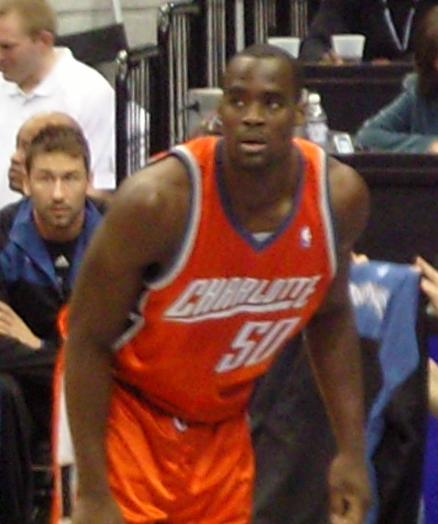
Emeka Okafor finished with 441 blocks.

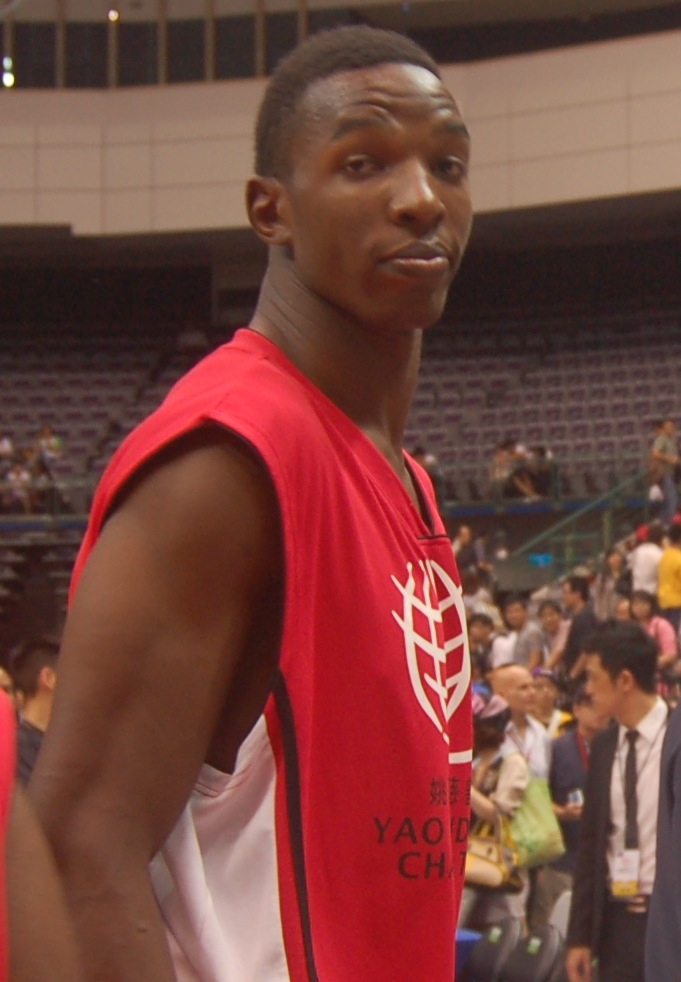
Hasheem Thabeet recorded 417 blocks.

Player	Pos.	Team	Career start	Career end	Games played	Blocks	Ref.
Jarvis Varnado	F	Mississippi State	2006	2010	141	564	
Wojciech Myrda	C	Louisiana–Monroe	1998	2002	115	535	
Adonal Foyle	C	Colgate	1994	1997	87	492	
Tim Duncan*	C	Wake Forest	1993	1997	128	481	
William Mosley	C	Northwestern State	2008	2012	124	456	
Alonzo Mourning*	C	Georgetown	1988	1992	120	453	
Tarvis Williams	F/C	Hampton	1997	2001	114	452	
Ken Johnson	C	Ohio State	1997	2001	127	444	
Shawn James	F	Northeastern / Duquesne	2004	2008	83	443	
Deng Gai	F	Fairfield	2001	2005	100	442	
Emeka Okafor	C	UConn	2001	2004	103	441	
Lorenzo Coleman	C	Tennessee Tech	1993	1997	113	437	
Calvin Booth	C	Penn State	1995	1999	114	428	
Theo Ratliff	C	Wyoming	1991	1995	111	425	
Alvin Jones	C	Georgia Tech	1997	2001	124	425	
Etan Thomas	F	Syracuse	1996	2000	122	424	
Shelden Williams	F	Duke	2002	2006	139	422	
Rodney Blake	F	Saint Joseph's	1984	1988	116	419	
Johni Broome^{C}	F/C	Morehead State / Auburn	2020	2025	168	419	
Hasheem Thabeet	C	UConn (2)	2006	2009	100	417	
Shaquille O'Neal*	C	LSU	1989	1992	90	412	
Kevin Roberson	C	Vermont	1988	1992	112	409	
Ryan Kalkbrenner^{C}	C	Creighton	2020	2025	169	399	
Stephane Lasme	F	Massachusetts	2003	2007	118	399	
Jim McIlvaine	C	Marquette	1990	1994	118	399	
Mickell Gladness	F/C	Alabama A&M	2005	2008	85	396	
