= List of NCAA Division I men's basketball players with 13 or more blocks in a game =

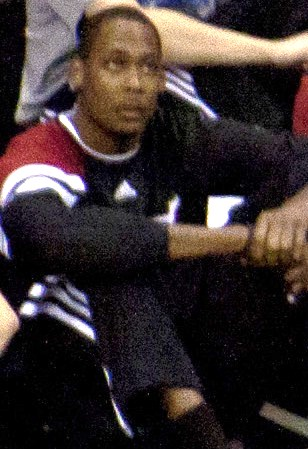
Mickell Gladness holds the record for most blocks in a game (16).

In basketball, a block (short for blocked shot) occurs when a defender deflects or stops a field goal attempt without committing a foul. The National Collegiate Athletic Association's (NCAA) Division I players on this list all accomplished the rare feat of blocking 13 shots in a single game. The 1985–86 season was the first that statistics on blocks were first compiled by the NCAA.

The highest single game block total by one player in NCAA Division I men's basketball history is 16, set by Mickell Gladness of Alabama A&M on February 24, 2007 against Texas Southern. Although Gladness holds the single-game record, it is Jarvis Varnado of Mississippi State who claims the all-time career blocked shots record (564). Varnado never blocked 13 or more shots in a game, however. Through the 2015–16 season, only 18 different players have reached the 13-block mark. Among them, Gladness is the only player to have reached 16 blocks, nobody has blocked 15, five players have reached 14, and twelve players have hit 13 blocks.

David Robinson once blocked 14 shots in a game while playing for Navy, and is the only player on this list to be inducted into the Naismith Memorial Basketball Hall of Fame.

In the era before blocks were officially tracked by the entire NCAA, on December 3, 1983, Hakeem Olajuwon blocked 16 shots in a game while playing for the University of Houston against Biscayne. The blocks are a school record and would have tied the NCAA Division I record. Like Robinson, Olajuwon has also been inducted into the Basketball Hall of Fame.

In the 1950s Bill Russell's shot-blocking ability was touted in his junior and senior year, but there were no official statistics of blocks then and scant film of survives from his college career. However, film exists of his final game as a college player, in which his University of San Francisco team clinched the NCAA championship for the second year in a row to cap an undefeated season, and Russell is unofficially credited with 20 blocked shots in that game (to go with 26 points and 27 rebounds, a double-triple-double).

== Key ==
Pos.	G	F	C	Ref.
Position	Guard	Forward	Center	Reference(s)

Class (Cl.) key
Fr	Freshman	So	Sophomore	Jr	Junior	Sr	Senior

*	Elected to the Naismith Memorial Basketball Hall of Fame

== Dates of 13+ blocks ==
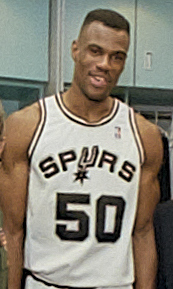
David Robinson is in the Naismith Memorial Basketball Hall of Fame.

Blocks	Player	Pos.	Cl.	Team	Opponent	Date	Ref.
16	Mickell Gladness	C	Jr	Alabama A&M	Texas Southern	February 24, 2007	
14	Shawn Bradley	C	Fr	BYU	Eastern Kentucky	December 7, 1990	
14	Darrius Garrett	F	So	Richmond	Massachusetts	January 13, 2010	
14	David Robinson*	C	Jr	Navy	UNC Wilmington	January 4, 1986	
14	Roy Rogers	F	Sr	Alabama	Georgia	February 10, 1996	
14	Loren Woods	C	Jr	Arizona	Oregon	February 3, 2000	
13	Joel Anthony	C	Sr	UNLV	TCU	February 7, 2007	
13	Keith Closs	C	Fr	Central Connecticut	Saint Francis (PA)	December 21, 1994	
13 ^{(NIT)}	Kyle Davis	C	Fr	Auburn	Miami (Florida)	March 14, 2001	
13	Adrian Diaz	F	Jr	FIU	UAB	March 7, 2015	
13	D'or Fischer	C/F	So	Northwestern State	Texas State	January 22, 2001	
13	Deng Gai	F	Sr	Fairfield	Siena	January 22, 2005	
13	Mickell Gladness (2)	F	Jr	Alabama A&M	Prairie View A&M	February 26, 2007	
13	Anthony King	C	So	Miami (Florida)	Florida A&M	November 29, 2004	
13	Jim McIlvaine	C	Jr	Marquette	Northeastern Illinois	December 9, 1992	
13	Wojciech Myrda	C	Sr	Louisiana–Monroe	UTSA	January 17, 2002	
13	Kevin Roberson	C	Sr	Vermont	New Hampshire	January 9, 1992	
13	Hassan Whiteside	C	Fr	Marshall	UCF	February 27, 2010	
13	Sean Williams	F/C	Jr	Boston College	Duquesne	December 28, 2006	

== See also ==
- List of National Basketball Association players with most blocks in a game
