= Adonal Foyle =

Vincentian-American former professional basketball player (born 1975)

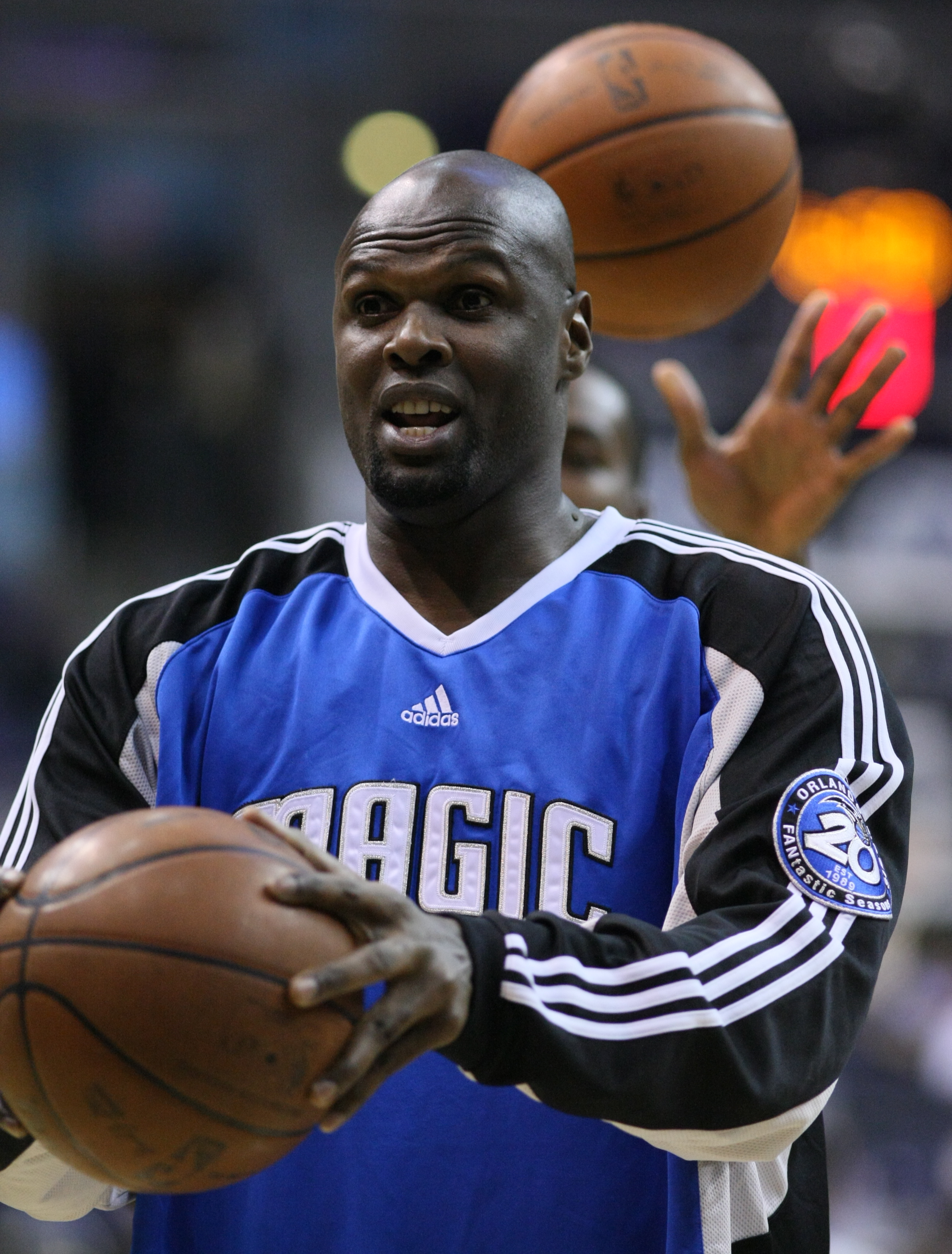
- Foyle with the Orlando Magic in 2008

Personal information
- Born: March 9, 1975 (age 51) Canouan, Saint Vincent, Saint Vincent and the Grenadines
- Listed height: 6 ft 10 in (2.08 m)
- Listed weight: 270 lb (122 kg)

Career information
- High school: Hamilton (Hamilton, New York)
- College: Colgate (1994–1997)
- NBA draft: 1997: 1st round, 8th overall pick
- Drafted by: Golden State Warriors
- Playing career: 1997–2010
- Position: Center
- Number: 31, 30

Career history
- 1997–2007: Golden State Warriors
- 2007–2009: Orlando Magic
- 2009: Memphis Grizzlies
- 2009–2010: Orlando Magic

Career highlights
- Second-team All-American – USBWA (1997); Third-team All-American – AP (1997); NCAA blocks leader (1997); 2× Patriot League Player of the Year (1996, 1997); Patriot League tournament MVP (1996); No. 31 retired by Colgate Raiders; McDonald's All-American (1994); Third-team Parade All-American (1994)

Career NBA statistics
- Points: 2,989 (4.1 ppg)
- Rebounds: 3,461 (4.7 rpg)
- Blocks: 1,193 (1.6 bpg)
- Stats at NBA.com
- Stats at Basketball Reference

Adonal David Foyle (born March 9, 1975) is a Vincentian-American former professional basketball center. He was selected by the Golden State Warriors with the eighth overall selection of the 1997 NBA draft. Foyle played ten seasons with the Warriors until the team bought out his contract on August 13, 2007. At the time, he had been Golden State's longest-tenured player. He then played two seasons with the Orlando Magic and part of the 2008–09 season with the Memphis Grizzlies, sat out the next season due to knee surgery, and retired. As of 2018, Foyle does Warriors post-game commentary for ABC 7 in San Francisco.

== Early life and college career ==
Foyle was born in Canouan, St. Vincent and the Grenadines. At the age of 15, Foyle was adopted by Joan and Jay Mandle, professors at Colgate University. He first attended high school at Cardinal O'Hara Catholic High in Springfield, Pennsylvania. He transferred after sophomore year and attended high school at Hamilton Central School (Hamilton, New York), where he helped the HCS Emerald Knights gain their first two state championships. As of 2016, his 47 points and 25 rebounds in the NYSPHSAA Class D semifinals in 1994 are tied for the most in either statistical category in a state tournament game.

In his official biography, Foyle explained that he enrolled at Colgate University because "he wanted the opportunity to learn the principles of the game in a slower-paced setting, where the coach would be able to give him the attention he desired." With the Colgate Raiders, he was the school's all-time-leading rebounder and 2nd-all-time-leading scorer. He led the Raiders to their first two NCAA tournament appearances in school history. He left as the NCAA's all-time leader in blocked shots with 492, despite playing only three college seasons (his record was broken by Wojciech Myrda in 2002). He now ranks third all-time, behind Myrda and Jarvis Varnado.

In 1999, Foyle graduated from Colgate magna cum laude with a history degree. Politically motivated, he founded the organization Democracy Matters, which tries to curb the effects of money on politics.

== NBA career ==
In his NBA career, Foyle averaged 4.1 points and 1.6 blocks per game. He was among the top 10 in blocks per game three times during his career.

In July 2004, during the offseason, the Golden State Warriors re-signed Foyle to a six-year, $42 million contract. Foyle played sparingly during the 2006–07 season under head coach Don Nelson, and was waived by the Warriors on August 13, 2007, with three years and $29.2 million remaining on his contract.

On August 23, 2007, Foyle signed with the Orlando Magic for the veteran's minimum of $1.3 million. On August 2, 2008, he re-signed with the Magic for another year, also at the veteran's minimum.

He was traded to the Memphis Grizzlies on February 19, 2009.

On March 1, 2009, the Grizzlies waived Foyle. He signed with the Orlando Magic on March 23, 2009, for the rest of the season. Later that year, in August, Foyle re-signed with the Magic. However, he underwent arthroscopic knee surgery before the season began, and did not play that season. On August 17, 2010, Foyle announced his retirement. On September 7, 2010, the Magic named Foyle the team's director of player development, which he held until 2012.

== Off the court ==
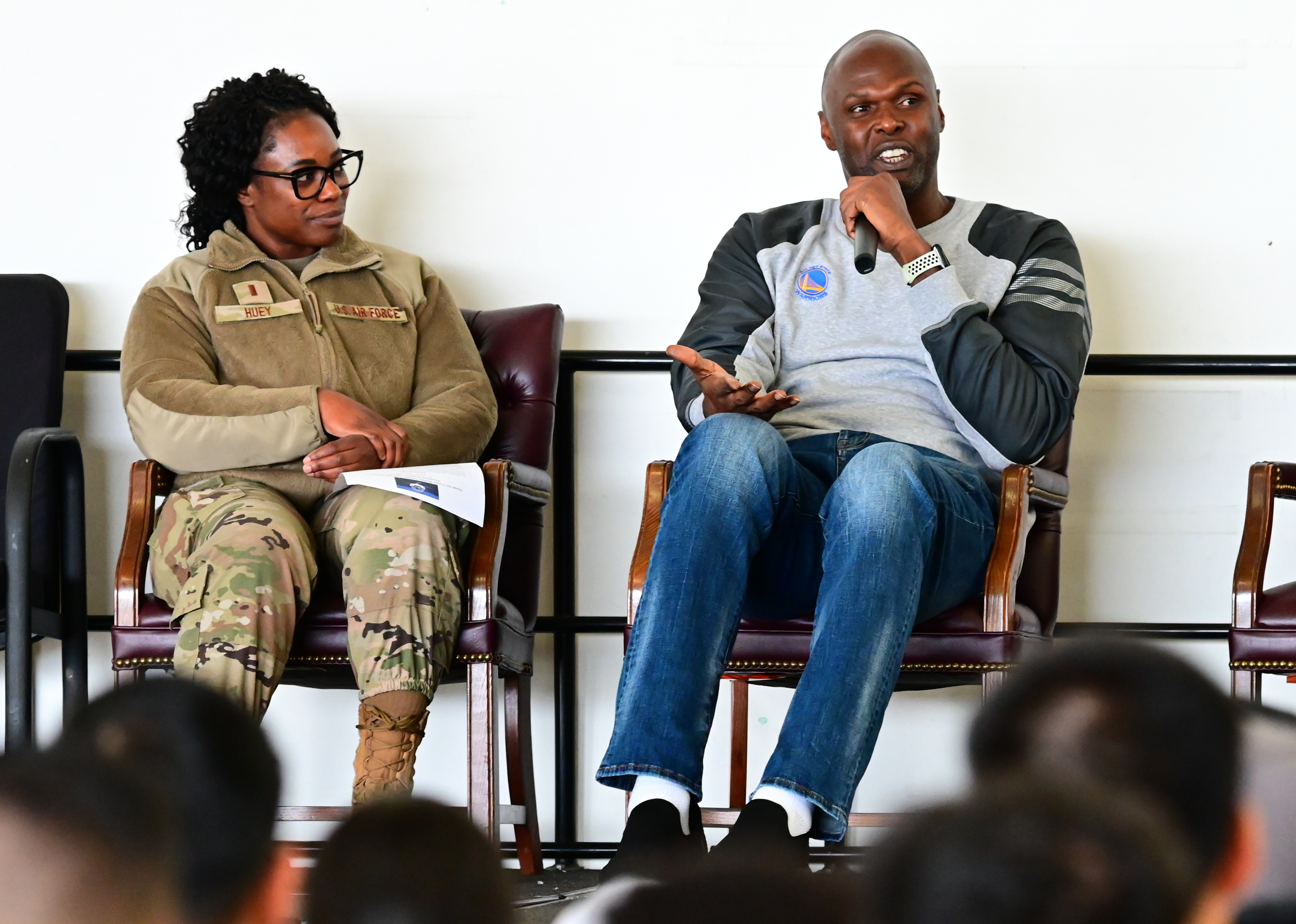
Foyle (right) speaking to guardsmen at Moffett Federal Airfield on behalf of the Golden State Warriors in 2024

In his spare time, Foyle writes poems and is a political activist. He has reviewed books for Hoop magazine.

In 2001, he founded Democracy Matters, a non-partisan student organization, as an effort to counteract political apathy on college campuses. The organization's signature issue is campaign finance reform, particularly Clean Elections. Active on over 50 college campuses, Democracy Matters involves hundreds of students and faculty nationwide through teach-ins, letter writing and petition campaigns, educational seminars, and voter registration drives.

In 2005, Foyle founded the Kerosene Lamp Foundation, which serves children in St. Vincent & the Grenadines.

He played a cameo role of "detective" in the 2006 movie The Darwin Awards.

Foyle became an American citizen on March 13, 2007, after being in the U.S. for almost 18 years. He also became a member of the National Basketball Players Association executive committee.

He was elected to the Common Cause National Governing Board in 2008.

On September 24, 2009, Foyle was inducted into the World Sports Humanitarian Hall of Fame. Only eight other NBA players have been inducted into the World Sports Humanitarian Hall of Fame (Nate "Tiny" Archibald, Vlade Divac, Julius Erving, A. C. Green, Kevin Johnson, Dikembe Mutombo, David Robinson and Steve Smith).

In 2013, Foyle released his first children's book, called Too Tall Foyle Finds His Game.

In January 2014, Foyle traveled to Spain and Morocco as a Sports Diplomacy Sports Envoy for the U.S. Department of State. In this function, he worked with Ruth Riley to conduct basketball clinics for more than 600 youth from under-served areas. In so doing, Foyle helped contribute to Sports Diplomacy's mission to promote conflict resolution, leadership, greater understanding and inclusion through sport.

The Golden State Warriors appointed Foyle as the team's community ambassador in 2014.

== NBA career statistics ==
Legend
GP	Games played	GS	Games started	MPG	Minutes per game
FG%	Field goal percentage	3P%	3-point field goal percentage	FT%	Free throw percentage
RPG	Rebounds per game	APG	Assists per game	SPG	Steals per game
BPG	Blocks per game	PPG	Points per game	**Bold**	Career high
*	Led the league

=== Regular season ===
Year	Team	GP	GS	MPG	FG%	3P%	FT%	RPG	APG	SPG	BPG	PPG
1997–98	Golden State	55	1	11.9	.406	.000	.435	3.3	.3	.2	.9	3.0
1998–99	Golden State	44	0	14.0	.430	.000	.490	4.4	.4	.3	1.0	2.9
1999–00	Golden State	76	59	21.8	.508	.000	.378	5.6	.6	.3	1.8	5.5
2000–01	Golden State	58	37	**25.1**	.416	.000	.441	**7.0**	**.8**	.5	**2.7**	**5.9**
2001–02	Golden State	79	36	18.8	.444	.000	.398	4.9	.5	.5	2.1	4.8
2002–03	Golden State	**82**	0	21.8	.536	.000	**.673**	6.0	.5	.5	2.5	5.4
2003–04	Golden State	44	8	13.0	.454	.000	.543	3.8	.4	.1	1.0	3.1
2004–05	Golden State	78	50	21.8	.502	.000	.556	5.5	.7	.3	2.0	4.5
2005–06	Golden State	77	**72**	23.7	.507	.000	.612	5.5	.4	**.6**	1.6	4.5
2006–07	Golden State	48	6	9.9	.565	.000	.440	2.6	.4	.2	1.0	2.2
2007–08	Orlando	**82***	0	9.4	.458	.000	.471	2.5	.2	.2	.5	1.9
2008–09	Orlando	9	0	6.6	**.636**	.000	.500	2.9	.1	.0	.9	1.9
2008–09	Memphis	1	0	3.0	.000	.000	.000	.0	.0	.0	.0	.0
Career		733	269	17.8	.476	.000	.499	4.7	.5	.4	1.6	4.1

=== Playoffs ===
Year	Team	GP	GS	MPG	FG%	3P%	FT%	RPG	APG	SPG	BPG	PPG
2007	Golden State	**3**	0	2.0	**1.000**	.000	.000	.7	.0	.0	.0	**.7**
2008	Orlando	**3**	0	**3.7**	.333	.000	.000	**1.0**	.0	.0	.0	**.7**
2009	Orlando	2	0	2.0	.000	.000	.000	.5	.0	.0	.0	.0
Career		8	0	2.5	.400	.000	.000	.8	.0	.0	.0	.5

== See also ==
- List of NCAA Division I men's basketball career blocks leaders
- List of NCAA Division I men's basketball season blocks leaders
