= 2012–13 Euroleague Quarterfinals =

Results for the Quarterfinals of the 2012–13 Euroleague basketball tournament.

The quarterfinals were played from 9 to 26 of April, 2013. Team #1 (i.e., the group winner in each series) hosted Games 1 and 2, plus Game 5 if necessary. Team #2 hosted Game 3, plus Game 4 if necessary.

All times given below are in Central European Time.

== Quarterfinals ==
Team 1	Agg.	Team 2	1st leg	2nd leg	3rd leg	4th leg	5th leg
CSKA Moscow (Russia)	3–1	(Spain) Laboral Kutxa	89–78	90–68	72–93	94–85	
Olympiacos (Greece)	3–2	(Turkey) Anadolu Efes	67–62	71–53	72–83	73–74	82–72
FC Barcelona Regal (Spain)	3–2	(Greece) Panathinaikos	72–70	65–66	63–65	70–60	64–53
Real Madrid (Spain)	3–0	(Israel) Maccabi Tel Aviv	79–53	75–63	69–57		

* if necessary

== Game 1 ==
April 9, 2013
20:00

Report

FC Barcelona Regal (Spain)	72–70 (OT)	(Greece) Panathinaikos
Scoring by quarter: 11–21, 23–11, 11–19, 19–13, Overtime: 8–6
Pts: Navarro 14; Rebs: Tomić 12; Asts: Jasikevičius 5		Pts: Lasme, Gist 14; Rebs: Diamantidis, Tsartsaris 7 Asts: Ukić 7

Palau Blaugrana, Barcelona
Attendance: 6,195
Referees: Ilija Belosevic (SRB), Tolga Sahin (ITA), Joseph Bissang (FRA)

April 10, 2013
18:00

Report

CSKA Moscow (Russia)	89–78	(Spain) Laboral Kutxa
Scoring by quarter: 26-19, 24-16, 23-23, 16-20
Pts: Weems 19; Rebs: Khryapa 8 Asts: Khryapa 7		Pts: Causeur 17; Rebs: Nocioni 9 Asts: three players 4

CSKA Universal Sports Hall, Moscow
Attendance: 4,608
Referees: Fernando Rocha (POR), Milivoje Jovcic (SRB), Olegs Latisevs (LAT)

April 10, 2013
20:00

Report

Olympiacos (Greece)	67–62	(Turkey) Anadolu Efes
Scoring by quarter: 17-15, 16-17, 17-14, 17-16
Pts: Printezis 26; Rebs: Hines 9 Asts: Spanoulis 8		Pts: Gönlüm 17; Rebs: Erden 7 Asts: Gordon 6

Peace and Friendship Stadium, Piraeus
Attendance: 10,000
Referees: José Martín (ESP), Antonio Conde (ESP), Jakub Zamojski (POL)

April 10, 2013
20:45

Report

Real Madrid (Spain)	79–53	(Israel) Maccabi Tel Aviv
Scoring by quarter: 14-23, 24-4, 21-16, 20-10
Pts: Fernández 15; Rebs: Reyes 8 Asts: Rodríguez 10		Pts: James, Hickman 9 Rebs: James 6 Asts: Hickman 3

Palacio de Deportes, Madrid
Attendance: 8,076
Referees: Recep Ankarali (TUR), Matej Boltauzer (SLO), Robert Lottermoser (GER)

== Game 2 ==
April 11, 2013
20:45

Report

FC Barcelona Regal (Spain)	65–66	(Greece) Panathinaikos
Scoring by quarter: 11-16, 21-11, 18-21, 15-18
Pts: Navarro 20; Rebs: Tomić 7 Asts: Huertas 4		Pts: Gist 14; Rebs: Lasme, Gist 7 Asts: Ukić, Diamantidis 3

Palau Blaugrana, Barcelona
Attendance: 6,698
Referees: Borys Ryzhyk (UKR), Eddie Viator (FRA), Carmelo Paternico (ITA)

April 12, 2013
18:00

Report

CSKA Moscow (Russia)	90–68	(Spain) Laboral Kutxa
Scoring by quarter: 20–26, 24–11, 25–13, 21–18
Pts: Three players 16; Rebs: Khryapa 9 Asts: Teodosić 7		Pts: Lampe 19; Rebs: Lampe 6 Asts: Heurtel 6

CSKA Universal Sports Hall, Moscow
Attendance: 4,869
Referees: Sasa Pukl (SLO), Spiros Gkontas (GRE), Rustu Nuran (TUR)

April 12, 2013
20:45

Report

Olympiacos (Greece)	71–53	(Turkey) Anadolu Efes
Scoring by quarter: 14-16, 21-10, 17-14, 19-13
Pts: Spanoulis 15; Rebs: Antić, Papanikolaou 7 Asts: Spanoulis 8		Pts: Gönlüm 13; Rebs: Gönlüm 14; Asts: Farmar 5

Peace and Friendship Stadium, Piraeus
Attendance: 12,000
Referees: Guerrino Cerebuch (ITA), Dani Hierrezuelo (ESP), Luis Lopes (POR)

April 12, 2013
20:45

Report

Real Madrid (Spain)	75–63	(Israel) Maccabi Tel Aviv
Scoring by quarter: 18-13, 18-15, 20-18, 19-17
Pts: Llull 26; Rebs: Begić 9 Asts: Rodríguez 8		Pts: Logan 19; Rebs: James 7 Asts: Hickman 6

Palacio de Deportes, Madrid
Attendance: 10,793
Referees: Christos Christodoulou (GRE), Srdan Dozai (CRO), Milija Vojinovic (SRB)

== Game 3 ==
April 16, 2013
20:05

Report

Maccabi Tel Aviv (Israel)	57–69	(Spain) Real Madrid
Scoring by quarter: 10-16, 20-17, 14-19, 13-17
Pts: James 18; Rebs: Caner-Medley 7 Asts: Hickman 5		Pts: Carroll 16; Rebs: Mirotić 6 Asts: Fernández 4

Nokia Arena, Tel Aviv
Attendance: 10,728
Referees: Sasa Pukl (SLO), Milivoje Jovcic (SRB), Panagiotis Anastopoulos (GRE)

April 16, 2013
20:45

Report

Panathinaikos (Greece)	65–63	(Spain) FC Barcelona Regal
Scoring by quarter: 20-10, 18-19, 12-22, 15-12
Pts: Bramos 14; Rebs: Lasme 8 Asts: Schortsanitis 3		Pts: Navarro 17; Rebs: Tomić 9 Asts: Three players 2

O.A.C.A., Athens
Attendance: 17,800
Referees: Luigi Lamonica (ITA), Robert Lottermoser (GER), Damir Javor (SLO)

April 17, 2013
19:00

Report

Anadolu Efes (Turkey)	83–72	(Greece) Olympiacos
Scoring by quarter: 19−17, 18−12, 28−21, 18−22
Pts: Farmar 17; Rebs: Erden, Gordon 9 Asts: Gordon 7		Pts: Law 19; Rebs: Papanikolaou 7 Asts: Spanoulis 8

Abdi İpekçi Arena, Istanbul
Attendance: 10,982
Referees: Jose Ramon Garcia Ortiz (ESP), Matej Boltauzer (SLO), Eddie Viator (FRA)

April 17, 2013
20:45

Report

Laboral Kutxa (Spain)	93–72	(Russia) CSKA Moscow
Scoring by quarter: 15−14, 28−10, 27−15, 23−33
Pts: Heurtel 21; Rebs: Lampe 8 Asts: Cook, Causeur 3		Pts: Krstić 12; Rebs: Krstić 5 Asts: Ponkrashov 5

Fernando Buesa Arena, Vitoria-Gasteiz
Attendance: 12,089
Referees: Ilija Belosević (SRB), Sreten Radović (CRO), Elias Koromilas (GRE)

== Game 4 ==
April 18, 2013
20:45

Report

Panathinaikos (Greece)	60–70	(Spain) FC Barcelona Regal
Scoring by quarter: 10−20, 17−11, 11−20, 22−19
Pts: Bramos 15; Rebs: Lasme 12; Asts: Diamantidis 6		Pts: Navarro 17; Rebs: Huertas 6 Asts: Huertas 6

O.A.C.A., Athens
Attendance: 18,300
Referees: Borys Ryzhyk (UKR), Milivoje Jovcić (SRB), Matej Boltauzer (SLO)

April 19, 2013
19:00

Report

Anadolu Efes (Turkey)	74–73	(Greece) Olympiacos
Scoring by quarter: 12−20, 26−24, 18−14, 18−15
Pts: Farmar 15; Rebs: Erden 12; Asts: Three players 3		Pts: Law 15; Rebs: Papanikolaou 7 Asts: Spanoulis, Printezis 4

Abdi İpekçi Arena, Istanbul
Attendance: 11,356
Referees: Luigi Lamonica (ITA), Carmelo Paternico (ITA), Olegs Latisevs (LAT)

April 19, 2013
20:30

Report

Laboral Kutxa (Spain)	85–94	(Russia) CSKA Moscow
Scoring by quarter: 20−22, 14−14, 20−31, 31−27
Pts: Causeur 19; Rebs: Lampe 7 Asts: Bjelica 5		Pts: Three players 19; Rebs: Khryapa 12; Asts: Three players 4

Fernando Buesa Arena, Vitoria-Gasteiz
Attendance: 12,114
Referees: Christos Christodoulou (GRE), Recep Ankarali (TUR), Milija Vojinovic (SRB)

== Game 5 ==
April 25, 2013
21:00

Report

FC Barcelona Regal (Spain)	64–53	(Greece) Panathinaikos
Scoring by quarter: 28-14, 16-19, 7-10, 13-10
Pts: Navarro 15; Rebs: Ingles, Tomić 7 Asts: three players 2		Pts: Lasme 16; Rebs: Lasme 7 Asts: Diamantidis 3

Palau Blaugrana, Barcelona
Attendance: 7,585
Referees: Luigi Lamonica (ITA), Jakub Zamojski (POL), Olegs Latisevs (LAT)

April 26, 2013
20:45

Report

Olympiacos (Greece)	82–72	(Turkey) Anadolu Efes
Scoring by quarter: 21-23, 12-18, 21-14, 28-17
Pts: Spanoulis 19; Rebs: Printezis 7 Asts: Spanoulis 5		Pts: Gordon 14; Rebs: Erden 8 Asts: Gordon 5

Peace and Friendship Stadium, Piraeus
Attendance: 12,000
Referees: José Martín (ESP), Borys Ryzhyk (UKR), Fernando Rocha (POR)
