= Grady Livingston =

American college basketball player (c. 1972 – 2026)

Personal information
- Born: c. 1972
- Died: January 5, 2026
- Listed height: 7 ft 0 in (2.13 m)

Career information
- High school: Bishop O'Dowd (Oakland, California)
- College: Merritt College (1991–1993); Howard (1993–1995)
- NBA draft: 1995: undrafted
- Position: Center

Career highlights
- NCAA blocks leader (1994)

Grady Livingston (c. 1972 – 2026) is an American former college basketball player for Howard University who is best known for leading NCAA Division I in blocks as a junior in 1993–94. He stands 7 ft 0 in (2.13 m) tall and played the center position. In Livingston's junior year, he averaged 4.42 blocks per game over the span of 26 games to earn the honorary title of national blocked shots leader.

Livingston grew up in Oakland, California and attended Bishop O'Dowd High School from 1986 to 1990. He then attended Merritt College from 1991 to 1993, where he majored in Social and Behavioral Sciences. After he finished community college, he enrolled at Howard, which is located in Washington, D.C., and played basketball for the Bison. Although he was known for blocking shots, Livingston also became known for a fight he incited during a game against Delaware State on Thursday, February 24, 1994. He appeared to elbow an opposing player when attempting to box out to grab a rebound, which caused the Delaware State player to yank Livingston's uniform. As Livingston turned around, he punched the player, causing a "violent brawl" between the two teams. Six players were ejected, including Livingston, and he was suspended from playing in the next game.

Livingston finished his collegiate basketball career after the 1994–95 season in which he failed to repeat as the season blocks leader. He played on the National Basketball Association's New Jersey Nets pre-season team but was cut prior to the start of the 1995–96 regular season. Livingston never made it into the NBA, and today works as a group counselor in the Marin County, California Probation division.

== See also ==
- List of NCAA Division I men's basketball season blocks leaders
