= Deng Gai =

South Sudanese basketball player (born 1982)

Personal information
- Born: March 22, 1982 (age 44) Wau, Sudan (now South Sudan)
- Listed height: 6 ft 9 in (2.06 m)
- Listed weight: 250 lb (113 kg)

Career information
- High school: Milford Academy (Milford, Connecticut)
- College: Fairfield (2001–2005)
- NBA draft: 2005: undrafted
- Playing career: 2005–2011
- Position: Power forward
- Number: 35

Career history
- 2005: Philadelphia 76ers
- 2006: Dodge City Legend
- 2006–2007: Wilmington Sea Dawgs
- 2007: Albany Patroons
- 2007–2008: Śląsk Wrocław
- 2011: Palangos Naglis

Career highlights
- NCAA blocks leader (2005); 3× MAAC Defensive Player of the Year (2003–2005)
- Stats at NBA.com
- Stats at Basketball Reference

Deng Nathaniel Magany Gai (born March 22, 1982) is a South Sudanese former professional basketball player. A power forward, he briefly played in the National Basketball Association (NBA) and in several other leagues. Gai was the 2005 NCAA blocks leader.

== Early life ==
Gai fled from Sudan in 1999 as a refugee due to the civil war. He travelled by train and a crude boat over a three-day trek to Egypt. Gai arrived in the United States and settled in Fairfield, Connecticut.

== College basketball ==
After attending Milford Academy in Connecticut, Gai played college basketball at Fairfield University (also in the state), where he was a three-time MAAC Defensive Player of the Year and took the Stags to the MAAC semifinals in 2005. Gai graduated as number eight on the NCAA's all-time blocked shots list.

As a senior, Gai was named first team All-MAAC, leading the nation in blocks (5.5 bpg) while blocking 10 or more shots in three contests.

== Professional basketball ==
Gai declared for the NBA draft in 2004, but ultimately withdrew his name. He was signed as a free agent by the Philadelphia 76ers in 2005.

After playing in only two regular-season games for the team, Gai was waived in December 2005. He then briefly played for the USBL's Dodge City Legend and the ABA's Wilmington Sea Dawgs. Subsequently, Gai, who had been drafted in 2005 by the CBA's Albany Patroons (2nd round, 10th overall), played for the team in the USBL, leading it in blocks. At the end of the season, he was named to the league's All-Defensive Team.

In 2007–08, Gai represented Poland's Śląsk Wrocław, but the team folded after that season.

== Personal life ==
Gai has nine siblings. He is a cousin of fellow NBA player Luol Deng.

== See also ==
- List of NCAA Division I men's basketball players with 13 or more blocks in a game
- List of NCAA Division I men's basketball season blocks leaders
- List of NCAA Division I men's basketball career blocks leaders
