= List of NCAA Division I men's basketball season blocks leaders =

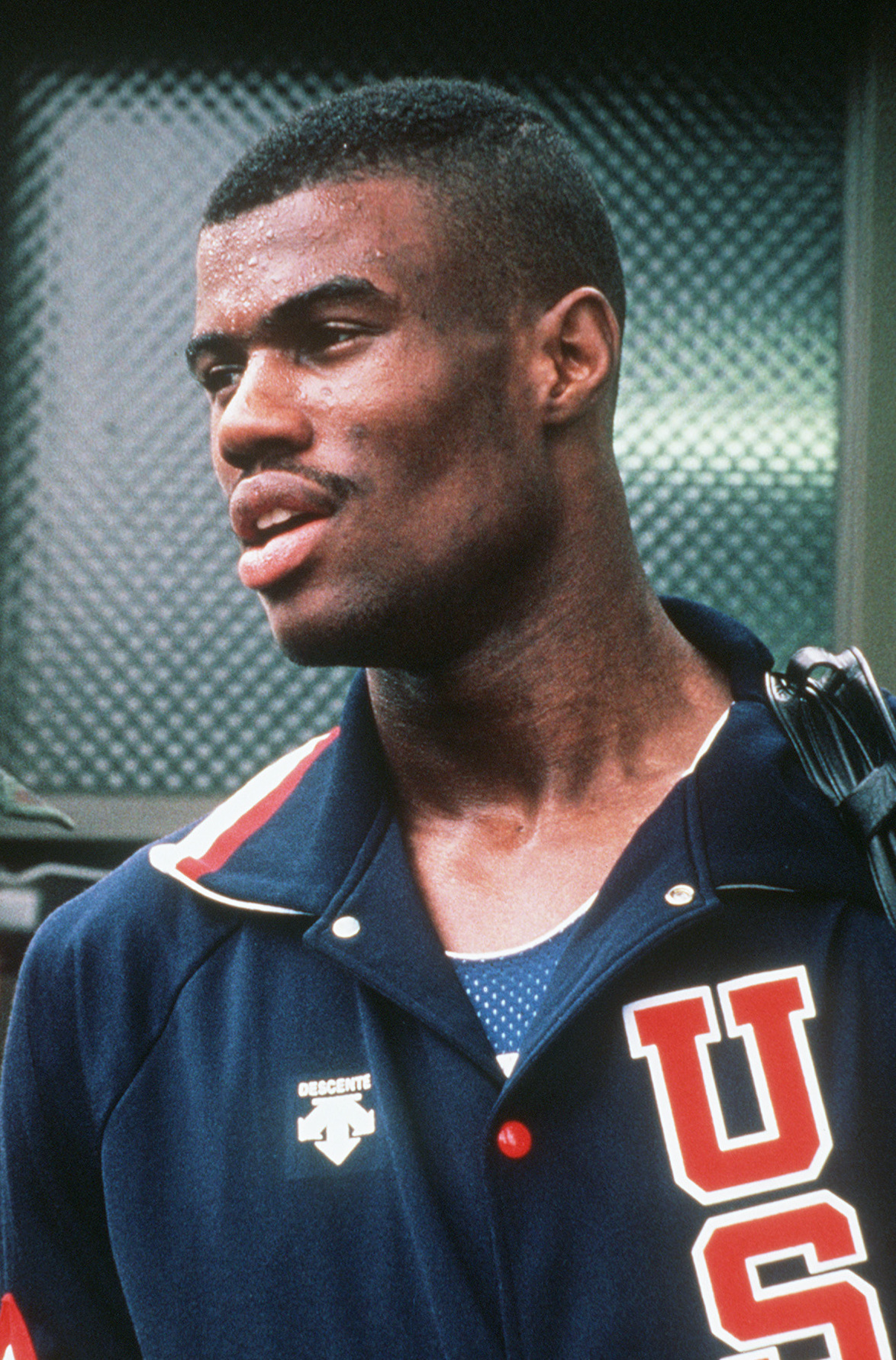
David Robinson recorded 207 blocks in 1985–86, the most for a single season in NCAA history.

In basketball, a block (short for blocked shot) occurs when a defender deflects or stops a field goal attempt without committing a foul. The National Collegiate Athletic Association's (NCAA) Division I block title is awarded to the player with the highest blocks per game average in a given season. The block title was first recognized in the 1985–86 season when statistics on blocks were first compiled by the NCAA.

David Robinson of Navy holds the all-time NCAA Division I record single-season total blocks record (207) which was set during 1985–86, coincidentally the first season that the NCAA kept track of blocked shots. Although Robinson holds the single-season record, it is Jarvis Varnado of Mississippi State who claims the all-time career blocked shots record (564). The highest single-season blocks per game (bpg) record is held by Northeastern's Shawn James, who averaged 6.53 blocks in 2005–06.

Five players have been two-time NCAA bpg leaders: David Robinson (1986, 1987), Keith Closs (1995, 1996), Tarvis Williams (1999, 2001), Jarvis Varnado (2008, 2009), and Jamarion Sharp (2022, 2023). Additionally, six freshmen have led Division I in blocks: Alonzo Mourning (1989), Shawn Bradley (1991), Keith Closs (1995), Hassan Whiteside (2010), Anthony Davis (2012), and Chris Obekpa (2013). Among all-time NCAA blocks leaders, only Robinson, Mourning, and Shaquille O'Neal are members of the Naismith Memorial Basketball Hall of Fame.

Keith Closs, the blocks leader in 1995 and 1996, only played college basketball for two seasons. He left the NCAA after only two years to pursue a career in professional basketball, thereby foregoing his final two seasons of eligibility under NCAA by-laws. Had he decided to stay at Central Connecticut, Closs could have potentially become the first player to lead Division I in blocks for not only three years, but possibly all four.

Ten players on this list were born outside the United States—Shawn Bradley in Germany (West Germany at the time of his birth), Adonal Foyle in Saint Vincent and the Grenadines, Wojciech Myrda in Poland, Deng Gai in what is now South Sudan (part of Sudan at the time of his birth), Chris Obekpa and Obinna Anochili-Killen in Nigeria, Jordan Bachynski in Canada, Vashil Fernandez in Jamaica, Liam Thomas in Australia, and Ajdin Penava in Bosnia and Herzegovina.

== Key ==
Pos.	G	F	C	BPG	Ref.
Position	Guard	Forward	Center	Blocks per game	References

Class (Cl.) key
Fr	Freshman	So	Sophomore	Jr	Junior	Sr	Senior	Gr	Graduate

^	Player still active in NCAA Division I
*	Elected to the Naismith Memorial Basketball Hall of Fame
Player (X)	Denotes the number of times the player had been the blocks leader up to and including that season

== Blocks leaders ==
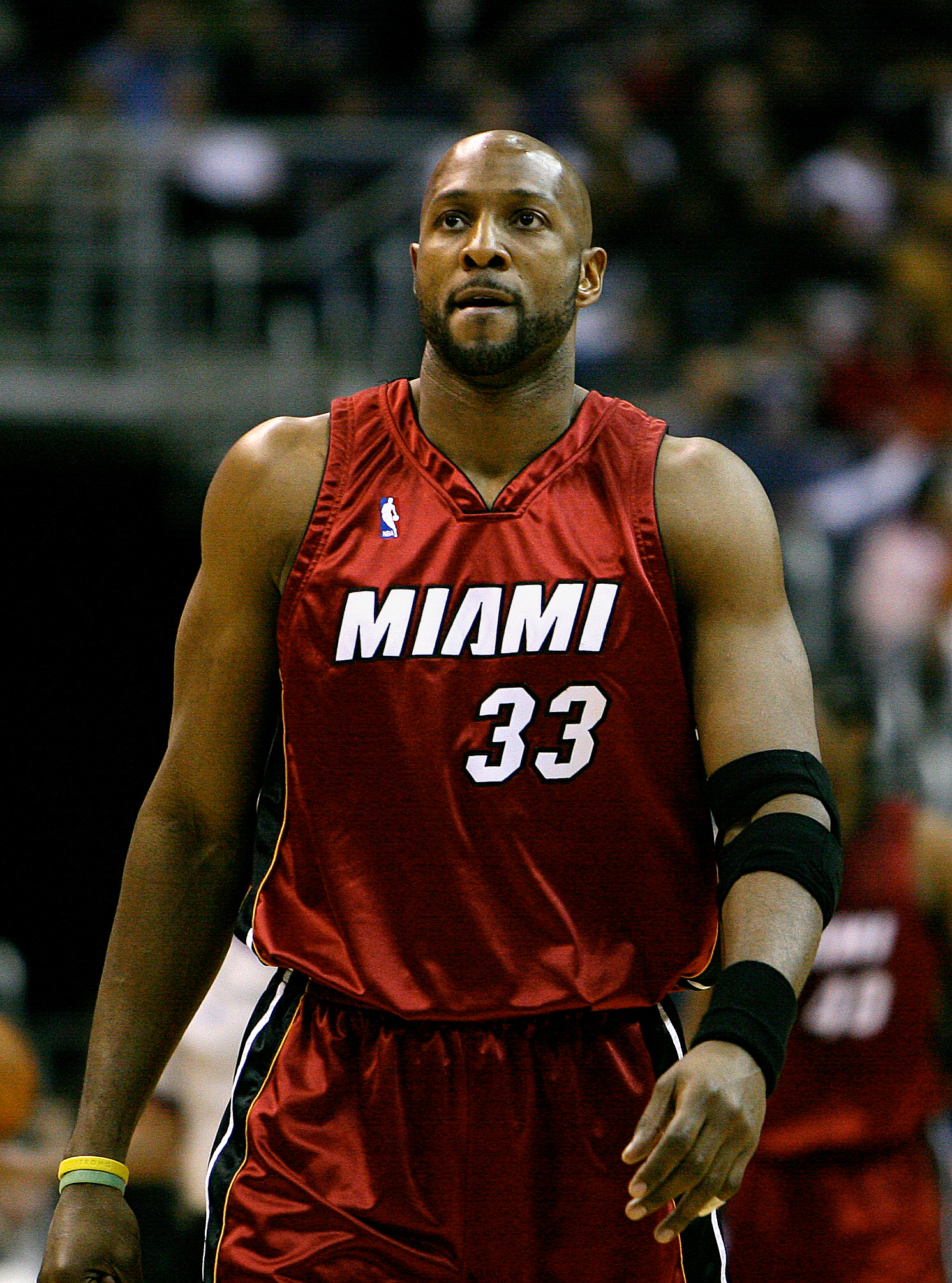
Alonzo Mourning was the first freshman to win the shot blocking title.

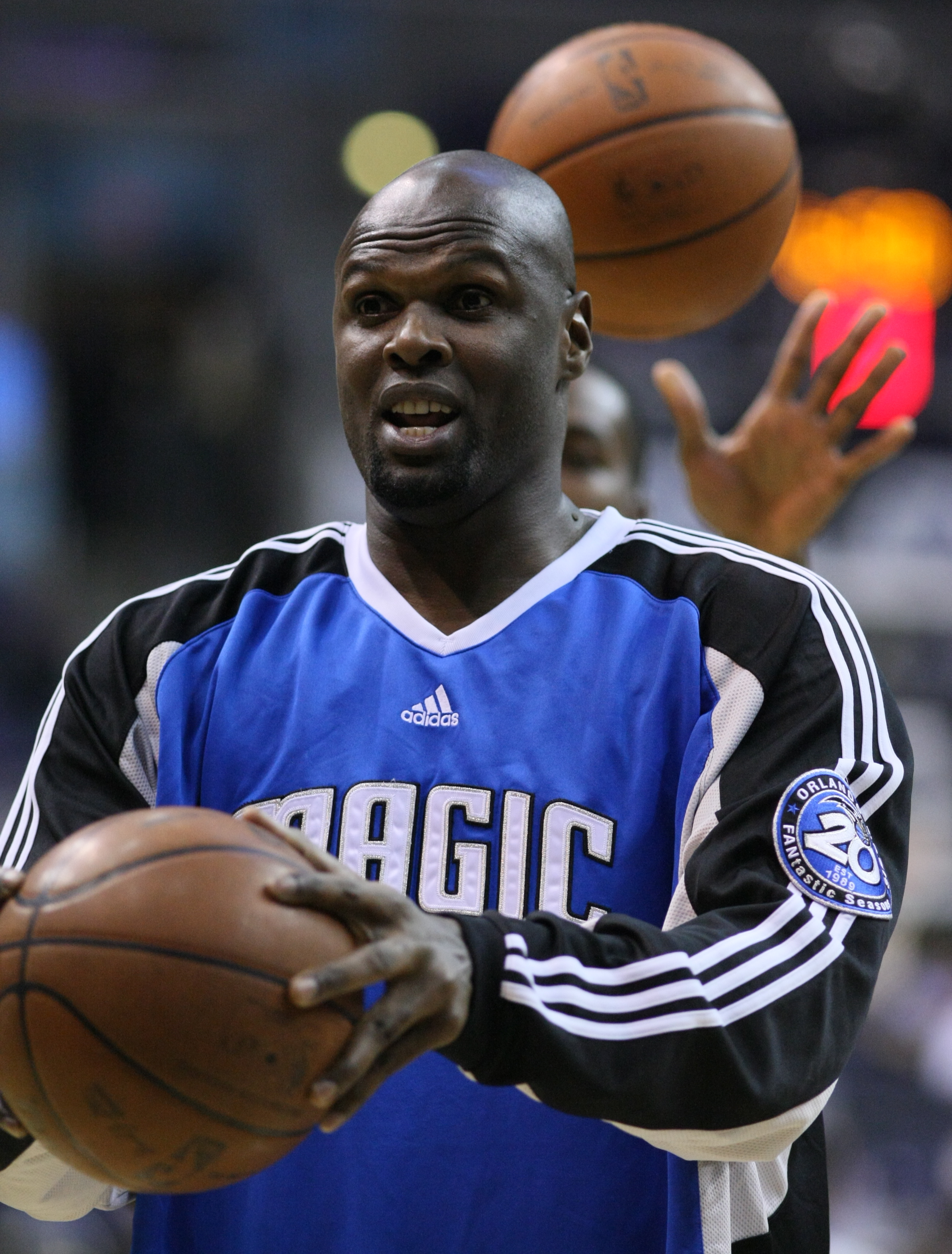
Adonal Foyle led the NCAA as a junior in 1997.

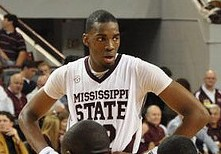
Jarvis Varnado led the NCAA in 2008 and 2009.

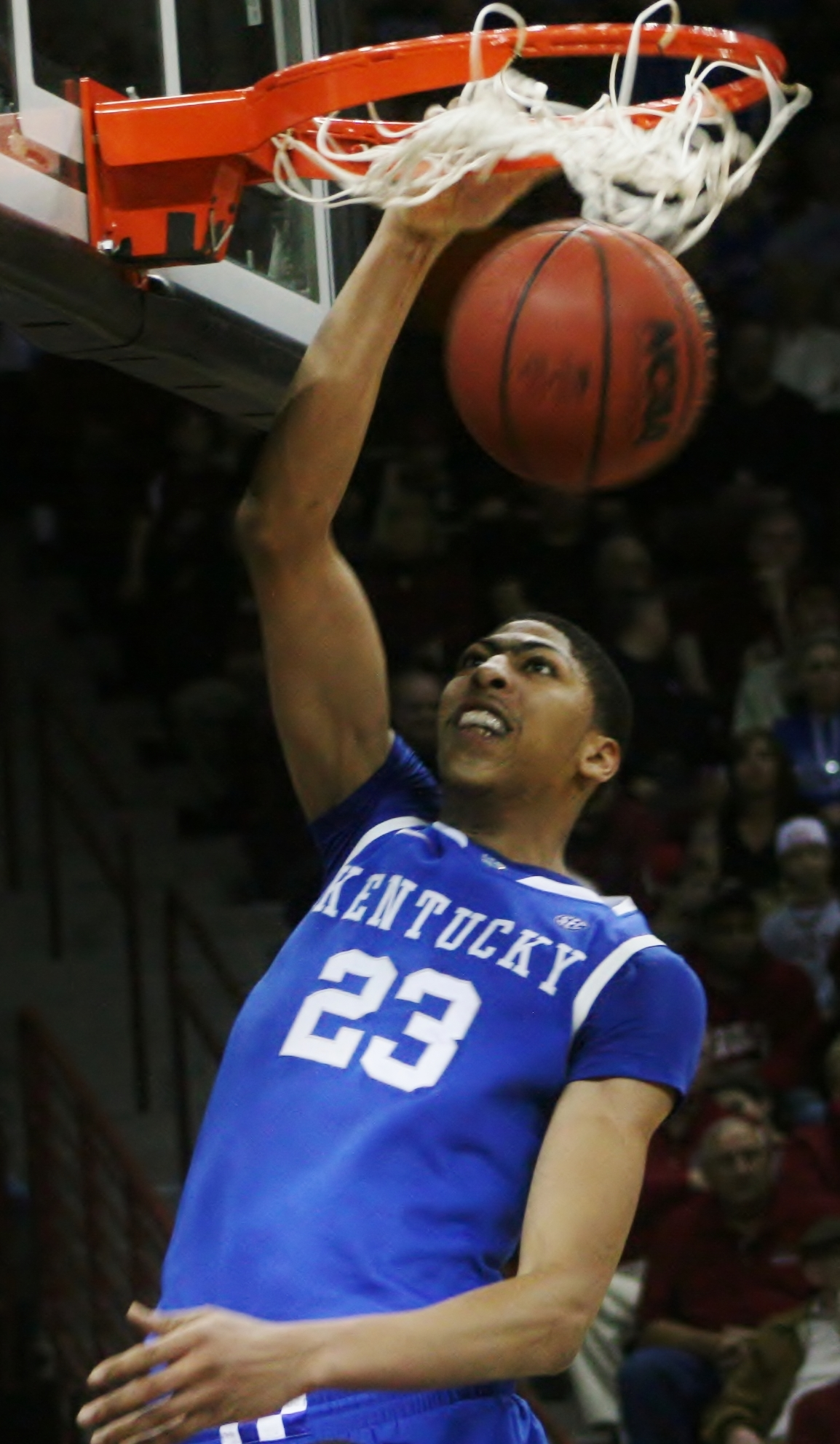
Anthony Davis led the country in 2012 en route to national Defensive Player of the Year honors.

All teams are listed with their current athletic brand names, which do not always reflect those used by a given program in a specific season.

Season	Player	Pos.	Cl.	Team	Games played	Blocks	BPG	Ref.
1985–86	David Robinson*	C	Jr	Navy	35	207	5.91	
1986–87	David Robinson* (2)	C	Sr	Navy	32	144	4.50	
1987–88	Rodney Blake	C	Sr	Saint Joseph's	29	116	4.00	
1988–89	Alonzo Mourning*	C	Fr	Georgetown	34	169	4.97	
1989–90	Kenny Green	F	Sr	Rhode Island	26	124	4.77	
1990–91	Shawn Bradley	C	Fr	BYU	34	177	5.21	
1991–92	Shaquille O'Neal*	C	Jr	LSU	30	157	5.23	
1992–93	Theo Ratliff	C/F	So	Wyoming	28	124	4.43	
1993–94	Grady Livingston	C	Jr	Howard	26	115	4.42	
1994–95	Keith Closs	C	Fr	Central Connecticut	26	139	5.35	
1995–96	Keith Closs (2)	C	So	Central Connecticut	28	178	6.36	
1996–97	Adonal Foyle	C	Jr	Colgate	28	180	6.43	
1997–98	Jerome James	C	Sr	Florida A&M	27	125	4.63	
1998–99	Tarvis Williams	C/F	So	Hampton	27	135	5.00	
1999–00	Ken Johnson	C	Jr	Ohio State	30	161	5.37	
2000–01	Tarvis Williams (2)	C/F	Sr	Hampton	32	147	4.59	
2001–02	Wojciech Myrda	C	Sr	Louisiana–Monroe	32	172	5.38	
2002–03	Emeka Okafor	C	So	Connecticut	33	156	4.73	
2003–04	Anwar Ferguson	C	Sr	Houston	27	111	4.11	
2004–05	Deng Gai	F	Sr	Fairfield	30	165	5.50	
2005–06	Shawn James	F	So	Northeastern	30	196	6.53	
2006–07	Mickell Gladness	C	Jr	Alabama A&M	30	188	6.27	
2007–08	Jarvis Varnado	F/C	So	Mississippi State	34	157	4.62	
2008–09	Jarvis Varnado (2)	F/C	Jr	Mississippi State	36	170	4.72	
2009–10	Hassan Whiteside	F/C	Fr	Marshall	34	182	5.35	
2010–11	William Mosley	C	Jr	Northwestern State	32	156	4.88	
2011–12	Anthony Davis	C	Fr	Kentucky	40	186	4.65	
2012–13	Chris Obekpa	C	Fr	St. John's	33	133	4.03	
2013–14	Jordan Bachynski	C	Sr	Arizona State	33	133	4.03	
2014–15	Jordan Mickey	F	So	LSU	31	112	3.61	
2015–16	Vashil Fernandez	C	Sr	Valparaiso	36	119	3.31	
2016–17	Liam Thomas	C	Sr	Nicholls	31	130	4.19	
2017–18	Ajdin Penava	F	Jr	Marshall	34	134	3.94	
2018–19	Brandon Gilbeck	C	Sr	Western Illinois	31	106	3.42	
2019–20	Osasumwen Osaghae	F	Sr	FIU	32	119	3.71	
2020–21	KC Ndefo	F	Jr	Saint Peter's	25	91	3.64	
2021–22	Jamarion Sharp	C	Jr	Western Kentucky	32	148	4.62	
2022–23	Jamarion Sharp (2)	C	Sr	Western Kentucky	32	131	4.09	
2023–24	Isaiah Cozart	C	Gr	Eastern Kentucky	30	116	3.87	
2024–25	Obinna Anochili-Killen	F	Gr	Marshall	32	102	3.19	
2025–26	Kyle Evans	F	Sr	UC Irvine	35	115	3.29	

== Multiple-time leaders ==
Rank	Player	Team(s)	Times leader	Years
1	Keith Closs	Central Connecticut	2	1994–95, 1995–96
1	David Robinson	Navy	2	1985–86, 1986–87
1	Jamarion Sharp	Western Kentucky	2	2021–22, 2022–23
1	Jarvis Varnado	Mississippi State	2	2007–08, 2008–09
1	Tarvis Williams	Hampton	2	1998–99, 2000–01
