= Theo Ratliff =

American basketball player (born 1973)

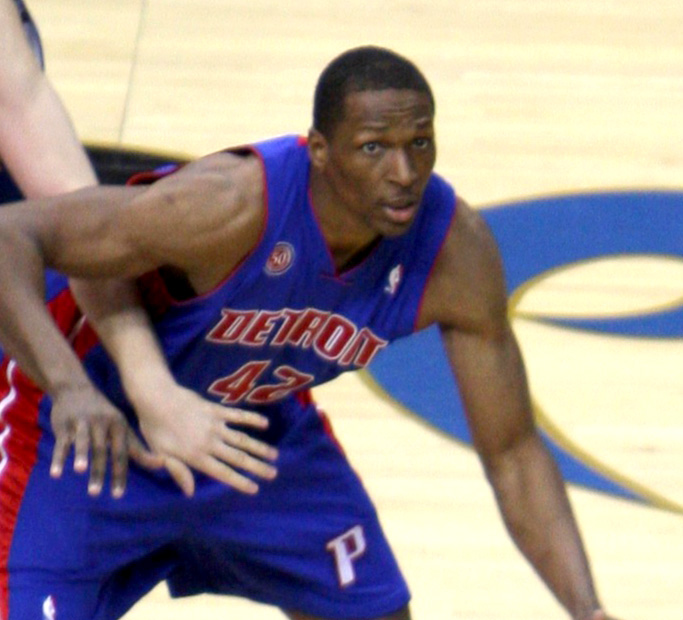
- Ratliff with the Detroit Pistons in 2008

Personal information
- Born: April 17, 1973 (age 53) Demopolis, Alabama, U.S.
- Listed height: 6 ft 10 in (2.08 m)
- Listed weight: 235 lb (107 kg)

Career information
- High school: Demopolis (Demopolis, Alabama)
- College: Wyoming (1991–1995)
- NBA draft: 1995: 1st round, 18th overall pick
- Drafted by: Detroit Pistons
- Playing career: 1995–2011
- Position: Center / power forward
- Number: 42, 50

Career history
- 1995–1997: Detroit Pistons
- 1997–2001: Philadelphia 76ers
- 2001–2004: Atlanta Hawks
- 2004–2006: Portland Trail Blazers
- 2006–2007: Boston Celtics
- 2007–2008: Minnesota Timberwolves
- 2008: Detroit Pistons
- 2008–2009: Philadelphia 76ers
- 2009–2010: San Antonio Spurs
- 2010: Charlotte Bobcats
- 2010–2011: Los Angeles Lakers

Career highlights
- As player: NBA All-Star (2001); 2× NBA All-Defensive Second Team (1999, 2004); 3× NBA blocks leader (2001, 2003, 2004); 2× First-team All-WAC (1994, 1995); NCAA blocks leader (1993); As owner: 2× WBA champion (2005, 2006)

Career statistics
- Points: 5,809 (7.2 ppg)
- Rebounds: 4,596 (5.7 rpg)
- Block: 1,968 (2.4 bpg)
- Stats at NBA.com
- Stats at Basketball Reference
Medals
Men's basketball
Representing United States
FIBA U21 World Championship
Gold medal – first place	1993 Valladolid	National team

Theophalus Curtis Ratliff (born April 17, 1973) is an American former professional basketball player who played 16 seasons in the National Basketball Association (NBA).

Born in Alabama, Ratliff played for and graduated from the University of Wyoming, before being selected by the Detroit Pistons in the 1995 NBA draft. He also played for the Philadelphia 76ers, the Atlanta Hawks, the Portland Trail Blazers, the Boston Celtics, the Minnesota Timberwolves, the Detroit Pistons, the San Antonio Spurs, the Charlotte Bobcats and the Los Angeles Lakers. Primarily a center, he was widely regarded as an excellent shot-blocker and led the league three times in blocks per game. As of 2026, he was ranked 21st all-time in career blocks.

== College career ==
Recruited by Benny Dees, Ratliff played for the Wyoming Cowboys beginning in 1991. He saw limited playing time his freshman year, playing with frontcourt upperclassmen Brian Rewers, Reggie Slater, and Tim Breaux. Following Slater and Breaux's graduations, Ratliff saw increased playing time his sophomore season, and would establish himself as Wyoming's starting center for his junior and senior year. During his senior year, Ratliff accumulated 144 blocks in 28 games, averaging 5.14 per game.

Ratliff finished his college career as the second leading shot blocker in NCAA Division I history behind only Alonzo Mourning. His 425 blocked shots in his career as a Cowboy still stands as the most in school history, as of 2024. Ratliff was inducted into the University of Wyoming Athletics Hall of Fame in 2005.

== NBA career ==
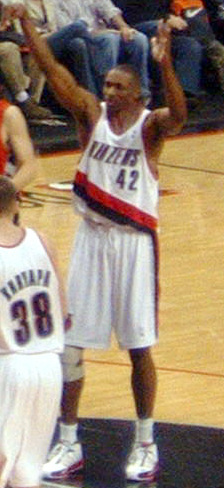
Ratliff with the Portland Trail Blazers in 2006

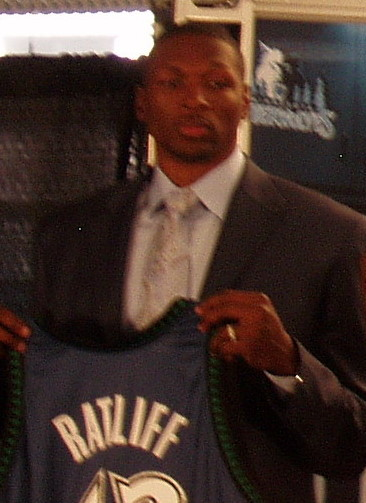
Ratliff after being traded to the Minnesota Timberwolves in 2007

Ratliff was selected with the 18th overall pick in the 1995 NBA draft by the Detroit Pistons, for whom he played 2½ seasons. In December 1997, Ratliff alongside teammate Aaron McKie, were traded to the Philadelphia 76ers in exchange for Eric Montross and Jerry Stackhouse. In Detroit, Ratliff had played mostly off the bench; Sixers first year coach Larry Brown immediately inserted Ratliff into his starting lineup and Ratliff's usage and production went up. On March 22, 1998, Ratliff scored a career-high 27 points during a 108–90 loss against the Boston Celtics.

In his first full season in Philadelphia, Ratliff posted 11.2 points, 8.1 rebounds and 3.0 blocks per game, while being named to the NBA All-Defensive Second Team. Alongside McKie, Eric Snow and Allen Iverson, they helped lead Philadelphia to the playoffs for the first time in eight years, where they would win the opening series against the Orlando Magic before falling to the Indiana Pacers in the second round of the playoffs.

The following season, Ratliff only played 57 games due to a stress fracture in his left ankle, but averaged 11.9 points, 7.6 rebounds and 3.0 blocks per game to help the Sixers back to the playoffs, where they would again lose to the Indiana Pacers in the second round.

Ratliff was voted to his first All-Star Game in 2001, averaging 12.4 points, 8.3 rebounds, and a league-leading 3.7 blocks per game. Ratliff however was injured just prior to the All Star game and unable to play, instead requiring season-ending surgery. On February 22, Ratliff was traded to the Atlanta Hawks with Toni Kukoč, Nazr Mohammed, and Pepe Sánchez for Roshown McLeod and Dikembe Mutombo.

Though a fan favorite in Philadelphia, Larry Brown decided to move forward with the trade once it was determined Ratliff would not be back in time for the playoffs. The 2000–01 Sixers would eventually make it to that season's NBA Finals after starting 36–14 with Ratliff and finishing 15–11 with Mutombo in his place.

Ratliff played just three games due to a hip injury the following season. Coming off back-to-back season ending injuries, Ratliff responded by averaging 8.7 points, 7.5 rebounds and a league-leading 3.2 blocks in 81 games during the 2002–03 season.

Midway through the 2003–04 season, he was dealt to the Portland Trail Blazers, along with Shareef Abdur-Rahim and Dan Dickau, for Rasheed Wallace and Wesley Person. Due to the timing of the trade and how far Atlanta and Portland were into their respective 82 game schedules, Ratliff would end up achieving an NBA rarity by playing 85 games in the season. He also posted 307 blocks for the year; as of 2023, this is the only season a player eclipsed 300 blocks for a year since Dikembe Mutombo in 1996. Despite being traded, this would represent Ratliff's best individual season; for the third time in four seasons he led the NBA in blocks, and for the second time in his career he was named to the NBA All-Defensive Second Team.

After the season, he signed a three-year contract extension with the Blazers. Ratliff missed games over the next two seasons dealing with nagging injuries, and eventually lost his starting job to Joel Przybilla.

In June 2006, the Boston Celtics acquired Ratliff along with Sebastian Telfair from the Portland Trail Blazers in exchange for the draft rights of Randy Foye, power forward–center Raef LaFrentz, and point guard Dan Dickau.

In July 2007, he was traded along with Gerald Green, Ryan Gomes, Al Jefferson, Sebastian Telfair, and draft picks, to the Minnesota Timberwolves for Kevin Garnett. In February 2008 Ratliff was waived by the Timberwolves, and he rejoined the Detroit Pistons in March. In Detroit, Ratliff returned to the playoffs for the first time since 2000, as the Pistons advanced to the Eastern Conference Finals.

Ratliff signed with the 76ers for 2008–09 season. Returning to Philadelphia now a veteran on the relatively young team, Ratliff was named team captain along Andre Miller and Andre Iguodala.

In the offseason he was signed by the San Antonio Spurs. In February 2010, he was traded to the Charlotte Bobcats for a projected second round draft pick in 2016. This reunited him with former Sixers, now Bobcats coach Larry Brown; the frontcourt rotation of Ratliff, Tyson Chandler and Boris Diaw helped the Bobcats to the number one ranked defense in the NBA, their first ever winning record, and first playoff appearance in team history.

Ratliff was signed by the Los Angeles Lakers on July 22, 2010, to a one-year deal.

Prior to the 2011–12 season, Ratliff announced he was retiring.

== Awards and honors ==
Ratliff won numerous awards during his career. The following are some of his collegiate achievements:

- First Team All-Western Athletic Conference (1994, 1995)
- Inducted into the University of Wyoming Athletics Hall of Fame (2005)

== Personal life and business ventures ==
From Demopolis, Alabama, Ratliff created The Theo Ratliff Center in Demopolis, Alabama which is a recreation center with a basketball court.

Ratliff was the owner of the Rome Gladiators basketball team.

In 2020, Ratliff wrote and published Theo The Hero, a children's book on how to deal with bullying.

In 2025, his twin sons Darius and Adonis committed to the University of Southern California to play basketball in 2026. His twins were also named to the 2026 McDonald's All-American Boys Game.

== Career statistics ==
Legend
GP	Games played	GS	Games started	MPG	Minutes per game
FG%	Field goal percentage	3P%	3-point field goal percentage	FT%	Free throw percentage
RPG	Rebounds per game	APG	Assists per game	SPG	Steals per game
BPG	Blocks per game	PPG	Points per game	**Bold**	Career high
*	Led the league

=== NBA ===
==== Regular season ====
Year	Team	GP	GS	MPG	FG%	3P%	FT%	RPG	APG	SPG	BPG	PPG
1995–96	Detroit	75	2	17.4	.557	.000	.708	4.0	.2	.2	1.5	4.5
1996–97	Detroit	76	38	17.0	.531	–	.698	3.4	.2	.4	1.5	5.8
1997–98	Detroit	24*	12	24.4	.514	–	.683	5.0	.6	.5	2.3	6.5
1997–98	Philadelphia	58*	55	32.1	.512	–	.706	7.3	.7	.7	3.5	11.2
1998–99	Philadelphia	50*	50*	32.5	.470	–	.725	8.1	.6	**.9**	3.0	11.2
1999–00	Philadelphia	57	56	31.5	.503	–	.771	7.6	.6	.6	3.0	11.9
2000–01	Philadelphia	50	50	**36.0**	.499	–	.760	**8.3**	**1.2**	.6	3.7*	**12.4**
2001–02	Atlanta	3	2	27.3	.500	–	.545	5.3	.3	.3	2.7	8.7
2002–03	Atlanta	81	81	31.1	.464	–	.720	7.5	.9	.7	3.2*	8.7
2003–04	Atlanta	**53***	**52***	31.1	.458	–	.653	7.2	1.0	.6	3.1*	8.3
2003–04	Portland	**32***	**31***	31.8	.540	–	.629	7.3	.6	.8	**4.4***	7.3
2004–05	Portland	63	45	27.5	.447	–	.692	5.3	.5	.4	2.5	4.8
2005–06	Portland	55	19	23.7	**.571**	–	.651	5.1	.5	.3	1.6	4.9
2006–07	Boston	2	2	22.0	.333	–	.750	3.5	.0	.5	1.5	2.5
2007–08	Minnesota	10	6	21.4	.511	.000	.680	3.9	.7	.3	1.9	6.3
2007–08	Detroit	16	3	13.9	.450	–	.667	3.1	.4	.3	1.1	3.0
2008–09	Philadelphia	46	0	12.6	.531	–	.600	2.8	.2	.4	1.0	1.9
2009–10	San Antonio	21	3	8.7	.444	–	.500	1.9	.4	.1	.9	1.6
2009–10	Charlotte	28	26	22.3	.466	–	**.783**	4.2	.6	.3	1.5	5.1
2010–11	L.A. Lakers	10	0	7.0	.167	–	.000	1.3	.3	.2	.5	.2
Career		810	533	25.5	.496	.000	.710	5.7	.6	.5	2.4	7.2

==== Playoffs ====
Year	Team	GP	GS	MPG	FG%	3P%	FT%	RPG	APG	SPG	BPG	PPG
1996	Detroit	1	0	4.0	–	–	–	.0	.0	.0	.0	.0
1997	Detroit	3	0	6.0	.750	–	.500	1.3	.3	.3	1.3	2.7
1999	Philadelphia	7	7	29.1	.465	–	.579	7.3	**.9**	.7	2.6	7.3
2000	Philadelphia	10	**10**	**37.4**	.475	–	**.723**	**7.9**	**.9**	**1.0**	**3.0**	**13.0**
2008	Detroit	**12**	0	10.9	.500	–	.500	2.3	.1	.1	.9	1.3
2009	Philadelphia	6	0	15.7	**.818**	–	.500	3.8	.0	.2	.7	3.3
2010	Charlotte	4	4	11.8	.375	–	.500	.8	.3	.5	.0	1.8
2011	L.A. Lakers	1	0	1.0	–	–	–	1.0	.0	.0	.0	.0
Career		44	21	19.8	.497	–	.643	4.3	.4	.5	1.5	5.3

=== College ===
*	Led NCAA Division I
*	Led Western Athletic Conference

Year	Team	GP	GS	MPG	FG%	3P%	FT%	RPG	APG	SPG	BPG	PPG
1991–92	Wyoming	27		11.0	.438	–	.583	2.0	.3	.3	1.6	1.8
1992–93	Wyoming	**28**	20	29.4	.538	.000	.517	6.2	.3	.5	**4.4***	9.2
1993–94	Wyoming	**28**	**28**	31.9	**.569***	.000	.649	**7.8**	1.0	**.9**	**4.1***	**15.4**
1994–95	Wyoming	**28**	**28**	**32.6**	.544	**.200**	.633	7.5	**1.1**	.6	**5.1***	14.4
Career		111	76	26.4	.547	.143	.608	5.9	.7	.6	3.8	10.3

== See also ==
- List of NBA career blocks leaders
- List of NBA annual blocks leaders
- List of NBA single-season blocks per game leaders
- List of NCAA Division I men's basketball career blocks leaders
- List of NCAA Division I men's basketball season blocks leaders
