= Mickell Gladness =

American basketball player

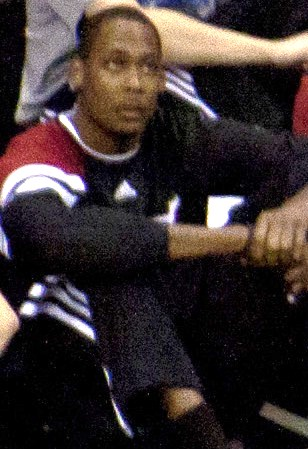
- Gladness as a member of the Miami Heat in December 2011

Personal information
- Born: July 26, 1986 (age 40) Jasper, Alabama, U.S.
- Listed height: 6 ft 11 in (2.11 m)
- Listed weight: 230 lb (104 kg)

Career information
- High school: Sylacauga (Sylacauga, Alabama)
- College: Lawson State CC (2004–2005); Alabama A&M (2005–2008)
- NBA draft: 2008: undrafted
- Playing career: 2008–2020
- Position: Center

Career history
- 2008–2009: Matrixx Magixx
- 2009–2011: Rio Grande Valley Vipers
- 2011: Dakota Wizards
- 2011–2012: Miami Heat
- 2012: Golden State Warriors
- 2012–2013: Santa Cruz Warriors
- 2013–2014: Reno Bighorns
- 2014: Jiangxi Xinye
- 2014–2015: Townsville Crocodiles
- 2015: Canterbury Rams
- 2015–2016: Maccabi Ashdod
- 2016: San Lorenzo de Almagro
- 2016–2017: BC Kalev
- 2017–2018: Bilbao Basket
- 2018: Ironi Nes Ziona
- 2018–2019: Pistoia Basket
- 2019: Benfica
- 2019: SeaHorses Mikawa
- 2019–2020: San-en NeoPhoenix
- 2020: Arka Gdynia

Career highlights
- NBA D-League champion (2010); Estonian League champion (2017); Estonian League All-Star (2017); United League blocks leader (2017); 2× NBA D-League All-Defensive Third Team (2013, 2014); NCAA Division I record for blocks in a game (16); NCAA blocks leader (2007); 2× First-team All-SWAC (2007, 2008); 2× SWAC Defensive Player of the Year (2007, 2008)
- Stats at NBA.com
- Stats at Basketball Reference

Mickell Jawaun Gladness (born July 26, 1986) is an American former professional basketball player. Gladness grew up in Alabama, played college basketball for Lawson State Community College and Alabama A&M University, and he began his professional career in the Netherlands after going undrafted in the 2008 NBA draft. In 2011, Gladness debuted in the National Basketball Association (NBA) with the Miami Heat.

== Early life ==
Gladness was born in Jasper, Alabama and grew up in Sylacauga where he attended Sylacauga High School from 2000 to 2004.

== College career ==
In his first and only season playing basketball for Lawson State Community College, Gladness averaged modest numbers with 3.1 points, 4.1 rebounds and 2.2 blocks per game. He transferred to Alabama A&M in 2005 where he played out the remaining three years of his college eligibility. At Alabama A&M, Gladness majored in business management.

Due to NCAA rules where a player does not have to sit out one full season if he or she transfers up a division (in this case, from a community college up to Division I) Gladness was able to begin playing immediately as a true sophomore in 2005–06. He appeared in 26 games and blocked 77 shots. It was in his junior season, however, that Gladness made a name for himself in college basketball. Playing in 30 games, Gladness led the nation in blocked shots per game at 6.3, with an adjusted-per-40 minutes rate of 7.9 bpg. He set an NCAA Division I single game record with 16 blocks against Texas Southern on February 24, 2007. No other player in Division I history has even recorded 15 blocks in a single game. Despite showing similar statistics otherwise, Gladness' blocks per game average dropped to 4.5 during his senior year. It is speculated that opposing players now knew of his shot-blocking ability and avoided getting too close for him to block their shots. Although he did not repeat as the NCAA season shots blocked leader, he did graduate having blocked 396 shots in only three seasons of Division I basketball, which was good enough to be in the all-time top 25 when he graduated. In his final two seasons, Gladness was a first-team All-Southwestern Athletic Conference selection.

== Professional career ==
Gladness went undrafted in the 2008 NBA draft. In July 2008, he signed a two-year deal with Matrixx Magixx of the Dutch Basketball League. In 2009, he opted out of the second year of his two-year contract with Matrixx.

In November 2009, Gladness was acquired by the Rio Grande Valley Vipers of the NBA Development League where he went on to help the team win the 2010 D-League championship. He subsequently joined Miami Heat for the 2010 NBA Summer League and on September 27, 2010, he signed with the Heat. However, he was later waived on October 11, 2010, and on October 30, he was reacquired by the Vipers. On January 24, 2011, he was waived by the Vipers. Five days later, he was acquired by the Dakota Wizards, only to be waived by the team on March 19, 2011.

In November 2011, Gladness was reacquired by the Dakota Wizards. On December 9, 2011, he signed with the Miami Heat and went on to make his NBA debut on December 25 against Dallas. On February 7, 2012, he was waived by the Heat, only to re-sign with the team on February 11 to a 10-day contract. On February 28, he signed a second 10-day contract with the Heat, but after that expired, he parted ways with the Heat after appearing in just eight games.

On March 22, 2012, Gladness signed a 10-day contract with the Golden State Warriors. On April 1, 2012, he signed with the Warriors for the rest of the 2011–12 season. Gladness started the final seven games of the regular season for the Warriors, recording a season-best game on April 26 in the season finale against San Antonio with 14 points and 9 rebounds.

On September 7, 2012, Gladness re-signed with the Miami Heat. However, he was later waived again on October 21, 2012. On November 28, 2012, he was acquired by the Santa Cruz Warriors.

In September 2013, Gladness signed with the Orlando Magic. However, he was waived by the Magic on October 25, 2013. After returning to Santa Cruz on December 9, 2013, he was traded the following day to the Reno Bighorns. Following the 2013–14 D-League season, he joined Jiangxi Xinye of the Chinese NBL.

On June 12, 2014, Gladness signed with the Townsville Crocodiles for the 2014–15 NBL season. In 27 games for the Crocodiles, he averaged 9.1 points, 7.7 rebounds and a league-leading 2.2 blocks per game.

On February 9, 2015, Gladness signed with the Canterbury Rams for the 2015 New Zealand NBL season. In 18 games for the Rams, he averaged 11.1 points, 11.3 rebounds and a league-leading 2.3 blocks per game.

In September 2015, Gladness signed with Maccabi Ashdod of the Israeli Basketball Premier League. He left the team in March 2016 after appearing in 21 games. Later that month, he joined San Lorenzo de Almagro of Argentina, but his stint lasted just three games.

On May 6, 2016, Gladness joined NBL All-Australian side in China to provide some additional height and defensive play in the three-game series against the Chinese national team.

On September 16, 2016, Gladness signed with Estonian club Kalev/Cramo. That season, Gladness led the VTB League in blocks with 1.5 per game and helped Kalev/Cramo win the 2017 Estonian League Championship.

On September 19, 2017, Gladness signed with Spanish club Bilbao Basket. In the 42 games played for Bilbao, he averaged 5.8 points and 4.2 rebounds per game.

On September 10, 2018, Gladness returned to Israel for a second stint, signing a one-month contract with Ironi Nes Ziona as an injury cover for Gerald Lee. On September 26, 2018, Gladness recorded a season-high 22 points, shooting 9-of-12 from the field, along with seven rebounds and three blocks in a 100–76 win over the Södertälje Kings. On October 5, 2018, Gladness signed a one-month contract extension with Nes Ziona after impressing during their first games in the FIBA Europe Cup Qualifying rounds.

On November 14, 2018, Gladness parted ways with Nes Ziona to join the Italian team Pistoia Basket. In 10 games played for Pistoia, he averaged 6.7 points, 4.5 rebounds and 1.2 blocks per game.

On February 27, 2019, Gladness joined Portuguese team Benfica for the rest of the season.

On December 8, 2019, he signed with San-en NeoPhoenix of the B.League.

On February 22, 2020, he signed with Arka Gdynia of the Polish Basketball League (PLK).

== Career statistics ==
Legend
GP	Games played	GS	Games started	MPG	Minutes per game
FG%	Field goal percentage	3P%	3-point field goal percentage	FT%	Free throw percentage
RPG	Rebounds per game	APG	Assists per game	SPG	Steals per game
BPG	Blocks per game	PPG	Points per game	**Bold**	Career high

=== NBA ===
==== Regular season ====
Year	Team	GP	GS	MPG	FG%	3P%	FT%	RPG	APG	SPG	BPG	PPG
2011–12	Miami	8	0	3.5	.333	.000	.000	1.4	**.3**	.1	.1	.3
2011–12	Golden State	**18**	**7**	**12.4**	**.429**	.000	**.500**	**2.6**	.2	**.2**	**1.1**	**3.0**
Career		26	7	9.7	.424	.000	.500	2.2	.2	.2	.8	2.2

=== NBL ===
==== Regular season ====
Year	Team	GP	GS	MPG	FG%	3P%	FT%	RPG	APG	SPG	BPG	PPG
2014–15	Townsville	27	27	25.1	.531	.000	.506	7.7	.4	.3	2.2	9.1
Career		27	27	25.1	.531	.000	.506	7.7	.4	.3	2.2	9.1

== Personal life ==
Gladness and his wife Adriana have two sons.

== See also ==
- List of NCAA Division I men's basketball players with 13 or more blocks in a game
- List of NCAA Division I men's basketball season blocks leaders
- List of NCAA Division I men's basketball career blocks leaders
