= Democracy Matters =

American non-profit student organization

- Founder: Adonal Foyle
- Established: 2001
- Focus: Pro-democracy, campaign finance reform
- President: Joan Mandle
- Slogan: "Change Elections, Change America"; "Get Money Out. Get People In"
- Website: www.democracymatters.org

For the Irish Campaign group Democracy Matters, see Democracy Matters (Ireland).

Democracy Matters is an American non-profit, non-partisan grassroots student political organization that is dedicated to deepening democracy. The organization's mission is to strengthen democracy by: (1) training young people how to be effective grassroots organizers and advocates; and (2) supporting public financing of election campaigns (“fair elections”) and other pro-democracy and campaign finance related reforms. Democracy Matters believes that it is imperative to reduce the overwhelming influence of big private and corporate money in elections and necessary to empower ordinary people—regardless of race, gender, and/or socio-economic status—to be able to participate meaningfully in the electoral and political process. Democracy Matters is also a part of the Declaration for American Democracy coalition.

== Origins ==
Wanting to give back after having been fortunate enough to play in the NBA, former 13-year veteran NBA player and Colgate alumnus Adonal Foyle, with the assistance of his adoptive parents Jay Mandle (professor of economics at Colgate) and Joan Mandle (associate professor of sociology, anthropology and women's studies at Colgate), created Democracy Matters in 2001. Colgate University served as the test for the first Democracy Matters chapter, and after a successful first year, multiple other chapters were established across the country. Among the oldest chapters are those at Vassar College, Brown University, Syracuse University, and St. Lawrence University.

== Structure of organization ==
Democracy Matters focuses on a bottom-up approach to political change. The organization seeks to empower and activate college students to lead the fight for campaign finance reform. Towards this end, Democracy Matters offers an internship program. When a student is selected as an intern, Democracy Matters offers individually-crafted training in political organizing, theory, and communication. Once students have undergone preliminary training, they sets forth to create (or maintain if already existence) a Democracy Matters chapter at their university. In this function, they oversee groups of other student activists committed to getting big money out of politics. Throughout its existence, Democracy Matters has worked with more than 800 interns and brought thousands of other affiliated students into the campaign finance fight.

Democracy Matters chapters are diverse in terms of race, gender, and political orientation. As such, there is no single programming curriculum for DM chapters. Students are encouraged to be creative and innovative with their campaigns and to develop their own style of political organizing. Among the many tactics used are: organizing movie screenings, bringing in well known lecturers, facilitating educational panels, and actively writing legislation and lobbying for reform on local and state levels. Students often partner with local community groups, statewide and national groups, and politicians to educate other citizens and actively promote legislation. Democracy Matters has also traditionally been geographically diverse, having had university chapters across the country.

== Raising awareness ==
Democracy Matters members raise awareness and educate others on their campuses and in nearby communities by organizing campaigns that link the problems of the current campaign finance system to other important issues such as the environment, civil rights, foreign policy, and rising college tuition. Democracy Matters and its students aim to show that the issue of campaign finance is an interdisciplinary one, which impacts all people interested in social justice issues.

Democracy Matters' official position in terms of how to improve the US campaign finance system is through the creation of an opt-in public financing system for national and statewide campaigns. Public financing of election campaigns, similar to the successful state systems in Maine, Arizona and Connecticut also known as "Voter/Citizen-Owned Elections", or "Fair Elections" provide an alternative for candidates to be publicly funded if they refuse to accept private donations from individuals or groups. This allows ordinary citizens, who lack the fiscal means, to run for office. Once elected, these publicly financed politicians are accountable to their constituents rather than to campaign contributors. Furthermore, they can use their time working on issues important to the people they represent rather than spending many hours each day on the phone "dialing for dollars" or attending fundraisers. In this respect, Democracy Matters has been very active in the fight for public financing of elections in New York state.

== Restore Democracy Fellowship ==
In the summer of 2015, Democracy Matters started a new program entitled "Restore Democracy" focused on making campaign finance an issue in the 2016 presidential elections. The organization funded a handful of summer interns to travel to the first two primary states, Iowa and New Hampshire. These interns were tasked with attending presidential candidates' events to ask them questions about where they stood on the issue of public financing and campaign finance reform more broadly; building new chapters at large universities in the respective states to create pressure once the school year began; and creating coalitions with local leaders towards the end of building student-adult groups for reform. The organization also attempted to get presidential candidates to sign the "Restore Democracy" pledge card, which read "I support restoring democracy by publicly financing elections and taking big money out of politics.”

During the course of this program, the group became the first organization to get Democratic candidate Hillary Clinton on the record supporting public financing of elections. The organization also got Republican Donald Trump on record saying public financing of elections was "fine". On August 3, Democratic candidate Bernie Sanders, who had previously declared his support for public financing, recorded a video endorsing the work that Democracy Matters was doing and reiterated the need for campaign finance reform.

By summer's end, Democracy Matters got both Bernie Sanders and Martin O'Malley to sign their "Restore Democracy" pledge. The fellowship program successfully established over a dozen chapters in both New Hampshire and Iowa.

== Publications ==
Democracy Matters publishes two monthly columns. The first, eNews, highlights the organization's most active student chapters and details recent events in the world of campaign finance. The second, Money on my Mind, written by Jay Mandle, links various political problems to big money in politics. Joan and Jay Mandle have also published a book, Change Elections, Change America, which chronicles the history of Democracy Matters and explains the pleasures and difficulties of running a non-profit political organization centered around social justice.

== Reception ==
Since founding Democracy Matters, Foyle has received multiple awards for his commitment to lasting social change. The NBA recognized Foyle for his commitment to democracy with nationally televised presentations of their "Community Assist Award". The Greenlining Institute presented him with their prestigious Change Agent Award for his commitment to campaign finance reform. Foyle also received the city of San Francisco's Sports Hero Award as well as many other awards and commendations for his work increasing the civic engagement of young people.

Foyle's commitment to Democracy Matters has also been widely hailed in the press, including in The New York Times, Sports Illustrated, USA Today, The Nation, Congressional Quarterly, Mother Jones, ESPN Magazine, and the Chicago Tribune Magazine, as well as in numerous local newspapers.

Foyle has since remained passionate about activating young people to be civically and politically engaged. In an op-ed piece, Foyle recounted the tremendous energy and creativity Democracy Matters students have brought to the work of deepening democracy.
