= Liam Thomas =

Australian basketball player (born 1994)

Personal information
- Born: 20 July 1994 (age 32) Kogarah, New South Wales
- Listed height: 7 ft 0 in (2.13 m)
- Listed weight: 200 lb (91 kg)

Career information
- High school: Central Private (Central, Louisiana)
- College: Nicholls (2013–2017)
- NBA draft: 2017: undrafted
- Playing career: 2017–2020
- Position: Power forward

Career history
- 2017: AV Ohrid
- 2019: Diamond Valley Eagles
- 2019–2020: Sutherland Sharks

Career highlights
- NCAA blocks leader (2017); Third-team All-Southland (2017); Southland Defensive Player of the Year (2017); 2× Southland All-Defensive Team (2016, 2017)

Liam Robert Thomas (born 20 July 1994) is an Australian former professional basketball player. He played college basketball for Nicholls State.

== Early life ==
Thomas played basketball for Central Private School in Central, Louisiana. As a senior, he averaged 14.1 points, 10.5 rebounds and 9.1 blocks per game. Thomas recorded 10 points, eight rebounds and eight blocks to lead his team to its first ever Mississippi Association of Independent Schools title.

== College career ==
Thomas was a four-year college basketball starter at Nicholls State. His coach J. P. Piper wanted to redshirt him for his first year, but Thomas did not agree with the idea. Thomas posted 8.8 points, 5.2 rebounds, and 2.5 blocks per game as a junior. As a junior, Thomas blocked 85 shots, a single-season school record, and became his program's all-time leader in blocks. In his senior season, he led the NCAA Division I with 4.19 blocks per game and 130 blocks, while averaging 7.8 points and 6.4 rebounds per game. Thomas was named Southland Defensive Player of the Year and Third Team All-Southland. He left with the third-most blocks in Southland history.

== Professional career ==
After going undrafted in the 2017 NBA draft, Thomas signed with AV Ohrid of the Macedonian First League and ABA League Second Division. On 28 November 2017, he was released by the club. In the 2018–19 season, Thomas joined the Sydney Kings of the Australian National Basketball League as a development player. He signed with the Diamond Valley Eagles of the semi-professional NBL1 on 22 February 2019. For his next season, Thomas played for the Sutherland Sharks of the semi-professional Waratah League.
