= Ken Johnson (basketball, born 1978) =

American basketball player

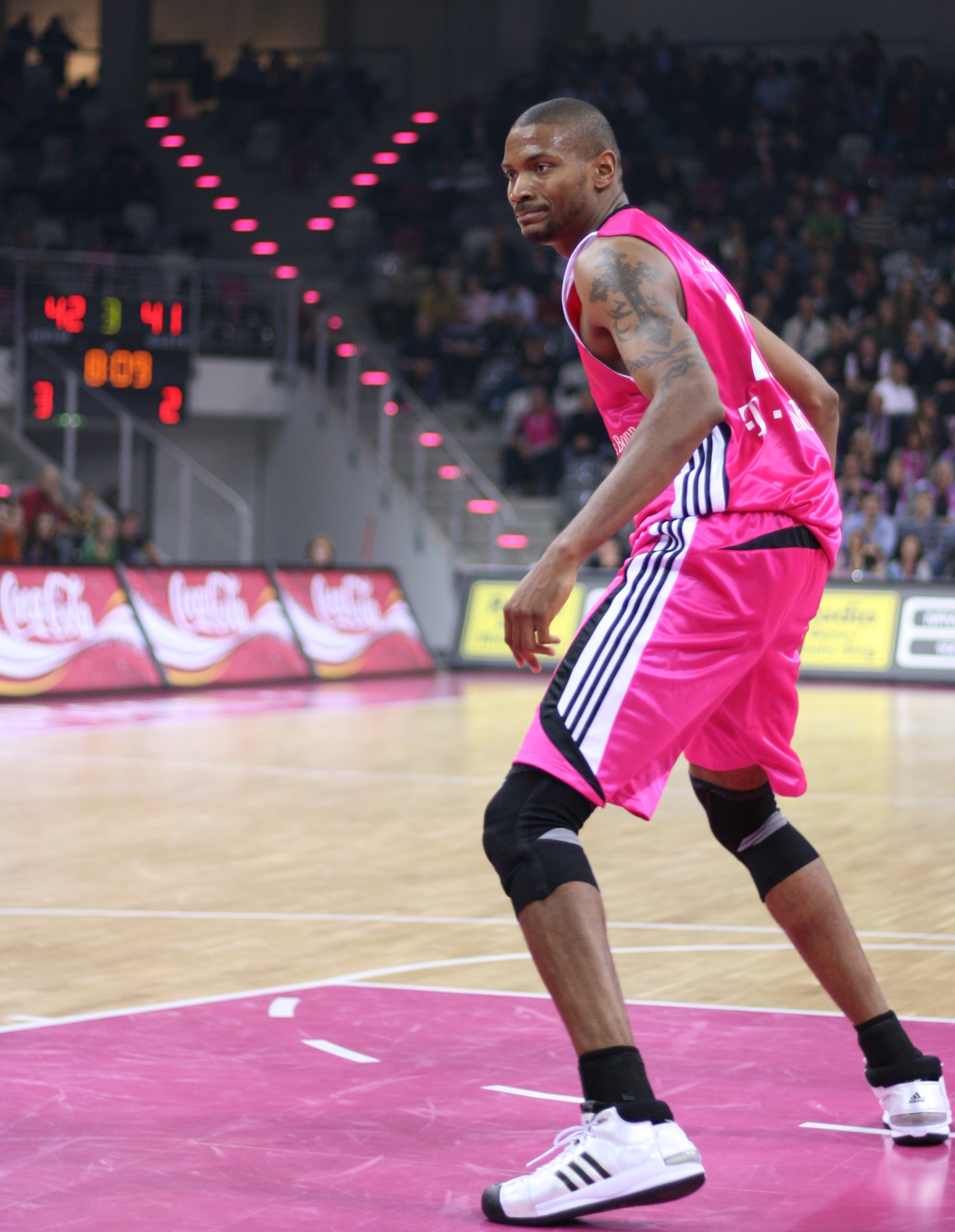
- Johnson with Telekom Baskets Bonn in 2008

Personal information
- Born: February 1, 1978 (age 48) Detroit, Michigan, U.S.
- Listed height: 6 ft 11 in (2.11 m)
- Listed weight: 240 lb (109 kg)

Career information
- High school: Henry Ford (Detroit, Michigan)
- College: Ohio State (1997–2001)
- NBA draft: 2001: 2nd round, 49th overall pick
- Drafted by: Miami Heat
- Playing career: 2001–2010
- Position: Center
- Number: 54

Career history
- 2001: Scandone Avellino
- 2001–2002: Dakota Wizards
- 2002–2003: Miami Heat
- 2003–2004: Huntsville Flight
- 2004–2005: Bourg-en-Bresse
- 2005–2006: Albuquerque Thunderbirds
- 2006: Busan Magic Wings
- 2006–2007: Yunnan Bulls
- 2007: Ford Burgos
- 2007–2008: Fribourg Olympic
- 2008: Skyliners Frankfurt
- 2008–2009: Telekom Bonn
- 2009–2010: BC Kalev

Career highlights
- CBA champion (2002); CBA All-Defensive Team (2002); CBA All-Rookie Team (2002); First-team All–Big Ten (2001); NCAA blocks leader (2000)
- Stats at NBA.com
- Stats at Basketball Reference

Kenyata Allen Johnson (born February 1, 1978) is an American former professional basketball player. A 6-foot-11-inch (211 cm), 240 lb (110 kg) center, he played collegiately at Ohio State University. He played in the NBA, the Continental Basketball Association (CBA), and the NBA Development League. He also played in France, in Italy, in Germany with Telekom Baskets Bonn, in Estonia with BC Kalev/Cramo and in Spain with Ford Burgos.

Johnson was selected by the Miami Heat in the 2nd round of the 2001 NBA draft with the 48th pick overall. He played for the Dakota Wizards of the Continental Basketball Association (CBA) during the 2001–02 season and was selected to the CBA All-Defensive and All-Rookie Teams. He won a CBA championship with the Wizards in 2002. He played 16 games of one NBA season (2002–03), averaging 2.0 points and 2.0 rebounds per game. Johnson's final NBA game was on April 15, 2003, in a 103–99 win over the Toronto Raptors where he came off the bench playing for 33 minutes and recorded 8 points, 10 rebounds, 1 steal and 1 block.

He was the first overall selection in the 2003 NBA Development League Draft.

== See also ==
- List of NCAA Division I men's basketball career blocks leaders
- List of NCAA Division I men's basketball season blocks leaders
