= Rodney Blake (basketball) =

American basketball player (born 1966)

Personal information
- Born: December 31, 1966 (age 59)
- Listed height: 6 ft 8 in (2.03 m)
- Listed weight: 220 lb (100 kg)

Career information
- High school: Monsignor Bonner (Drexel Hill, Pennsylvania)
- College: Saint Joseph's (1984–1988)
- NBA draft: 1988: undrafted
- Playing career: 1988–2000
- Position: Center

Career highlights
- NCAA blocks leader (1988)

Rodney Blake (born December 31, 1966) is a retired American professional basketball player. He had a standout college career at Saint Joseph's between 1984 and 1988 before embarking on a career that would take him to the Continental Basketball Association as well as leagues in over half a dozen countries. A 6 ft 8 in (2.03 m), 220 lb. (100 kg) center, Blake led NCAA Division I in blocked shots during the 1986–87 season. He still remains one of the top shot blockers for a career in Division I history.

== Early life ==
Blake, originally from Sharon Hill, Pennsylvania, attended Monsignor Bonner High School in Drexel Hill, Pennsylvania. He made a reputation for himself playing basketball and was ranked one of the top 50 players in the country by the time he graduated in 1984. He had guided Monsignor Bonner to consecutive Catholic League titles as well. Many colleges recruited him, but Blake stayed at home and chose to attend Saint Joseph's for head coach Jim Boyle. Among other reasons, he chose Saint Joseph's because of the opportunity to get significant playing minutes as a freshman.

== College ==
As he expected, Blake contributed right away for the Hawks, amassing a then-school single season record 95 blocks and being named to the All-Atlantic 10 Conference Rookie Team. Known for his defense, he also possessed a soft touch around the rim and contributed on the offensive end as well. He guided the Hawks to a second round entry in the 1985 National Invitation Tournament. The following year, Blake broke his own record by recording 121 blocks. He was named to the A-10 Conference and Philadelphia Big 5 First Teams. Saint Joseph's also qualified for the 1986 NCAA Tournament and advance to the Round of 32. As his college career began to gain momentum, Blake started receiving national recognition, and by the time he was a senior he was named to the preseason John R. Wooden Award watchlist, an honor given to the players in the country who have the most realistic chances as being the national player of the year.

In 1987–88, Blake led all of Division I in blocked shots per game. Publications such as Sporting News, Street & Smith's and Game Plan honored him with All-American status. The USBWA and NABC also selected him to their All-District First Teams. At the time of his graduation, Blake's 419 career blocked shots were the most in NCAA history, a mark that has been since surpassed. This total still ranks in the top 25 all-time, however.

== Professional and later life ==
Despite a lauded career at Saint Joseph's, Blake went unselected in the 1988 NBA draft. Years later, he recalled how he underestimated the importance of performing well at a pre-draft camp: "Senior year when I went down to [a pre-draft camp in] Orlando, I didn't realize how great an opportunity it was...I didn't understand that I had to 'bring it' because so many NBA scouts were there to evaluate us." Blake got hurt in the second game of the camp and never got to showcase his talent. After individual workouts with the Chicago Bulls and Houston Rockets, neither of which resulted in a regular-season contract, he began playing in the Continental Basketball Association (CBA) with the Charleston Gunners. After a short while he moved to play in Italy for three months, then moved to Germany to continue playing as an expatriate. When that team went bankrupt, Blake moved back to the United States and re-joined the CBA for the Wichita Falls Texans.

With the Texans, he became a key player in helping to lead the team to the first professional basketball championship in the state of Texas' history. Even though the Texans finished second to the Tulsa Fast Breakers in the Western Division during the regular season, they went on a hot streak down the stretch into the playoffs. They defeated the Quad City Thunder, four games to three in a best-of-seven series, to take the 1991 CBA Championship.

Uncertain of the CBA's financial situation, Blake headed overseas once again. Over the next nine years, he had stints in Cyprus, Belgium, Finland, Switzerland, Argentina, and for the Chicago Rockers back in the CBA. In 2000, Blake decided to retire from professional basketball after 12 years. He now works as a math teacher in special education at John Bartram High School in Southwest Philadelphia. He and his wife Shelly have one daughter, Elizabeth.

== See also ==
- List of NCAA Division I men's basketball season blocks leaders
- List of NCAA Division I men's basketball career blocks leaders
