= Keith Closs =

American basketball player (born 1976)

Santiago Basket Titanes
- Title: Head coach
- League: LDC

Personal information
- Born: April 3, 1976 (age 50) Hartford, Connecticut, U.S.
- Listed height: 7 ft 3 in (2.21 m)
- Listed weight: 212 lb (96 kg)

Career information
- High school: Sierra Vista (Baldwin Park, California)
- College: Central Connecticut (1994–1996)
- NBA draft: 1997: undrafted
- Playing career: 1996–2012
- Position: Center
- Number: 33
- Coaching career: 2023–present

Career history

Playing
- 1996–1997: Norwich Neptunes
- 1997–2000: Los Angeles Clippers
- 2001, 2003: Pennsylvania Valley Dawgs
- 2004–2005: Rockford Lightning
- 2005: Gary Steelheads
- 2006–2007: Butte Daredevils
- 2007: Buffalo Silverbacks
- 2007–2008: Tulsa 66ers
- 2008: Yunnan Bulls
- 2012: Santa Barbara Breakers

Coaching
- 2023–present: Santiago Basket Titanes

Career highlights
- CBA blocks leader (2005); 2× NCAA blocks leader (1995, 1996)
- Stats at NBA.com
- Stats at Basketball Reference

Keith Mitchell Closs Jr. (born April 3, 1976) is an American professional basketball coach and former player who is the head coach for the Santiago Basket Titanes of the Laliga de Campeones (LDC). He played at the center position.

== College career ==
At 7 feet 3 inches (2.21 m) and 212 pounds (96 kg), Closs played collegiately at Central Connecticut State University, leading the nation in blocks his only two years in college, and still holding the NCAA Division I career record for blocks with 5.87 blocked shots per game.

== Professional career ==
=== Los Angeles Clippers (1997–2000) ===
After starting playing professionally in the Atlantic Basketball Association with the Norwich Neptunes, Closs moved to the Clippers in 1997. Having logged career highs in points, rebounds, assists and steals during 1999–2000, his NBA career abruptly ended, with a club record for most blocked shots per 48 minutes (4.7).

Closs played three seasons as a backup center for the National Basketball Association's Los Angeles Clippers from 1997 to 2000, averaging 3.9 points, 2.9 rebounds and 1.3 blocks per game during his spell.

=== Later career (2001–2008) ===
Closs played for the Pennsylvania Valley Dawgs of the USBL in the 2001 and 2003 seasons.

On December 11, 2004, Closs signed with the Rockford Lightning of the Continental Basketball Association (CBA). He averaged a league-high 4.4 blocks per game as well as 7.2 points and 7.0 rebounds per game with the Lightning. On February 1, 2005, Closs was released by the Lightning. He also played in the CBA with the Gary Steelheads during the 2004–05 season.

Closs played for the Butte Daredevils in the CBA during the 2006–07 season but was released after being arrested for public intoxication. He then joined the Buffalo Silverbacks of the American Basketball Association.

Closs was selected with the 11th pick in the 5th round of the 2007 NBA Development League draft by the Tulsa 66ers.

In December 2008, Closs signed with the Chinese league's Yunnan Bulls, and averaged 16.1 points, 11.9 rebounds and 5.9 blocked shots per game.

Closs played for the Santa Barbara Breakers of the West Coast Professional Basketball League in 2012.

== Coaching career ==
On July 21, 2023, Closs was announced as the head coach of the Santiago Basket Titanes in the Dominican Laliga de Campeones.

== Career statistics ==
Legend
GP	Games played	GS	Games started	MPG	Minutes per game
FG%	Field goal percentage	3P%	3-point field goal percentage	FT%	Free throw percentage
RPG	Rebounds per game	APG	Assists per game	SPG	Steals per game
BPG	Blocks per game	PPG	Points per game	**Bold**	Career high

=== NBA ===
==== Regular season ====
Year	Team	GP	GS	MPG	FG%	3P%	FT%	RPG	APG	SPG	BPG	PPG
1997–98	L.A. Clippers	**58**	1	12.8	.449	–	.597	2.9	.3	**.2**	**1.4**	4.0
1998–99	L.A. Clippers	15	0	5.8	**.522**	.000	**.800**	1.7	.0	**.2**	.6	2.1
1999–2000	L.A. Clippers	57	**6**	**14.4**	.487	.000	.590	**3.1**	**.4**	**.2**	1.3	**4.2**
Career		130	7	12.7	.471	.000	.606	2.9	.3	.2	1.3	3.9

== Personal life ==
Closs is the oldest of six children. His favorite book is Giant Steps by Kareem Abdul-Jabbar.

Closs admitted to being an alcoholic, even before joining the Clippers. The pressure of the NBA only led to more drinking and after three DUI offenses, he sought help in 2007. During a 2008 interview, he said he had turned his life around, having given up the addiction for good.

His father, Keith Mitchell Closs Sr. died on December 1, 2017, from a possible heart attack, according to Closs's Twitter account.

Closs also has a son, Keith M. Closs III, born January 21, 2000.

In August 2022, Closs became an assistant coach in the Turkish basketball league

Closs has the fifth lowest BMI of all players in NBA history.

== See also ==
- List of tallest players in National Basketball Association history
- List of NCAA Division I men's basketball players with 13 or more blocks in a game
- List of NCAA Division I men's basketball season blocks leaders
