= D'or Fischer =

American-Israeli basketball player

D'or Fischer ד'אור פישר
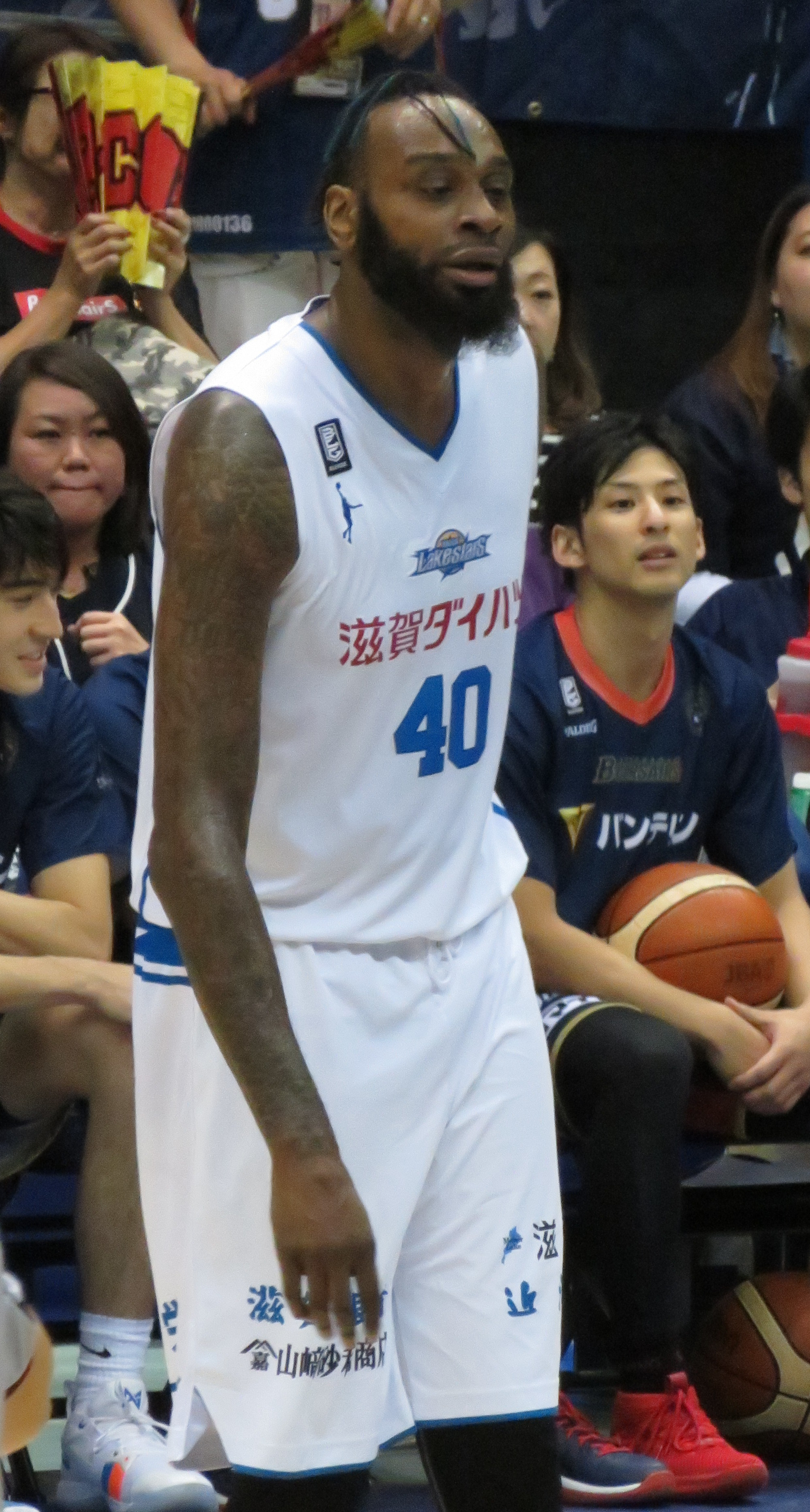
- Fischer with the Shiga Lakestars in 2018

Personal information
- Born: October 12, 1981 (age 45) Philadelphia, Pennsylvania, U.S.
- Listed height: 6 ft 11 in (2.11 m)
- Listed weight: 255 lb (116 kg)

Career information
- High school: Upper Darby (Drexel Hill, Pennsylvania)
- College: Northwestern State (2000–2002); West Virginia (2003–2005)
- NBA draft: 2005: undrafted
- Playing career: 2005–2020
- Position: Power forward / center

Career history
- 2005: Anwil Włocławek
- 2006: Roanoke Dazzle
- 2006–2007: EWE Baskets Oldenburg
- 2007–2008: Euphony Bree
- 2008–2010: Maccabi Tel Aviv
- 2010–2011: Real Madrid
- 2011–2012: Bilbao Basket
- 2012–2013: Donetsk
- 2013–2014: Brose Baskets
- 2014–2015: UNICS Kazan
- 2015–2016: Hapoel Jerusalem
- 2017: Capitanes de Arecibo
- 2017: Valmiera
- 2017–2019: Shiga Lakestars
- 2019: Bnei Herzliya
- 2019: Real Estelí
- 2019–2020: Elitzur Eito Ashkelon

Career highlights
- Belgian League MVP (2008); All-Bundesliga First Team (2014); Israeli League champion (2009); Israeli Cup winner (2010); EuroLeague blocks leader (2010)
- Stats at Basketball Reference

D'or Anthony Naheem Fischer (Hebrew: ד'אור אנתוני נהים פישר; born October 12, 1981) is an American-Israeli former professional basketball player. He last played for Elitzur Eito Ashkelon of the Israeli National League, and has also represented the senior Israeli national team. Standing at 2.11 m (6 ft 11 in), Fischer played at the power forward and center positions.

== College career ==
Fischer was born in Philadelphia, Pennsylvania, and did not play basketball as a student at Upper Darby High School.

Fischer played college basketball at Northwestern State University and also at West Virginia University with the West Virginia Mountaineers. As a sophomore, he was honorable mention all-Southland Conference selection after averaging 9.8 points, 7.2 rebounds, and 4.4 blocks per game, and totalling 133 blocks for the season, which was second-best in the nation. He broke the Northwestern State record for blocks in a game with 13, which was just one short of the NCAA record of 14 shared by four players.

== Professional career ==
After going undrafted at the 2005 NBA draft, Fischer signed his first professional contract with the Polish club Anwil Włocławek. However, he left Anwil after only three games. In January 2006, he signed with the Roanoke Dazzle of the NBA D-League.

For the 2006–07 season, he signed with EWE Baskets Oldenburg of the German Bundesliga. The following season, he played in Belgium with Euphony Bree.

On July 17, 2008, he signed a one-year contract with the Israeli club Maccabi Tel Aviv. On August 2, 2009, he re-signed with Maccabi for one more season.

On July 24, 2010, he signed a one-year contract with the Spanish club Real Madrid. On August 1, 2011, he moved to another Spanish club, Bilbao Basket, for the 2010–11 season.

On August 25, 2012, he signed with the Ukrainian club Donetsk.

On September 27, 2013, he signed with the NBA's Washington Wizards. However, he was later waived by the Wizards on October 16.

On November 24, 2013, he signed a one-year contract with the German club Brose Baskets. In April 2014, he was named to the German League's All-Basketball Bundesliga First Team.

On August 2, 2014, he signed a one-year deal with Russian club UNICS Kazan. In the 2014–15 EuroLeague season, he averaged 13.1 points per game, with a 75 percent field goal percentage from the field, and averaged 5.7 rebounds per game.

On July 15, 2015, Fischer signed a one-year contract with the Israeli club Hapoel Jerusalem. On March 25, 2016, he parted ways with Hapoel, after averaging 8.7 points and 5 rebounds per game in the Israeli League.

On January 8, 2017, Fischer signed with the Capitanes de Arecibo of Puerto Rico. He left Arecibo, after appearing in three games, and on March 14, 2017, he signed with Latvian club Valmiera, for the rest of the season.

On August 8, 2017, Fischer signed with the Shiga Lakestars, of the Japanese B.League.

On February 10, 2019, Fischer returned to Israel for a third stint, joining Bnei Herzliya for the rest of the season.

On December 11, 2019, Fischer signed with Elitzur Eito Ashkelon of the Israeli National League for the rest of the season.

== Israeli national team ==
Fischer has been a member of the senior Israeli national basketball team. He played with Israel at the 2015 EuroBasket.

== Career statistics ==
Legend
GP	Games played	GS	Games started	MPG	Minutes per game
FG%	Field-goal percentage	3P%	3-point field-goal percentage	FT%	Free-throw percentage
RPG	Rebounds per game	APG	Assists per game	SPG	Steals per game
BPG	Blocks per game	PPG	Points per game	PIR	Performance index rating
**Bold**	Career high

=== EuroLeague ===
*	Led the league

Year	Team	GP	GS	MPG	FG%	3P%	FT%	RPG	APG	SPG	BPG	PPG	PIR
2008–09	Maccabi	13	13	**28.5**	.701*	**1.000**	.808	**7.6**	1.2	.5	1.7*	**14.8**	**21.5***
2009–10	Maccabi	20	14	19.9	.660	.000	.846	5.0	1.5	.6	1.8*	8.1	12.6
2010–11	Real Madrid	**23***	2	18.5	.569	—	**.871**	5.9	.4	.5	1.4	6.2	10.3
2011–12	Bilbao	19	**19**	24.5	.663	.500	.710	5.9	**1.6**	.4	1.1	7.9	11.4
2013–14	Bamberg	4	0	23.0	.625	—	.750	2.8	.3	.5	**2.0**	9.0	10.3
2014–15	UNICS	10	5	25.8	**.750***	—	.793	5.7	1.2	**.9**	1.8	13.1	18.1
Career		89	53	22.6	.662	.500	.802	5.8	1.1	.5	1.6	9.2	13.6

=== Domestic leagues ===
Season	Team	League	GP	MPG	FG%	3P%	FT%	RPG	APG	SPG	BPG	PPG
2005–06	Anwil Włocławek	Polish PLK	3	24.0	.417	–	.750	9.0	1.0	.7	1.3	4.3
2005–06	Roanoke Dazzle	D-League	27	20.1	.579	–	.838	5.0	.6	.2	1.3	6.0
2006–07	EWE Baskets Oldenburg	German BBL	34	26.1	.624	–	.715	6.6	.9	.3	2.6	11.9
2007–08	Euphony Bree	Ethias League	41	32.5	.578	–	.765	10.8	1.8	1.2	2.7	14.2
2008–09	Maccabi Tel Aviv B.C.	Ligat HaAl	25	22.8	.741	–	.842	6.6	1.7	.8	2.0	10.4
2009–10	Maccabi Tel Aviv B.C.	Ligat HaAl	28	19.1	.667	.000	.717	5.8	1.4	.7	1.3	6.9
2010–11	Real Madrid	Liga ACB	40	19.6	.613	–	.778	4.7	.7	.3	1.4	6.2
2011–12	Bilbao Basket	Liga ACB	33	24.6	.603	.333	.774	5.5	1.3	1.2	1.9	8.5
2012–13	BC Donetsk	Ukraine SuperLeague	38	28.2	.623	.000	.784	7.4	2.8	1.0	1.9	11.0
2013–14	Brose Baskets Bamberg	German BBL	28	22.0	.641	.000	.783	6.1	1.1	.4	2.6	10.7
2014–15	UNICS Kazan	VTB United League	29	25.5	.628	.000	.865	5.3	1.9	.6	1.5	10.1
2017–18	Shiga	B.League	59	30.1	.624	.364	.843	9.9	3.1	1.0	2.2	13.6

== Personal ==
On March 1, 2009, Fischer was attacked outside of a club in Tel Aviv with a glass bottle. He was injured in the face and his facial nerves were damaged, but he has fully healed.

In July 2014, after marrying an Israeli woman, Fischer became an Israeli citizen and joined the Israel national basketball team.

== See also ==
- List of NCAA Division I men's basketball players with 13 or more blocks in a game
