= Shawn James (basketball) =

Guyanese-American basketball player, *1985

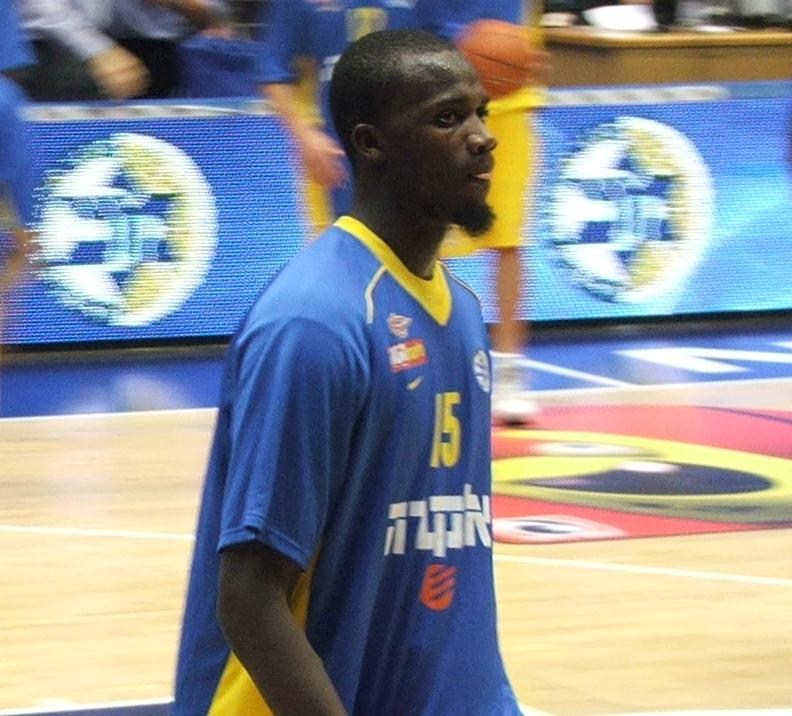
- James with Maccabi Tel Aviv in 2011

Personal information
- Born: September 10, 1983 (age 43) Berbice, Guyana
- Listed height: 6 ft 10 in (2.08 m)
- Listed weight: 234 lb (106 kg)

Career information
- High school: Notre Dame Prep (Fitchburg, Massachusetts)
- College: Northeastern (2004–2006); Duquesne (2007–2008)
- NBA draft: 2008: undrafted
- Playing career: 2008–2018
- Position: Power forward / center

Career history
- 2008–2011: Bnei Hasharon
- 2011–2014: Maccabi Tel Aviv
- 2014–2015: Olimpia Milano
- 2015: Bilbao Basket
- 2015–2016: Olympiacos Piraeus
- 2016: Eskişehir Basket
- 2016: Budućnost Podgorica
- 2017: Cariduros de Fajardo
- 2018: Boulazac Basket Dordogne

Career highlights
- EuroLeague champion (2014); All-EuroLeague Second Team (2013); EuroLeague Block Leader (2013); 2× Israeli League champion (2012, 2014); Adriatic League champion (2012); 3× Israeli Cup winner (2012–2014); All-Israeli League First Team (2013); Israeli League Defensive Player of the Year (2013); Israeli League rebounding leader (2011); NCAA blocks leader (2006); America East Defensive Player of the Year (2005); America East Rookie of the Year (2005)

Shawn Fitzalbert James (born September 10, 1983) is a Guyanese-American former professional basketball player. Standing at 6 ft 10 in (2.08 m), he played at the power forward and center positions. In 2010–11, he was the top rebounder in the Israel Basketball Premier League. In 2013 he was the Israeli Basketball Premier League Defensive Player of the Year, and named to the All-EuroLeague Second Team.

== College career ==
After playing at Brooklyn's Redirection High School, he transferred to Notre Dame Prep in Massachusetts to develop his game under coach Bill Barton, who would become his assistant coach later in college.

After a decent season, only two Division I schools believed in his potential, hometown's St. Francis and Boston's Northeastern University, he chose the latter. This proved to be a wise pick for the Huskies, James' 136 blocks in 2004–2005 broke the school's season record, also ranking him second in the nation. His scoring, field goal accuracy and rebounding allowed him to record two triple doubles on the way to America East Rookie and Defensive Player of the Year awards.

The next season he did even better, breaking the NCAA record for blocks per game in a season with 6.53, he had more blocks than 316 of 326 Division I teams, also averaging 12.4 points and 7.9 rebounds (with two more triple doubles) he was again Defensive Player of the Year, this time in the Colonial Athletic Association.

When coach Ron Everhart moved to Duquesne for the next season, James followed him there, under NCAA transfer rules he had to sit out the 2007 season, which he would have had to do in all cases as he was injured following the shooting (see below).

He came back the following season having seemingly shrugged off his injury, breaking the school record for blocks in a season with 111 (for perspective he beat Derrick Alston's previous record of 60) and led the team in scoring and rebounding as part of the Duke's first winning season in 14 years, earning a spot on the Atlantic 10 Defensive Team. At the end of the season he declared himself for early entry in the 2008 NBA draft and later signed with an agent, forfeiting his senior year at a university that he left under acrimonious circumstances after his lawsuit and accusations towards Everhart (see above).

He finished his college career with 443 blocks that put him 9th in the all time ranking for blocks, his five triple doubles were one short of tying the NCAA record.

=== Duquesne shootings ===
On 17 September 2006, James and four other Duquesne teammates Sam Ashaolu, Stuart Baldonado, Aaron Jackson and Kojo Mensah were the victims of an unprovoked shooting on the university's Pittsburgh campus. Ashaolu was shot in the head and neck, Mensah in the shoulder and arm, Baldonado through his back into his elbow, James in his left foot whilst Jackson was only grazed on the wrist by a bullet.

The shooter William B. Holmes II pleaded guilty to the shootings and was sentenced to up to 40 years in prison whilst the other gunman, Derek Lee, was sentenced to up to 14 years in prison, former university student Brittany Jones was sentenced to two years of probation for helping her armed friends enter the student dance where the shootings took place. The altercation started after a woman who came to the party with them flirted with one of the players.

James later sued Duquesne University in June 2008, alleging that they failed to provide adequate security on campus and that coach Everhart had made him play injured, all of which restricted his professional career opportunities. The lawsuit, as the similar ones lodged by Ashaolu, Baldonado and Mensah, was dismissed by a federal judge.

== Professional career ==
=== 2008–11: Bnei Hasharon ===
After going undrafted in the 2008 NBA draft, on 9 June 2008, he signed his first professional contract, a two-year deal with Israeli League side Bnei Hasharon.

Having started the season injured, he slowly started to adapt to the European game and despite limited playing time he led the league in blocks in a team that was eliminated in the first round of the playoffs.

After repeating the feat the next season, and improving his stats in all areas to have the third-best valuation in the league, he signed a one-year extension to his contract. The next season, he exploded into the spotlight, again dominating the league for blocks but also for rebounds, which, coupled with good shooting accuracy and solid scoring, made him the best valued player in the league, although not being named MVP. In 2010–11, he was the top rebounder in the Israel Basketball Premier League.

=== 2011–14: Maccabi Tel Aviv ===
In May 2011, he signed a two-year contract with Maccabi Tel Aviv, moving from the club that never passed the first match up in the playoffs to league champion and European powerhouse. The contract was reportedly worth $350,000 per season.

His first season with Maccabi allowed him to play against Europe's best in the EuroLeague where they reached the quarter-finals. On a team level it was a good season, winning the Adriatic League, his first trophy, the Israeli League and the Israeli Cup. On a personal level his playing time diminished as did his stats, although he still managed to top the league in blocks.

He had yet another good 2012–13 season, once again he led the Israeli league in blocks which led to being named the Israeli Basketball Premier League Defensive Player of the Year. He was also part of the All-BSL 1st team, even whilst Maccabi lost their title for the first time in 3 years. However, it was in the EuroLeague that he would shine, starting in the majority of his team's games, leading the completion in blocks per game, second in rebounding and fourth in PIR on the way to an All-EuroLeague Second Team selection.

Signing a new four-year deal, fan favorite James was even appointed captain, the first non-Israeli captain in the history of the club. In a cruel twist of fate, he got injured halfway through the next season, the ruptured disk in his back requiring surgery and ending his season, he had to watch from the sidelines as Maccabi won the European title for the first time in nearly 10 years.

With the departure of coach David Blatt to the NBA and in all probability because of his injury history, he was released by the club on 28 July 2014, ending a fruitful three-year collaboration.

=== 2014–15: Olimpia Milano ===
A few days later, on 31 July 2014, he signed a two-year deal with rival EuroLeague team EA7 Emporio Armani Milano of the Italian Serie A. Throughout the season he struggled to regain his past form, seeing limited playing time and generally coming short of the expectations from team and fans: in August he reached an agreement with EA7 Emporio Armani Milano for the early termination of his contract.

=== 2015–18 ===
In August 2015, he signed a one-year deal with Bilbao Basket. On December 4, 2015, he parted ways with Bilbao Basket. Two days later Olympiacos Piraeus signed James, paying his release fee. His contract was terminated by mutual consent on January 23, 2016. On February 27, 2016, he signed with Eskişehir Basket in Turkish TBL (second division) for the rest of the season.

On September 3, 2016, James signed with Montenegrin club Budućnost Podgorica for the 2016–17 season. On December 28, 2016, he parted ways with Budućnost.

== Personal life ==
The son of Gordon and Marva James, he has seven siblings. Three of his brothers played basketball professionally or at college level. The youngest brother Delroy James played with Serie A club Enel Brindisi, older brother Gordon has played professionally in Japan and Latin America, whilst younger brother Lex played for St. Francis without going pro. He has another brother Devaun and three sisters, Teceeta, Enola, and Minette Graves.

Shawn moved with his parents and most of his siblings to Brooklyn, New York in 1990 from his native Guyana, there he discovered basketball, having mostly dallied with cricket before, he only started seriously playing the game at 17 after a growth spurt. He is married to former Northeastern player Melissa Kowalski whom he met at the university, they have two children, twin sons Brooklyn and Brayden.

== Career statistics ==
Legend
| GP | Games played | GS | Games started | MPG | Minutes per game |
| FG% | Field-goal percentage | 3P% | 3-point field-goal percentage | FT% | Free-throw percentage |
| RPG | Rebounds per game | APG | Assists per game | SPG | Steals per game |
| BPG | Blocks per game | PPG | Points per game | PIR | Performance index rating |
| **Bold** | Career high |

=== EuroLeague ===
| † | Denotes season in which James won the EuroLeague |
| * | Led the league |

| Year | Team | GP | GS | MPG | FG% | 3P% | FT% | RPG | APG | SPG | BPG | PPG | PIR |
|---|---|---|---|---|---|---|---|---|---|---|---|---|---|
| 2011–12 | Maccabi | 14 | 1 | 8.4 | .448 | — | .667 | 2.4 | .2 | .3 | .9 | 2.6 | 2.9 |
| 2012–13 | Maccabi | **27** | **22** | **24.2** | .627 | .000 | .740 | **6.5** | 1.0 | **.9** | **1.9*** | **11.5** | **16.6** |
| 2013–14† | Maccabi | 10 | 5 | 17.5 | **.683** | **1.000** | .611 | 3.3 | **1.3** | .7 | 1.5 | 9.8 | 12.2 |
| 2014–15 | Milano | 18 | 2 | 12.8 | .532 | .000 | .440 | 3.2 | .4 | .4 | .9 | 3.4 | 4.4 |
| 2015–16 | Olympiacos | 5 | 0 | 6.2 | .500 | .000 | **1.000** | 1.6 | — | — | — | 3.4 | 2.0 |
| Career | | 74 | 30 | 16.3 | .614 | .125 | .664 | 4.1 | .7 | .6 | 1.3 | 7.1 | 9.4 |

== See also ==
- List of NCAA Division I men's basketball season blocks leaders
- List of NCAA Division I men's basketball career blocks leaders
- List of NCAA Division I basketball career triple-doubles leaders
