= Jarvis Varnado =

American basketball player (born 1988)

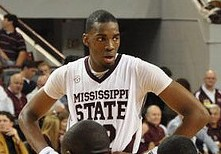
- Varnado with Mississippi State in 2009

Personal information
- Born: March 1, 1988 (age 38) Fairfax, Virginia, U.S.
- Listed height: 6 ft 10 in (2.08 m)
- Listed weight: 225 lb (102 kg)

Career information
- High school: Haywood (Brownsville, Tennessee)
- College: Mississippi State (2006–2010)
- NBA draft: 2010: 2nd round, 41st overall pick
- Drafted by: Miami Heat
- Playing career: 2010–2023
- Position: Power forward / center

Career history
- 2010–2011: Pistoia
- 2011–2012: Hapoel Jerusalem
- 2012: Virtus Roma
- 2012: Sioux Falls Skyforce
- 2012–2013: Boston Celtics
- 2013: Miami Heat
- 2013: →Sioux Falls Skyforce
- 2013–2014: Iowa Energy
- 2014: Chicago Bulls
- 2014: Philadelphia 76ers
- 2014–2015: Los Angeles D-Fenders
- 2015: Piratas de Quebradillas
- 2015–2016: Dinamo Sassari
- 2016–2017: İstanbul BB
- 2017–2018: Zaragoza
- 2018–2019: Memphis Hustle
- 2019: Fos Provence
- 2019–2020: Hapoel Gilboa Galil
- 2021–2023: Club Atlético Aguada
- 2023: Piratas de La Guaira

Career highlights
- NBA champion (2013); NBA D-League All-Star (2014); NABC Defensive Player of the Year (2010); Lefty Driesell Award (2010); 2× NCAA blocks leader (2008, 2009); 2× First-team All-SEC (2009, 2010); 3× SEC Defensive Player of the Year (2008–2010); SEC All-Defensive team (2010); SEC tournament MVP (2009)
- Stats at NBA.com
- Stats at Basketball Reference
Medals
Men's basketball
Representing United States
Summer Universiade
Bronze medal – third place	2009 Belgrade	Team competition

Jarvis Lamar Varnado (born March 1, 1988) is an American former professional basketball player who played for two seasons in the National Basketball Association (NBA), for the Boston Celtics, Miami Heat, Chicago Bulls, and Philadelphia 76ers. Varnado was known as a defensive specialist and was especially adept at shot blocking, aided by his large wingspan.

== Early life ==
Varnado graduated from Haywood High School in Brownsville, Tennessee in 2006.

Considered a four-star recruit by Rivals.com, Varnado was listed as the No. 16 power forward and the No. 62 player in the nation in 2006.

== College career ==
Varnado played for Mississippi State in the Southeastern Conference (SEC) of the NCAA Division I from 2006 to 2010.

He led the NCAA in blocks for the 2007–08 season with 157 blocks, tying Shaquille O'Neal for the most blocks in a season in the SEC. In the 2008–09 season, he would break that single season record with 170 blocks.

On November 21, 2009, Varnado became the SEC's all-time career block record holder with 413 total blocks in his career. This passed O'Neal's career block record of 412. On January 23, 2010, Varnado surpassed Adonal Foyle on the NCAA's Division I all-time career blocks list to become the second-leading shot-blocker. Needing 8 blocks for the record, Varnado became the NCAA's Division I all-time shot blocker against Alabama on February 24, 2010, passing Wojciech Myrda's record of 535 career blocks.

Varnado was named SEC Defensive Player of the Year in 3 consecutive years (2008, 2009 and 2010) becoming the first person to do so. He is one of just two college players in history to achieve the milestone of 1,000 points, 1,000 rebounds and 500 blocks (along with David Robinson).

== Professional career ==
=== Carmatic Pistoia (2010–2011) ===
Varnado was drafted by the Miami Heat with the 41st pick in the 2010 NBA draft. However, he signed to play with Carmatic Pistoia, an Italian team playing in the second-division. Varnado played 33 games with Pistoia and averaged 15.4 points, 8.9 rebounds, and 3.1 blocks per game.

=== Hapoel Jerusalem (2011–2012) ===
Varnado participated in minicamps with the Heat during the summer of 2011. On August 12, 2011, he signed a contract with Hapoel Jerusalem of Israeli Basketball Super League. After playing 12 games for the club in all competitions, on January 24, 2012, Varnado left the team.

=== Virtus Roma (2012) ===
After he exited Jerusalem, Varnado signed with Virtus Roma of the Italian first division Serie A.

=== Sioux Falls Skyforce (2012) ===
On September 7, 2012, Varnado was signed by the Heat for workouts. He was waived on October 26, 2012. After being waived by the Heat, Varnado joined the Sioux Falls Skyforce of the NBA Development League. Varnado was named D-League player of the week for the first week of the 2012–13 season.

=== Boston Celtics (2012–2013) ===
On December 24, 2012, Varnado was signed by the Boston Celtics. On January 6, 2013, he was waived by the Celtics.

=== Miami Heat (2013) ===
On January 9, 2013, Varnado accepted a 10-day contract with the Miami Heat, the same team that drafted him in 2010. He was signed to a second 10-day contract on January 20, 2013, and was signed for the rest of the season on January 30. The Heat sent him to the Sioux Falls Skyforce for assignments in March and April 2013. Varnado won his first NBA championship with the Heat when they defeated the San Antonio Spurs 4–3 in the 2013 NBA Finals.

On October 21, 2013, Varnado was waived by the Heat.

=== Iowa Energy (2013–2014) ===
On October 31, 2013, Varnado was re-acquired by the Sioux Falls Skyforce. The next day, he was traded to the Iowa Energy. On February 3, 2014, Varnado was named to the Prospects All-Star roster for the 2014 NBA D-League All-Star Game.

=== Chicago Bulls (2014) ===
On February 18, 2014, Varnado signed a 10-day contract with the Chicago Bulls. On February 28, 2014, the Bulls decided not to sign Varnado to a second 10-day contract.

=== Philadelphia 76ers (2014) ===
On March 1, 2014, Varnado signed a 10-day contract with the Philadelphia 76ers. On March 12, 2014, he signed with the 76ers for the rest of the season. On March 29, 2014, he recorded a career high 9 points and 6 blocks in a 123–98 win over the Detroit Pistons. On October 7, 2014, he was waived by the 76ers.

=== Los Angeles D-Fenders (2014–2015) ===
Varnado's D-League rights were traded by the Iowa Energy to the Los Angeles D-Fenders on December 30, 2014. He joined the side and averaged 11.6 points in eight games.

=== Piratas de Quebradillas (2015) ===
On April 21, 2015, after the end of the 2014–15 D-League season, Varnado signed with Piratas de Quebradillas of Puerto Rico for the rest of the 2015 BSN season.

=== Dinamo Sassari (2015–2016) ===
On July 22, 2015, Varnado signed a one-year deal with Dinamo Sassari to play in the Serie A and the European first tier EuroLeague.

=== Istanbul Büyükşehir Belediyespor (2016–2017) ===
In July 2016, Varnado joined the Los Angeles Lakers for the 2016 NBA Summer League. On August 30, 2016, Varnado was reported to have signed with İstanbul Büyükşehir Belediyespor of the Turkish Basketball Super League (BSL). On February 5, 2017, Varnado was reported to have parted-way with İstanbul Büyükşehir Belediyespor.

=== Tecnyconta Zaragoza (2017–2018) ===
On August 2, 2017, Varnado was reported to have signed a one-year deal with Tecnyconta Zaragoza of the Liga ACB. On March 20, 2018, Varnado was reported to have parted-way with Tecnyconta Zaragoza. after Varnado suffered from a plantar fascia injury in his left foot.

=== Memphis Hustle (2018–2019) ===
On November 30, 2018, Varnado signed with the Memphis Hustle of the NBA G League.

=== Fos Provence (2019) ===
On January 15, 2019, Varnado parted ways with the Hustle to join Fos Provence of the French LNB Pro A, where he averaged 9.8 points, 4.8 rebounds and 1.5 blocks in 18 games played.

=== Hapoel Gilboa Galil (2019–2020) ===
On September 25, 2019, Varnado returned to Israel for a second stint, signing a one-year deal with Hapoel Gilboa Galil. He averaged 7.0 points, 5.2 rebounds, and 1.2 blocks per game.

=== Club Atlético Aguada (2021–2023) ===
On October 6, 2021, Varnado signed with Club Atlético Aguada of the Liga Uruguaya de Básquetbol.

== NBA career statistics ==
Legend
GP	Games played	GS	Games started	MPG	Minutes per game
FG%	Field goal percentage	3P%	3-point field goal percentage	FT%	Free throw percentage
RPG	Rebounds per game	APG	Assists per game	SPG	Steals per game
BPG	Blocks per game	PPG	Points per game	**Bold**	Career high
†	Won an NBA championship

=== Regular season ===
Year	Team	GP	GS	MPG	FG%	3P%	FT%	RPG	APG	SPG	BPG	PPG
2012–13	Boston	5	0	3.6	.500	.000	.500	.6	.2	.2	.0	1.2
2012–13†	Miami	8	0	5.0	.333	.000	.000	.8	.3	.0	.3	.3
2013–14	Chicago	1	0	2.0	.000	.000	.000	.0	.0	.0	.0	.0
2013–14	Philadelphia	**23**	0	**14.7**	**.600**	.000	**.519**	**2.7**	**.6**	**.4**	**1.3**	**4.3**
Career		37	0	10.7	.582	.000	.518	1.9	.4	.3	.8	2.9

== See also ==
- List of NCAA Division I men's basketball career blocks leaders
- List of NCAA Division I men's basketball season blocks leaders
