= Wojciech Myrda =

Polish basketball player (1979–2018)

Personal information
- Born: March 18, 1979
- Died: September 19, 2018 (aged 39) Siedliska, Poland
- Listed height: 7 ft 2 in (2.18 m)
- Listed weight: 223 lb (101 kg)

Career information
- High school: Ouachita Parish (Monroe, Louisiana)
- College: Louisiana–Monroe (1998–2002)
- NBA draft: 2002: undrafted
- Playing career: 2002–2006
- Position: Center
- Number: 14

Career history
- 2002–2003: Avtodor Saratov
- 2004–2005: Spišská Nová Ves
- 2005: Resovia Rzeszów
- 2005–2006: Spišská Nová Ves

Career highlights
- NCAA blocks leader (2002); First-team All-Southland (2002)

Wojciech Myrda (March 18, 1979 – September 19, 2018) was a Polish professional basketball player. At 7 ft 2 in (2.18 m) tall, he played the center position. He was born in Poland but graduated from high school in the United States. Myrda attended Ouachita Parish High School in Monroe, Louisiana for his senior year in 1997–98.

Myrda is best known for his collegiate career at the University of Louisiana at Monroe between 1998–99 and 2001–02. During his four-year career, Myrda blocked a then-NCAA Division I record 535 shots, which was 43 more than the next closest player. He has since been passed by Jarvis Varnado, whose 564 career blocks are now the most ever. In 2001–02, he led the nation in blocks per game, and in his final three seasons he finished in the top five for that statistical category. Myrda set a single game school record when he recorded 13 blocks against Texas–San Antonio on January 17, 2002.

After college he went unselected and unsigned by any National Basketball Association (NBA) teams. He spent the next four years playing professionally in Poland, Russia and Slovakia, but injuries hampered his play for most of his career.

== See also ==
- List of NCAA Division I men's basketball players with 13 or more blocks in a game
- List of NCAA Division I men's basketball season blocks leaders
- List of NCAA Division I men's basketball career blocks leaders
