= Kaspi (surname) =

Kaspi or Caspi, sometimes Casspi (Hebrew: כספי) is a Jewish surname. Literally meaning "silver", in many cases this surname was chosen as a Hebraization of West Ashkenazi ornamental surnames with the word "silver" within, e.g., Zilber, Zilberman, Silverman, etc.

Notable people with the surname include:

== Romanized as Caspi ==
- Amir Caspi, American solar physicist
- Avshalom Caspi (born 1960), an Israeli-American psychologist
- Dan Caspi (1945–2017), Israeli educator, expert in communication studies
- Itzhak Caspi, Israeli footballer
- Matti Caspi (1949–2026), Israeli composer, musician, singer and lyricist
- Mickie Caspi, Israeli-American calligrapher and artist specializing in Judaica
- Nathanael ben Nehemiah Caspi (14th century-15th century), a Provençal scholar
- Ram Caspi (1939–2025), an Israeli attorney
- Omri Casspi (born 1988), Israeli basketball player

== Romanized as Kaspi ==
- Joseph Ibn Kaspi (1279–1340), a Provençal exegete, grammarian and philosopher
- Haya Kaspi (born 1948), Israeli operations researcher, statistician, and probability theorist
- Omri Kaspi (born 1988), Israeli basketball player
- Victoria Kaspi (born 1967), American-Canadian astrophysicist
- Werner Kaspi (1917–?), Israeli footballer

== See also ==
- Kaspi, a town in central Georgia
- Caspi (disambiguation)
