= Silber =

Silber is a surname, originally the German word meaning silver. Notable people with the surname include:

- Alexandra Silber (born 1983), American actor, singer, writer, and educator
- Christoph Silber (born 1971), German-born British film producer, screenwriter, and director
- Christopher Silber (born 1973), American television writer and producer
- Eddie Silber (1914–1976), American baseball player
- Irwin Silber (1925–2010), American writer, editor, publisher, historian, folk-song collector, and political activist
- Jacek Silber (1932–1971), Polish con artist, forger and a fake Austrian consul
- Jane Silber, American chief executive, computer scientist, and artificial intelligence technologist
- Joan Silber, American novelist
- John Silber (1926–2012), American academician, politician, philosophy professor, and university president
- Jules C. Silber (c.1885–?), German WWI spy, autobiographer, and interpreter
- Laura Silber, American professor, foundation executive, and writer
- Marianne Rafferty (née Silber; born 1971), American television news anchor and journalist
- Mary Silber, American statistical science professor, mathematician, and physicist
- Max I. Silber (1911–2004), American Scouting promoter and enthusiast, ingot manufacturer, and businessman
- Mitchell D. Silber (born 1970), American political risk, intelligence, and security analyst, and television commentator
- Norm Silber, American politician
- Otto Silber (1893–1940), Estonian footballer and Olympics competitor
- Sherman Silber, American urologist, microsurgeon, inventor, and infertility specialist
- Stephen Silber (born 1944), British judge
- William L. Silber, American economist, professor, and writer

== Fictional characters ==
- Katrina Silber, minor character in Buffy the Vampire Slayer
- Silber, a character in the Buriki One video game series

== See also ==
- Silberman
- Silver (disambiguation)
- Silverman
- Zilber
