= 2008–09 NBA season =

63rd NBA season

- League: National Basketball Association
- Sport: Basketball
- Duration: October 28, 2008 – April 16, 2009; April 18 – May 30, 2009 (Playoffs); June 4 – 14, 2009 (Finals)
- Games: 82
- Teams: 30
- TV partner(s): ABC, TNT, ESPN, NBA TV

Draft
- Top draft pick: Derrick Rose
- Picked by: Chicago Bulls

Regular season
- Top seed: Cleveland Cavaliers
- Season MVP: LeBron James (Cleveland)
- Top scorer: Dwyane Wade (Miami)

Playoffs
- Eastern champions: Orlando Magic
- Eastern runners-up: Cleveland Cavaliers
- Western champions: Los Angeles Lakers
- Western runners-up: Denver Nuggets

Finals
- Champions: Los Angeles Lakers
- Runners-up: Orlando Magic
- Finals MVP: Kobe Bryant (L.A. Lakers)

NBA seasons
- ← 2007–08 2009–10 →

The 2008–09 NBA season was the 63rd season of the National Basketball Association (NBA). The Los Angeles Lakers defeated the Orlando Magic in the 2009 NBA Finals, four games to one.

The 2008 NBA draft was held on June 28, 2008, and Derrick Rose was selected first overall by the Chicago Bulls and eventually was awarded the 2009 NBA Rookie of the Year Award. The 2009 NBA All-Star Game was hosted at the US Airways Center in Phoenix. The Western Conference All-Stars defeated the Eastern Conference All-Stars 146–119. The All-Star Game co-MVPs were Shaquille O'Neal and Kobe Bryant.

This was the first NBA season since 1966–67 without a Seattle franchise, as the SuperSonics moved to Oklahoma City, Oklahoma in July 2008 and became the Oklahoma City Thunder.

== Transactions ==
=== Coaching changes ===
Offseason
Team	2007–08 coach	2008–09 coach
Charlotte Bobcats	Sam Vincent	Larry Brown
Chicago Bulls	Jim Boylan	Vinny Del Negro
Milwaukee Bucks	Larry Krystkowiak	Scott Skiles
Miami Heat	Pat Riley	Erik Spoelstra
New York Knicks	Isiah Thomas	Mike D'Antoni
Dallas Mavericks	Avery Johnson	Rick Carlisle
Detroit Pistons	Flip Saunders	Michael Curry
Phoenix Suns	Mike D'Antoni	Terry Porter
In-season
Team	Outgoing coach	New coach
Oklahoma City Thunder	P. J. Carlesimo	Scott Brooks (interim)
Washington Wizards	Eddie Jordan	Ed Tapscott (interim)
Toronto Raptors	Sam Mitchell	Jay Triano (interim)
Minnesota Timberwolves	Randy Wittman	Kevin McHale (interim)
Philadelphia 76ers	Maurice Cheeks	Tony DiLeo (interim)
Sacramento Kings	Reggie Theus	Kenny Natt (interim)
Memphis Grizzlies	Marc Iavaroni	Lionel Hollins
Phoenix Suns	Terry Porter	Alvin Gentry (interim)

- On November 21, 2008, the Oklahoma City Thunder fired head coach P. J. Carlesimo and assistant coach Paul Westhead after a 1–12 start. Scott Brooks was named interim head coach for the rest of the season.
- On November 24, 2008, the Washington Wizards fired head coach Eddie Jordan after a 1–10 start. Ed Tapscott took over for the remainder of the season.
- On December 3, 2008, the Toronto Raptors fired head coach Sam Mitchell, one day after the team lost by 39 points against the Denver Nuggets. Jay Triano was named the team's interim head coach.
- On December 8, 2008, the Minnesota Timberwolves fired head coach Randy Wittman after a 4–15 start to the season. Kevin McHale was announced as his replacement.
- On December 13, 2008, the Philadelphia 76ers fired head coach Maurice Cheeks after a 9–14 start. Assistant general manager Tony DiLeo was appointed interim head coach for the rest of the season.
- On December 15, 2008, the Sacramento Kings fired head coach Reggie Theus after a 6–18 start to the season. Assistant coach Kenny Natt was appointed interim head coach.
- On January 22, 2009, the Memphis Grizzlies fired head coach Marc Iavaroni. Assistant coach Johnny Davis was appointed interim head coach, and three days later, Lionel Hollins took over as head coach.
- On February 16, 2009, the Phoenix Suns fired head coach Terry Porter. He was replaced by Alvin Gentry.

== Notable occurrences ==
July

- On July 2, 2008, the city of Seattle and the Seattle SuperSonics (owned by the Oklahoma City, Oklahoma-based Professional Basketball Club LLC) reached a settlement where the defendants agreed to pay $45 million to relocate the team to Oklahoma City, retain the SuperSonics' players, coaches, and contracts, and "share" the SuperSonics' franchise history with a hypothetical future Seattle team. However, the SuperSonics name, colors, and logo remained reserved for a future Seattle club. The team was named the Oklahoma City Thunder on September 3, 2008.
- On July 23, 2008, restricted free agent Josh Childress signed with Euroleague club Olympiacos for three years and $20 million net (the biggest signing in Euroleague history), marking the first departure of an American-born player to Europe in the prime of his career.

October

- On October 11, 2008, the NBA's first outdoor game in more than three decades was held on the Indian Wells Tennis Garden in Indian Wells, California. The game was played between the Denver Nuggets and Phoenix Suns, who played the last outdoor game against the Milwaukee Bucks in 1972.
- On October 23, 2008, the NBA Board of Governors (owners) approved expanded use of instant replays for this season to determine if made baskets would be worth two or three points, and to award either two or three free throws on shooting fouls.

December

- On December 10, 2008, Carmelo Anthony scored 33 of his season-high 45 points in the third quarter in a win against the Minnesota Timberwolves, breaking the franchise record and equaling the league record for most points in a quarter.
- On December 11, 2008, Cuttino Mobley retired from the NBA because of a severe case of hypertrophic cardiomyopathy, a heart disease.
- On December 25, 2008, the Los Angeles Lakers broke the Boston Celtics' 19-game winning streak in a rematch of the previous season's NBA Finals.

January

- On January 22, 2009, Alonzo Mourning retired from the NBA after 15 seasons.

February

- On February 4, 2009, LeBron James's 52-point triple-double against the New York Knicks on February 4 was negated by subtracting a rebound from his total. The negated rebound was given to Ben Wallace. James would have been the first player since Kareem Abdul-Jabbar in 1975 to have a 50-point triple-double.
- On February 5, 2009, the Los Angeles Lakers broke another Celtic winning streak this time at 12-game winning streak, joining a short list of teams to break two 12+ game win streaks in a season.
- On February 8, 2009, the Los Angeles Lakers broke the Cleveland Cavaliers' 23-game home-winning streak. In doing so, the Lakers became the first team in NBA history to win back-to-back games on the road (Boston and Cleveland) against teams with .800-plus win percentages at least 40 games into the season.

NBA All-Star Break
The 2009 NBA All-Star Game was played at the US Airways Center, home of the Phoenix Suns, on February 15, 2009, with the West winning 146–119 and the Phoenix Suns' Shaquille O'Neal and Los Angeles Lakers' Kobe Bryant being named the Co-MVPs. During the NBA All-Star Weekend, Nate Robinson of the New York Knicks won the Sprite Slam Dunk competition; Kevin Durant, who won the Rookie Challenge MVP, also won the inaugural H.O.R.S.E Competition and Miami's Daequan Cook beat Rashard Lewis in a tiebreaker to win the Foot Locker Three-Point Shootout.

- On February 20, 2009, Utah Jazz owner Larry H. Miller died from complications of diabetes at the age of 64.
- On February 20, 2009, the Phoenix Suns became the first team since the 1990 Portland Trail Blazers to have three consecutive games of scoring 140 points or more.
- On February 22, 2009, Portland Trail Blazers point guard Steve Blake tied an NBA record by recording 14 assists in the first quarter in a game against the Los Angeles Clippers.
- On February 26, 2009, Chicago Bulls legends Norm Van Lier and Johnny "Red" Kerr died at the ages of 61 and 76, respectively.

March

- On March 3, 2009, in the NBA's third annual Noche Latina event, a program that recognizes the NBA's fans and players from across Latin America and U.S. Hispanic communities, the Los Angeles Lakers wore celebratory jerseys (with the wording Los Lakers) in their 99–89 win over the Memphis Grizzlies. Noche Latina celebrations took place in eight of the top ten American Hispanic markets in the NBA this season (up from four in 2007–08): Los Angeles, Miami, Phoenix, San Antonio, Dallas, Chicago, Houston and New York.
- On March 10, 2009, the Utah Jazz won their 12th game in a row. That was the fourth-longest win streak in franchise history and the longest since 1999. It was later broken by a loss to the Atlanta Hawks.
- On March 13, 2009, Detroit Pistons owner William Davidson died at the age of 86.
- On March 13, 2009, the Philadelphia 76ers hosted the Chicago Bulls at their former home, the Wachovia Spectrum, instead of their regular home, the Wachovia Center. The Sixers left the Spectrum following the 1995–96 season to move to the former John F. Kennedy Stadium site.
- On March 15, 2009, the Phoenix Suns scored the third-highest number of points in a regulation game—without overtime—in a 154–130 win against the Golden State Warriors. They also scored 56 fast-break points, the highest recorded since the league began tracking the stat in 1997. The win also included two 40+ point quarters, 42 in the first and 46 in the third.
- On March 21, 2009, Shaquille O'Neal moved from sixth all-time leading scorer to fifth, surpassing Moses Malone.

April

- On April 2, 2009, the NBA teamed up with NRDC for the first-ever NBA Green Week 2009 in an effort to generate awareness and funds for protecting the environment. The week featured special on-court apparel, auctions to support environmental protection organizations, hands-on community service projects and the launch of a PSA featuring Hollywood icon and NRDC Trustee Robert Redford. The Denver Nuggets, the Charlotte Bobcats, and the Chicago Bulls wore green-colored uniforms and socks made from 45 percent organic cotton during select home games throughout the week to raise additional environmental awareness. NBA partner adidas outfitted all players with 100 percent organic cotton adidas shooting shirts featuring the NBA Green logo, which were worn during every game that week.
- On April 10, 2009, Kobe Bryant moved from the 18th all-time leading scorer to 17th, surpassing Charles Barkley.
- On April 15, 2009, the Cleveland Cavaliers finished the season with a home record of 39–2, just one game shy of matching the all-time record.
- On April 15, 2009, Shaquille O'Neal led the league in field goal percentage for an NBA-record tenth time.
- On April 23, 2009, Dikembe Mutombo retired after 18 seasons in the NBA, at age 42.
- On April 27, 2009, the Denver Nuggets matched the largest margin of victory in an NBA playoff game by beating the New Orleans Hornets 121–63, in Game 4 of the 2009 NBA playoffs. The record is shared with the Minneapolis Lakers 133–75 victory over the St. Louis Hawks in 1956.
- On April 30, 2009, the Chicago Bulls and the Boston Celtics played in a record fourth overtime game in a single playoff series.

May

- On May 9, 2009, Hall of Fame head coach Chuck Daly died of pancreatic cancer at the age of 78. For the entire NBA Playoffs, all NBA coaches and commentators wore pins with the initials "CD" on their suits to honor the Hall of Fame coach.
- On May 21, 2009, Sam Cassell retired after 15 seasons in the NBA, at age 39.
- On May 22, 2009, World Wrestling Entertainment and the Denver Nuggets were involved in a double-booking controversy, where WWE's WWE Raw was supposed to be held at the Pepsi Center on May 25. But Game 4 of the Western Conference Finals was also booked in the same venue on the same date. As a result, WWE decided to move the show, ironically, to the Staples Center, the home of the Nuggets' conference finals opponents, the Los Angeles Lakers.

June

- On June 14, 2009, the Los Angeles Lakers captured their 15th NBA title in franchise history with a 99–86 victory over the Orlando Magic in Game 5 of the 2009 NBA Finals. This also marked the tenth NBA Title for head coach Phil Jackson. In winning his tenth title, he passed Red Auerbach to obtain the crown of most titles for an NBA head coach.

== Records broken ==
- On December 17, 2008, Chris Paul of the New Orleans Hornets broke the 22-year-old record for consecutive games with a steal (105), previously held by Alvin Robertson, in a game against Robertson's former team, the San Antonio Spurs. The streak reached 108 games before ending on the December 25 against the Orlando Magic.
- On December 23, 2008, the Boston Celtics recorded the best two-loss start in NBA history (27–2), in a 110–91 victory over the Philadelphia 76ers. They also broke a franchise record for the longest winning streak (18) with their 19th consecutive win. Their winning streak came to an end after a loss to the Los Angeles Lakers.
- On January 13, 2009, the Orlando Magic made an NBA record 23 three-pointers against the Sacramento Kings. Nine of the twelve Magic players who played in the game made at least one three-pointer.
- On February 2, 2009, Kobe Bryant set a record for most points scored in a game at the modern Madison Square Garden (61), besting the 60 points set by Bernard King. That was until Carmelo Anthony broke the record (62) in January 2014 against the Charlotte Bobcats.
- On March 15, 2009, the Phoenix Suns scored 56 fast-break points against the Golden State Warriors, the most recorded in a single game since the league began tracking the stat in 1997.
- On April 15, 2009, the Raptors' José Calderón topped the 1980–81 Rockets' Calvin Murphy for the NBA record for free-throw percentage. Calderón made 98.1% of his free throws in the season, missing only 3 of the 154 he took, taking the record from Murphy's mark of 95.8%.
- On April 15, 2009, Rudy Fernández of the Portland Trail Blazers set the rookie record for three-point field goals made in a season with 159.

== 2008–09 NBA changes ==
- Charlotte Bobcats – changed their uniforms added pinstripes with side panels to their jerseys and shorts.
- Denver Nuggets – slightly changed their primary logo added dark blue to their color scheme.
- Indiana Pacers – added new gold road alternate uniforms.
- Milwaukee Bucks – added new red road alternate uniforms.
- Minnesota Timberwolves – added new logo and new uniforms, remained with dark blue, green, black and grey to their color scheme, added side panels to their jerseys and shorts.
- New Orleans Hornets – added new logo and new uniforms, added blue to their color scheme, added pinstripes with side panels to their jerseys and shorts.
- Oklahoma City Thunder – relocation from Seattle, Washington to Oklahoma City, Oklahoma, added new logo and new uniforms, added orange sunset, thunder blue, yellow, dark navy blue and black to their color scheme, added side panels to their jerseys and shorts.
- Orlando Magic – changed their uniforms and their wordmark to their jerseys, added pinstripes with black side panels to their jerseys and shorts.
- Sacramento Kings – changed their uniforms, the purple road jersey changed from "Sacramento" wordmark script to the "Kings" wordmark script with black side panels to their jerseys and shorts, and the white home jersey changed from the "Kings" wordmark script to "Sacramento" wordmark script with changed colors from purple to black side panels to their jerseys and shorts.
- Toronto Raptors – slightly changed their primary logo removing the purple area to their color scheme, added new black road alternate uniforms with red and grey side panels to their jerseys and shorts.

== Standings ==
=== By division ===
Eastern Conference

Atlantic Division	W	L	PCT	GB	Home	Road	Div
y-Boston Celtics	62	20	.756	—	35–6	27–14	15–1
x-Philadelphia 76ers	41	41	.500	21	24–17	17–24	6–10
New Jersey Nets	34	48	.415	28	19–22	15–26	8–8
Toronto Raptors	33	49	.402	29	18–23	15–26	6–10
New York Knicks	32	50	.390	30	20–21	12–29	5–11

Central Division	W	L	PCT	GB	Home	Road	Div	GP
z-Cleveland Cavaliers	66	16	.805	—	39–2	27–14	13–3	82
x-Chicago Bulls	41	41	.500	25	28–13	13–28	9–7	82
x-Detroit Pistons	39	43	.476	27	21–20	18–23	7–9	82
Indiana Pacers	36	46	.439	30	25–16	11–30	7–9	82
Milwaukee Bucks	34	48	.415	32	22–19	12–29	4–12	82

Southeast Division	W	L	PCT	GB	Home	Road	Div	GP
y-Orlando Magic	59	23	.720	—	32–9	27–14	14–2	82
x-Atlanta Hawks	47	35	.573	12	31–10	16–25	11–5	82
x-Miami Heat	43	39	.524	16	28–13	15–26	9–7	82
Charlotte Bobcats	35	47	.427	24	23–18	12–29	5–11	82
Washington Wizards	19	63	.232	40	13–28	6–35	1–15	82

Western Conference

Northwest Division	W	L	PCT	GB	Home	Road	Div	GP
y–Denver Nuggets	54	28	.659	—	33–8	21–20	12–4	82
x–Portland Trail Blazers	54	28	.659	—	34–7	20–21	11–5	82
x–Utah Jazz	48	34	.585	6	33–8	15–26	10–6	82
Minnesota Timberwolves	24	58	.293	30	11–30	13–28	3–13	82
Oklahoma City Thunder	23	59	.280	31	15–26	8–33	4–12	82

Pacific Division	W	L	PCT	GB	Home	Road	Div	GP
c-Los Angeles Lakers	65	17	.793	—	36–5	29–12	14–2	82
Phoenix Suns	46	36	.561	19	28–13	18–23	11–5	82
Golden State Warriors	29	53	.354	36	21–20	8–33	6–10	82
Los Angeles Clippers	19	63	.232	46	11–30	8–33	2–14	82
Sacramento Kings	17	65	.207	48	11–30	6–35	7–9	82

Southwest Division	W	L	PCT	GB	Home	Road	Div
y-San Antonio Spurs	54	28	.659	—	28–13	26–15	10–6
x-Houston Rockets	53	29	.646	1	33–8	20–21	9–7
x-Dallas Mavericks	50	32	.610	4	32–9	18–23	7–9
x-New Orleans Hornets	49	33	.598	5	28–13	21–20	9–7
Memphis Grizzlies	24	58	.284	30	16–25	8–33	5–11

=== By conference ===
#	Eastern Conference				
#	Team	W	L	PCT	GB
1	z-Cleveland Cavaliers	66	16	.805	—
2	y-Boston Celtics	62	20	.756	4
3	y-Orlando Magic	59	23	.720	7
4	x-Atlanta Hawks	47	35	.573	19
5	x-Miami Heat	43	39	.524	23
6	x-Philadelphia 76ers	41	41	.500	25
7	x-Chicago Bulls	41	41	.500	25
8	x-Detroit Pistons	39	43	.476	27
9	Indiana Pacers	36	46	.439	30
10	Charlotte Bobcats	35	47	.427	31
11	New Jersey Nets	34	48	.415	32
12	Milwaukee Bucks	34	48	.415	32
13	Toronto Raptors	33	49	.402	33
14	New York Knicks	32	50	.390	34
15	Washington Wizards	19	63	.232	47

#	Western Conference				
#	Team	W	L	PCT	GB
1	c-Los Angeles Lakers	65	17	.793	—
2	y-Denver Nuggets	54	28	.659	11
3	y-San Antonio Spurs	54	28	.659	11
4	x-Portland Trail Blazers	54	28	.659	11
5	x-Houston Rockets	53	29	.646	12
6	x-Dallas Mavericks	50	32	.610	15
7	x-New Orleans Hornets	49	33	.598	16
8	x-Utah Jazz	48	34	.585	17
9	Phoenix Suns	46	36	.561	19
10	Golden State Warriors	29	53	.354	36
11	Memphis Grizzlies	24	58	.293	41
12	Minnesota Timberwolves	24	58	.293	41
13	Oklahoma City Thunder	23	59	.280	42
14	Los Angeles Clippers	19	63	.232	46
15	Sacramento Kings	17	65	.207	48

x- clinched playoff berth
y- clinched division title
c- clinched home court advantage for the conference playoffs
z- clinched home court advantage for the entire playoffs

=== Tiebreakers ===
==== Eastern Conference ====
- Philadelphia finished ahead of Chicago based on conference record (the 76ers' 25–27 to the Bulls' 24–28).

==== Western Conference ====
- Denver finished ahead of San Antonio based on head-to-head record (2–1) and Portland based on divisional record (the Nuggets' 12–4 to the Trail Blazers' 11–5), while San Antonio finished ahead of Portland upon winning the Southwest Division.

== Playoffs ==
Teams in bold advanced to the next round. The numbers to the left of each team indicate the team's seeding in its conference, and the numbers to the right indicate the number of games the team won in that round. The division champions are marked by an asterisk. Home court advantage does not necessarily belong to the higher-seeded team, but instead the team with the better regular season record; teams enjoying the home advantage are shown in italics.

First Round	Conference Semifinals
**E1**	**Cleveland***	**4**
E8	Detroit	0
**E1**	**Cleveland***	**4**
E4	Atlanta	0
**E4**	**Atlanta**	**4**
E5	Miami	3
**Eastern Conference**
**E3**	**Orlando***	**4**
E6	Philadelphia	2
**E3**	**Orlando***	**4**
E2	Boston*	3
**E2**	**Boston***	**4**
E7	Chicago	3
**W1**	**LA Lakers***	**4**
W8	Utah	1
**W1**	**LA Lakers***	**4**
W5	Houston	3
W4	Portland	2
**W5**	**Houston**	**4**
**Western Conference**
W3	San Antonio*	1
**W6**	**Dallas**	**4**
W6	Dallas	1
**W2**	**Denver***	**4**
**W2**	**Denver***	**4**
W7	New Orleans	1

Conference Finals
E1	Cleveland*	2
**E3**	**Orlando***	**4**
**W1**	**LA Lakers***	**4**
W2	Denver*	2

NBA Finals
E3	Orlando*	1
**W1**	**LA Lakers***	**4**

- * Division winner
- **Bold** Series winner
- Italic Team with home-court advantage

== Statistics leaders ==
Category	Player	Team	Stat Bold- NBA record
Points per game	Dwyane Wade	Miami Heat	30.2
Rebounds per game	Dwight Howard	Orlando Magic	13.8
Assists per game	Chris Paul	New Orleans Hornets	11.0
Steals per game	Chris Paul	New Orleans Hornets	2.77
Blocks per game	Dwight Howard	Orlando Magic	2.92
Field goal percentage	Shaquille O'Neal	Phoenix Suns	.609
Three-point field goal percentage	Anthony Morrow	Golden State Warriors	.467
Free throw percentage	José Calderón	Toronto Raptors	.**981**

== Awards ==
=== Yearly awards ===
- Most Valuable Player: LeBron James, Cleveland Cavaliers
- Defensive Player of the Year: Dwight Howard, Orlando Magic
- Rookie of the Year: Derrick Rose, Chicago Bulls
- Sixth Man of the Year: Jason Terry, Dallas Mavericks
- Most Improved Player: Danny Granger, Indiana Pacers
- Coach of the Year: Mike Brown, Cleveland Cavaliers
- Executive of the Year: Mark Warkentien, Denver Nuggets
- Sportsmanship Award: Chauncey Billups, Denver Nuggets
- J. Walter Kennedy Citizenship Award: Dikembe Mutombo, Houston Rockets

- All-NBA First Team:
  - F LeBron James – Cleveland Cavaliers
  - F Dirk Nowitzki – Dallas Mavericks
  - C Dwight Howard – Orlando Magic
  - G Kobe Bryant – Los Angeles Lakers
  - G Dwyane Wade – Miami Heat
- NBA All-Defensive First Team:
  - Dwight Howard – Orlando Magic
  - Kobe Bryant – Los Angeles Lakers
  - LeBron James – Cleveland Cavaliers
  - Chris Paul – New Orleans Hornets
  - Kevin Garnett – Boston Celtics
- NBA All-Rookie First Team:
  - Derrick Rose – Chicago Bulls
  - O. J. Mayo – Memphis Grizzlies
  - Russell Westbrook – Oklahoma City Thunder
  - Brook Lopez – New Jersey Nets
  - Michael Beasley – Miami Heat
- All-NBA Second Team:
  - F Tim Duncan – San Antonio Spurs
  - F Paul Pierce – Boston Celtics
  - C Yao Ming – Houston Rockets
  - G Chris Paul – New Orleans Hornets
  - G Brandon Roy – Portland Trail Blazers
- NBA All-Defensive Second Team:
  - Tim Duncan – San Antonio Spurs
  - Dwyane Wade – Miami Heat
  - Rajon Rondo – Boston Celtics
  - Shane Battier – Houston Rockets
  - Ron Artest – Houston Rockets
- NBA All-Rookie Second Team:
  - Eric Gordon – Los Angeles Clippers
  - Kevin Love – Minnesota Timberwolves
  - Mario Chalmers – Miami Heat
  - Marc Gasol – Memphis Grizzlies
  - D. J. Augustin – Charlotte Bobcats (tie)
  - Rudy Fernández – Portland Trail Blazers (tie)
- All-NBA Third Team:
  - F Carmelo Anthony – Denver Nuggets
  - F Pau Gasol – Los Angeles Lakers
  - C Shaquille O'Neal – Phoenix Suns
  - G Tony Parker – San Antonio Spurs
  - G Chauncey Billups – Denver Nuggets

=== Players of the week ===
The following players were named the Eastern and Western Conference Players of the Week.

Week	Eastern Conference	Western Conference	Ref.
Oct. 28 – Nov. 2	Chris Bosh (Toronto Raptors) (1/1)	Chris Paul (New Orleans Hornets) (1/4)	
Nov. 3 – Nov. 9	LeBron James (Cleveland Cavaliers) (1/7)	Amar'e Stoudemire (Phoenix Suns) (1/1)	
Nov. 10 – Nov. 16	LeBron James (Cleveland Cavaliers) (2/7)	Chauncey Billups (Denver Nuggets) (1/1)	
Nov. 17 – Nov. 23	Dwyane Wade (Miami Heat) (1/3)	Dirk Nowitzki (Dallas Mavericks) (1/2)	
Nov. 24 – Nov. 30	Devin Harris (New Jersey Nets) (1/2)	Brandon Roy (Portland Trail Blazers) (1/2)	
Dec. 1 – Dec. 7	Dwyane Wade (Miami Heat) (2/3)	Dirk Nowitzki (Dallas Mavericks) (2/2)	
Dec. 8 – Dec. 14	Al Harrington (New York Knicks) (1/1)	Tim Duncan (San Antonio Spurs) (1/1)	
Dec. 15 – Dec. 21	Jameer Nelson (Orlando Magic) (1/2)	Chris Paul (New Orleans Hornets) (2/4)	
Dec. 22 – Dec. 28	LeBron James (Cleveland Cavaliers) (3/7)	Kobe Bryant (Los Angeles Lakers) (1/3)	
Dec. 29 – Jan. 4	Rodney Stuckey (Detroit Pistons) (1/1)	Al Jefferson (Minnesota Timberwolves) (1/1)	
Jan. 5 – Jan. 11	Dwight Howard (Orlando Magic) (1/4)	Kobe Bryant (Los Angeles Lakers) (2/3)	
Jan. 12 – Jan. 18	Jameer Nelson (Orlando Magic) (2/2)	Chris Paul (New Orleans Hornets) (3/4)	
Jan. 19 – Jan. 25	LeBron James (Cleveland Cavaliers) (4/7)	Andrew Bynum (Los Angeles Lakers) (1/1)	
Jan. 26 – Feb. 1	David Lee (New York Knicks) (1/1)	Tony Parker (San Antonio Spurs) (1/2)	
Feb. 2 – Feb. 8	LeBron James (Cleveland Cavaliers) (5/7)	Pau Gasol (Los Angeles Lakers) (1/2)	
Feb. 18 – Feb. 23	Dwight Howard (Orlando Magic) (2/4)	Pau Gasol (Los Angeles Lakers) (2/2)	
Feb. 24 – Mar. 1	Devin Harris (New Jersey Nets) (2/2)	David West (New Orleans Hornets) (1/1)	
Mar. 2 – Mar. 8	Dwyane Wade (Miami Heat) (3/3)	Deron Williams (Utah Jazz) (1/1)	
Mar. 9 – Mar. 15	LeBron James (Cleveland Cavaliers) (6/7)	Kobe Bryant (Los Angeles Lakers) (3/3)	
Mar. 16 – Mar. 22	LeBron James (Cleveland Cavaliers) (7/7)	Chris Paul (New Orleans Hornets) (4/4)	
Mar. 23 – Mar. 29	Dwight Howard (Orlando Magic) (3/4)	Tony Parker (San Antonio Spurs) (2/2)	
Mar. 30 – Apr. 5	Dwight Howard (Orlando Magic) (4/4)	Jason Kidd (Dallas Mavericks) (1/1)	
Apr. 6 – Apr. 12	Ben Gordon (Chicago Bulls) (1/1)	Brandon Roy (Portland Trail Blazers) (2/2)	

=== Players of the month ===
The following players were named the Eastern and Western Conference Players of the Month.

Month	Eastern Conference	Western Conference	Ref.
October – November	LeBron James (Cleveland Cavaliers) (1/4)	Chris Paul (New Orleans Hornets) (1/2)	
December	Dwyane Wade (Miami Heat) (1/2)	Kobe Bryant (Los Angeles Lakers) (1/2)	
January	LeBron James (Cleveland Cavaliers) (2/4)	Kobe Bryant (Los Angeles Lakers) (2/2)	
February	Dwyane Wade (Miami Heat) (2/2)	Pau Gasol (Los Angeles Lakers) (1/1)	
March	LeBron James (Cleveland Cavaliers) (3/4)	Chris Paul (New Orleans Hornets) (2/2)	
April	LeBron James (Cleveland Cavaliers) (4/4)	Dirk Nowitzki (Dallas Mavericks) (1/1)	

=== Rookies of the month ===
The following players were named the Eastern and Western Conference Rookies of the Month.

Month	Eastern Conference	Western Conference	Ref.
October – November	Derrick Rose (Chicago Bulls) (1/3)	O. J. Mayo (Memphis Grizzlies) (1/2)	
December	Derrick Rose (Chicago Bulls) (2/3)	Russell Westbrook (Oklahoma City Thunder) (1/2)	
January	Brook Lopez (New Jersey Nets) (1/2)	Eric Gordon (Los Angeles Clippers) (1/1)	
February	Brook Lopez (New Jersey Nets) (2/2)	Russell Westbrook (Oklahoma City Thunder) (2/2)	
March	Derrick Rose (Chicago Bulls) (3/3)	Kevin Love (Minnesota Timberwolves) (1/1)	
April	Michael Beasley (Miami Heat) (1/1)	O. J. Mayo (Memphis Grizzlies) (2/2)	

=== Coaches of the month ===
The following coaches were named the Eastern and Western Conference Coaches of the Month.

Month	Eastern Conference	Western Conference	Ref.
October – November	Doc Rivers (Boston Celtics) (1/2)	Phil Jackson (Los Angeles Lakers) (1/1)	
December	Mike Brown (Cleveland Cavaliers) (1/3)	Byron Scott (New Orleans Hornets) (1/1)	
January	Stan Van Gundy (Orlando Magic) (1/1)	Kevin McHale (Minnesota Timberwolves) (1/1)	
February	Mike Brown (Cleveland Cavaliers) (2/3)	Jerry Sloan (Utah Jazz) (1/1)	
March	Mike Brown (Cleveland Cavaliers) (3/3)	Rick Adelman (Houston Rockets) (1/1)	
April	Doc Rivers (Boston Celtics) (2/2)	Nate McMillan (Portland Trail Blazers) (1/1)	

== Salary cap ==
The NBA announced that the salary cap for the season would be $58.680 million, immediately going into effect on July 9 as the league's "moratorium period" had ended and teams could begin signing free agents and making trades.

The tax level for the season was set at $71.150 million, with each team paying a $1 tax for each $1 by which it exceeds $71.150 million. The mid-level exception was $5.585 million for the season and the minimum team salary, which was set at 75% of the salary cap, was $44.010 million.

For the 2007–08 season, the salary cap was set at $55.630 million (▲$3.05 million), the tax level was $67.865 million (▲$3.285 million) and the mid-level exception was $5.356 million (▲$229,000).

== See also ==
- List of NBA regular season records
