= Zylberman =

Zylberman is a surname. Notable people with the surname include:

- Geula Zylberman (born 1931), Venezuelan artist
- Noam Zylberman (born 1973), Israeli voice actor
- Ruth Zylberman (born 1971), French Director, Author

== See also ==
- Zilberman
