= NBA All-Star Weekend H–O–R–S–E Competition =

Basketball competition

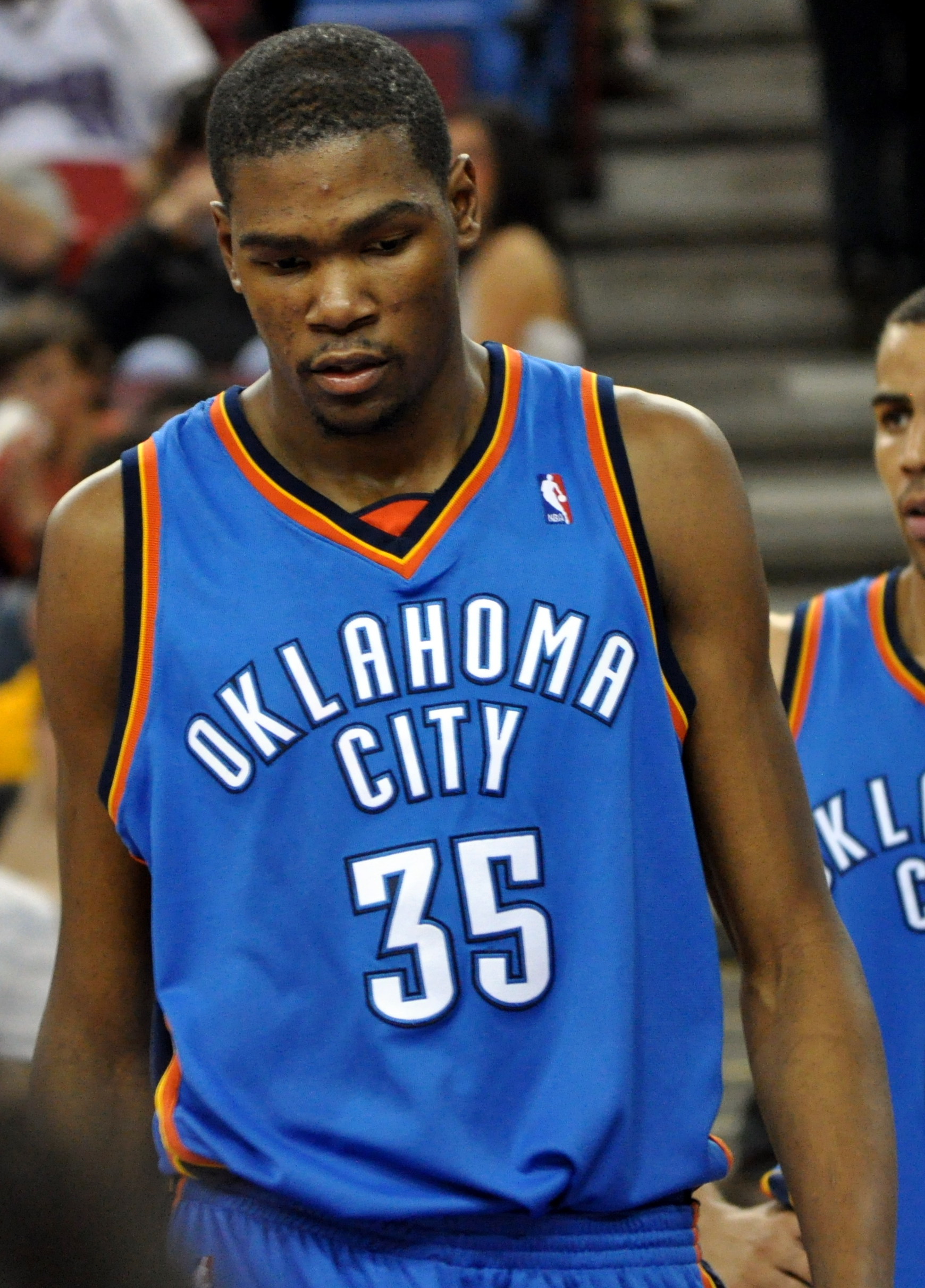
Kevin Durant won two of the four H-O-R-S-E competitions in NBA history.

The NBA All-Star H–O–R–S–E Competition (also called the NBA All–Star G–E–I–C–O Competition because of its sponsor, Geico Insurance) was a National Basketball Association (NBA) contest which began at the 2009 NBA All–Star Weekend in Phoenix, Arizona, and only lasted for two years. It was canceled from the All-Star festivities prior to the 2011 weekend. The contest had been held on the Saturday night prior to the All-Star Game.

== History ==
The NBA had held H–O–R–S–E competitions during the 1977–78 season. Throughout that season, CBS broadcast NBA games during the regular season and the playoffs. The host was Don Criqui and the NBA official was retired referee Mendy Rudolph. There were a total of 32 players and the finals had a match up of Pete Maravich verse Paul Westphal. Maravich was injured and replaced by Rick Barry who lost to Westphal. During halftime of those games, they showed a pre-taped H–O–R–S–E tournament pitting players from the NBA against each other. It featured, among others, Pete Maravich, Bob McAdoo, Kevin Grevey, and George Gervin. There was also a Battle of the Sexes match where Karen Logan, a female, beat Jerry West in 1975 and was matched against Oscar Robertson where she took a 7–0 lead. Her claim was that they changed the rules and she lost 10–8.

In 2020, due to the suspension of the NBA season because of the COVID-19 pandemic, the NBA produced a televised event in which NBA and WNBA players participated in a virtual H–O–R–S–E competition while quarantining at their respective homes. The NBA raised $200,000 for charities while Mike Conley Jr. of the Utah Jazz won the first virtual competition, edging the Chicago Bulls' Zach LaVine.

== Rules ==
The modern-day All-Star Competition was similar to that of regular H–O–R–S–E, where each participant took shots from unconventional locations and in unconventional ways to diminish their opponents' chances of duplicating the shot. Certain rule adjustments were made, however, that differed from conventional H–O–R–S–E competition:

- No dunking was allowed.
- Players had 24 seconds each to create and mimic shots.
- An NBA referee authenticated the new shots (that the player executed what he announced) and any mimic shot.

The game took place on a 45 feet 0 inches (13.72 m) × 50 feet 0 inches (15.24 m) court, half the size of a regulation length basketball court.

== Winners ==
Player (#)	Denotes the number of times the player won
Team (#)	Denotes the number of times a player from this team won

Season	Player	Team	Finished with
1977–78	Paul Westphal	Phoenix Suns	H–O
2008–09	Kevin Durant	Oklahoma City Thunder	H–O–R–S
2009–10	Kevin Durant (2)	Oklahoma City Thunder (2)	H–O–R
2019–20	Mike Conley Jr.	Utah Jazz	H–O

== Multiple-time leaders ==
Rank	Player	Team	Times leader	Years
1	Kevin Durant	Oklahoma City Thunder	2	2008–09, 2009–10

== All-time participants ==
**Player** **(in bold text)**	Indicates the winner of the contest
Player (#)	Denotes the number of times the player has been in the contest

Season	Players
1977–78	**Paul Westphal**, Pete Maravich, Kevin Grevey, Maurice Lucas, Jo Jo White, Phil Smith, Bob McAdoo, John Drew, Terry Furlow, George Gervin
2008–09	**Kevin Durant**, Joe Johnson, O. J. Mayo
2009–10	Omri Casspi, **Kevin Durant** (2), Rajon Rondo
2019–20	Chauncey Billups (retired), Tamika Catchings (WNBA), **Mike Conley Jr.**, Zach LaVine, Chris Paul, Paul Pierce (retired), Allie Quigley (WNBA), Trae Young
