= Caspi =

Caspi may refer to:

- Variant transliteration of the Hebrew surname כספי, 'silver', see Kaspi (surname).

== Ancient people ==
- Caspians, an ancient Iranian people dwelling along the southern and southwestern shores of the Caspian Sea.

== Plants ==
- Botón caspi (Anthodiscus pilosus), a plant species found in Amazonian Colombia and Peru
- Cachimbo caspi (Couratari guianensis), a woody plant species found in South America
- Huaira caspi (Cedrelinga cateniformis), a plant species found in Peru
- Leche caspi (Couma macrocarpa), a tropical plant species native to tropical, humid Central and South America
- Caspi or zapallo caspi (Pisonia ambigua), a tree species native to Paraguay, Argentina and Brazil
