= Zilberman =

Zilberman is a surname. Notable people with the surname include:

- David Zilberman (economist) (born 1947), Israeli-American economist and professor
- David Zilberman (wrestler) (born 1982), Canadian Olympic freestyle wrestler
- David B. Zilberman (1938–1977), Russian-American philosopher and sociologist
- Hary Isac Zilberman (a.k.a. Haralamb Zincă 1923–2008), Romanian writer
- Menachem Zilberman (1946–2014), Israeli actor, comedian and songwriter
- Misha Zilberman (born 1989), Israeli Olympic badminton player
- Polina Zilberman (born 1969), German and Moldovan chess master
- Victor Zilberman, Romanian boxer
- Yaacov Zilberman (born 1954), Israeli chess master
- Yitzhak Shlomo Zilberman (1929-2001), Israeli rabbi, pioneer of the Zilberman Method in Jewish education

== See also ==
- Zilberman Method, teaching emphasizes rote learning of the text of the Torah from an early age
- Silberman
- Silverman
- Zylberman
