= Omri Casspi =

Israeli basketball player (born 1988)

Omri Casspi עומרי כספי
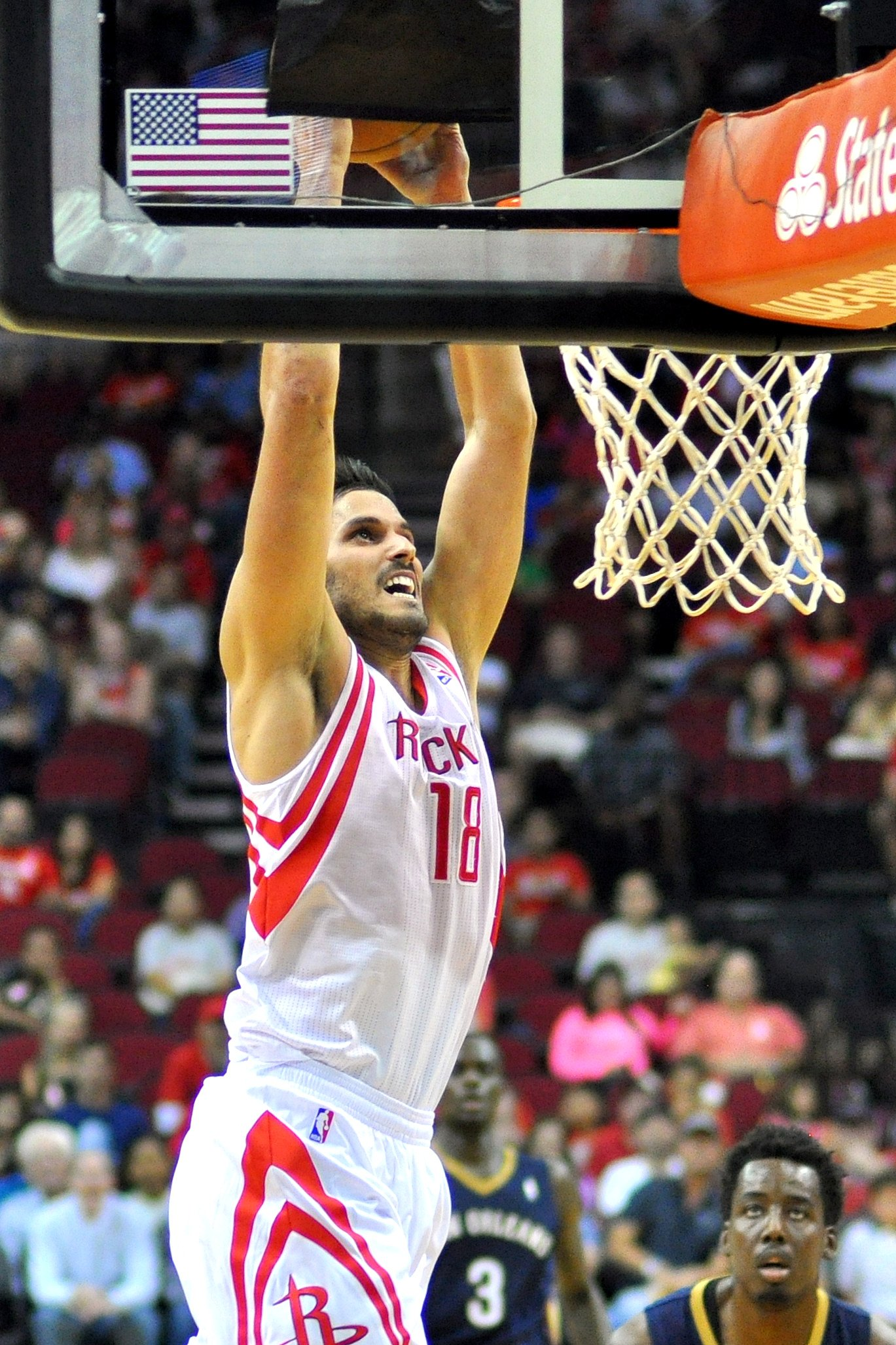
- Casspi dunks with the Rockets in 2013

Personal information
- Born: June 22, 1988 (age 38) Holon, Israel
- Listed height: 6 ft 9 in (2.06 m)
- Listed weight: 225 lb (102 kg)

Career information
- NBA draft: 2009: 1st round, 23rd overall pick
- Drafted by: Sacramento Kings
- Playing career: 2005–2021
- Position: Small forward / power forward
- Number: 7, 18, 36

Career history
- 2005–2009: Maccabi Tel Aviv
- 2006–2007: →Hapoel Galil Elyon
- 2009–2011: Sacramento Kings
- 2011–2013: Cleveland Cavaliers
- 2013–2014: Houston Rockets
- 2014–2017: Sacramento Kings
- 2017: New Orleans Pelicans
- 2017: Minnesota Timberwolves
- 2017–2018: Golden State Warriors
- 2018–2019: Memphis Grizzlies
- 2019–2021: Maccabi Tel Aviv

Career highlights
- 4× Israeli Basketball Super League champion (2006, 2009, 2020, 2021); 2× Israeli Basketball State Cup (2006, 2021); Israeli Super League Sixth Man of the Year (2008)

Career statistics
- Points: 4,642 (7.9 ppg)
- Rebounds: 2,355 (4.0 rpg)
- Assists: 662 (1.1 apg)
- Stats at NBA.com
- Stats at Basketball Reference

Omri Moshe Casspi (Hebrew: עומרי משה כספי; born June 22, 1988) is an Israeli former professional basketball player. He mainly played at the small forward position, but also played at the power forward position.

Casspi was drafted 23rd overall in the 2009 NBA draft by the Sacramento Kings, making him the first Israeli to be selected in the first round of an NBA draft. With his Kings debut in 2009, Casspi became the first Israeli to play in a National Basketball Association game. As a rookie, Casspi was chosen to participate in the NBA All-Star Weekend Rookie Challenge. The Cleveland Cavaliers traded for him in June 2011, and he signed with the Houston Rockets in July 2013. In July 2014, Casspi was traded to the New Orleans Pelicans as part of a three-team trade, but was later waived. He then returned to Sacramento prior to the 2014–15 season. In February 2017, he was traded to the Pelicans alongside DeMarcus Cousins, and signed with the Warriors during the offseason. Waived after an April injury, Casspi signed with Memphis in July 2018.

== Early life ==
Omri Casspi was born in Holon, Israel in 1988. He was raised in the city of Yavne, Israel. Casspi is the son of Shimon and Ilana, and has an older brother, Eitan, and a younger sister, Aviv. Both of his parents are Israeli-born and of Moroccan-Jewish descent. As an adult, Casspi added the middle name "Moshe" in memory of his grandfather.

As a child, Casspi played for junior programs at Elitzur Yavne and Maccabi Rishon LeZion. At age 13, he moved to the Maccabi Tel Aviv youth team, winning the State Youth championship in 2005.

Casspi is one of the few Jewish players to reach the NBA after Dolph Schayes, Ernie Grunfeld, Danny Schayes and Jordan Farmar, and he is the first one to have been born in Israel.

== Professional career ==
=== Maccabi Tel Aviv (2005–2006) ===
Having previously played for Maccabi Tel Aviv youth team, Casspi made his professional debut at age 17 with Maccabi Tel Aviv during the 2005–06 season. In his rookie season as a professional player, Casspi had averages of 4.2 points and 2.1 rebounds in 9.4 minutes per game in the Israeli Premier League.

=== Hapoel Galil Elyon (2006–2007) ===
In 2006, Casspi was loaned to Hapoel Galil Elyon for the 2006–07 season, going on to have a breakthrough season behind him. He averaged 11.1 points and 3.1 rebounds over 28 games. In April 2007, Casspi scored 14 points for the World Select team at the Nike Hoop Summit in Memphis.

=== Return to Maccabi Tel Aviv (2007–2009) ===
Casspi returned to Maccabi for the 2007–08 season. The team reached the EuroLeague Finals in 2008. He received the 2008 Israeli League Sixth Man of the Year award, averaging 10.4 points and 4.0 rebounds per game. In February 2009, Casspi finished in fourth place in voting for the FIBA Europe Young Men's Player of the Year Award for the 2008–09 season, behind Ricky Rubio, Danilo Gallinari and Kosta Koufos. Maccabi won a state championship in 2009. In the same season, Casspi's role in the team increased in the Israeli League, as well as in the EuroLeague. Over 27 league games, he averaged 12.8 points, 4.8 rebounds and 1.8 assists, all career-highs.

In 2008, Casspi declared himself eligible for the 2008 NBA draft, but he withdrew before the declaration deadline after failing to receive a first-round draft guarantee from any NBA club.

=== Sacramento Kings (2009–2011) ===
On June 25, 2009, Casspi was selected with the 23rd overall pick by the Sacramento Kings in the 2009 NBA draft, becoming the first Israeli player selected as a first-round draft pick. Not since Oded Kattash agreed to a contract with the New York Knicks in 1999 had an Israeli player come so close to playing in the NBA. On July 10, Casspi signed a multi-year deal with the Kings.

On October 28, 2009, Casspi made his NBA debut for the Kings against the Oklahoma City Thunder, scoring 15 points. On December 16, he made his first NBA start. Scoring 22 points against the Washington Wizards, Casspi tied the most points scored by any Kings player in his first start since the team moved to Sacramento in 1985.

On January 1, 2010, Casspi scored a then career-high 23 points against the Los Angeles Lakers (along with six rebounds, a steal, and three assists) as the Kings narrowly lost 109–108. The next day, he grabbed a career-high 11 rebounds against the Dallas Mavericks (along with 22 points, a steal, and four assists) as the Kings lost 99–91. On January 5, Casspi set a new career-high with 24 points against the Phoenix Suns (along with seven rebounds, an assist, no turnovers, and 10–19 from the field) as the Kings lost 113–109.

In February 2010, Casspi was chosen to participate in the NBA All-Star Weekend Rookie Challenge, as well as the NBA All-Star Weekend H–O–R–S–E Competition against Kevin Durant and Rajon Rondo.

In 2010–11, Casspi played in 71 games for Sacramento (starting 27 of them). He averaged 8.6 points, shot .412 shooting (including .372 from three-point range), and averaged 4.3 rebounds and 1.0 assists in 24.1 minutes per game. In his two seasons for Sacramento, Casspi averaged 9.5 points on .431 shooting, 4.4 rebounds, and 1.1 assists in 24.6 minutes per game.

=== Cleveland Cavaliers (2011–2013) ===
On June 30, 2011, Casspi was traded, along with a 2012 first-round draft pick, to the Cleveland Cavaliers in exchange for JJ Hickson.

=== Houston Rockets (2013–2014) ===
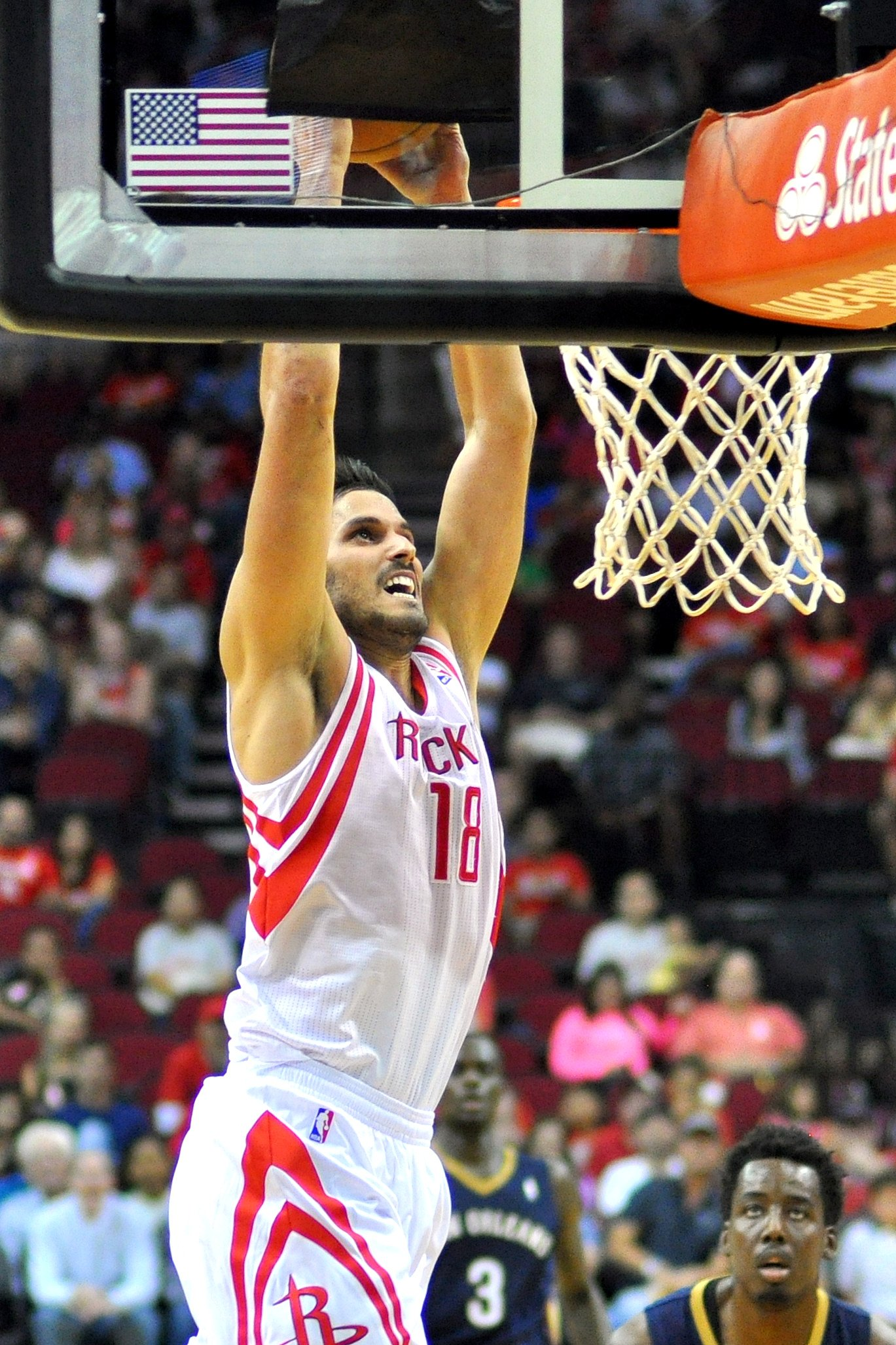
Casspi in October 2013

On July 16, 2013, Casspi signed a multi-year deal with the Houston Rockets. On November 1, for the first time Israelis on opposing NBA teams faced each other, as the Rockets played Gal Mekel and the Dallas Mavericks; the two were teammates on the Israelis Under 16, Under 18, and Under 20 teams, and on the Maccabi Tel Aviv junior team.

=== New Orleans Pelicans (2014) ===
On July 15, 2014, Casspi was traded from the Rockets to the New Orleans Pelicans in a three-team trade that also involved the Washington Wizards. Eight days later, he was waived by the Pelicans.

=== Return to Sacramento (2014–2017) ===
On September 18, 2014, Casspi re-signed with the Sacramento Kings. On April 7, 2015, he scored a then career-high 31 points on 12-of-20 shooting in a 116–111 victory over the Minnesota Timberwolves.

On July 14, 2015, Casspi re-signed with the Kings. On December 28, he scored a career-high 36 points in a 122–103 loss to the Golden State Warriors. In a three-pointer shootout duel with Stephen Curry, Casspi also tied Mike Bibby's team record with nine three-pointers.

While shooting 44.8 percent from outside of the arc, Casspi was being mentioned as a candidate for the All-Star Three-Point Contest.

=== Return to New Orleans (2017) ===
On February 20, 2017, Casspi and teammate DeMarcus Cousins were traded to the New Orleans Pelicans in exchange for Tyreke Evans, Buddy Hield, Langston Galloway, and 2017 first round and second-round draft picks. In his only game for the Pelicans three days later, Casspi broke his right thumb after scoring 12 points in the 129–99 loss to the Houston Rockets. Casspi was subsequently waived by the Pelicans on February 25 after being ruled out for four to six weeks.

=== Minnesota Timberwolves (2017) ===
On March 20, 2017, Casspi signed with the Minnesota Timberwolves.

=== Golden State Warriors (2017–2018) ===
On July 12, 2017, Casspi signed with the Golden State Warriors. On December 14, he posted his 17th career double-double with 17 points and a season-high 11 rebounds in a 112–97 victory over the Dallas Mavericks. On February 12, 2018, Casspi posted a season-high 19 points and 10 rebounds in a 129–83 victory over the Phoenix Suns.

On April 7, 2018, Casspi, being injured, was waived by the Warriors to make room for Quinn Cook on their playoff roster. Coach Steve Kerr explained: “We love Omri and what he brought to the team...It was difficult to sit with him and tell him we were going to do this." Without Casspi, the Warriors went on to win the 2018 NBA Finals against the Cleveland Cavaliers in a four-game sweep. Casspi subsequently received a championship ring from the Warriors for his contributions during the 2017–18 season.

=== Memphis Grizzlies (2018–2019) ===
On July 11, 2018, Casspi signed with the Memphis Grizzlies. Entering the 2018–19 season, he had yet to participate in the NBA playoffs, the NBA's longest active tenured player to have never played in a playoff game, ranking him number five overall in league history. Casspi finished the season ranking fourth on that list and first since the introduction of the three-point line. On February 1, 2019, he suffered a meniscus tear in his right knee and surgery was scheduled accordingly. Six days later, Casspi was waived by the Grizzlies.

=== Third stint with Maccabi Tel Aviv (2019–2021) ===
On August 13, 2019, Casspi returned to Maccabi Tel Aviv for a third stint, signing a three-year deal after playing ten seasons in the NBA. On November 1, 2019, Casspi was named Israeli Player of the Month after averaging 11.3 points, 5.5 rebounds, 3.0 assists and 1.8 steals in four games played in October.

=== Retirement ===
On July 18, 2021, Casspi announced his retirement from basketball.

== Career statistics ==
Legend
GP	Games played	GS	Games started	MPG	Minutes per game
FG%	Field goal percentage	3P%	3-point field goal percentage	FT%	Free throw percentage
RPG	Rebounds per game	APG	Assists per game	SPG	Steals per game
BPG	Blocks per game	PPG	Points per game	**Bold**	Career high

=== NBA ===
Year	Team	GP	GS	MPG	FG%	3P%	FT%	RPG	APG	SPG	BPG	PPG
2009–10	Sacramento	**77**	31	25.1	.446	.369	.672	4.5	1.2	.7	.2	10.3
2010–11	Sacramento	71	27	24.0	.412	.372	.673	4.3	1.0	.8	.2	8.6
2011–12	Cleveland	65	**35**	20.6	.403	.315	.685	3.5	1.0	.6	.3	7.1
2012–13	Cleveland	43	1	11.7	.394	.329	.537	2.7	.7	.6	.3	4.0
2013–14	Houston	71	2	18.1	.422	.347	.680	3.7	1.2	.6	.2	6.9
2014–15	Sacramento	67	19	21.1	.489	.402	**.733**	3.9	**1.5**	.5	.1	8.9
2015–16	Sacramento	69	21	**27.2**	.481	.409	.648	**5.9**	1.4	.8	.2	11.8
2016–17	Sacramento	22	2	18.0	.453	.379	.571	4.1	1.2	.5	.0	5.9
2016–17	New Orleans	1	0	24.0	.556	**.500**	.000	2.0	.0	.0	.0	**12.0**
2016–17	Minnesota	13	0	17.1	.487	.200	.625	1.5	.8	**1.0**	.2	3.5
2017–18	Golden State	53	7	14.0	**.580**	.455	.725	3.8	1.0	.3	**.4**	5.7
2018–19	Memphis	36	0	14.4	.534	.349	.672	3.2	.7	.6	.3	6.3
Career		588	145	20.3	.454	.368	.678	4.0	1.1	.6	.2	7.9

=== EuroLeague ===
Year	Team	GP	GS	MPG	FG%	3P%	FT%	RPG	APG	SPG	BPG	PPG	PIR
2005–06	Maccabi Tel Aviv	3	0	2.7	.000	.000	.500	.0	.0	.0	.0	.7	1.7
2007–08	Maccabi Tel Aviv	**20**	7	11.3	.545	.286	.600	2.1	.6	.3	**.3**	4.5	4.7
2008–09	Maccabi Tel Aviv	16	**8**	17.5	.505	**.450**	**.771**	3.1	.4	.8	.2	8.8	7.1
2019–20	Maccabi Tel Aviv	6	6	**21.2**	**.636**	.250	.560	**5.3**	**3.2**	**1.3**	.2	**12.0**	**18.3**
2020–21	Maccabi Tel Aviv	16	6	11.2	.448	.333	.579	2.4	0.8	0.3	**.3**	4.1	4.5
Career		61	27	13.5	.516	.346	.639	2.7	.8	.5	.2	6.1	6.6

== National team career ==
Casspi plays for the senior Israeli national team in international competition, and he was the team's captain at the 2015 EuroBasket.

== Off the court ==
=== Venture capital ===
In May 2022, Casspi launched a $50 million venture capital fund called Sheva. During his NBA career, Casspi was an angel investor in startups such as DocuSign and DayTwo.

=== Omri Casspi Foundation ===
Casspi runs the Omri Casspi Foundation, which every year sponsors trips backed by the National Basketball Players Association, for NBA players, WNBA players, and other celebrities, to Israel. In 2015, those joining Casspi included DeMarcus Cousins, Caron Butler, Chandler Parsons, Iman Shumpert and Tyreke Evans. The 2016 delegation included Jeremy Piven, Shawn Marion, Amar'e Stoudemire, Beno Udrih, Rudy Gay, Donald Sloan, Chris Copeland, Georges St-Pierre, Alysha Clark, Mistie Bass and Maria Ho.

== Honors ==
On July 6, 2017, Casspi was one of seven athletes to have been honored with participation in the torch lighting ceremony of the 2017 Maccabiah Games.

In 2025, Casspi was honored as one of the torchbearers in the national Israeli Independence Day ceremony.

== See also ==
- List of Jewish basketball players
