= Amir Caspi =

Solar Physicist

Amir Caspi is an American solar physicist based at the Southwest Research Institute in Boulder, Colorado. He is particularly known for his work on X-ray spectroscopy of the Sun and the solar corona, and for advancing the art of eclipse observations of the corona to improve scientific understanding.

Caspi is the Principal investigator of the CubeSat Imaging X-ray Solar Spectrometer (CubIXSS), a mission currently in development for NASA's Heliophysics Division. He has held major roles on several other CubeSats, including the predecessor Miniature X-ray Solar Spectrometer CubeSat (MinXSS).

Caspi's work on solar flares and solar X-ray emission includes important observations and statistical analyses of line and continuum emissions from ultra-hot solar flares, and extensive work on instrumentation and analysis techniques needed to advance understanding of coronal heating and solar flare dynamics. He is the Student Mentor for the Student Thermal and Energetic Activity Monitor (STEAM) instrument on the PUNCH mission scheduled to launch in 2025.

Caspi leads the Citizen CATE 2024 experiment to deploy distributed observing stations along the track of the April 8, 2024 North American solar eclipse, to observe the polarized solar corona in high resolution for a full hour. He is also noted for adapting NASA's WB-57 aircraft to obtain high altitude eclipse observations, both extending the length of eclipse observations and reducing the effects of Earth's atmosphere on the final data.
