= Mitchell D. Silber =

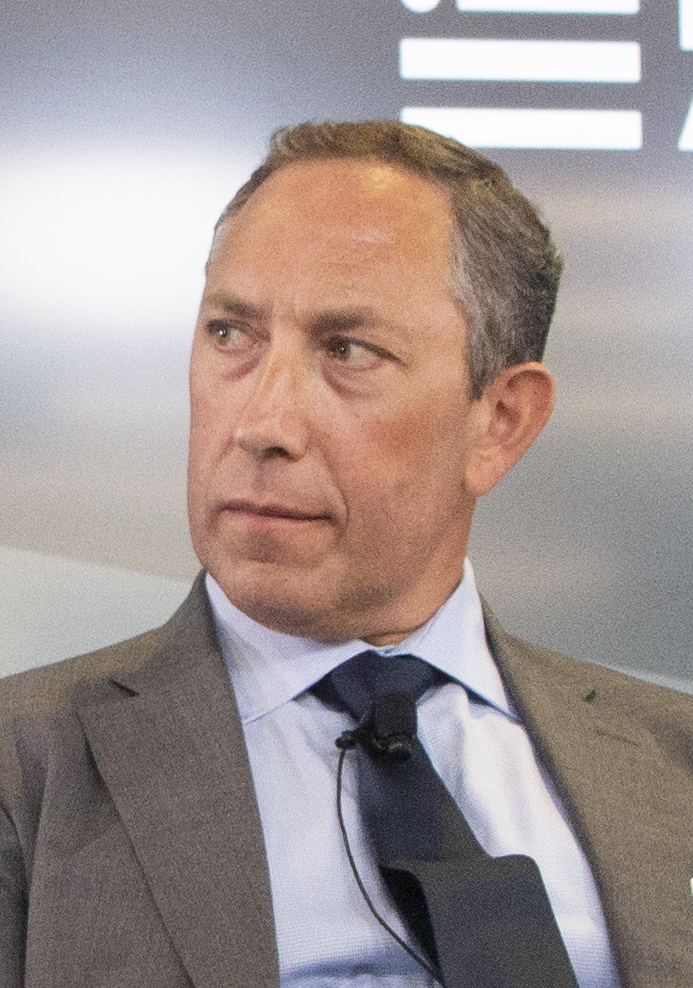
- Born: February 7, 1970 (age 56)

Mitchell Darrow Silber (born February 7, 1970) is the chief executive officer of the Community Security Initiative, a community based counterterrorism and security organization, originally created by the UJA-Federation of New York (UJA) and the Jewish Community Relations Council of New York (JCRC-NY), funded by The Paul E. Singer Foundation, Carolyn and Marc Rowan, and several other foundations, to help secure local Jewish institutions in the New York region. He is a professional global political risk, intelligence and security analyst and the former director of intelligence analysis at the New York City Police Department (NYPD). He is a regular commentator on political risk and terrorism related issues for both print and broadcast news outlets.

He is the author of a 2007 NYPD Intelligence Division report titled "Radicalization in the West: The Homegrown Threat," which laid the groundwork for a public policy debate about the growing concern for homegrown terrorism and was meant to serve as a tool for law enforcement to better understand how the process of homegrown radicalization to terrorism occurs. The report became controversial as some progressive and Muslim activist groups alleged that it served to legitimize surveillance of Muslims in the United States by law enforcement. Silber denies that was its purpose.

== Early life and education ==
Silber grew up in Atlantic Beach, New York and attended Lawrence High School, where he was the president of the student government. He graduated from the University of Pennsylvania as a dual major with a B.A. economics and European history. Later in his career, he went back to school and earned an M.A. in international affairs at School of International and Public Affairs, Columbia University (SIPA). Silber's concentration was on the Middle East and security policy. While at SIPA he led a graduate student task force that conducted a post 9/11 analysis of Saudi Arabia and its counter terrorist financing efforts for the Council on Foreign Relations Task Force on Saudi Arabia and Terrorism Financing.

== Corporate finance career ==
In 1993, after graduating from the University of Pennsylvania, Silber joined The Carson Group, a start-up capital markets intelligence consulting firm. There, Silber created an industry specific consulting practice focused on capital markets intelligence, corporate finance and the biotechnology sector. He advised CEOs, CFOs and senior management on financing strategies and provided insight on the capital markets. Silber also recruited, mentored and supervised an analytic team focused on the biotechnology sector.

Subsequently, he founded, with Wayne Rothbaum, Evolution Capital, a boutique investment bank, which was a Carson Group subsidiary. At Evolutional Capital, Silber was a principal, responsible for generating investment banking business and raised capital for both private and public biotech companies with hedge funds and venture capital funds.

Silber and his partners sold The Carson Group and Evolution Capital to Thomson Financial in September 2000 and stayed on board to manage the transition process following merger through 2002.

== Government ==
As the director of intelligence analysis for the New York City Police Department (NYPD) from 2007 to 2012, was a member of the police department's senior executive staff. He supervised the research, collection and analysis for the Intelligence Division's entire portfolio of ongoing terrorism related investigations. Silber was also responsible for building out and managing the Analytic, Cyber and Telephonic Analysis units and managing relations with foreign intelligence and law enforcement agencies.

Before assuming his position as director of intelligence analysis, Silber served as a special assistant to Deputy Commissioner of Intelligence, David Cohen, from 2005 to 2007. In that role, Silber was responsible for strategic assessments of emerging and future threats to New York City. He also served as an advisor on internal planning, development and new unit creation. Silber presented on behalf of the NYPD to the White House, the National Security Council, the Central Intelligence Agency, the Federal Bureau of Investigation, the National Counterterrorism Center and testified before the U.S. Senate and House of Representatives.

Silber co-authored the 2007 NYPD report "Radicalization in the West: The Homegrown Threat." In 2016, in settlement with the ACLU and other litigants, the New York Police Department agreed to remove the report from its website.

Silber is a visiting lecturer at SIPA, where he teaches a course on modern urban terrorism. He also serves on the dean's advisory board at SIPA and is a member of the Council on Foreign Relations.

Silber is the author of the book The Al Qaeda Factor: Plots Against the West, published in 2012 by the University of Pennsylvania Press.

== Countering violent extremism ==
Since 2017, Silber has worked with a former adversary, Jesse Morton, a one-time Columbia University student who had "fled to Morocco, was caught by local authorities, extradited to the U.S. and sentenced to 11 1/2 years in prison in 2012 for conspiring to solicit murder." Upon his release from prison, Morton founded Parallel Networks, a Virginia non-profit aimed at rehabilitating extremists. Silber is a director.

== Private sector consulting ==
Following the NYPD, Silber joined K2 Intelligence, a firm founded by Jules Kroll, as an executive managing director. There, he oversaw the Threat Intelligence and Data Analytics practice areas. After three years, Silber joined FTI Consulting and was the founder and head of the Geopolitical Intelligence practice. Silber is a founding partner of the intelligence and security firm, The Guardian Group, with former NYPD Police Commissioner, Raymond W. Kelly.

== Bibliography ==
- Radicalization in the West: The Homegrown Threat
- Who Will Defend the Defenders?
- Detect, Disrupt, and Detain: Local Law Enforcement’s Critical Roles in Combating Homegrown Extremism and the Evolving Terrorist Threat
- How the NYPD Foiled a Plot to Bomb the Subways
- Radicalized Overseas and Coming Home
- Guarding Against a Cyber 9/11
- Terrorist Attacks Against Jewish Targets in the West (2012-2019): The Atlantic Divide Between European and American Attackers
- How to Protect New York's Jews
