= Antonio Meeking =

American basketball player (born 1981)

Personal information
- Born: August 24, 1981 (age 45) Monroe, Louisiana
- Listed height: 6 ft 8 in (2.03 m)
- Listed weight: 248.6 lb (113 kg)

Career information
- High school: Farmerville (Farmerville, Louisiana)
- College: Louisiana Tech (1999–2003)
- NBA draft: 2003: undrafted
- Playing career: 2003–2011
- Position: Power forward

Career history
- 2003–2004: Asheville Altitude
- 2004–2005: Pennsylvania ValleyDawgs
- 2005: Hemofarm
- 2005: Asheville Altitude
- 2005–2006: Skyliners Frankfurt
- 2006: Hapoel Afula
- 2007: Sioux Falls Skyforce
- 2007: Skyliners Frankfurt
- 2008: Dallas Defenders
- 2008: Fabriano Basket
- 2008–2009: Reno Bighorns
- 2009: Albuquerque Thunderbirds
- 2009: Caciques de Humacao
- 2009–2010: Torku Selçuk Üniversitesi
- 2010–2011: Potros ITSON
- 2011: Dayton Air Strikers
- 2011: Piratas de Quebradillas

Career highlights
- Adriatic League champion (2005); First-team All-WAC (2003)

Antonio Meeking (born August 24, 1981) is an American former professional basketball player. He last played with Piratas de Quebradillas in Puerto Rico.
