= Zilber =

Zilber (Yiddish: זילבּער, Russian: Зильбер) is a surname and a variation of Silber. Notable people with the surname include:

- Amelie Zilber (born 2002), American actress, model and activist
- Ariel Zilber (אריאל זילבר; born 1943), Israeli musical artist
- Belu Zilber (1901–1978), Romanian communist activist
- Boris Zilber (born 1949), Soviet–British mathematician
- Irina Zilber (born 1983), Russian athlete
- J. A. Zilber, mathematician, known for the Eilenberg–Zilber theorem
- Maurice Zilber (1920–2008), French horse trainer
- Michael Zilber, Canadian composer and musician
- Yitzchok Zilber (1917–2004), Israeli-Russian rabbi
- Lev Zilber (1894–1966), Soviet microbiologist, virologist, and immunologist
