= Silberman =

Silberman or Silbermann is a German surname meaning "silver man". Notable people with the surname include:

== Silberman ==
- Benedict Silberman (1901–1971), composer and conductor
- Charles E. Silberman (1925–2011), American journalist
- Curt Silberman (1908–2002), attorney and member of Jewish organizations in Germany and the U.S.
- Jerome Silberman (1933–2016), American actor known professionally as Gene Wilder
- Laurence Silberman (1935–2022), American federal judge
- Linda J. Silberman, American lawyer
- Neil Asher Silberman (born 1950), archaeologist and historian
- Robert S. Silberman (born 1957), a U.S. Assistant Secretary of the Army
- Rosalie Silberman Abella (born 1946), Canadian jurist
- Serge Silberman (1917–2003), French film producer
- Steve Silberman, American journalist and author

== Silbermann ==
- Alphons Silbermann (1909–2000), German Jewish sociologist, musicologist, entrepreneur and publicist
- Ben Silbermann (born 1982), co-founder of Pinterest
- Gottfried Silbermann (1683–1753), German builder of pipe organs
  - Andreas Silbermann (1678–1734), German builder of pipe organs, older brother of Gottfried
  - Johann Andreas Silbermann (1712–1783), German builder of pipe organs, son of Andreas
- Heinrich Silbermann, Romanian chess master
- Jake Silbermann (born 1983), American actor who plays Noah Mayer on the soap opera As the World Turns

== Fictional characters ==
- Dr. Peter Silberman, fictional character from the Terminator franchise

== See also ==
- Silverman
- Victor Zilberman (born 1947), Romanian boxer
- Noam Zylberman (1987–1990), Canadian voice actor
- LEO (spacecraft) nicknamed Silvermann
