= Silverman =

Silverman may refer to:

== Surname ==
- Abraham George Silverman (1900–1973), American mathematician
- Allan Silverman (born 1955), American philosopher
- Anne Silverman, American biomechanical engineer
- Barry G. Silverman (born 1951), American federal judge
- Belle Miriam Silverman, better known as Beverly Sills (1929–2007), American singer
- Ben Silverman, American TV producer
- Ben Silverman (born 1987), Canadian professional PGA golfer
- Bernard Silverman (born 1952), British statistician
- Bernard Silverman (politician) (1838–1898), American politician
- Billy Silverman (born 1962), American pro wrestling referee
- Craig Silverman, Canadian journalist and media editor
- David Silverman (disambiguation), several people
- Debra T. Silverman, American biostatistician and cancer epidemiologist
- Edwin Silverman (1898–1970), American theatre owner and operator
- Erica Silverman, author of Big Pumpkin
- Fred Silverman (1937–2020), American TV executive and producer
- Jonathan Silverman (born 1966), American actor
- Joseph Silverman (1860–1930), American rabbi
- Joseph H. Silverman (born 1955), mathematician
- Joy Silverman (born 1947), American political bundler and socialite
- Julius Silverman (1905–1996), British politician
- Kaja Silverman (born 1947), American film critic
- Katie Silverman (born 2005), American former child actress
- Ken Silverman (born 1975), American game programmer
- Laura Silverman (born 1966), American actress
- Leonard Silverman (1930–2015), American politician and judge
- Louis Lazarus Silverman (1884–1967), American mathematician
- Matthew Silverman (born 1976), American General Manager and President for Baseball Operations for the Tampa Bay Rays
- Paul H. Silverman (1924–2004), American medical researcher
- Peter Silverman (1931–2021), Canadian journalist
- Robert Silverman (cycling activist) (1933–2022), Canadian cycling activist
- Robert Silverman (pianist) (born 1938), Canadian pianist
- Robert A. Silverman (born 1938), Canadian actor
- Ron Silverman (1932–2025), American actor, film and television producer and television writer
- Sam Silverman (1909–1977), American boxing promoter
- Sarah Silverman (born 1970), American comedian and actress
- Sidne Silverman (1898–1950), American publisher
- Sime Silverman (1873–1933), American newspaper publisher
- Steven Silverman (born 1954), American politician
- Susan Silverman (born 1963), American-Israeli Reform rabbi
- Syd Silverman (1932–2017), American owner and publisher of Variety magazine
- Sydney Silverman (1895–1968), British Labour politician
- Tracy Silverman (born 1960), American violinist, composer, and producer
- William Silverman (1917–2004), American pediatrician

== Other ==
- Silverman v. United States, 365 U.S. 505 (1961)
- Robinson, Silverman, Pearce, Aronsohn, and Berman, law firm in New York City, NY, US (1950–2003)
- Silverman–Toeplitz theorem
- Silverman's game, a problem in game theory
- Saving Silverman, a 2001 comedy film
- Songs for Silverman, an album by Ben Folds
