= Marie Saxon =

American actress (1904–1941)

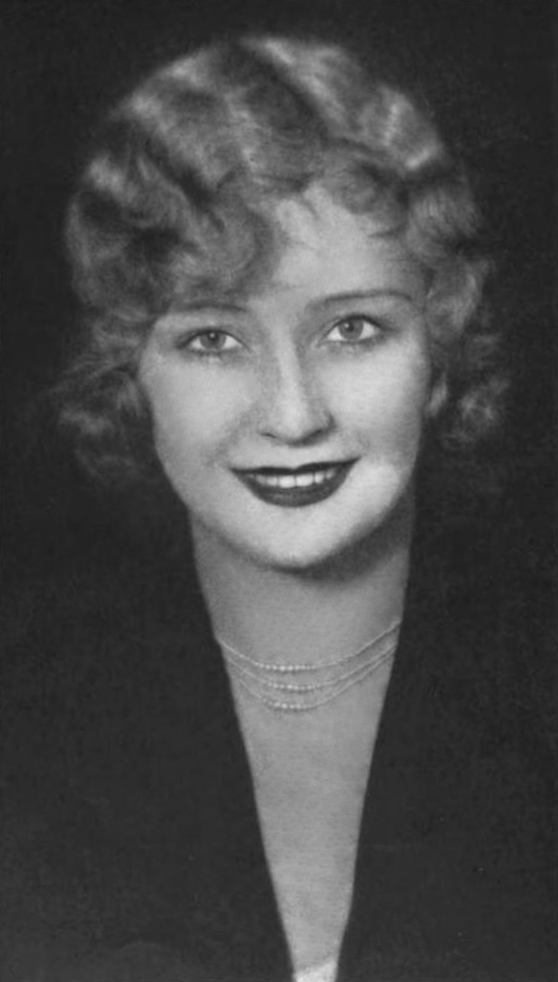
- Born: 1904; Lawrence, Massachusetts, U.S.
- Died: November 12, 1941 (aged 36–37); Harrison, New York, U.S.
- Occupations: Actress, dancer
- Spouse: Sidne Silverman
- Children: 1
- Mother: Pauline Saxon
- Relatives: Syd Silverman (son); Sime Silverman (father-in-law)

Marie Saxon (1904 – November 12, 1941) was an American actress in vaudeville and theatre, who briefly appeared in film.

== Biography ==
Pauline Marie Landry was born in Lawrence, Massachusetts. Her family were entertainers; her mother was vaudeville comedienne Pauline Saxon and her father, Daniel Landry, was a theatre manager.

Saxon embarked upon a career in musical theatre at 15. She performed in vaudeville, teaming with her mother in an act billed as the Saxon Sisters, before acting in stage musicals. She performed in Broadway musicals including My Girl (1924), The Ramblers (1926), Ups-A-Daisy (1928), Battling Buttler (1923), and Merry, Merry (1925). She was both a stage and film actress.

Saxon's films included The Broadway Hoofer (1929).

Saxon married Sidne Silverman, the publisher of Variety, an entertainment publication founded by his father, Sime Silverman, on May 31, 1924. They had a son, Syd Silverman, and they resided in Harrison, New York. Saxon died in Harrison on November 12, 1941, at age 37.
