= Headline =

Text at the top of a newspaper article

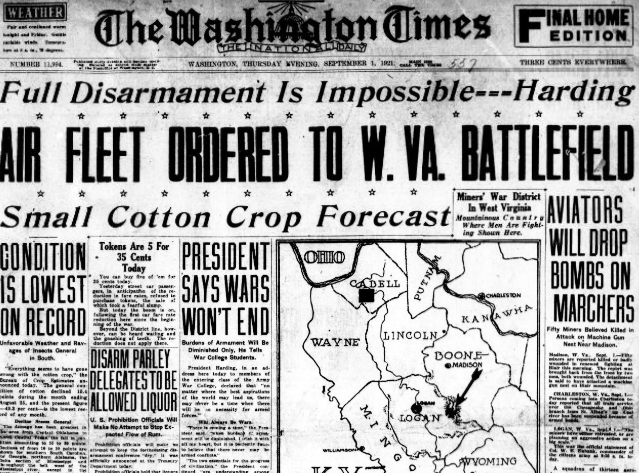
1921 headline in the Washington Times: "Airfleet Ordered to W. Va. Battlefield"

A headline is the text indicating the content or nature of the article below it, typically a news piece, by providing a form of brief summary of its contents. The large type front page headline did not come into use until the late 19th century when increased competition between newspapers led to the use of attention-getting headlines.

It is sometimes termed a news hed, a deliberate misspelling that dates from production flow during hot type days, to notify the composing room that a written note from an editor concerned a headline and should not be set in type.

Headlines in English often use a set of grammatical rules known as headlinese, designed to meet stringent space requirements by, for example, leaving out forms of the verb "to be" and choosing short verbs like "eye" over longer synonyms like "consider".

== Production ==
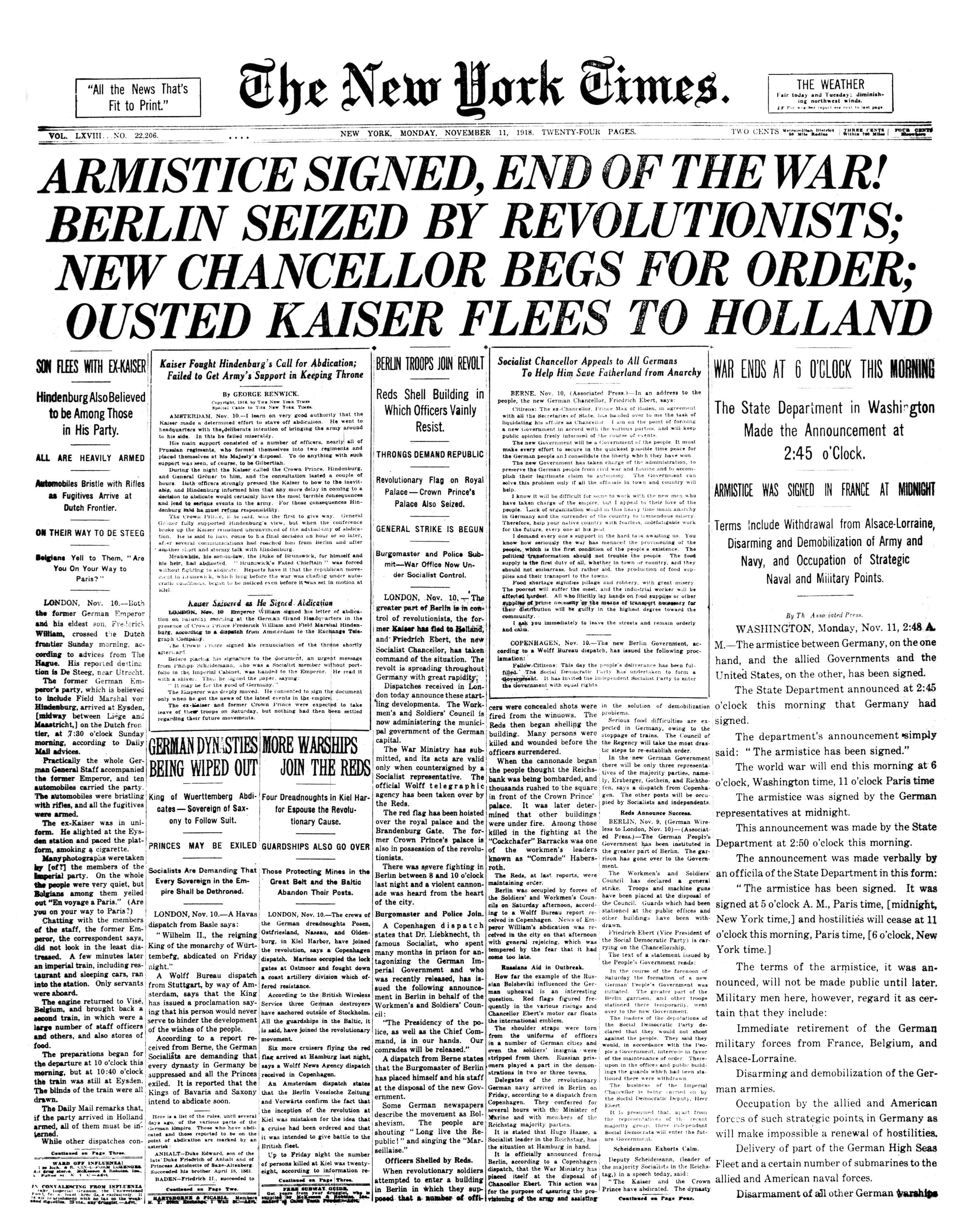
The New York Times uses an unusually large headline to announce the Armistice with Germany at the end of World War I.

A headline's purpose is to quickly and briefly draw attention to the story. It is generally written by a copy editor, but may also be written by the writer, the page layout designer, or other editors. The most important story on the front page above the fold may have a larger headline if the story is unusually important. The New York Times's 21 July 1969 front page stated, for example, that "MEN WALK ON MOON", with the four words in gigantic size spread from the left to right edges of the page.

Headlines may sometimes be divided into multiple "decks" of varying type size, each on a separate line. Grant Milnor Hyde notes that some historic headlines could contain up to twenty decks.

In the United States, headline contests are sponsored by the American Copy Editors Society, the National Federation of Press Women, and many state press associations; some contests consider created content already published, others are for works written with winning in mind.

== Typology ==
Research in 1980 classified newspaper headlines into four broad categories: questions, commands, statements, and explanations. Advertisers and marketers classify advertising headlines slightly differently into questions, commands, benefits, news/information, and provocation.

== Research ==
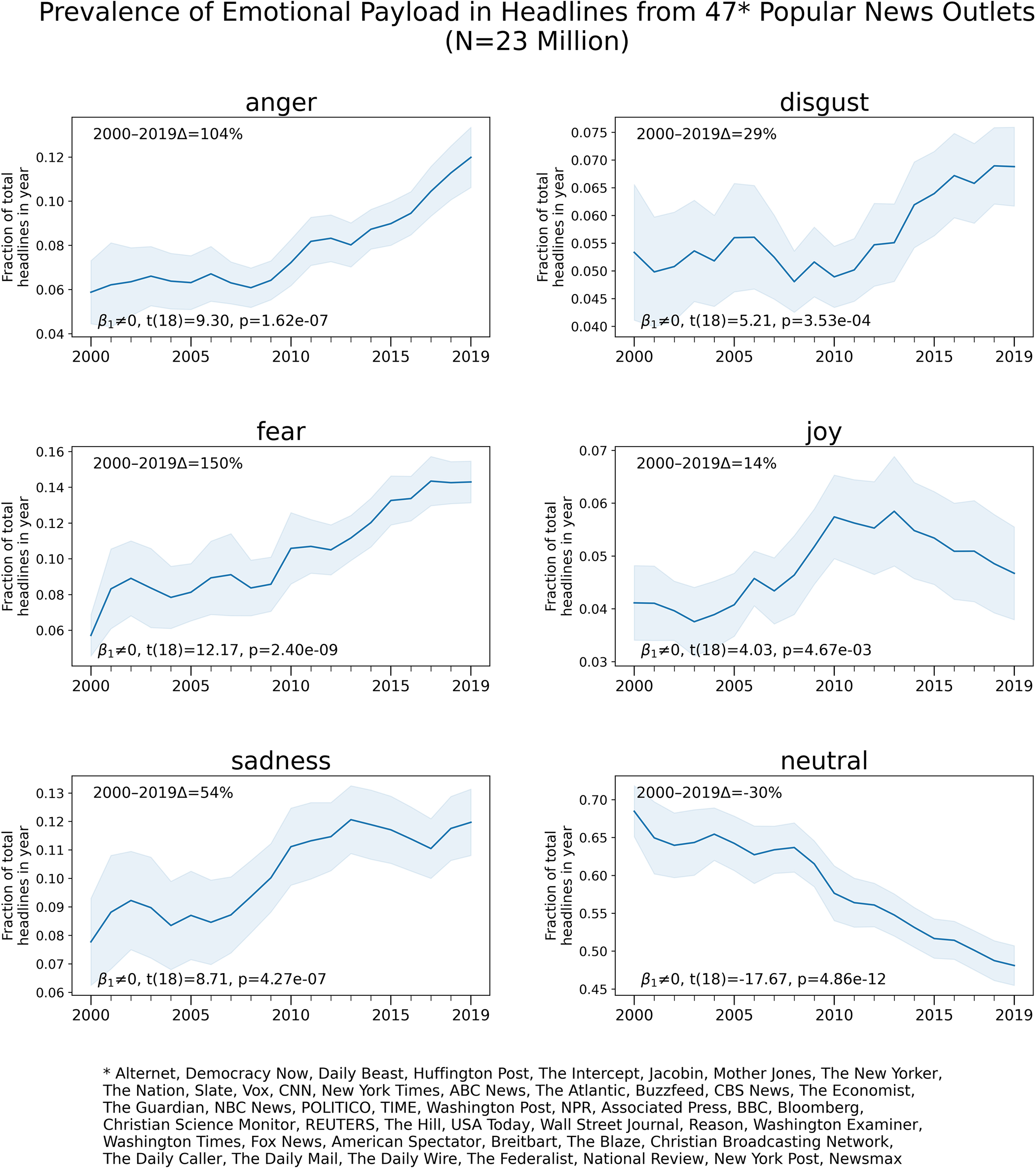
Emotionality in news articles headlines since 2000

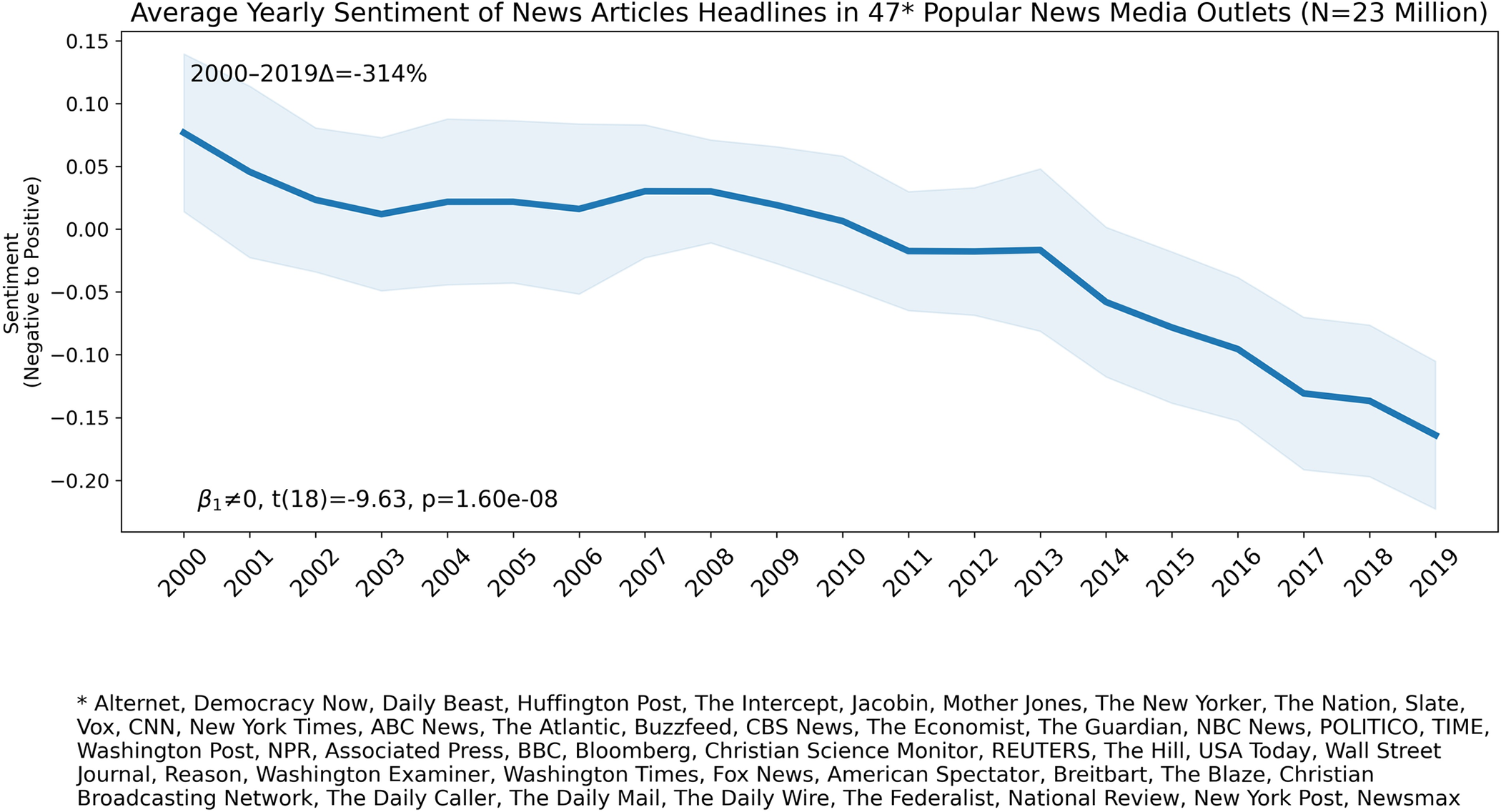
Average yearly sentiment of headlines across 47 popular news media outlets

A study indicates there has been a substantial increase of sentiment negativity and decrease of emotional neutrality in headlines across written popular U.S.-based news media since 2000.

Another study concluded that those who have gained the most experience with reading newspapers "spend most of their reading time scanning the headlines—rather than reading [all or most of] the stories".

Headlines can bias readers toward a specific interpretation and readers struggle to update their memory in order to correct initial misconceptions in the cases of misleading or inappropriate headlines.

One approach investigated as a potential countermeasure to online misinformation is "attaching warnings to headlines of news stories that have been disputed by third-party fact-checkers", albeit its potential problems include e.g. that false headlines that fail to get tagged are considered validated by readers.

== Criticism ==
=== Sensationalism, inaccuracy and misleading headlines ===
==== "Slam" ====
The use of "slam" in headlines has attracted criticism on the grounds that the word is overused and contributes to media sensationalism. The violent imagery of words like "slam", "blast", "rip", and "bash" has drawn comparison to professional wrestling, where the primary aim is to titillate audiences with a conflict-laden and largely predetermined narrative, rather than provide authentic coverage of spontaneous events.

=== Crash blossoms ===
"Crash blossoms" is a term used to describe headlines that have unintended ambiguous meanings, such as The Times headline "Hospitals named after sandwiches kill five". The word 'named' is typically used in headlines to mean "blamed/held accountable/named [in a lawsuit]", but in this example it seems to say that the hospitals' names were related to sandwiches. The headline was subsequently changed in the electronic version of the article. The term was coined in August 2009 on the Testy Copy Editors web forum after the Japan Times published an article entitled "Violinist Linked to JAL Crash Blossoms" (since retitled to "Violinist shirks off her tragic image").

== Headlinese ==
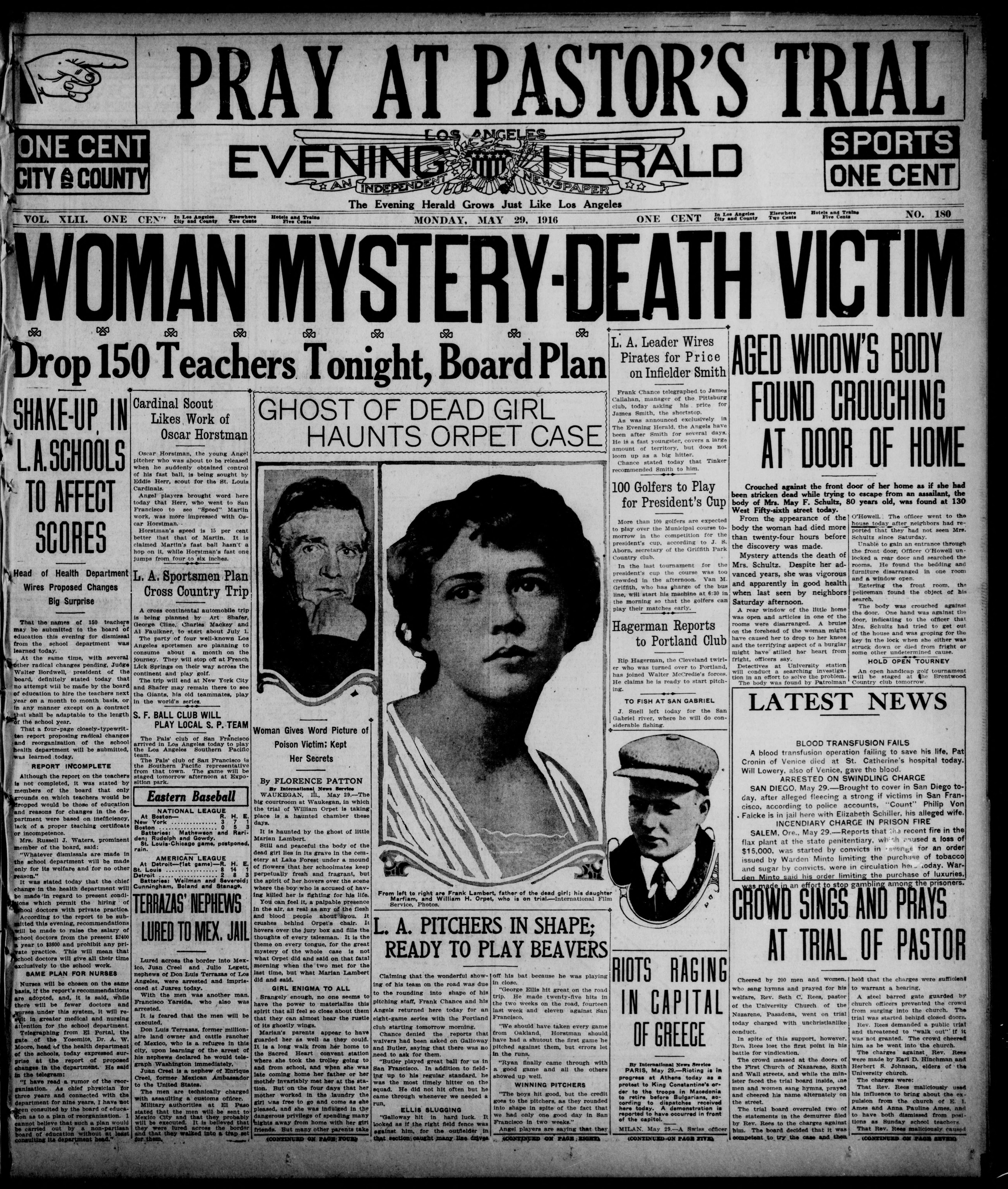
Headlinese being used on the front page of the Los Angeles Herald issue of May 29, 1916.

Headlinese is an abbreviated form of news writing style used in newspaper headlines. Because space is limited, headlines are written in a compressed telegraphic style, using special syntactic conventions, including:

- Forms of the verb "to be" and articles (a, an, the) are usually omitted.
- Most verbs are in the simple present tense, e.g. "Governor signs bill", while the future is expressed by an infinitive, with to followed by a verb, as in "Governor to sign bill"
- The conjunction "and" is often replaced by a comma, as in "Bush, Blair laugh off microphone mishap".
- Individuals are usually specified by surname only, with no honorifics.
- Organizations and institutions are often indicated by metonymy: "Wall Street" for the US financial sector, "Whitehall" for the UK government administration, "Madrid" for the government of Spain, "Davos" for the World Economic Forum, and so on.
- Many abbreviations, including contractions and acronyms, are used: in the UK, some examples are Lib Dems (for the Liberal Democrats), Tories (for the Conservative Party); in the US, Dems (for "Democrats") and GOP (for the Republican Party, from the nickname "Grand Old Party"). The period (full point) is usually omitted from these abbreviations, though U.S. may retain them, especially in all-caps headlines to avoid confusion with the word us.
- Lack of a terminating full stop (period) even if the headline forms a complete sentence.
- Use of single quotation marks to indicate a claim or allegation that cannot be presented as a fact. For example, an article titled "Ultra-processed foods 'linked to cancer'" covered a study which suggested a link but acknowledged that its findings were not definitive. Linguist Geoffrey K. Pullum characterizes this practice as deceptive, noting that the single-quoted expressions in newspaper headlines are often not actual quotations, and sometimes convey a claim that is not supported by the text of the article. Another technique is to present the claim as a question, hence Betteridge's law of headlines.
- A colon may be used to indicate the source of a claim, for instance: "Air Force Major Who Called for Trump’s Impeachment is in Solitary Confinement 24 Hours a Day: Attorney"

Some periodicals have their own distinctive headline styles, such as Variety and its entertainment-jargon headlines, most famously "Sticks Nix Hick Pix".

=== Verb heads ===
American headline writers sometimes left the grammatical subject out of a headline so that it began with a verb. The subject was either included in a lower deck, or even omitted entirely for the reader to infer. For example "Sues Doctor for $50,000" as the top deck of the headline, followed by "Woman Alleges He Caused Her Arrest on Charge of Insanity" in the second deck. Robert E. Garst and Theodore Menline Bernstein's 1933 manual Headlines and Deadlines described "the not infrequent omission of the grammatical subject in the top". The 1961 edition changed this to "the occasional omission". Both editions called the construction "somewhat short of being ideal". From the 1950s onward, editing textbooks referred to them as "verb heads" and noted that some papers used them while others banned them. In 1972 John B. Bremner stated they had declined in use due to wider columns. He noted however that some large papers were still using them, including The Des Moines Register and The Kansas City Star, and that The New York Times still allowed them if the subject was included at the start of a lower deck.

=== Commonly used short words ===
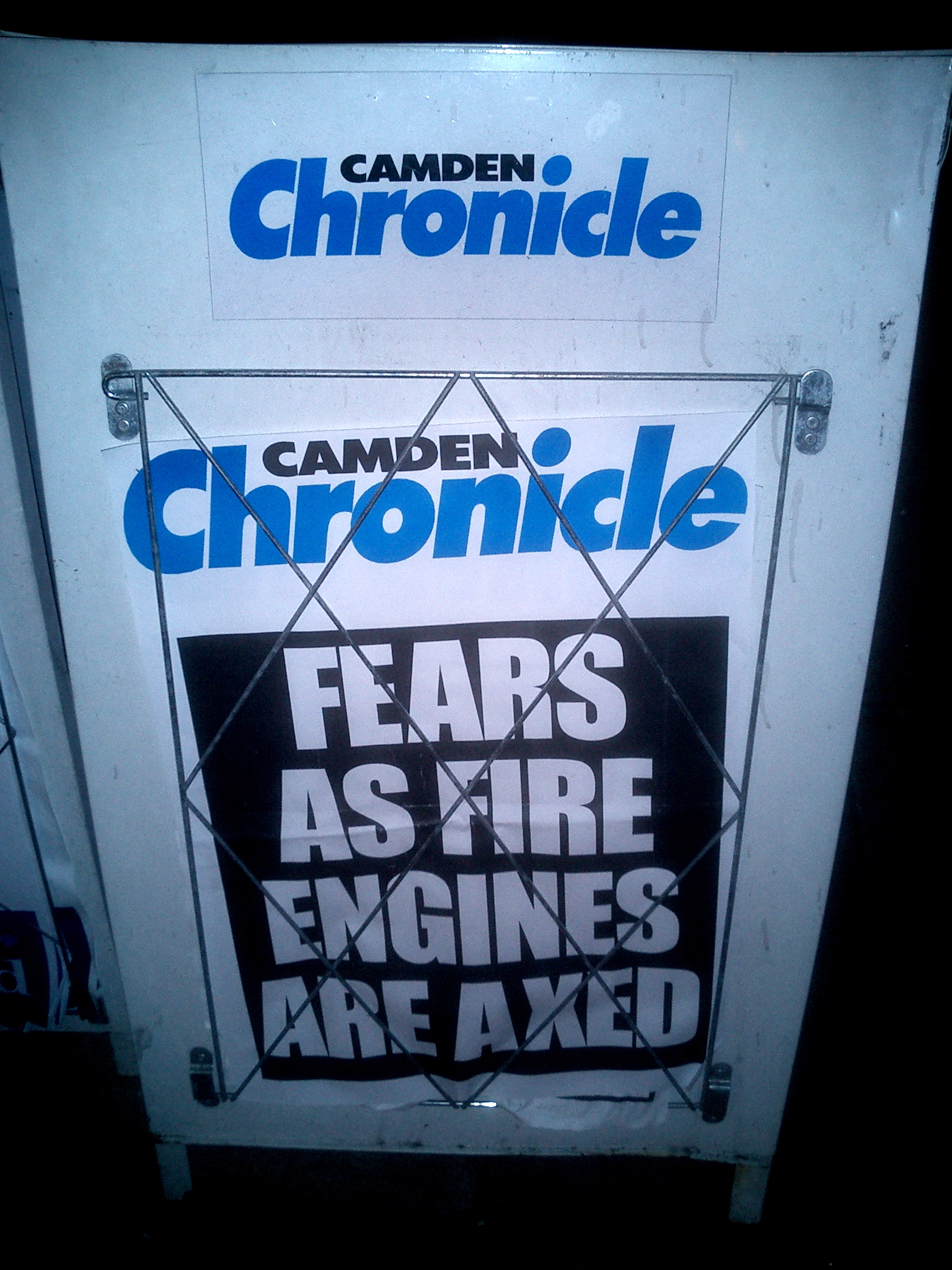
A headline of short words from a 2004 London newspaper: "Fears As Fire Engines Are Axed"

To save space and attract attention, headlines often use extremely short words, many of which are not otherwise in common use, in unusual or idiosyncratic ways:

- ace (a professional, especially a member of an elite sports team, e.g. "England ace")
- axe (to eliminate)
- bid (to attempt)
- blast (to heavily criticize)
- cagers (basketball team – "cage" is an old term for indoor court)
- chop (to eliminate)
- coffer(s) (a person or entity's financial holdings)
- confab (a meeting)
- eye (to consider)
- finger (to accuse, blame)
- fold (to shut down)
- gambit (an attempt)
- hail (to praise, welcome)
- hike (to increase, raise)
- ink (to sign a contract)
- jibe (an insult)
- laud (to praise)
- lull (a pause)
- mar (to damage, harm)
- mull (to contemplate, consider)
- nab (to acquire, arrest)
- nix (to reject)
- pan (to criticize, review negatively)
- parley (to discuss)
- pen (to write)
- probe (to investigate; investigation)
- quiz (to question, interrogate)
- raft (package, series; e.g. "raft of new powers to tackle crime")
- rap (to criticize)
- romp (an easy victory or a sexual encounter)
- row (an argument or disagreement)
- rue (to lament)
- see (to forecast)
- shape (to be healthy or fit)
- slay (to murder)
- slam (to heavily criticize)
- slump (to decrease)
- snub (to reject)
- solon (to judge)
- spat (an argument or disagreement)
- spark (to cause, instigate)
- star (a celebrity, often modified by another noun, e.g. "soap star")
- tap (to select, choose)
- tot (a child)
- tout (to put forward)
- woe (disappointment or misfortune)

== Famous examples ==
- "Wall Street Lays an Egg" – Variety employing the idiom lay an egg (meaning "fail badly") at the height of the Wall Street crash (1929)
- "Sticks Nix Hick Pix" – Variety writing that rural moviegoers preferred urban films (1935)
- "Dewey Defeats Truman" – Chicago Tribune incorrectly reporting the winner of the U.S. presidential election (1948)
- "Ford to City: Drop Dead" – New York Daily News reporting the denial of a federal bailout for bankrupt New York City (1975)
- "Mush from the Wimp" – The Boston Globe editorial criticizing statements from then-president Jimmy Carter, added by staff as a joke and mistakenly printed (1980)
- "Headless Body in Topless Bar" – New York Post on a local murder (1983)
- "Sick Transit's Glorious Monday" – New York Daily News reporting an agreement to avoid public transit fare increases, a pun on the Latin phrase sic transit gloria mundi meaning "thus passes the glory of the world" (1979)
- "Gotcha" – The UK Sun on the torpedoing of the Argentine ship Belgrano and sinking of a gunboat during the Falklands War (1982)
- "Freddie Starr Ate My Hamster" – The UK Sun claiming that the comedian had eaten a fan's pet hamster in a sandwich, later proven false (1986)
- "Great Satan Sits Down with the Axis of Evil" – The Times (UK) on US–Iran talks (2007)
- "Super Caley Go Ballistic, Celtic are Atrocious" – Sun on Caley Thistle beating Celtic F.C. in the Scottish Cup, a pun on supercalifragilisticexpialidocious (2000)
- "We are Pope!" (in German: Wir sind Papst!) – Bild on the election of Pope Benedict XVI, a German (2005)

In 1986, The New Republic editor Michael Kinsley held a contest to find the most boring newspaper headline after seeing "Worthwhile Canadian Initiative" over a New York Times column by Flora Lewis. Submissions, for which "the entire staff [was] comatose with appreciation," included "Economist Dies" in the Wisconsin State Journal and "Prevent Burglary by Locking House, Detectives Urge" in the Boston Globe. In 2003, New York Magazine published a list of eleven "greatest tabloid headlines".

On 22 June 1978, The Guardian ran an article with the headline "Foot hits back on Nazi comparison". Reader David C. Allan of Edinburgh responded with a letter to the editor, which the paper ran on 27 June. Decrying the headline's apparent pun, Allan suggested that, if Foot were in future to be appointed Secretary of State for Defence, The Guardian might cover it under the headline "Foot Heads Arms Body". The belief later gained currency that The Times actually had run the headline. The headline does not, however, appear in The Times Digital Archive.

== See also ==
- A-1 Headline, a 2004 Hong Kong film
- Betteridge's law of headlines – Journalistic adage on questions in headlines
- Bus plunge, a type of news story, and accompanying headline
- Copy editing
- Corporate jargon
- Crosswordese, words common in crosswords that are otherwise rarely used
- Dateline – Piece of news text
- Ellipsis (linguistics), omission of words
- Headlines (from The Tonight Show with Jay Leno)
- Lead paragraph
- Nut paragraph – Opening paragraph of a news story
- Syntactic ambiguity, leads to multiple humorous possible alternative interpretations of written headline
- Title (publishing) – Name of a published text or work of art
- Zero copula - stylized defective syntax typically used by newspaper headlines
