= Mush from the Wimp =

Joke headline for a 1980 Boston Globe op-ed

"Mush from the Wimp" was a joke headline at the top of an editorial in The Boston Globe that accidentally passed through to publication in 1980.

== Headline ==
On March 15, 1980, The Boston Globe ran an editorial that began:

Certainly it is in the self-interest of all Americans to impose upon themselves the kind of economic self-discipline that President Carter urged repeatedly yesterday in his sober speech to the nation. As the President said, inflation, now running at record rates, is a cruel tax, one that falls most harshly upon those least able to bear the burden.

The editorial was not particularly critical of Carter, but was given the headline "Mush from the Wimp". In The Washington Post's telling: "They crafted a fine editorial generally supporting the president's newly announced anti-inflation program and then, well, someone must have started horsing around and the next thing you knew there was the lead editorial in Saturday's Globe bearing the startling headline ... ". The headline was corrected to read "All must share the burden" during the print run, but only after 161,000 copies had already gone to circulation. (Note: The Washington Post gives the number at 140,000.)

== Aftermath ==
The phrase had been created by Globe editorial writer Kirk Scharfenberg; in 1982, he wrote an op-ed piece discussing it. Scharfenberg had felt that Carter's speech was "wishy-washy" and it left him "not much impressed". "I meant it as an in-house joke and thought it would be removed before publication", he explained. "It appeared in 161,000 copies of the Globe the next day." Scharfenberg also noted the use of "wimp" as a popular political insult afterwards. He remained with the Globe until his death in 1992 from cancer at age 48.

A month after the headline was published, Theo Lippman Jr. of The Baltimore Sun declared "Mush from the Wimp" as being "on its way to becoming one of the most famous headlines of our time". He placed it behind "Wall St. Lays an Egg" (Variety, 1929) and ahead of "Ford to City: Drop Dead" (New York Daily News, 1975).

The phrase became well known enough that in 1995, a Globe editorial chastising Iditarod Race sponsors for caving in to pressure from animal rights activists was titled "More wimps from the mush".

The New York Post used "Mush from the wimp", with credit to Scharfenberg, as the title of an opinion column published on June 20, 2013, criticizing President Barack Obama following a speech in Berlin.
