= John Bremner (disambiguation) =

John Bremner may refer to:

- John Bremner (1833–1887), Scottish explorer of Alaska
- John B. Bremner (1920–1987), Australian-American journalist and professor
- John M. Bremner (1922–2007), Scottish-American soil scientist and professor at Iowa State University
