= Betteridge's law of headlines =

Journalistic adage on questions in headlines

Betteridge's law of headlines is an adage that states: "Any headline that ends in a question mark can be answered by the word no." It is based on the assumption that if the publishers were confident that the answer was yes, they would have presented it as an assertion; by presenting it as a question, they are not accountable for whether it is correct or not.

The law is named after Ian Betteridge, a British technology journalist who wrote about it in 2009. The maxim has been cited by other names since 1991, when a published compilation of Murphy's law variants called it "Davis's law", a name that also appears online without any explanation of who Davis was. It has also been referred to as the "journalistic principle" and in 2007 was referred to in commentary as "an old truism among journalists".

== History ==
Betteridge's name became associated with the concept after he discussed it in a February 2009 article, which examined a previous TechCrunch article that carried the headline "Did Last.fm Just Hand Over User Listening Data to the RIAA?":

This story is a great demonstration of my maxim that any headline which ends in a question mark can be answered by the word "no". The reason why journalists use that style of headline is that they know the story is probably bullshit, and don't actually have the sources and facts to back it up, but still want to run it.

A similar observation was made by British newspaper editor Andrew Marr in his 2004 book My Trade, among Marr's suggestions for how a reader should interpret newspaper articles:

If the headline asks a question, try answering 'no'. Is This the True Face of Britain's Young? (Sensible reader: No.) Have We Found the Cure for AIDS? (No; or you wouldn't have put the question mark in.) Does This Map Provide the Key for Peace? (Probably not.) A headline with a question mark at the end means, in the vast majority of cases, that the story is tendentious or over-sold. It is often a scare story, or an attempt to elevate some run-of-the-mill piece of reporting into a national controversy and, preferably, a national panic. To a busy journalist hunting for real information a question mark means 'don't bother reading this bit'.

== Studies ==
A 2016 study of a sample of academic journals (not news publications) that set out to test Betteridge's law and Hinchliffe's rule (see below) found that few titles were posed as questions and of those that were questions, few were yes/no questions and they were more often answered "yes" in the body of the article rather than "no".

A 2018 study of 2,585 articles in four academic journals in the field of ecology similarly found that very few titles were posed as questions at all, with 1.82 percent being wh-questions and 2.15 percent being yes/no questions. Of the yes/no questions, 44 percent were answered "yes", 34 percent "maybe", and only 22 percent were answered "no".

In 2015, a study of 26,000 articles from 13 news sites on the World Wide Web, conducted by a data scientist and published on his blog, found that 766 of them (2.95 percent) ended in a question mark. Of those 766, the majority (54 percent) were yes/no (polar) questions, which divided into 20 percent "yes" answers, 17 percent "no" answers and 16 percent whose answers he could not determine; the rest (46 percent) were non-polar questions.

== Question headlines ==
Phrasing headlines as questions is a tactic employed by newspapers that do not "have the facts required to buttress the nut graph". Roger Simon characterized the practice as justifying "virtually anything, no matter how unlikely", giving "Hillary to Replace Biden on Ticket?" and "Romney to Endorse Gay Marriage Between Corporations?" as hypothetical examples of such a practice. Many question headlines were used, for example, in reporting of Bharatiya Janata Party in-fighting in 2004, because no politicians went on record to confirm or deny facts, such as "Is Venkaiah Naidu on his way out?" Because this implication is known to readers, guides giving advice to newspaper editors state that so-called "question heads" should be used sparingly.

Freelance writer R. Thomas Berner calls them "gimmickry". Grant Milnor Hyde observed that they give the impression of uncertainty in a newspaper's content. When Linton Andrews worked at the Daily Mail after the First World War, one of the rules set by Lord Northcliffe was to avoid question headlines, unless the question itself reflected a national issue.

Question headlines are not legally sound when it comes to avoiding defamation. The Supreme Court of Oklahoma held in 1913, in its decision in Spencer v. Minnick, that "A man cannot libel another by the publication of language the meaning and damaging effect of which is clear to all men, and where the identity of the person meant cannot be doubted, and then escape liability through the use of a question mark." The use of question headlines as a form of sensationalism has a long history, including the 9 June 1883, headline in Joseph Pulitzer's New York World, "Was It Peppermint Mary?" The story, about a jewellery store that had tried to prevent its female employees from flirting with people outside the store, only mentioned "Peppermint" Mary at the end of the piece as an employee who might possibly have caused this and did not answer the question.

The New York World also famously used a question headline for hedging when editors were unsure of their facts, when it reported the outcome of the 1916 United States presidential election. When other New York City newspapers ran statement headlines on 8 November 1916 saying "Hughes Is Elected" (The Evening Sun, final edition the night before), "Hughes Is Elected by Narrow Margin" (The Sun), "Hughes Is Elected by Majority of 40" (The New York Herald), "Hughes the Next President" (The Journal of Commerce), "Hughes Sweeps State" (New York Tribune) and "Nation Swept by Hughes!" (New York American), the World ran one with a question headline, "Hughes Elected in Close Contest?"

This was the result of a last-minute intervention by then World journalist Herbert Bayard Swope, who, having received a tip from gambling friends that Charles Evans Hughes might not in fact win, persuaded Charles M. Lincoln, the managing editor of the paper, to reset the headline in between editions, inserting a question mark. Confusingly, below the question headline the World still had a picture of Hughes captioned "The President-Elect" but the question headline did indeed turn out to have the answer "no", as President Woodrow Wilson was re-elected, which the World finally announced in a headline two days later.

Advertisers and marketers prefer yes/no question headlines that are answered "yes", as a reader that immediately answers "no" to a question headline on an advertisement is likely to skip over the advertisement entirely. The most famous example of such a question headline in advertising is "Do you make these mistakes in English?", written to advertise Sherwin Cody's English-language course and used from 1919 to 1959, which (with readers answering "yes" they did make the mistakes that the advertisement proceeded to outline) was measured as more successful than non-yes/no-question alternatives.

Victor Schwab, a partner in the advertising agency that worked for Cody, published an analysis of the aspects of the headline attempting to look at it scientifically and using ten years' worth of revenue and customer enquiry data for both it and a statement headline that Cody had also used. He noted amongst other things that working in its favour was the question addressing the reader using the second person. A 2013 study into computer-mediated communication came to a similar conclusion, finding that question headlines posted to Twitter and eBay increased click-through rates in comparison to statement headlines and that questions that address or reference the reader have statistically significant higher click-through rates than rhetorical or general questions.

The adage does not apply to questions that are more open-ended than strict yes–no questions. For example, "What Should We Expect From Evolving Import-Export Policy?" is an open-ended question, whereas "Should We Expect an Embargo on Widgets?" is of closed form.

== Hinchliffe's rule ==
In the field of particle physics, the concept is known as Hinchliffe's rule, after physicist Ian Hinchliffe, who stated that if a research paper's title is in the form of a yes–no question, the answer to that question will be "no". The adage led into a humorous attempt at a liar paradox in a 1988 paper, written by physicist Boris Kayser under the pseudonym "Boris Peon", which bore the title: "Is Hinchliffe's Rule True?", which was followed up in 2015 by a more rigorous article by computer scientist Stuart Shieber titled "Is This Article Consistent with Hinchliffe’s Rule?".

== See also ==
- Bullshit § Assertions of fact
- Clickbait – Web content intended to entice users to click on a link
- Headlinese – Strange phrasing of headlines
- List of eponymous laws – Adages and sayings named after a person
- Loaded question – Question containing an unjustified assumption
