= Hy Hollinger =

American journalist

Herman "Hy" Hollinger (September 3, 1918 – October 7, 2015) was an American trade journalist and studio publicist. He covered the entertainment industry for both Variety (1953–1960, 1979–1992) and The Hollywood Reporter (1992–2008) during a career which spanned seven decades. Hollinger helped to developed a new system for tracking the overseas box office while working for Variety's London bureau. He later served as the international editor at The Hollywood Reporter from 1992 until 2008, when he retired at the age of 90. Hollinger was considered an expert on the international box office and the sale independent productions directly to foreign film distributors.

== Biography ==
=== Early life ===
Hollinger was born Herman Hollinger in The Bronx, New York City, on September 3, 1918. He attended Townsend Harris High School in Queens, New York. He worked as a messenger and copy boy in the classified ad department at the New York Times on Saturdays from 1932 to 1935 as a high school student. During college, Hollinger landed an internship at CBS Radio, which included a position assisting CBS' coverage of the 1940 Republican National Convention in Philadelphia. Hollinger graduated from City College of New York and received a master's degree from the Columbia School of Journalism.

=== Career ===
He served in the Armed Forces Radio from 1942 to 1945 during World War II. Following the end of the war, Hollinger wrote for a weekly newspaper in suburban Philadelphia and worked as a sports reporter for the now defunct New York Morning Telegraph.

Hollinger departed The Morning Telegraph to take a job as a publicist at Warner Bros. He next joined Variety, the weekly entertainment trade magazine, from 1953 to 1960. While working under Variety's London bureau chief Don Grove, Hollinger co-developed a new system for tracking the overseas box office, which had been difficult to follow at the time.

Hollinger then returned to public relations as a publicity director for Paramount Pictures' International Telemeter Company, an experimental pay television operation, which existed during the 1950s and 1960s. He was later promoted, first to Paramount's European production publicity director, based in London, and then to Paramount's "ad-pub", or Vice President of Marketing. He worked on some of Paramount's best known productions of the era, including the 1970 film, Love Story.

During the early 1970s, Hollinger left Paramount Pictures following a change in the studio's leadership. He worked in corporate public relations, beginning in 1972. His clients included the National Basketball Players Association and Sagittarius Productions, owned by Edgar Bronfman, Sr., the head of Seagram at the time.

In Midtown Manhattan in the late 1970s, Hollinger had a chance encounter with Syd Silverman, his former boss at Variety during the 1950s, and Robert Hawkins, another executive at Variety. That unintended meeting with Silverman and Hawkins led to Hollinger rejoining the staff of Variety in 1979 as an associate editor focused on international issues within the entertainment industry. At the time of Hollinger's hiring, Variety, based in New York City, and Daily Variety, based in Hollywood, essentially operated as distinct, separate media entities. The decision to hire Hollinger in 1979 marked "the first time in many years that weekly Variety will have its own editorial presence in the film capital," according to a story later published at the time.

Hollinger broke the story in 1980 that the jury at the Cannes Film Festival, chaired that year by Kirk Douglas, had been surprised that a French film, My American Uncle, had been awarded the Grand Prix by Cannes' organizers, despite the fact that the jury had rejected the film as the winner.

Hollinger also reported on the widespread dissatisfaction with the Cannes Film Festival and MIFED (Mercato internazionale del film e del documentario), a now defunct film market held annually in Milan. International film merchants, based in Los Angeles, had to attend Cannes and MIFED, to sell their films to overseas markets during the 1970s and early 1980s. At the time, there were no comparable venues to sell U.S. films to the world markets held in the United States. His reports on the foreign sales monopolies held by Cannes and MIFED led to the establishment of the American Film Market (AFM) in 1981. Hollinger's work has been credited with the need an American alternative to Cannes and MIFED. Robert Meyers, a founding member and first chairman of the American Film Market, recalled asking other film executives, "Why are we all going to Cannes just to sell the American independent film, and why not right here in the U.S.?", after reading a series of Hollinger's stories in Variety. The American Film Market, one of the film industry's leading marketplaces, is now held annually in Santa Monica, California.

In 1992, Hollinger left Variety, to become the international editor of The Hollywood Reporter. Hollinger served as The Hollywood Reporter's international editor from 1992 until 2008, when he retired at the age of 90.

Hy Hollinger died at Olympia Medical Center in Los Angeles, California, on October 7, 2015, at the age of 97. Hollinger's wife of 61 years, actress Gina Collens, died on May 31, 2014, at the age of 90. He was survived by their daughter, Alicia Hollinger, an artist and illustrator.
