= Harrison's Reports and Film Reviews =

Book reprint of Harrison's Reports magazine

Harrison's Reports and Film Reviews is the 15-volume reprint of the complete run of the weekly magazine Harrison's Reports from its founding in 1919 to its demise in 1962. Volumes 1 through 14 are facsimile reprints of the more than 2,000 weekly issues. The reprints were edited by D. Richard Baer and published 1992-1995 by Hollywood Film Archive.

== Film review index ==
Volume 15 is an alphabetical index of the films reviews, approximately 17,000 in all. Films are also indexed by alternate titles and original foreign language titles.

Over 99% of the reprints were reproduced from original issues, the rest from photocopies or microfilm blowups. The index volume includes a two-page narrative titled “A Brief History of these Reprints” about how all the issues were gathered.

== Volumes and years covered ==
Volume	Date Range	ISBN
1	1919–1922	978-0-913616-11-6
2	1923–1925	978-0-913616-12-3
3	1926–1928	978-0-913616-13-0
4	1929–1931	978-0-913616-14-7
5	1932–1934	978-0-913616-15-4
6	1935–1937	978-0-913616-16-1
7	1938–1940	978-0-913616-17-8
8	1941–1943	978-0-913616-18-5
9	1944–1946	978-0-913616-19-2
10	1947–1949	978-0-913616-20-8
11	1950–1952	978-0-913616-21-5
12	1953–1955	978-0-913616-22-2
13	1956–1958	978-0-913616-23-9
14	1959–1962	978-0-913616-24-6
15	Index 1919-1962	978-0-913616-25-3
set	15 volumes	978-0-913616-10-9

== Volume summaries ==
At the front of each volume is a one-page summary of the more important issues discussed in the editorials of that period.

== Original indexes reprinted ==
Harrison's Reports published its own index up to eight times per year. In the reprint volumes, these indexes are printed on yellow paper at the beginning of each calendar year's gathered reprints of 52 (occasionally 53) weeks of issues.

== Index of shorts ==
Although Harrison's Reports reviewed only feature films, not shorts, the indexes included lists of forthcoming and recently released shorts, grouped by releasing company. Published separately from these reprints, An Index to Short Subjects Listed in Harrison’s Reports 1926-1962 by Gerald Jones (self-published November 2004) is a complete alphabetical index of all the shorts and cartoons listed in the many separate indexes. This index used to be available online.

== Critical review ==
The review by Library Journal stated, “Taken in its 43-year entirety, Harrison's Reports is a very useful reflection of the industry's major trends and provides something of a social history of the United States as well.”

== Other reprints of film reviews ==
Harrison’s Reports is one of the three English-language periodicals with 10,000 or more film reviews reprinted in book form. The other two are

- Variety as Variety Film Reviews (1907–1996) in 24 volumes.
- The New York Times as The New York Times Film Reviews (1913–2000) in 22 volumes.
