= New York Clipper =

New York City–based weekly entertainment newspaper (1853–1924)

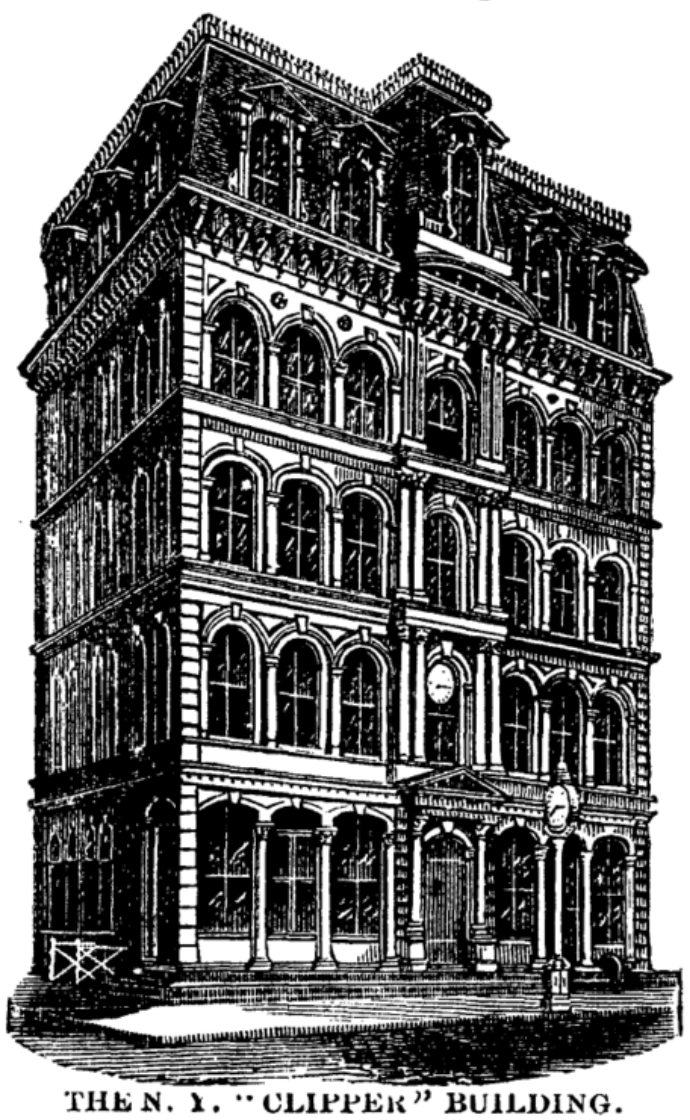
- New York Clipper building, 1876
- Type: Weekly entertainment newspaper
- Founded: 1853
- Ceased publication: 1924
- Language: English
- Headquarters: New York City, 88-90 Centre Street
- Free online archives: New York Clipper at the Illinois Digital Newspaper Collections, University of Illinois at Urbana–Champaign University Library

The New York Clipper, also known as The Clipper, was a weekly entertainment newspaper published in New York City from 1853 to 1924. It covered many topics, including circuses, dance, music, the outdoors, sports, and theatre. It had a circulation of about 25,000. The publishers also produced the yearly New York Clipper Annual. In 1924, The Clipper was absorbed into the entertainment journal Variety.

== History ==
Frank Queen began publishing the New York Clipper in 1853, making it the first American paper devoted entirely to entertainment; the paper eventually shortened its name to The Clipper. The paper was one of the earliest publications in the United States to regularly cover sports, and it played an important role in popularizing baseball in the country. In addition to more popular sporting events, the New York Clipper also wrote about billiards, bowling, even chess. It began covering American football in 1880. In 1894, however, The Clipper dropped its sports coverage and devoted itself entirely to theatre.

In addition to entertainment, The Clipper regularly published short satirical pieces written in exaggerated dialects such as African American English or the speech of the New York Bowery b'hoys. For example, this letter is from a fictitious Irish travel writer named "Shamus McFudd":

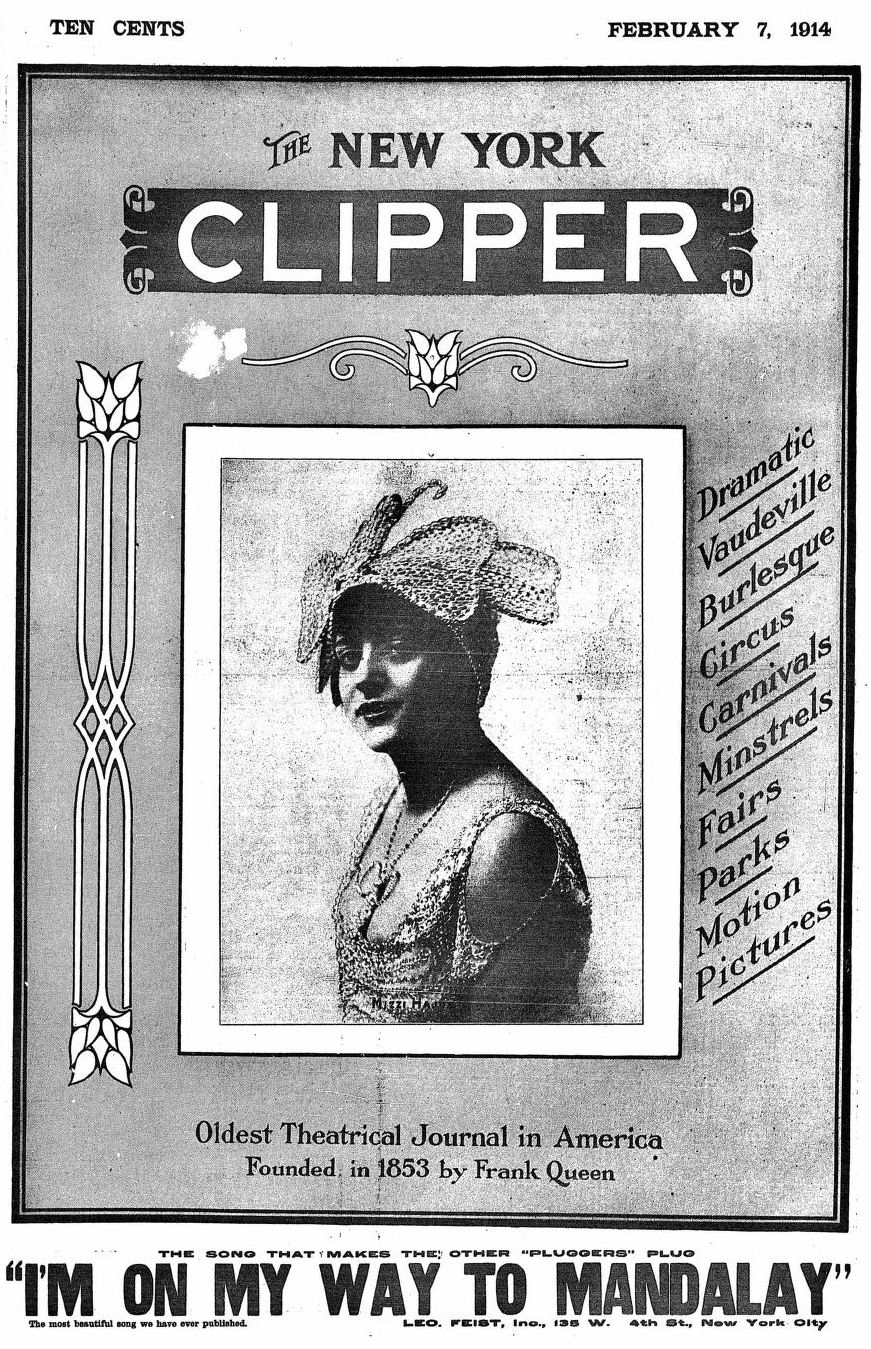
Cover of the New York Clipper from February 7, 1914

After me an Tim had seen the illiphant, an exhamined his trunk to see how many klane shurts he had, we wint to see a grate big snake, wid a body the size iv a whale, a tail that wud wind 3 times around Pat Clansey's cow stable. Och! sich a monster I niver want to clap me ises on agin. His mouth was so big that he cud take me an Tim at wan swaller widout openin it at all; and when his 2 jaws cum together, the Whole house wud shake as it is had a fit iv the ager. They feed him on broiled pavin stones, an whin he takes dhrink, feth he laves the river so dhry that all the ships ran aground. The divil a wurd iv a lie I'm telling ye.

The Clipper was the paper of record for the circus business from its founding until about 1902 when the Billboard overtook it in coverage. For most of its life the paper carried a circus section and contained both classified and display advertising for circuses. It remains the single best news source for the circus in the second half of the 19th century, and is essential to circus historians. It had its competitors for circus news including the Sporting and Theatrical Journal, the New York Mercury, and the Dramatic News, all of which covered circuses to a greater or lesser degree. The Clipper is also an important source for minstrel shows and popular theater.

Music publishing house Leo Feist Inc. acquired the Clipper as part of a bad debt but it performed poorly and in 1922, Sime Silverman, the publisher of the Clipper's rival newspaper Variety, acquired the Clipper and folded it 2 years later.

Today, the New York Public Library and the Library of Congress possess nearly complete collections of the newspaper. Many other research libraries have microfilm copies. Many issues are available online at fultonhistory.com, an archive of historical newspapers from New York, in the University of Illinois digital newspaper collection and at archive.org.

== See also ==
- New York Dramatic Mirror
- Illustrated Sporting and Dramatic News
- The Morning Telegraph
- Variety
