= The Broadway Hoofer =

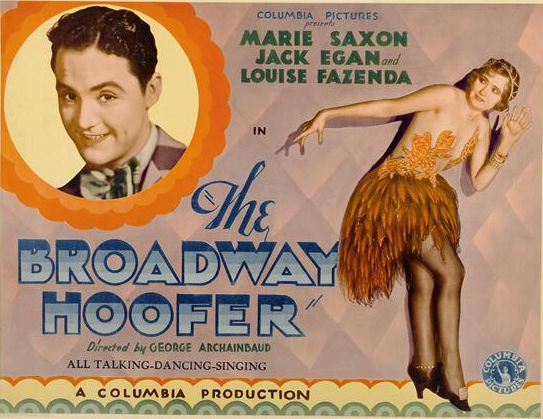
- Movie poster
- Directed by: George Archainbaud
- Written by: Gladys Lehman
- Produced by: Harry Cohn
- Starring: Marie Saxon; Jack Egan; Louise Fazenda
- Cinematography: Joseph Walker
- Edited by: Maurice Wright
- Production company: Columbia Pictures
- Release date: December 27, 1929
- Running time: 63 minutes
- Country: United States
- Language: English

The Broadway Hoofer is a 1929 all-talking musical film directed by George Archainbaud. The film stars Louise Fazenda, and Marie Saxon. The film was released under the title Dancing Feet in the United Kingdom.

== Plot ==
Adele Dorey (Marie Saxon), Broadway's most dazzling dancing star, closes a triumphant season utterly exhausted. She is so worn from the endless strain of rehearsals and performances that she barely makes it through her last show. Backstage, her manager Larry (Howard Hickam) excitedly brings her the blueprint for her next production. Adele, craving escape, refuses even to discuss it. She also brushes off the advances of Morton (Ernest Hilliard), her wealthy, persistent suitor.

When the curtain falls, Adele does the unthinkable: she vanishes from New York without a word, taking only her loyal maid Jane (Louise Fazenda). The two retreat to a sleepy country town where the only excitement is the daily arrival of the train. Adele, hiding her identity, soaks in the peace and simplicity.

Her quiet retreat is soon disrupted by the arrival of “The Gay Girlies Burlesque Company” on a barnstorming tour. The locals swarm the little opera house, especially when Bobby Lewis (Jack Egan)—the troupe's manager, press agent, and leading man—announces auditions for a new chorus girl. Every type of girl crowds in: plump, skinny, tall, short, young, and middle-aged, with hopeful mothers hovering. Out of curiosity, Adele slips into the crowd.

Before she can slip away, the tide of applicants pushes her onto the stage. Bobby, spotting her poise and beauty, refuses to let her leave. Amused, Adele plays along, watching the would-be chorines strut and stumble. At last, Bobby insists on her turn. To his delight—and the audience's—Adele dances with dazzling grace. Bobby immediately offers her the job, insisting she has promise if he trains her.

Feigning naiveté, Adele gives her name as “Lucy Brown” and claims her strict mother will never allow her to travel with a burlesque troupe. Bobby insists on pleading her case in person. At Adele's cottage, Jane—startled—finds herself introduced as “Mother Brown.” She reluctantly consents to Adele's “opportunity,” on the condition that she accompany her as a chaperone.

Weeks on tour pass. Adele throws herself into the part of a second-rate chorus girl, enjoying the absurdity of it all. More importantly, she and Bobby fall in love. Her identity hidden, she savors being loved simply as a woman, not as a star. Jane, however, grows concerned: Adele is discarding her Broadway career for the affection of a burlesque hoofer.

At Glens Falls, New York, the troupe is discovered. Larry and Morton, tracing Adele's whereabouts, slip into the audience. They recognize her at once, stunned and amused at her masquerade. After the show, Adele confronts them, begging them not to reveal her identity to Bobby. Instead, she praises Bobby's raw talent, urging Larry to give him a chance.

Larry offers Bobby a Broadway contract. Elated, Bobby insists that “Lucy” come with him. But Morton, scheming to rid himself of the rival, privately tells Bobby the truth—that “Lucy Brown” is actually Adele Dorey, a famous star laughing at his earnestness. Crushed, Bobby refuses the offer and denounces Adele.

Adele returns to New York and begins rehearsals for Larry's new revue. But her sparkle is gone. Once the brightest star on Broadway, she now moves indifferently through the numbers, her heart clearly elsewhere. Larry, a seasoned showman, knows the production will fail unless her spirit returns.

Larry learns that Bobby is working in a local nightclub. He arranges a party there and compels Adele to attend. At first listless, Adele's eyes light up when Bobby is announced. But his performance, once filled with snap, is flat and joyless. Then, as he sings a number from The Gay Girlies Burlesque Show - a duet once shared with her, Adele can no longer resist. She joins him onstage, and together they rekindle the old spark. The audience erupts in applause.

Larry again offers Bobby a Broadway engagement. This time Bobby refuses, still bitter. But Adele steps forward, publicly declaring her love: if Bobby won't join the show, she will resign too—because “a wife must follow her husband.” It is the first time she reveals her true feelings. Bobby takes her into his arms and kisses her passionately before the delighted nightclub crowd. The hoofer and the Broadway star are reconciled, partners in life and love, ready to dance their way forward together.

== Cast ==
- Marie Saxon as Adele Dorey
- Jack Egan as Bobby Lewis
- Louise Fazenda as Jane Brown
- Howard Hickam as Larry
- Ernest Hilliard as Morton
- Gertrude Short as Annabelle
- Eileen Percy as Dolly
- Charlotte Merriam as Mazie
- Fred Mackaye as Billy

== Music ==
The following songs were featured in this film: "I Live To Love Only You" by Mack Gordon and Max Rich; "Oh, So Sweet," by Abner Silver and George Wagner; "Mediterranean Moon" by Buddy Valentine, Robert A. King and Ted Fiorito; "Hawaiian Love Song" by Ballard MacDonald and Dave Franklin.

== Reception ==
Billboard praised Saxon's performance, but called the songs "mediocre".
