= David Silverman =

David Silverman may refer to:

- David Silverman (animator) (born 1957)
- David Silverman (activist) (born 1966), American activist and former president of American Atheists
- David Silverman, a mathematician known for Silverman's game
- David P. Silverman (born 1943), American Egyptologist
