= Sticks Nix Hick Pix =

Famous 1935 headline from Variety newspaper

"Sticks Nix Hick Pix" is a headline printed in Variety, a newspaper covering Hollywood and the entertainment industry, on July 17, 1935, over an article about the reaction of rural audiences to movies about rural life. Variety was known for its playful use of Broadway and Hollywood jargon to pack as much meaning as possible into a small headline or article; examples include "H'wood" and "biz".

Using a form of headlinese that the newspaper called "slanguage", "Sticks Nix Hick Pix" means that people in rural areas ("the sticks") reject ("nix") motion pictures ("pix") about rural people ("hicks"). The accompanying article is based on an interview with Joe Kinsky, who operated theaters in the mostly rural Tri-State circuit of Illinois, Iowa and Nebraska. Kinsky claims that "Farmers are not interested in farming pictures", and that two recent pictures set in an upper-class milieu, The Barretts of Wimpole Street and The Scarlet Pimpernel, had been big successes with his demographic.

According to Spanish writer and journalist Peter Besas (author of the 2000 book Inside "Variety": The Story of the Bible of Show Business, 1905–1987), the headline was written by Variety editor-in-chief Abel Green.

Because it was the lead headline of the paper, it was printed in all capital letters. Standard style for other Variety headlines was initial capital letters on almost all words.

== Mentions and similar headlines ==
"STICKS NIX HICK PIX" is a frequently-cited headline, although references often get it slightly wrong.

It is used as an example of space constraint-driven "headlinese" in Garner's Modern American Usage.

Down the years, some of journalism’s most famous headlines have brilliantly suggested what happened and have coaxed the reader to find out more: Wall Street Lays An Egg, Ford to New York: Drop Dead, Headless Torso Found in Topless Bar, HICKS NIX PIX IN STICKS [sic]

— Hugh Mulligan

Similar headlines have appeared in publications such as the Chicago Tribune ("HIX PIX CLIX", 1988), the New York Times ("Hicks Nix Blix Fix", 2002; "Hicks Nix Climate Fix", 2013), and the New York Daily News ("HICKS NIX KNICKS TIX", 2000).

The 1942 movie Yankee Doodle Dandy features a scene where George M. Cohan (played by James Cagney) explains the headline (misquoted "STIX NIX HIX PIX") to some students, leading to an impromptu dance.

== Parodies ==
Parodies of the headline include The Simpsons episode "Colonel Homer", which shows "Hix in Stix Love Chix Lix" as a headline on the Springfield Variety; "Crix Pix Crucifix Schticks" as quoted by Monsignor O'Hara in the musical Sister Act; "Sick Pic Nixes Brit Crit" as a fictional Variety headline in Jonathan Coe's 1997 novel The House of Sleep; and "Nix Pix Shplix Queen" in the film The Naked Gun. The fictional Variety headlines "Pix Tix Nix Mix" and "Boff Noff Toff Toff" appear in the Mel Brooks film Silent Movie. David Burdett titled his 1984 novel Hix Nix Stix Pix.

== See also ==
- Varietyese
