= Abel Green =

American journalist and editor (1900–1973)

- Born: June 3 1900; New York, United States
- Died: May 10 1973; Manhattan, United States
- Education: New York University
- Occupation: Journalist
- Known for: Editor of Variety

Abel Green (June 3, 1900 – May 10, 1973) was an American journalist best known as the editor of entertainment magazine Variety for forty years. Its founder Sime Silverman first hired Green as a reporter in 1918, and Green's byline first appeared on May 30, 1919.

== Biography ==
=== Early life ===
Green was born in New York, the son of Seymour A. Green and Berta Raines. He attended Stuyvesant High School, but dropped out of New York University.

=== Publishing ===
The first time his signature appeared in Variety was in the May 30, 1919, issue, when he reviewed the film Playthings of Passion, signing it "Abel". By 1925 he penned a column in the music section headed "Abel's Comment". Later, in 1928 he wrote a weekly column in Variety called "Around New York" and one called "Radio Rambles".

After Silverman died in 1933, Green took over as editor of Variety. Green was responsible for the creation of much of Variety's characteristic jargon, including the 1935 headline "Sticks Nix Hick Pix"; in his obituary, Time said that if Variety was the Bible of show business, then Green "was its King James". In 1951, Green collaborated with Joe Laurie Jr. on Show Biz: From Vaude to Video, a history of show business. He also edited The Spice of Variety in 1952, a compilation of Variety articles.

Green co-wrote the 1933 film Mr. Broadway with Ed Sullivan. He appeared in the 1947 film Copacabana.

== Personal life and death ==
He married Grace Fenn on June 3, 1921, and was married for 52 years. Like Silverman, Green always wore a bowtie.

He died of a heart attack at his home at 55 Central Park West.

== Bibliography ==
- Inside "Variety": The Story of the Bible of Show Business (1905-1987) by Peter Besas. Madrid: Ars Millenii, 2000.
- God Wears a Bow Tie: A Novel of Show Business by Lyle Stuart. New York: Greenberg, 1949.
