= Variety Obituaries =

Obituaries published by the magazine Variety from 1905 to 1994

- Language: English
- Publisher: Garland Publishing
- Publication date: 1988
- Publication place: India
- Media type: Print

Variety Obituaries is a 15-volume series with facsimile reprints of the full text of every obituary published by the entertainment trade magazine Variety from 1905 to 1994. The first eleven volumes were published in 1988 by Garland Publishing, which subsequently became part of Routledge.

== Information ==
Information for each deceased person can include the following:

- Date, place and cause of death.
- Birthdate and birthplace.
- Birth names, nicknames, aliases and other names used by celebrities.
- Education.
- Military record.
- Film, television and stage appearances.
- Awards.
- Career narrative.

== Volumes and years covered ==
VARIETY OBITUARIES
Volume	Date Range	ISBN
1	1905–1928	978-0-8240-0835-2
2	1929–1938	978-0-8240-0836-9
3	1939–1947	978-0-8240-0837-6
4	1948–1956	978-0-8240-0838-3
5	1957–1963	978-0-8240-0839-0
6	1964–1968	978-0-8240-0840-6
7	1969–1974	978-0-8240-0841-3
8	1975–1979	978-0-8240-0842-0
9	1980–1983	978-0-8240-0843-7
10	1984–1986	978-0-8240-0844-4
11	1905–1986 Index	978-0-8240-0845-1
12	1987–1988	978-0-8240-0846-8
13	1989–1990	978-0-8240-0847-5
14	1991–1992	978-0-8240-0848-2
15	1993–1994	978-0-8240-0849-9

== Indexes ==
Volume 11 is the alphabetical index for 1905 to 1986. It contains approximately 120,000 names. There are multiple entries for some people, so 100,000 different people is a realistic estimate.

Each of the four volumes after 1986 has its own index.

Celebrities are indexed under their birth names also. For example, Cary Grant is also indexed as “Leach, Alexander Archibald”. Clara Bow is also indexed by her popular nickname “The It Girl”. The names of living celebrities appear in the index when there are obituaries for their spouses and relatives; for example, Bob Hope died after the reprints were discontinued, but immediately beneath his indexed name are the obituary references of nine of his relatives, as well as his masseur and his business agent.

Non-human celebrities also appear in the index, such as Champion (Gene Autry’s horse) and Bonzo the chimpanzee.

== Critical evaluation ==
Excerpt from a review in Library Journal by John Smothers:

Almost since the periodical's inception, obituaries have been an important feature, and all of them (through 1986) have been gathered together here chronologically in 10 volumes, plus an index volume. The obits vary in length from one sentence to 30 paragraphs and more, with the average entry running about three paragraphs.
