= Variety Film Reviews =

Reprint of the Variety magazine containing film reviews

Variety Film Reviews is the 24-volume hardcover reprint of feature film reviews by the weekly entertainment tabloid-size magazine Variety from 1907 to 1996. Film reviews continued to be published in the weekly magazine after the reprints were discontinued.

== Original series ==
From 1983 to 1985, Garland Publishing, was responsible for the first sixteen volumes of this series. Garland is now wholly owned by Routledge, which has since been purchased by Taylor & Francis. Their first 15 volumes consisted of review reprints. Their 16th volume is an alphabetical index of more than 50,000 titles. Perhaps 10% are alternate titles and original foreign titles, so 45,000 review reprints is a realistic estimate for the first 15 volumes.

== Bi-annual supplements ==
The eight additional bi-annual volumes (for 1981–1996) have at least 15,000 additional reprinted film reviews, making an estimated total of 60,000 or more film reviews in the 24-volume series. Volume 18 has the title index for 1981–1984. Each subsequent volume includes its own title index.

== Edition binding ==
The 19 volumes published by Garland are bound in green (Variety's traditional color) cloth with gold stamping. Each book measures 31.2 cm. (12¼ inches) high by 24 cm. (9¼ inches) wide.

== Subsequent publisher ==
Garland's rights expired after publication of Volume 19, and publication rights were acquired by R.R. Bowker, then owned by Reed International, which also owned Variety. Bowker undertook a complete reprint of Volumes 1 through 19, changing the title page of each volume to reflect their own imprint, and changing the series name to Variety's Film Reviews. The re-titled series was bound in brown Kivar, or a similar imitation leather binding material. Bowker published the original editions of Volumes 20 through 24 before discontinuing the series.

== Alternate binding ==
Some copies of Volumes 20 through 24 are bound in green cloth with gold stamping similar to the original Garland editions. Apparently Bowker allowed a distributor that bought the Garland inventory of Variety Film Reviews to bind post-1986 volumes to match the earlier books.

== Volumes and years covered ==
Variety Film Reviews
Volume	Date Range	Garland ISBN	Bowker ISBN
1	1907–1920	978-0-8240-5200-3	978-0-8352-2779-7
2	1921–1925	978-0-8240-5201-0	978-0-8352-2780-3
3	1926–1929	978-0-8240-5202-7	978-0-8352-2781-0
4	1930–1933	978-0-8240-5203-4	978-0-8352-2782-7
5	1934–1937	978-0-8240-5204-1	978-0-8352-2783-4
6	1938–1942	978-0-8240-5205-8	978-0-8352-2784-1
7	1943–1948	978-0-8240-5206-5	978-0-8352-2785-8
8	1949–1953	978-0-8240-5207-2	978-0-8352-2786-5
9	1954–1958	978-0-8240-5208-9	978-0-8352-2787-2
10	1959–1963	978-0-8240-5209-6	978-0-8352-2789-6
11	1964–1967	978-0-8240-5210-2	978-0-8352-2790-2
12	1968–1970	978-0-8240-5211-9	978-0-8352-2792-6
13	1971–1974	978-0-8240-5212-6	978-0-8352-2793-3
14	1975–1977	978-0-8240-5213-3	978-0-8352-2794-0
15	1978–1980	978-0-8240-5214-0	978-0-8352-2795-7
16	Index 1907–1980	978-0-8240-5215-7	978-0-8352-2796-4
set	Volumes 1–16	978-0-8240-5216-4	—
17	1981–1982	978-0-8240-5217-1	978-0-8352-2797-1
18	1983–1984	978-0-8240-5218-8	978-0-8352-2798-8
19	1985–1986	978-0-8240-5219-5	978-0-8352-2799-5
20	1987–1988	—	978-0-8352-2667-7
21	1989–1990	—	978-0-8352-3089-6
22	1991–1992	—	978-0-8352-3273-9
23	1993–1994	—	978-0-8352-3577-8
24	1995–1996	—	978-0-8352-3851-9

== Other reprints of film reviews ==
Variety is one of the three English-language periodicals with 10,000 or more film reviews reprinted in book form. The other two are

- The New York Times as The New York Times Film Reviews (1913–2000) in 22 volumes.
- Harrison's Reports as Harrison's Reports and Film Reviews (1919–1962) in 15 volumes.
