= Harrison's Reports =

Defunct motion picture trade journal 1919–1962

- Editor: P. S. Harrison
- Frequency: weekly
- Founder: P. S. Harrison
- First issue: July 5, 1919; 107 years ago
- Final issue: September 1, 1962; 64 years ago
- Country: United States
- Based in: New York City

Harrison's Reports was a New York City–based motion picture trade journal published weekly from 1919 to 1962. The typical issue was four letter-size pages sent to subscribers under a second-class mail permit. Its founder, editor and publisher was P. S. Harrison (1880–1966), who previously had been a reviewer for Motion Picture News, in which his column was titled "Harrison's Exhibitor Reviews".

The first issue, dated 5 July 1919, stated that film advertising would not be accepted. A year's subscription cost $10. For more than a year, the type was set by a typewriter. The issue of 4 December 1920 and all subsequent issues were professionally typeset. The masthead of 1 January 1921 proclaimed itself

FREE FROM THE INFLUENCE OF ADVERTISING

In later years, that slogan was changed to

A REVIEWING SERVICE FREE FROM THE INFLUENCE OF FILM ADVERTISING

During its 44 calendar years of operation, more than 2,200 issues of Harrison's Reports were published. Approximately 17,000 feature films were reviewed; shorts were not reviewed, although their titles were listed in the indexes published several times a year.

== Subscription base ==
Before 1948 and the antitrust United States v. Paramount Pictures, Inc. decision, most movie theaters in the United States were owned and operated by film studios as part of a vertically integrated system, exclusively playing their own releases. Since the management of those theaters had little choice as to what movies they played, they had little or no use for Harrison’s Reports. Independently owned-theaters were consequently the principal subscription base of Harrison’s Reports and the publication's editorials addressed the interests of independent theaters. In 1937 there were approximately 3,000 subscribers at $15 per year.

== Opposition to product placement ==
From its review of The Garage (1920) to its last year of publication, Harrison’s Reports unyieldingly opposed product placement in movies. Other films criticized for brand name products appearing on screen include

- The Lost World (1925)
- Palmy Days (1931)
- Impact (1949)
- Love Happy (1949)

== Management and ownership changes ==
- The 10 March 1956 issue printed the first appearance of a name other than P.S. Harrison on the masthead, Al Picoult, managing editor, who bought control of the paper from Harrison.
- In June 1959, Picoult sold the paper to individuals associated with exhibitor, Allied States, which the paper had been close to and supported for many years. Harrison still retained an interest.
- The issue of 18 July 1959 showed Harrison's name on the masthead as “founder” (the previous week he had been “editor”), and David Martin was the new editor. The following week's issue (25 July 1959) mentioned Harrison's retirement.
- David Martin's name disappeared from the masthead with the issue of 6 February 1960. Wynn Loewenthal was the new editor.
- The masthead of 8 July 1961 showed a $2 increase in the price of a yearly subscription to $17, the first increase in 25 years.
- The first article of 5 August 1961 was titled “Editorial Transition”, stating there would be a new editor; nobody's name appeared on the masthead of that issue. On 12 August 1961, Martin Starr became editor.

== Final issues ==
The last issue was a two-page sheet dated 1 September 1962. It was headlined "MAYBE, IT'S NOT YET "30"." It lamented the financial woes of exhibitors in general. It also expressed hope that funding could be found to continue Harrison’s Reports.

The issue of 18 August 1962 was the last to carry reviews with the last reviews being Five Weeks in a Balloon, Waltz of the Toreadors and Der Rosenkavalier directed by Paul Czinner.

== Reprints ==
The entire run of Harrison's Reports has been reprinted in a 15-volume set of library-bound hardcover books, including an index of titles. The series is titled Harrison's Reports and Film Reviews (1919-1962). The Media History Digital Library has scans of the archive from 1927–1962 available online.

Two other significant English-language periodicals with 10,000 or more film reviews have appeared reprinted in book form:

- Variety, as Variety Film Reviews (1907–1996) in 24 volumes.
- The New York Times, as The New York Times Film Reviews (1913–2000) in 22 volumes.

For Variety and The New York Times, film reviews continued after the dates of the last reprints.
