= Wall Street Lays an Egg =

News article of the 1929 Wall Street Crash

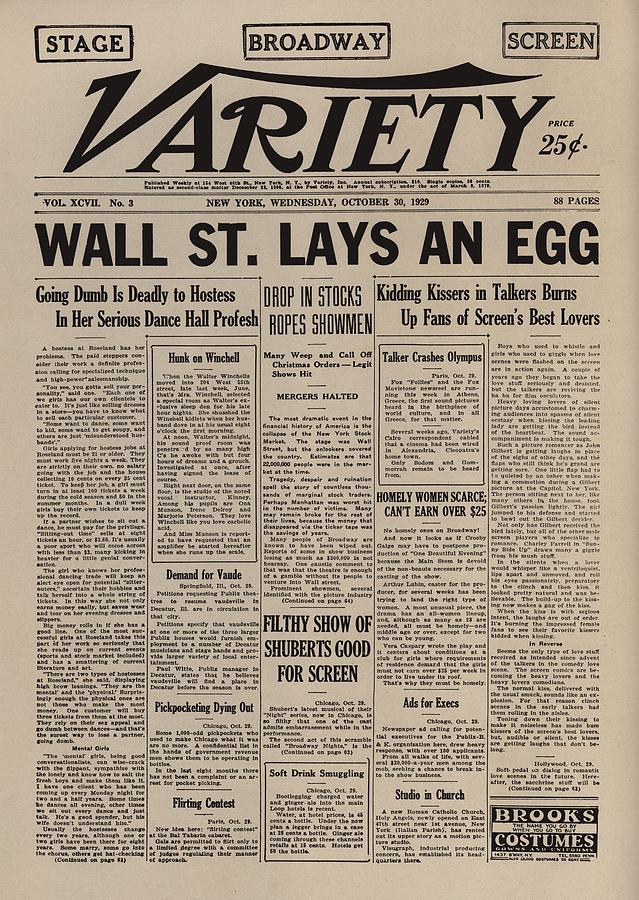
Front page of Variety, October 30, 1929

Wall Street Lays an Egg was a headline printed in Variety, a newspaper covering Hollywood and the entertainment industry, on October 30, 1929, over an article describing Black Tuesday, the height of the panic known as the Wall Street crash of 1929. (The actual headline text was WALL ST. LAYS AN EGG.) It is one of the most famous headlines ever to appear in an American publication and continues to be noted in history books into the 21st century.

"Laying an egg" is an American idiom, current particularly in 20th century show business, meaning "failing badly". Variety was noted for the slangy, breezy style of prose in its headlines and body text. Another famous headline in the paper was "Sticks Nix Hick Pix".

According to author Ken Bloom, Variety publisher Sime Silverman wrote the headline. However, Robert John Landry, who worked at Variety for 50 years, including as managing editor, says it was written by Variety city editor Claude Binyon. The report stated that several Broadway and film showmen had lost fortunes in the crash (although it named none) and predicted hard times ahead for theaters and escorts.

The phrase is sometimes still used to invoke the Great Crash. For example, the sub-chapter describing the Crash in the 1973 book A Random Walk Down Wall Street is titled "Wall Street Lays an Egg", as is chapter 18 of the 1996 book Lorenz Hart: A Poet on Broadway, and chapter 17 of the 2003 book New World Coming: The 1920s and the Making of Modern America.

Even into the 21st century, variations of the headline have been used to announce financial downturns, some by Variety itself ("Wall Street, Son of Egg" in 1962, "Wall Street Lays an Egg: The Sequel" in 1987), and some by other publications ("Wall Street Lays Another Egg" in Vanity Fair in 2008).
