= John M. Bremner =

- Born: January 18, 1922; Dumbarton, Scotland
- Died: July 25, 2007 (aged 85); Palm Desert, California, US
- Scientific career
- Fields: Soil science
- Institutions: Iowa State University

John McColl "Jack" Bremner (January 18, 1922 – July 25, 2007) was a soil scientist and agronomy professor at Iowa State University. An expert on the chemical composition of soil, he was a fellow of the American Association for the Advancement of Science and a member of the National Academy of Sciences.

== Biography ==
Bremner grew up in Dumbarton, Scotland and attended Dumbarton Academy. The son of a World War I veteran, Bremner had four older brothers and an older sister.

After earning an undergraduate degree at the University of Glasgow, he completed two doctorates from the University of London - one in chemistry and another in soil science. Bremner spent several years at the Rothamsted Experimental Station, and then he became a faculty member at Iowa State University from 1959 to 1992. He had been named the Charles F. Curtiss Distinguished Professor of Agriculture in 1975. He conducted research into the nitrogen and sulfur content of soil.

Bremner met his wife Mary at Rothamsted and they had two children. He was named a fellow of the American Association for the Advancement of Science in 1972 and was elected to the National Academy of Sciences in 1984. Bremner also received an honorary doctorate from Heriot-Watt University in 1970.

He retired from Iowa State in 1992. He died in 2007 at his home in Palm Desert, California. He was survived by his wife and two children.
