= Sherwin Cody =

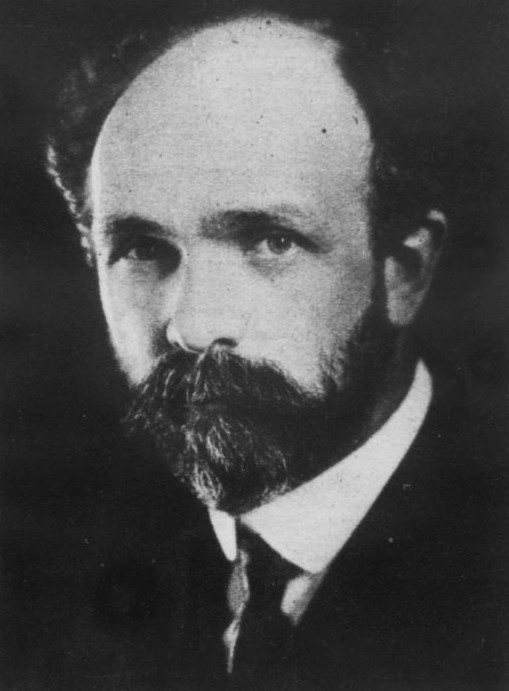
Portrait of Sherwin Cody, c1927

Alpheus Sherwin Cody (November 30, 1868 – April 4, 1959) was an American writer and entrepreneur who developed a long-running home-study course in speaking and writing and a signature series of advertisements asking “Do You Make These Mistakes in English?” A critic of traditional English education, Cody advocated colloquial style and grammar. His course, presented in a patented workbook format which he described as self-correcting, was purchased by over 150,000 students from its inception in 1918. He published essays, books and articles virtually nonstop from 1893 through 1950. In a book published in 1895, he gave the advice, "Write what you know—so go out and know something."

== Biography ==
Born in Michigan, Sherwin Cody was orphaned at an early age and raised by relatives in New England. He attended the Canterbury district school in New Hampshire, Waltham High School in Massachusetts, and in 1885 to Amherst College, where he studied with John Franklin Genung and worked as a secretary to Amherst President Julius Hawley Seelye.

After graduating from Amherst, Cody worked at various jobs trying to establish himself as a writer. After the failure of a Horatio Alger-style novel called In the Heart of the Hills, he moved to Chicago in 1896. Cody worked at the Chicago Tribune as correspondence education was being initiated at the University of Chicago, and he was assigned to writing a home study course on English for the Tribune. In 1903 Cody produced a version of his course in pocket-sized book form as The Art of Writing and Speaking the English Language which he advertised in the business magazine The System and elsewhere.

Historians of business communication list Cody among those establishing modern business communication based on the notions of clarity, correctness, courtesy, and colloquial style.

Marketing his own books and giving personalized correspondence courses in business writing connected Cody with Chicago business leaders and the school reform movement in Chicago and he developed a series of ability tests which became the basis of the Sherwin Cody 100% Self-correcting Course in English Language.

Working with the Ruthrauff and Ryan Advertising Agency and copywriter Maxwell Sackheim, Cody patented his course, franchised it to two Rochester New York businessmen, Walter Paterson and Charles Lennon, and worked with Sackheim to develop an ad campaign that ran for more than 40 years.

Cody's ad, headlined Do You Make These Mistakes in English? led with class-conscious examples of mistakes in English and concluded its leading paragraph by noting that “Every time they talk or write” many people "show themselves lacking in the essential points of English." Later Cody's account was managed by Sackheim protégé Victor Schwab, who treated it as an example of the scientific approach to advertising. Schwab referred to it as "An Advertisement That is Never Changed," and he gave a ten-year comparison of responses to two different headlines—Do You Make These Mistakes in English? and How to Speak and Write Masterly English, showing that the response rate was near three times better for the ad asking speakers about their mistakes.

Cody's ads ran in pulp magazines, slick magazines, comic books and newspapers, and while not literally an advertisement that never changed, it remained remarkably consistent and was even featured in an ad for the Schwab and Beatty in the 1950s. Do You Make These Mistakes in English? is routinely listed among the twentieth century's best advertisements.

Cody and his wife Marian lived near Chicago until the 1920s when they moved to the community of Dobbs Ferry, New York at 23 Summit Terrace. They had one son, Edward Morrill Cody (1901–1987), who served in the U.S. Foreign Service from 1941 through 1976, serving as the deputy director of the U.S. Information Agency under Edward R. Murrow and as a bureau manager for Radio Liberty from 1965 to 1976.

Cody was a first cousin to the famed Buffalo Bill Cody.

== Cody’s English Language Course ==
The Sherwin Cody 100% Self-correcting Course in English Language arrived in 25 weekly booklets, each divided into five sections. Composition was on Mondays, spelling on Tuesdays, punctuation on Wednesdays, grammar on Thursdays, and conversation and literature on Fridays. The daily lessons were tied to other reference books published by Cody including his Nutshell Library, a collection of pocket books excerpting the works of great writers, supplemented the literary studies.

The course was a homestudy course in which students identified and corrected individual weaknesses, with Cody selecting issues of spelling, pronunciation, grammar and word usage that were most commonly troublesome. As a business writer, he emphasized practical life goals such as sales, advertising and letter writing.

Cody marketed his course on the English language from 1918 until his illness and death in the late 1950s, when it was sold to the US School of Music and later discontinued. The course was revised in the 1930s with an increased emphasis on speaking (perhaps in reaction to Dale Carnegie’s How to Win Friends and Influence People).

== Selected works ==
- 1893 Life’s Philosophy. Privately printed book of poems.
- 1894 How to Write Fiction, Especially the Art of Short Story Writing. New York: The Riverside Literary Bureau, C. T. Dillingham & Co.
- 1896 In the Heart of the Hills. London: J. M. Dent.
- 1902 A Selection from the World's Greatest Short Stories Illustrative of the History of Short Story Writing. Cambridge: University Press, John Wilson and Son, copyright by A.C. McClurg & Co., Chicago.
- 1903 A Selection from the Best English Essays Illustrative of the History of English Prose Style. Cambridge: University Press, John Wilson and Son, copyright by A.C. McClurg & Co., Chicago.
- 1903 The Art of Writing & Speaking the English Language. Chicago: The Old Greek Press.
- 1904 Good English Form Book in Business Letter Writing. Chicago: School of English.
- 1907 How To Read and What To Read. Rochester, NY: The Sherwin Cody School of English.
- 1911 How to Do Business by Letter, and Advertising; A Practical and Scientific Method of Handling Customers by Written Salesmanship. London, Constable and Company, Ltd.
- 1912 “Scientific Principles in the Teaching of Composition,” English Journal 1, 161–172.
- 1913 How to be a Private Secretary; Or, Business Practice Up to Date, with Commercial Map of the United States. Chicago: School of English.
- 1914 “The Ideal Course in English for Vocational Students,” English Journal 3.5, 263–81, continued in 3.6, 371–80.
- 1914 English for Business Uses and Commercial Correspondence. Chicago: School of English.
- 1915 How to Deal with Human Nature in Business; A Practical Book On Doing Business by Correspondence, Advertising, and Salesmanship. New York & London: Funk & Wagnalls Company, also Chicago: School of English.
- 1916 “Tests to Use When You Hire,” System (August), 122–30.
- 1918 The Sherwin Cody 100% Self-Correcting Course in English Language. Rochester, NY: The Sherwin Cody School of English [revised 1936].
- 1918 How You Can Master Good English – in Just 15 Minutes a Day. Rochester, NY: The Sherwin Cody School of English.
- 1918 Course in the New Business Efficiency, Or, How to Make Money in Business. New York: B.C. Forbes Publishing Company.
- 1919 Commercial Tests and How to Use Them. Yonkers-on-Hudson, NY: World Book Company.
- 1924 The Art of Writing & Speaking The English Language. Story-Writing & Journalism
- 1944 Coaching Children in English. New York: Good English Publishers.
- 1950 Greatest Stories, and How They Were Written; selected by W. E. Henley with a series of introductions on the art of short story writing by Sherwin Cody. New York: Sherwin Cody Associates.
- 1950 Letters: Writing to Get People to Do Things. Rochester, NY: Sherwin Cody Course in English.
