= Sidne Silverman =

American publisher (1898–1950)

- Born: December 11, 1898
- Died: March 10, 1950 (aged 51); Harrison, New York, U.S.
- Other name: Skidgie
- Occupation: Publisher
- Spouse: Marie Saxon
- Children: 1
- Father: Sime Silverman
- Relatives: Syd Silverman (son)

Sidne Silverman (December 11, 1898 – March 10, 1950) was an American publisher. He was the president (publisher) and editor of Variety from 1933 to 1950.

== Life ==
Silverman was born to a Jewish family on December 11, 1898, the son of Harriett "Hattie" (née Freeman) and Sime Silverman. His father was the founder and publisher of Variety, an entertainment publication.

Silverman began writing reviews for Variety at seven years old under the pseudonym of Skidgie as the world's youngest theatrical critic. When his father died in 1933, he became its president (publisher) and editor. Silverman contracted tuberculosis in 1936 and could no longer take a day to day role at the paper.

Silverman married Marie Saxon, a Broadway musical comedy actress, on May 31, 1924. They resided in Harrison, New York, where he died on March 10, 1950, at age 51. Saxon had died in 1941. Their only son, Syd Silverman, became the third publisher of Variety.
