= Silverman's game =

In game theory, Silverman's game is a two-person zero-sum game played on the unit square. It is named for mathematician David Silverman.

It is played by two players on a given set S of positive real numbers. Before play starts, a threshold T and penalty ν are chosen with 1 < T < ∞ and 0 < ν < ∞. For example, consider S to be the set of integers from 1 to n, T = 3 and ν = 2.

Each player chooses an element of S, x and y. Suppose player A plays x and player B plays y. Without loss of generality, assume player A chooses the larger number, so x ≥ y. Then the payoff to A is 0 if x = y, 1 if 1 < x/y < T and −ν if x/y ≥ T. Thus each player seeks to choose the larger number, but there is a penalty of ν for choosing too large a number.

A large number of variants have been studied, where the set S may be finite, countable, or uncountable. Extensions allow the two players to choose from different sets, such as the odd and even integers.
