= Variety (magazine) =

American entertainment trade magazine

- Cover of the April 17, 2024, issue
- Editor-in-Chief: Ramin Setoodeh (co-president & co-editor); Cynthia Littleton (co-editor)
- Categories: Trade, entertainment
- Frequency: Weekly
- Publisher: Dea Lawrence (co-president & publisher)
- Paid circulation: 70,000
- Founder: Sime Silverman
- Founded: December 1905
- First issue: Weekly: December 16, 1905; 120 years ago in New York City; Dailies: 1933 in Los Angeles; 1998 in New York City
- Company: Penske Media Corporation
- Country: United States
- Based in: Los Angeles, California, US
- Language: English
- Website: variety.com
- ISSN: 0042-2738
- OCLC: 60626328

Variety is an American trade magazine owned by Penske Media Corporation. It was founded by Sime Silverman in New York City in 1905 as a weekly newspaper reporting on theater and vaudeville. In 1933, Daily Variety was launched, based in Los Angeles, to cover the motion-picture industry. Variety's website features entertainment news, reviews, box office results, plus a credits database, production charts and film calendar.

== History ==
=== Founding ===
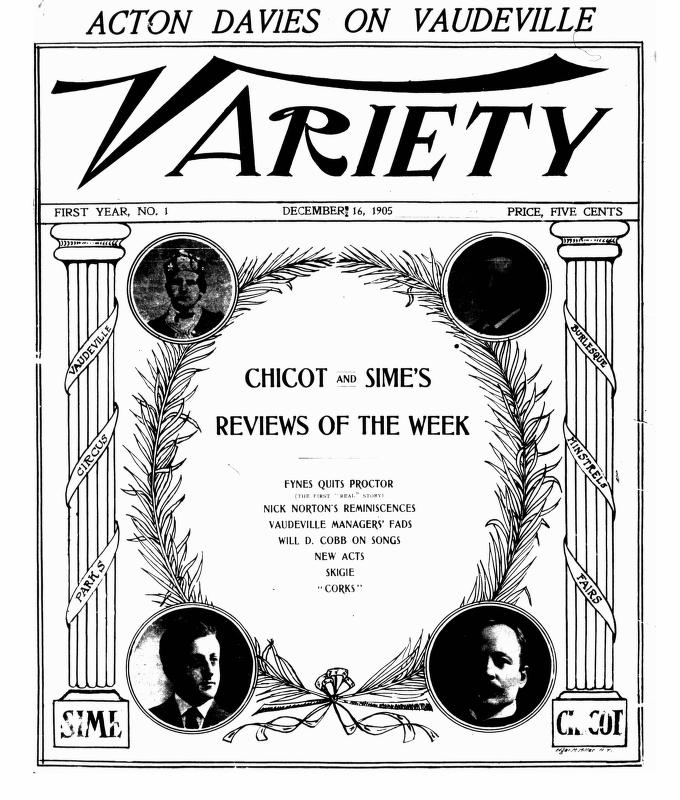
The first issue of Variety on December 16, 1905

Variety has been published since December 16, 1905, when it was launched by Sime Silverman as a weekly periodical covering theater and vaudeville, with its headquarters in New York City. Silverman had been fired by The Morning Telegraph in 1905 for panning an act which had taken out an advert for $50. He subsequently decided to start his own publication that, he said, would "not be influenced by advertising." With a loan of $1,500 from his father-in-law, he launched Variety as publisher and editor. In addition to The Morning Telegraph, other major competitors at the time of the company's launch were The New York Clipper and the New York Dramatic Mirror.

The original logo, which is very similar to the current design, was sketched by Edgar M. Miller, a scenic painter, who refused payment. The front cover contained pictures of the original editorial staff: Alfred Greason, Epes W. Sargeant (Chicot or Chic), Joshua Lowe, and Silverman. The first issue contained a review by Silverman's son Sidne, also known as Skigie (based on the childish lisping of his name) who was claimed to be the youngest critic in the world at seven years old.

=== 20th century ===
In 1922, Silverman acquired The New York Clipper which had been reporting on the stage and other entertainment since 1853, in an attempt to attract advertising revenue away from Billboard, following a dispute with William Donaldson, the owner of Billboard. Silverman folded it two years later after spending $100,000, merging some of its features into Variety. The same year, he launched the Times Square Daily, which he referred to as "the world's worst daily" and soon scrapped. During that period, Variety staffers worked on all three papers.

After the launch of The Hollywood Reporter in 1930, Silverman launched the Hollywood-based Daily Variety in 1933 with Arthur Ungar as the editor. It replaced the Variety Bulletin issued in Hollywood on Fridays as a four-page wraparound to the Weekly. Daily Variety was initially published every day other than Sunday but mostly on Monday to Friday. The Daily and the Weekly were initially run as virtually independent newspapers, with the Daily concentrating mostly on Hollywood news and the Weekly on U.S. and international coverage.

Silverman passed on the editorship of the Weekly Variety to Abel Green as his replacement in 1933. He remained as publisher until his death later that year, soon after launching Daily Variety. Silverman's son Sidne succeeded him as publisher of both publications but upon contracting tuberculosis in 1936 he could no longer take a day-to-day role at the paper. Green, the editor, and Harold Erichs, the treasurer and chief financial officer, ran the paper during his illness. Following Sidne's death in 1950, his only son Syd Silverman, was the sole heir to what was then Variety Inc. Young Syd's legal guardian Erichs, who had started at Variety as an office boy, assumed the presidency.

Ungar remained editor of Daily Variety until his death in 1950. He was followed by Joe Schoenfeld, an agent at the William Morris Agency who had previously worked at Variety from 1932 to 1943.

In 1953, Army Archerd took over the "Just for Variety" column on page two of Daily Variety and swiftly became popular in Hollywood. Archerd broke countless exclusive stories, reporting from film sets, announcing pending deals, and giving news of star-related hospitalizations, marriages, and births. The column appeared daily for 52 years until September 1, 2005.

Erichs continued to oversee Variety until 1956. After that date, Syd Silverman managed the company as publisher of both the Weekly Variety in New York and the Daily Variety in Hollywood.

Schoenfeld left Daily Variety in 1959 to return to the William Morris Agency as co-head of their worldwide motion picture department and Thomas M. Pryor, former Hollywood bureau chief of The New York Times, replaced him as editor. Under Pryor, Daily Variety expanded from 8 pages to 32 pages and also saw circulation increase from 8,000 to 22,000.

Green remained editor of Variety until he died in 1973, with Syd taking over.

In 1987, Variety was sold to Cahners Publishing for $64 million. In December 1987, Syd handed over editorship of Variety to Roger Watkins. After 29 years as editor of Daily Variety, Tom Pryor handed over to his son Pete in June 1988.

On December 7, 1988, Watkins proposed and oversaw the transition to four-color print. Upon its launch, the new-look Variety measured one inch shorter with a washed-out color on the front. The old front-page box advertisement was replaced by a strip advertisement, along with the first photos published in Variety since Sime gave up using them in the old format in 1920: they depicted Sime, Abel, and Syd.

For 20 years from 1989, Variety's editor-in-chief was Peter Bart, originally only of the weekly New York edition, with Michael Silverman (Syd's son) running the Daily in Hollywood. Bart had worked previously at Paramount Pictures and The New York Times.

Syd remained as publisher until 1990 when he was succeeded on Weekly Variety by Gerard A. Byrne and on Daily Variety by Sime Silverman's great-grandson, Michael Silverman. Syd became chairman of both publications.

=== 21st century ===
In April 2009, Bart moved to the position of "vice president and editorial director", characterized online as "Boffo No More: Bart Up and Out at Variety". From mid-2009 to 2013, Timothy M. Gray oversaw the publication as Editor-in-Chief, after over 30 years of various reporter and editor positions in the newsroom.

=== Acquisition by Penske Media Corporation ===
In October 2012, Reed Business Information, the periodical's owner, (formerly known as Reed-Elsevier, which had been parent to Cahner's Corp. in the United States) sold the publication to Penske Media Corporation (PMC). PMC is the owner of Deadline Hollywood, which since the 2007–2008 Writers Guild of America strike has been considered Variety's largest competitor in online showbiz news. In October 2012, Jay Penske, chairman and CEO of PMC, announced that the website's paywall would come down, the print publication would stay, and he would invest more into Variety's digital platform in a townhall.

In March 2013, owner Penske appointed three co-editors to oversee different parts of the publication's industry coverage; Claudia Eller as Editor, Film; Cynthia Littleton as Editor, TV; and Andrew Wallenstein as Editor, Digital. The decision was also made to stop printing Daily Variety with the last printed edition published on March 19, 2013, with the headline "Variety Ankles Daily Pub Hubbub". A significant portion of the publication's advertising revenue comes during the film-award season leading up to the Academy Awards. During this "Awards Season", large numbers of colorful, full-page "For Your Consideration" advertisements inflate the size of Variety to double or triple its usual page count.

In June 2014, Variety launched a high-end real-estate breaking news site, Dirt, under the direction of self-proclaimed "Real Estalker" Mark David, which later expanded to its own stand-alone site in 2019. October 2014 Eller and Wallenstein were upped to Co-Editors in Chief, with Littleton continuing to oversee the trade's television coverage. In June 2014, Penske Media Corporation entered into an agreement with Reuters to syndicate news from Variety and Variety Latino-Powered by Univision to distribute leading entertainment news to the international news agency's global readership. This dissemination comes in the form of columns, news stories, images, video, and data-focused products. In July 2015, Variety was awarded a Los Angeles Area Emmy Award by the Television Academy in the Best Entertainment Program category for Variety Studio: Actors on Actors, a series of one-hour specials that take viewers inside Hollywood films and television programs through conversations with acclaimed actors. A second Los Angeles Area Emmy Award was awarded in 2016.

In June 2019, Variety shut down its Gaming section.

In November of 2025 Dea Lawrence was named Co-President & Publisher of Variety, with Ramin Seetodeh named as Co-President and Co-Editor-in-Chief.

== Editions ==
- Variety (first edition published December 16, 1905) is a weekly entertainment publication with a broad coverage of movies, television, theater, music and technology, written for entertainment executives. It is the only remaining Variety print publication and is published weekly and delivered internationally.
- Daily Variety (first edition published September 6, 1933 and last published March 19, 2013) was the Los Angeles–based Hollywood and Broadway daily edition. The Daily Variety brand was revived in 2019 as a Mon–Fri email newsletter presenting the top stories of the last 24 hours. Top stories are also posted on the Daily Variety page of Variety.com. Daily Variety Gotham, (started in 1998) was the name of the New York City–based edition which gave a priority focus to East Coast show-business news and was produced earlier in the evening than the Los Angeles edition so it could be delivered to New York the following morning.
- Variety.com (launched in 1998) is the Internet version of Variety. It was one of the first online newspapers to charge for access when it launched. In June 2010, all content on the website became paywalled. The paywall was removed in April 2013, but access to additional content, such as the archives, requires subscription. Variety is also available as a mobile app as Variety On-The-Go.
- Variety Hitmakers (first edition published in November 2017) is the publication's first music franchise. The annual list recognizes the writers, producers, publishers, and other key personnel behind the scenes "who helped make―and break―the most consumed songs of the year as compiled by BuzzAngle Music". Kendrick Lamar, DJ Khaled, and Scooter Braun featured on three individual covers of the premiere print issues, with Lamar named Hitmaker of the Year. He, along with Khaled and Hailee Steinfeld, was honored at the inaugural Hitmakers awards ceremony held later that same month—the event has continued annually since. Other honorees have included Dua Lipa and Bebe Rexha as 2018's Breakthrough Artist and Songwriter of the Year respectively, BTS (2019 Group of the Year), and Harry Styles (2020 Hitmaker of the Year).

On December 15, 1906, Variety published its first anniversary number that contained 64 pages, double the size of a regular edition. It published regular bumper anniversary editions each year, most often at the beginning of January, normally with a review of the year and other charts and data, including, from 1938 onwards, lists of the top performing films of the year and, from 1949, the annually updated all-time rental chart. The editions also contained many advertisements from show business personalities and companies. The 100th anniversary edition was published in October 2005 listing Variety's icons of the century. Along with the large anniversary editions, Variety also published special editions containing lots of additional information, charts and data (and advertising) for three film festivals: Cannes Film Festival, MIFED (Mercato internazionale del film e del documentario) Film Market, and American Film Market Daily Variety also published an anniversary issue each October. This regularly contained a day-by-day review of the year in show business and in the 1970s started to contain republication of the film reviews published during the year.

Older back issues of Variety are available on microfilm. In 2010, Variety.com allowed access to digitized versions of all issues of Variety and Daily Variety with a subscription. Certain articles and reviews prior to 1998 have been republished on Variety.com. The Media History Digital Library has scans of the archive of Variety from 1905 to 1963 available online.

=== Circulation ===
The first issue of Variety sold 320 copies in 1905.

Paid circulation for the weekly Variety magazine in 2026 was 70,000. Each copy of each Variety issue is read by an average of three people, with an estimated total readership of 255,900. Variety.com has 32 million unique monthly visitors and a social following of 17.5MM.

== Culture ==
For much of its existence, Variety's writers and columnists have used a jargon called slanguage or Varietyese (a form of headlinese) that refers especially to the movie industry, and has largely been adopted and imitated by other writers in the industry. The language initially reflected that spoken by the actors during the early days of the newspaper.

Such terms as "boffo", "payola", and "striptease" are attributed to the magazine.

In 1934, founder Sime Silverman headed a list in Time magazine of the "ten modern Americans who have done most to keep American jargon alive".

According to The Boston Globe, the Oxford English Dictionary cites Variety as the earliest source for about two dozen terms, including "show biz" (1945). In 2005, Welcome Books published The Hollywood Dictionary by Timothy M. Gray and J. C. Suares, which defines nearly 200 of these terms.

One of its popular headlines was during the Wall Street Crash of 1929: "Wall St. Lays An Egg". The most famous was "Sticks Nix Hick Pix" (the movie-prop version renders it as "Stix nix hix pix!" in Yankee Doodle Dandy (1942), Michael Curtiz's musical–biographical film about George M. Cohan starring James Cagney).

In 2012, Rizzoli Books published Variety: An Illustrated History of the World from the Most Important Magazine in Hollywood by Gray. The book covers Variety's coverage of hundreds of world events, from the 1906 San Francisco earthquake, through Arab Spring in 2012, and argues that the entertainment industry needs to stay aware of changes in politics and tastes since those changes will affect their audiences. In a foreword to the book, Martin Scorsese calls Variety "the single most formidable trade publication ever" and says that the book's content "makes you feel not only like a witness to history, but part of it too."

In 2013, Variety staffers tallied more than 200 uses of weekly or Daily Variety in TV shows and films, ranging from I Love Lucy to Entourage.

In 2016, Variety endorsed Hillary Clinton for President of the United States, marking the first time the publication endorsed a candidate for elected office in its 111-year history.

== Office locations ==
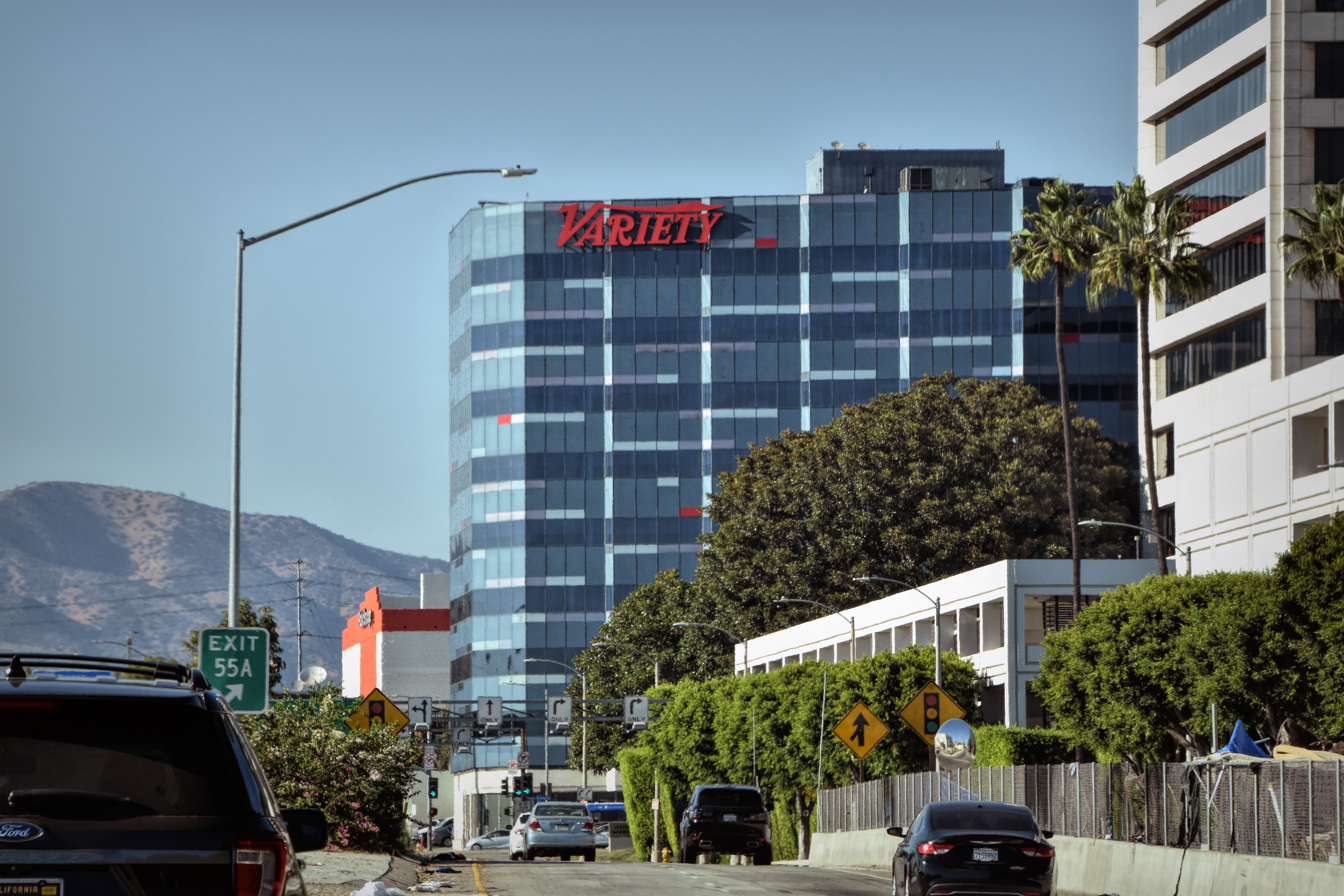
PMC's corporate headquarters in 2020

Variety's first offices were in the Knickerbocker Theatre located at 1396 Broadway on 38th and Broadway in New York. Later it moved to 1536 Broadway at the 45th and Broadway corner until Loew's acquired the site to build the Loew's State Theatre. In 1909, Variety set up its first overseas office in London.

In 1920, Sime Silverman purchased an old brownstone building around the corner at 154 West 46th Street in New York, which became the Variety headquarters until 1987, when the publication was purchased. Under the new management of Cahners Publishing, the New York headquarters of the Weekly Variety was relocated to the corner of 32nd Street and Park Avenue South. Five years later, it was downgraded to a section of one floor in a building housing other Cahner's publications on West 18th Street, until the majority of operations were moved to Los Angeles.

When Daily Variety started in 1933, its offices were in various buildings near Hollywood Blvd. and Sunset Blvd. In 1972, Syd Silverman purchased a building at 1400 North Cahuenga Blvd. which housed the Daily's offices until 1988, after which its new corporate owners and new publisher, Arthur Anderman, moved them to a building on the Miracle Mile on Wilshire Boulevard.

In late 2008, Variety moved its Los Angeles offices to 5900 Wilshire, a 31-story office building on Wilshire Boulevard in the Miracle Mile area. The building was dubbed the Variety Building because a red, illuminated "Variety" sign graced the top of it.

In 2013, PMC, the parent company of Variety, announced plans to move Variety's offices to their new corporate headquarters at 11175 Santa Monica Blvd. in Westwood. There, Variety shares the 9-story building with parent company PMC, Variety Intelligence Platform, and PMC's other media brands, including Deadline.com, Rolling Stone, Vibe, Billboard, Robb Report and the West Coast offices of WWD and Footwear News.

In 2023 Variety along with its parent company, PMC, announced plans to move its Los Angeles headquarters to LUMEN West LA located at 11355 W. Olympic Blvd.

== Content ==
=== Film reviews ===
On January 19, 1907, Variety published what is considered the first film review in history. Two reviews written by Sime Silverman were published: Pathe's comedy short An Exciting Honeymoon and Edison Studios' western short The Life of a Cowboy directed by Edwin S. Porter. Variety discontinued reviews of films between March 1911 until January 1913 as they were convinced by a film producer, believed to be George Kleine, that they were wasting space criticizing moving pictures and others had suggested that favorable reviews brought too strong a demand for certain pictures to the exclusion of others. Despite the gap, Variety is still the longest unbroken source of film criticism in existence.

In 1930 Variety also started publishing a summary of miniature reviews for the films reviewed that week and in 1951 the editors decided to position the capsules on top of the reviews, a tradition retained today.

=== Film reviewers' pen names pre-1991 ===
Writing reviews was a side job for Variety staff, most of whom were hired to be reporters and not film or theatre critics. Many of the publication's reviewers identified their work with four-letter pen names ("sigs") rather than with their full names. The practice stopped in August 1991. Those abbreviated names included the following:

- Abel – Abel Green, editor 1931–1973
- Adil – Sid Adilman
- Anby – Vincent Canby, 1951–1957, later chief film critic for The New York Times
- Army – Army Archerd
- Beau – Lee Beaupre
- Bell – Harry Ennis
- Besa – Peter Besas
- Bier – Tom Bierbaum
- Bige – Joe Bigelow
- Bill – Bill Greeley
- Bing – Claude Binyon
- Binn – Jim Robbins
- Bok – Bob Knight
- Bril – Brian Lowry
- Brog – William Brogdon
- Byro – Stuart Byron
- Cart – Todd McCarthy, 1979–1989; film review editor 1991–2010.
- Chic – Epes W Sargeant
- Con – John White Conway (1888–1928)
- Curt – Thomas Quinn Curtiss
- Daku – Dave Kaufman
- Daws – Amy Dawes
- Demp – John Dempsey
- Den – Dennis Wharton
- Dima – Phil DiMauro
- Devo – Susan Devins
- Doch – Blake Murdoch
- Dogo – Don Groves
- Drek – Derek Elley
- Duke – Forrest Duke
- Edba – Ed Barry
- Edna – Edna Fainaru
- Edwa – Bill Edwards
- Fob – Frank Beermann
- Fred – Fred Schader
- Gene – Gene Arneel
- Gerz – Gerald Putzer
- Gilb – George Gilbert
- Gohi – Gordon Hitchens
- Guid – Elizabeth Guider
- Har – James Harwood
- Hawk – Robert Hawkins
- Hell – Jack Hellmann
- Herb – Herb Michelson
- Herm – Herman Schoenfeld
- Hobe – Hobe Morrison
- Hoin – Nelson Hoineff
- Holl – Ronald Holloway
- Holl and Hyho – Hy Hollinger, 1953–1960, 1979–1992
- Humm – Richard Hummler
- Jac – Harlan Jacobson
- Jagr – James Greenberg
- Jaim – James Melanson
- Jane – Jane Barton
- Japa – James Park
- Jolo – Joshua Lowe
- Jopo – Joe Pollack
- Jose – Joe Cohen
- Kaja – Karen Jaehne
- Kell – J.R. Keith Keller
- Kelv – Jim McKelvey
- Ken – Ken Terry
- Kess – Norman Kessell
- Kav – Kevin Goldman
- Kirb – Fred Kirby
- Kirk – Cynthia Kirk
- Klad – Leonard Klady
- Klyn – Richard Klein
- Lait – Jack Lait
- Land – Robert J. Landry
- Len – Lenny Borger
- Lent – Paul Lenti
- Ley – Joe Leydon
- Lit – Lenny Litman
- Loft – Jack Loftus
- Lomb – Fred Lombardi
- Lor – Lawrence Cohn
- Lour – Lee Lourdeaux
- Loyn – Ray Loynd
- Mac - Joseph McBride
- Madd – John Madden
- Mark – Sanford Markey
- Mart – Markland Taylor
- Matt – Matthew Silverman
- Meyr – Frank Meyer
- Mezo – George Mezoefi
- Mich – Michael Siverman
- Mick – Larry Michie
- Mor – Morry Roth
- Mosk – Gene Moskowitz, longtime Paris correspondent and film critic
- Murf – Arthur D. Murphy, the principal film critic from December 1964 until October 1978.
- Myro – Harold Myers
- Ness – Lisa Nesselson
- Nic – Mike Nicolaidi
- Nubi – Domingo Di Nubila
- Paul – Paul Harris
- Pit – Jack Pitman
- Pope – John Pope
- Pry – Thomas M. Pryor, editor of Daily Variety from 1959 until his retirement in 1988.
- Quin – John Quinn
- Radd – Lee Radditz
- Reed – Don Reed
- Reli – Rebecca Lieb
- Rena – Rena Velissariou
- Rich – Richard Gold
- Rita – Rita Katz Farrell
- Rush – Alfred Greason
- Sam – B. Samantha Stenzel
- Sax – Marie Saxon Silverman
- Sege – Frank Segers
- Shie – Mel Shields
- Sid or Skig – Sidne Silverman, Variety publisher and Sime Silverman's son.
- Silv – Mark Silverman
- Sime – Sime Silverman, founder of Variety and the first to write a film review for the paper.
- Sisk – Robert Sisk, formerly a writer of "news letters" for The Sun in Baltimore, Maryland.
- Stils – Janet Stilson
- Strat – David Stratton
- Suze – Suzan Ayscough
- Syd – Syd Silverman, Sime Silverman's grandson
- Tege – Tom Gerard
- The Skirt – Hattie Silverman, Sime's wife
- Togi – Tom Gilbert
- Tone – Tony Scott
- Trot – Walt Trott
- Tube - Larry Tubelle
- Tush – Will Tusher
- Tyl – Ralph Tyler
- Ung – Arthur Ungar, first Daily Variety editor
- Verr - Addison Verrill
- Von – Bill Von Maurer
- Wall – G. Waller
- Watt – Roger Watkins
- Weil – Frances Weil
- Werb – Hank Werba
- Whit – Whitney Williams
- Will – Bill Willard
- Yung – Deborah Young
- Zink – Jack Zink

=== Reprints of reviews ===
Variety is one of the three English-language periodicals with 10,000 or more film reviews reprinted in book form. These are contained in the 24-volume Variety Film Reviews (1907–1996). Film reviews continue to be published in Variety. The other two periodicals are The New York Times (as The New York Times Film Reviews (1913–2000) in 22 volumes) and Harrison's Reports (as Harrison's Reports and Film Reviews (1919–1962) in 15 volumes).

In 1992, Variety published the Variety Movie Guide containing a collection of 5,000 abridged reviews edited by Derek Elley. The last edition was published in 2001 with 8,500 reviews. Many of the abridged reviews for films prior to 1998 are published on Variety.com unless they have later posted the original review.

=== Obituaries ===
The complete text of approximately 100,000 entertainment-related obituaries (1905–1986) was reprinted as Variety Obituaries, an 11-volume set, including alphabetical index. Four additional bi-annual reprints were published (for 1987–1994) before the reprint series was discontinued.

The annual anniversary edition published in January would often contain a necrology of the entertainment people who had died that year.

=== Charts and data ===
Variety started reporting box office grosses for films by theatre on March 3, 1922, to give exhibitors around the country information on a film's performance on Broadway, which was often where first run showings of a film were held. In addition to New York City, they also endeavored to include all of the key cities in the U.S. in the future and initially also reported results for ten other cities including Chicago and Los Angeles. They continued to report these grosses for films until 1989 when they put the data into a summarized weekly chart and only published the data by theatre for New York and Los Angeles as well as other international cities such as London and Paris.

As media expanded over the years, charts and data for other media such as TV ratings and music charts were published, especially in the anniversary editions that were regularly published each January.

During the 1930s, charts of the top performing films of the year were published and this tradition has been maintained annually since.

In 1946, a weekly National Box Office survey was published on page 3 indicating the performance of the week's hits and flops based on the box office results of 25 key U.S. cities. Later that year, a list of All-Time Top Grossers with a list of films that had achieved or gave promise of earning $4,000,000 or more in domestic (United States and Canada) rentals was published. An updated chart was published annually for over 50 years, normally in the anniversary edition each January.

In the late 1960s, Variety started to use an IBM 360 computer to collate the grosses from their weekly reports of 22 to 24 U.S. cities from January 1, 1968. The data came from up to 800 theatres which represented around 5% of the U.S. cinema population at the time but around one-third of the total U.S. box office grosses. In 1969, they started to publish the computerized box office compilation of the top 50 grossing films of the week based on this data. "The Love Bug" was the number one in the first chart published for the week ending April 16, 1969. The chart format was changed in 1989 to reduce the list to a top 40 and display a summary of the sample city theater grosses rather than publish the theater grosses separately. The sample chart was discontinued in 1990.

Arthur D. Murphy, who joined Variety in 1964 and worked there until 1993, was one of the first to organize and chart domestic box office gross information that became more available during the 1980s and report it in a meaningful form setting a standard for how film box office information is reported today. Murphy used the weekly sample reports to estimate the total US weekly box office compared with previous annual totals which was reported in Variety's US Box Office Report each week. The sample also allowed Murphy to estimate the Market Share percentage rankings of distributors.

In 1976, Variety Box Office Index (VBI) was launched where each month's actual key city box office tally, after seasonal adjustment, was simultaneously expressed as an index number, with 1970 as a whole being used as the base initially. The current month's VBI expressed the monthly box office performance as a percentage change from the base year. The index was published until 1991 giving a history of comparable monthly and annual box office performance for the past 20 years.

During the 1980s, Daily Variety started to publish a weekly chart of the domestic box office grosses of films as compared to the Top 50 chart in Variety which was based on a sample of key markets. Variety started to publish this weekend box office report together with the sample top 50 chart (later top 40) until they discontinued the sample chart in February 1990 with the weekend box office report being their main source of box office reporting.

In 2009, Variety launched a chart showcasing the top performing film trailers ahead of theatrical release in partnership with media measurement firm Visible Measures.

=== Other Variety products ===
In 1937, Variety compiled and published a Radio Directory compiling a record of events in radio such as program histories, ratings and popularity polls. It published an annual edition for the next three years which are available on the Media History Digital Library.

In 1981, Variety International Showbusiness Reference was published, which they claimed was the first book to contain a complete list of all winners and nominees for the Academy Awards, Emmy Awards, Tony Awards, Grammy Awards and Pulitzer Prize. The following year they published Variety major U.S. showbusiness awards containing just this award details and a revised edition, called Variety presents the complete book of major U.S. show business awards, was published in 1985.

In 1988, R.R. Bowker, a Reed Reference Publishing Company, part of Reed-Elsevier, PLC, a "sister" company to Variety, published Variety's Video Directory Plus, a CD-ROM subscription product, updated quarterly, containing metadata about 90,000 home video products and full-text film reviews from Variety.

International Film Guide
- ISSN: 0074-6053
- OCLC: 230752727

Peter Cowie joined Variety in 1989 and his International Film Guide, which had been published annually since 1964, became Variety International Film Guide with reports from countries on the year in cinema as well as information of film festivals. It continued to bear Variety's name until 2006.

In 1990, Variety published a 15-volume set of its television reviews (including home video product) from 1923 to 1988. Additional supplements were published covering 1989–1990, 1991–1992 and 1993–1994.

In 1999, Cowie published The Variety Insider with detailed information on the year in entertainment as well as historical information. A second edition followed in 2000.

In 2004, Variety published VLife, providing insider news on lifestyle features for the entertainment industry. It was published seven times annually.

=== Variety Studio: Actors on Actors ===
In November 2014, Variety premiered Variety Studio: Actors on Actors, a co-production with PBS SoCal that featured two actors discussing their craft and thoughts on Hollywood, which subsequently went on to win three Emmy awards, including a Daytime Creative Arts Award in May 2019.

In January 2017, they launched the Variety Content Studio, creating custom content for brands.

== Variety Insight ==
Variety established its data and research division, Variety Insight, in 2011 when it acquired entertainment data company, TVtracker.com. Its film database was announced in December 2011 as FlixTracker, but was later folded into Variety Insight. The subscription service is positioned as an alternative to crowd-sourced websites, such as the IMDb. The database uses Variety's existing relationships with the studios to get information. The New York Observer identified the main competitor as Baseline StudioSystems. In 2014, Variety Insight added Vscore, a measure of actors' cachet and bankability. In 2015, it partnered with ScriptNoted, a social media website for film scripts. In October 2020, it was rebranded Luminate Film & TV, part of Luminate, a joint venture between Penske Media Corporation (PMC) and Eldridge Industries.

== Variety Australia ==
Variety set up a bureau in Sydney, Australia from January 1, 1977 with Mike Harris as the bureau chief.

Variety Australia is a website owned by Brag Media, published under license from Variety Media, LLC. It covers film, TV and music around the world, but with a special focus on the Australian and New Zealand industries. The main writer is Vivienne Kelly.

== Variety India ==
Variety India was announced in September 2025. Initially scheduled to launch that November, the first edition of Variety India was published on February 1, 2026. It is owned by Thursday Tales Pvt. Ltd.

== See also ==
- Deadline Hollywood – Related publication owned by Penske Media Corporation
- List of film periodicals
- The Hollywood Reporter – American magazine and website
- TVLine – Related publication owned by Penske Media Corporation
- Variety Hitmakers Awards – Award given to popular songs
