= Syd Silverman =

American publisher (1932–2017)

- Born: January 27, 1932; Manhattan, New York, U.S.
- Died: August 27, 2017 (aged 85); Boca Raton, Florida, U.S.
- Education: Princeton University
- Occupation: Publisher
- Known for: Owner and publisher of Variety
- Spouse(s): Jan McNally Silverman (d. 1997); Dr Joan Hoffman
- Children: 4
- Parents: Sidne Silverman (father); Marie Saxon (mother)
- Relatives: Sime Silverman (grandfather)

Syd Silverman (January 23, 1932 – August 27, 2017) was an American publisher who was the owner of Variety magazine.

== Early life ==
Syd Silverman was born in Manhattan on January 23, 1932, to publisher Sidne Silverman and Broadway entertainer Marie (née Saxon) Silverman. He was the grandson of Sime Silverman, who founded Variety. His father was Jewish and his mother was from Massachusetts. Raised in Harrison, New York, Silverman was educated at the Manlius School and Princeton University, then served for two years in the U.S. Army.

== Career ==
When Silverman's father, Sidne, died in 1950, he became the sole heir to what was then Variety Inc. As he was only 18, a legal guardian oversaw the business until 1956, before he took charge.

After that date Syd managed the company as publisher of both the Weekly Variety in New York and the Daily Variety in Hollywood, until the sale of both papers in 1987 to Cahners Publishing for $64 million.

He remained as publisher until 1990 and became chairman of both publications.

== Personal life ==
Silverman's first wife, Jan McNally Silverman, a Roman Catholic, died in 1997. They had four children, Michael, Mark, Matthew and Marie Silverman Marich. He later married Dr. Joan Hoffman.

Silverman died on August 27, 2017, in Boca Raton, Florida, after a sudden illness. He was 85.
