= John B. Bremner =

American journalist

John B. Bremner (December 28, 1920 – July 30, 1987) was an Australian-American journalist and a distinguished professor at the University of Kansas. A former priest, Bremner worked as an editor for Catholic publications and taught at the University of San Diego and the University of Iowa before beginning a 16-year stint at the University of Kansas.

== Biography ==
Bremner was born in Brisbane. He studied at St. Columba's College in Springwood, Australia, at the University for the Propagation of the Faith in Rome, and All Hallows College in Dublin. Before he earned a graduate degree from the Columbia University Graduate School of Journalism, Bremner was an ordained Catholic priest.

Before entering academia, Bremner worked as an editor at the Florida Catholic and as a columnist at The Tidings, a newspaper published by the Roman Catholic Archdiocese of Los Angeles. Early in his academic career, he taught at the University of San Diego and the University of Iowa. In 1965, he completed a doctorate at Iowa. Beginning in 1969, Bremner was a journalism professor at the University of Kansas. Named the Oscar S. Stauffer Distinguished Professor of Journalism in 1977, he taught at Kansas until his December 1985 retirement.

Standing 6'5" and carrying a reputation for a no-nonsense approach, Bremner was described by one of his colleagues as "a delightful terror to students." He tried to push his journalism students to be skeptical and to value precise, clear language. "I work on the premise that the language in American newspapers is English – not jargon. I think that newspaper readers want and deserve both good grammar and good taste, along with good information," he said.

Bremner wrote two books, Words on Words: A Dictionary for Writers and Others Who Care About Words, and HTK, which was a headline writing textbook. He spent more than two years as a consultant for the Gannett Foundation, teaching newspaper seminars in 44 states. The Society of Professional Journalists honored him with the Distinguished Teaching in Journalism Award.

After leaving the priesthood, Bremner married the former Mary McCue. He died of cancer at his home in Ponce Inlet, Florida. The Bremner Editing Center at the University of Kansas journalism school is named in his honor.
