= Sime Silverman =

American journalist and newspaper publisher (1873–1933)

- Born: May 19, 1873; Cortland, New York, U.S.
- Died: September 22, 1933 (aged 60); Los Angeles, California, U.S.
- Occupations: Journalist, publisher, magazine founder and owner
- Known for: Founder, owner and publisher of entertainment trade journal Variety
- Spouse: Harriet Freeman
- Children: Sidne Silverman
- Relatives: Syd Silverman (grandson) Tyler Silverman

Simon J. Silverman (May 19, 1873 – September 22, 1933) was an American journalist and newspaper publisher. He was the founder of the weekly newspaper Variety in New York City in 1905, which gave theatre and vaudeville reviews and the Hollywood-based Daily Variety magazine in 1933, focusing on the emerging motion picture film industry.

== Early life ==
Silverman was born to an American Jewish family on May 19, 1873, in Cortland, New York. His father, Louis J. Silverman, was a businessman.

== Career ==
Silverman began his career by working for his father. In 1903, he became a journalist for the Daily America and wrote under the pen name "The Man in the Third Row". After the Daily America dissolved, he later joined the New York-based The Morning Telegraph but was fired in 1905 for a notice on a new sketch played by Mrs. Stuart Robson at Proctor's 58th Street theatre where the review mentioned the sketch was n.g. (no good). He was not aware that Mrs. Robson had given the Telegraph an advertising contract for $50. Despite suggesting that since the sketch was n.g., that might make the contract n.g., too, as Mrs. Robson wouldn't advertise what she couldn't play, the owner did not like the suggestion. Silverman decided that he would have to start his own paper in order to be able to tell the truth.

With a loan of $1,500 from his father-in-law, Alderman George Freeman of Syracuse, he launched trade newspaper Variety as the publisher and editor. He passed the editorship to Abel Green in 1931 but remained as publisher until his death, soon after launching the magazine Daily Variety.

During his career, Silverman was known as the "oracle of show business, the sworn foe of grammar, and the man who never let anyone pay a check." In 1934, he topped a list in Time magazine of the "ten modern Americans who have done most to keep American jargon alive".

In 1920, Silverman purchased an old brownstone building at 154 West 46th Street in New York, which became the company's headquarters until its sale and demolition in 1988. In 1922, Silverman acquired the entertainment newspaper the New York Clipper.

== Personal life, death and legacy ==
Silverman married Harriett Freeman in 1895. They lived at The Langham at 135 Central Park West in Manhattan.

Silverman suffered from a bronchial condition and, for health reasons, had travelled to California for the two winters before his death.

He died on September 22, 1933, at the Ambassador Hotel in Los Angeles, from a lung hemorrhage. He was 60 years old. His body was found by casting director Ben Piazza and the editor of Daily Variety, Arthur Ungar, who suffered a mild heart attack on finding the body. His funeral was held at Congregation Emanu-El of New York on September 28, 1933.

His son Sidne Silverman, known as Sid or "Skigie", succeeded him as publisher of both publications. His grandson Syd became the third publisher of Variety.

Silverman was the subject of a biography by Dayton Stoddart in 1941.
