= 2005–06 New Orleans/Oklahoma City Hornets season =

- Head coach: Byron Scott
- General manager: Jeff Bower
- Owner: George Shinn
- Arena: Ford Center (36 games); New Orleans Arena (3 games); Pete Maravich Assembly Center (1 game); Lloyd Noble Center (1 game)

Results
- Record: 38–44 (.463)
- Place: Division: 4th (Southwest); Conference: 10th (Western)
- Playoff finish: Did not qualify
- Stats at Basketball Reference

Local media
- Television: Cox Sports Television; The Cox Channel; Cox 4
- Radio: WTIX; KTOK

The 2005–06 New Orleans/Oklahoma City Hornets season was the team's fourth (Note: At the time, this season was considered the 18th season in franchise history, being viewed as a relocation from Charlotte. In 2014, after this team was rebranded as the Pelicans, the name and the statistical history of the original team was reclaimed by the present day Charlotte Hornets, who had begun play in 2004 as an expansion team known as the Charlotte Bobcats.) season in the NBA. They began the season hoping to improve upon their 18–64 record from the previous season (worst in the Western Conference that year). They finished the season with a 38–44 record, missing the playoffs for the second year in a row.

Before the commencement of training camp, the City of New Orleans was hit by Hurricane Katrina. With the New Orleans Arena partly damaged and the city's infrastructure in need of repair the Hornets signed a deal to play most of their games in Oklahoma City, becoming the New Orleans/Oklahoma City Hornets for this season. In Oklahoma City, the Hornets enjoyed sell-out crowds at the Ford Center. They also played one home game each at the Pete Maravich Assembly Center in Baton Rouge, Louisiana, and Lloyd Noble Center in Norman, Oklahoma.

The addition of draft pick Chris Paul resulted in the team competing for a playoff spot. In January and February, the club played winning basketball despite losing Chris Andersen to a two-year suspension for illegal drugs. Paul showed the poise and play making skills of a veteran finishing second in steals and seventh in assists as he posted a terrific 3.34 assist-to-turnover ratio, while leading all rookies with 16.1 points per game.

On March 8, the Hornets returned to New Orleans with a near sell-out crowd on hand to watch the team lose to the Los Angeles Lakers 113–107. In March, the Hornets went into a tailspin, winning just 3 of 14 games. The Hornets went on to finish in 4th place in their division. However, they missed the playoffs as they finished 10th in the West. Chris Paul was named Rookie of the Year.

== Draft picks ==
Round	Pick	Player	Position	Nationality	College
1	4	Chris Paul	PG	United States	Wake Forest
2	33	Brandon Bass	F	United States	LSU

The team entered the draft as the New Orleans Hornets, holding one original selection in each of the two rounds.

== Roster ==
2005–06 New Orleans Hornets roster
Players

Pos.	No.	Player	Height	Weight	DOB	From
C	12	Chris Andersen	6 ft 10 in (2.08 m)	245 lb (111 kg)	1978-07-07	Blinn
PF	33	Brandon Bass	6 ft 8 in (2.03 m)	240 lb (109 kg)	1985-04-30	LSU
C	42	P. J. Brown	6 ft 11 in (2.11 m)	225 lb (102 kg)	1969-10-14	Louisiana Tech
SF	45	Rasual Butler	6 ft 7 in (2.01 m)	205 lb (93 kg)	1979-05-23	La Salle
PG	5	Speedy Claxton	5 ft 11 in (1.80 m)	166 lb (75 kg)	1978-05-08	Hofstra
PF	21	Marcus Fizer	6 ft 9 in (2.06 m)	262 lb (119 kg)	1978-08-10	Iowa State
C	44	Marc Jackson	6 ft 10 in (2.08 m)	270 lb (122 kg)	1975-01-16	Temple
SF	43	Linton Johnson	6 ft 8 in (2.03 m)	205 lb (93 kg)	1980-06-13	Tulane
SG	6	Arvydas Macijauskas	6 ft 4 in (1.93 m)	214 lb (97 kg)	1980-01-19	Lithuania
SF	24	Desmond Mason	6 ft 7 in (2.01 m)	224 lb (102 kg)	1977-10-11	Oklahoma State
PG	25	Moochie Norris	6 ft 1 in (1.85 m)	175 lb (79 kg)	1973-07-27	West Florida
PG	3	Chris Paul	6 ft 0 in (1.83 m)	175 lb (79 kg)	1985-05-06	Wake Forest
SG	23	J. R. Smith	6 ft 6 in (1.98 m)	220 lb (100 kg)	1985-09-09	St. Benedict's Prep HS (NJ)
SG	1	Kirk Snyder	6 ft 6 in (1.98 m)	225 lb (102 kg)	1983-06-05	Nevada
PF	30	David West	6 ft 9 in (2.06 m)	240 lb (109 kg)	1980-08-29	Xavier
C	34	Aaron Williams	6 ft 9 in (2.06 m)	220 lb (100 kg)	1971-10-02	Xavier

Coaches
Head coach
- Byron Scott
Assistant(s)
- Jim Cleamons
- Kenny Gattison
- David Miller
- Darrell Walker
- Terry Kofler (trainer)
- Scott Cochran (assistant strength coach)

Legend
- (DP) Unsigned draft pick
- (FA) Free agent
- (S) Suspended
- Injured

Roster
Updated: March 31, 2006

== Regular season ==
=== Standings ===
Southwest Division	W	L	PCT	GB	Home	Road	Div
y-San Antonio Spurs	63	19	.768	-	34–7	29–12	13–3
x-Dallas Mavericks	60	22	.732	3	34–7	26–15	13–3
x-Memphis Grizzlies	49	33	.598	14	30–11	19–22	6–10
New Orleans/Oklahoma City Hornets	38	44	.463	25	24–17	14–27	7–9
Houston Rockets	34	48	.415	29	15–26	19–22	1–15

#	Western Conference				
#	Team	W	L	PCT	GB
1	c-San Antonio Spurs	63	19	.768	-
2	y-Phoenix Suns	54	28	.659	9
3	y-Denver Nuggets	44	38	.537	19
4	x-Dallas Mavericks	60	22	.732	3
5	x-Memphis Grizzlies	49	33	.598	14
6	x-Los Angeles Clippers	47	35	.573	16
7	x-Los Angeles Lakers	45	37	.549	18
8	x-Sacramento Kings	44	38	.537	19
9	Utah Jazz	41	41	.500	22
10	New Orleans/Oklahoma City Hornets	38	44	.463	25
11	Seattle SuperSonics	35	47	.427	28
12	Golden State Warriors	34	48	.415	29
13	Houston Rockets	34	48	.415	29
14	Minnesota Timberwolves	33	49	.402	30
15	Portland Trail Blazers	21	61	.256	42

=== Game log ===
2005–06 game log
Total: 38–44 (Home: 22–19; Road: 16–25)
November: 7–7 (home: 3–3; road: 4–4)

Game	Date	Team	Score	High points	High rebounds	High assists	Location Attendance	Record
1	November 1	Sacramento	W 93–67	P. J. Brown (20)	David West (11)	Speedy Claxton & Chris Paul (4)	Ford Center; 19,163	1–0
2	November 2	@ Cleveland	L 87–109	Speedy Claxton (16)	Chris Andersen (8)	Boštjan Nachbar (6)	Quicken Loans Arena; 20,562	1–1
3	November 5	@ Houston	W 91–84	P. J. Brown (18)	P. J. Brown (13)	Claxton & Paul (8)	Toyota Center; 15,875	2–1
4	November 9	Orlando	L 83–88	Speedy Claxton (24)	P. J. Brown (10)	Speedy Claxton (6)	Ford Center; 18,508	2–2
5	November 12	Dallas	L 103–109	Chris Paul (26)	P. J. Brown (7)	Speedy Claxton (7)	Ford Center; 19,163	2–3
6	November 15	@ Miami	L 102–109 (OT)	P. J. Brown (24)	P. J. Brown (12)	Chris Paul (10)	American Airlines Arena; 19,600	2–4
7	November 16	Denver	L 81–91	Chris Paul (18)	Brown, Paul, & West (9)	Kirk Snyder (5)	Ford Center; 18,442	2–5
8	November 18	Atlanta	W 95–92	Chris Paul (25)	Chris Andersen (18)	Chris Paul (12)	Ford Center; 17,554	3–5
9	November 19	@ Orlando	W 98–95	David West (34)	Andersen & West (8)	Chris Paul (8)	TD Waterhouse Centre; 14,489	4–5
10	November 21	@ Philadelphia	L 91–103	David West (20)	David West (9)	Chris Paul (6)	Wachovia Center; 12,452	4–6
11	November 23	Minnesota	W 84–80	David West (22)	David West (13)	Chris Paul (8)	Ford Center; 19,163	5–6
12	November 26	@ Seattle	W 105–99	David West (21)	Desmond Mason & Paul (7)	Chris Paul (10)	Key Arena; 16,371	6–6
13	November 28	@ Golden State	L 83–99	Chris Paul (15)	David West (11)	Speedy Claxton (9)	Oakland Arena; 16,270	6–7
14	November 30	@ Denver	W 102–95	Desmond Mason (26)	P. J. Brown (12)	Chris Paul (9)	Pepsi Center; 15,603	7–7

December : 5–10 (home: 4–3; road: 1–7)

Game	Date	Team	Score	High points	High rebounds	High assists	Location Attendance	Record
15	December 2	Philadelphia	W 88–86	David West (22)	P. J. Brown (14)	Chris Paul (9)	Ford Center; 19,163	8–7
16	December 3	@ Dallas	L 88–97	Chris Paul (25)	Brown & Paul (6)	Chris Paul (5)	American Airlines Center; 19,651	8–8
17	December 6	@ Memphis	L 73–89	Mason & West (15)	Chris Andersen (10)	Paul, J. R. Smith, & Claxton (4)	FedEx Forum; 13,271	8–9
18	December 7	Boston	L 87–101	David West (29)	Chris Paul (10)	Chris Paul (6)	Ford Center; 18,753	8–10
19	December 9	@ Portland	L 95–98 (OT)	Speedy Claxton (27)	Chris Paul (7)	Chris Paul (10)	Rose Garden; 12,305	8–11
20	December 11	@ Sacramento	W 100–110	Chris Paul (18)	P. J. Brown (8)	Chris Paul (12)	ARCO Arena; 17,317	8–12
21	December 12	@ Phoenix	W 91–87	J. R. Smith (26)	J. R. Smith (10)	Chris Paul (7)	America West Arena; 15,547	9–12
22	December 14	L.A. Clippers	W 102–89	J. R. Smith (21)	David West (12)	Chris Paul (8)	Ford Center; 17,490	10–12
23	December 16	Phoenix	L 88–101	Chris Paul (25)	Brown & West (13)	Chris Paul (6)	Pete Maravich Assembly Center; 7,302	10–13
24	December 18	San Antonio	W 89–76	David West (19)	Chris Paul (12)	Chris Paul (9)	Ford Center; 19,297	11–13
25	December 21	@ Minnesota	L 69–88	Chris Paul (15)	P. J. Brown (9)	Speedy Claxton (4)	Target Center; 14,454	11–14
26	December 23	@ Milwaukee	L 94–101	David West (27)	David West (18)	Chris Paul (8)	Bradley Center; 16,824	11–15
27	December 28	Houston	W 92–90	J. R. Smith (16)	Brown & West (7)	Chris Paul (15)	Ford Center; 19,205	12–15
28	December 29	@ San Antonio	L 84–111	David West (18)	P. J. Brown (6)	Chris Paul (7)	AT&T Center; 18,797	12–16
29	December 31	Dallas	L 90–95	David West (18)	David West (10)	Chris Paul (10)	Ford Center; 19,170	12–17

January : 10–5 (home: 6–2; road: 4–3)

Game	Date	Team	Score	High points	High rebounds	High assists	Location Attendance	Record
30	January 2	Charlotte	W 103–86	Chris Paul (24)	Mason & West (9)	Chris Paul (11)	Ford Center; 17,683	13–17
31	January 4	Miami	W 107–92	Desmond Mason (24)	Mason & West (7)	Chris Paul (9)	Ford Center; 19,326	14–17
32	January 6	Portland	W 90–80	Kirk Snyder (22)	David West (13)	Speedy Claxton (7)	Ford Center; 18,995	14–18
33	January 7	@ Atlanta	L 93–101	Speedy Claxton (29)	David West (9)	Kirk Snyder (4)	Philips Arena; 11,332	14–19
34	January 10	Detroit	L 86–96	David West (20)	P. J. Brown (9)	Chris Paul (5)	Ford Center; 19,260	15–19
35	January 13	Sacramento	W 90–76	David West (19)	Chris Paul (8)	Speedy Claxton (8)	Lloyd Noble Center; 11,343	16–19
36	January 14	@ Houston	W 86–80	Chris Paul (17)	P. J. Brown (10)	Chris Paul (5)	Toyota Center; 14,724	17–19
37	January 16	@ Charlotte	W 107–92	Chris Paul (24)	David West (11)	Chris Paul (6)	Charlotte Bobcats Arena; 15,303	18–19
38	January 18	Memphis	W 87–79	Chris Paul (16)	David West (14)	Chris Paul (9)	Ford Center; 14,554	19–19
39	January 20	@ Washington	L 99–110	Chris Paul (28)	David West (7)	Chris Paul (11)	Verizon Center; 19,062	19–20
40	January 21	@ New York	W 109–98	Chris Paul (27)	P. J. Brown (9)	Chris Paul (13)	Madison Square Garden; 19,763	20–20
41	January 23	@ Boston	L 78–91	David West (21)	P. J. Brown (8)	Chris Paul (6)	TD Banknorth Garden; 14,473	20–21
42	January 25	San Antonio	L 68–84	Rasual Butler & West (15)	P. J. Brown (9)	Chris Paul (4)	Ford Center; 19,289	20–22
43	January 28	@ Memphis	W 95–86	Speedy Claxton (20)	David West (12)	Chris Paul (8)	FedExForum; 16,228	21–22
44	January 30	Milwaukee	W 94–93	David West (24)	David West (15)	Chris Paul (9)	Ford Center; 18,197	22–22

February : 9–4 (home: 6–1; road: 3–3)

Game	Date	Team	Score	High points	High rebounds	High assists	Location Attendance	Record
45	February 1	Chicago	W 100–95	Chris Paul (25)	Brown & West (6)	Chris Paul (13)	Ford Center; 19,163	23–22
46	February 4	L.A. Lakers	W 106–90	Desmond Mason (21)	P. J. Brown (9)	Chris Paul (13)	Ford Center; 19,334	24–22
47	February 6	@ New Jersey	L 91–99	Speedy Claxton (23)	Mason & Paul (7)	Chris Paul (13)	Continental Airlines Arena; 13,998	24–23
48	February 8	Seattle	W 109–102	David West (26)	David West (10)	Kirk Snyder (12)	Ford Center; 18,807	25–23
49	February 10	New York	W 111–100	David West (21)	David West (10)	Speedy Claxton (11)	Ford Center; 19,163	26–23
50	February 11	@ Minnesota	W 100–94	Claxton & Snyder (28)	Desmond Mason (9)	Speedy Claxton (7)	Target Center; 15,933	27–23
51	February 13	Washington	W 97–96	David West (19)	David West (9)	Speedy Claxton (10)	Ford Center; 18,678	28–23
52	February 15	Portland	W 102–86	Kirk Snyder (22)	Rasual Butler (9)	Chris Paul (7)	Ford Center; 19,051	29–23
53	February 21	@ Indiana	L 75–97	Chris Paul (27)	Desmond Mason (7)	Chris Paul (6)	Conseco Fieldhouse; 14,108	29–24
54	February 22	Utah	W 100–95	Chris Paul (18)	Aaron Williams (13)	Chris Paul (7)	Ford Center; 18,368	29–25
55	February 25	@ Utah	W 100–95	Chris Paul (23)	Linton Johnson (11)	Chris Paul (8)	EnergySolutions Arena; 18,471	30–25
56	February 26	@ Portland	W 102–86	David West (22)	Marc Jackson (8)	Chris Paul (8)	Rose Garden; 12,860	31–25
57	February 28	@ Seattle	L 104–114	Chris Paul (25)	Chris Paul (7)	Chris Paul (14)	Key Arena; 15,115	31–26

March : 3–11 (home: 2–6; road: 1–5)

Game	Date	Team	Score	High points	High rebounds	High assists	Location Attendance	Record
58	March 1	@ L.A. Clippers	L 67–89	Desmond Mason (20)	P. J. Brown (11)	Chris Paul (12)	Staples Center; 16,157	31–27
59	March 6	Phoenix	L 88–101	David West (20)	David West (8)	Chris Paul (11)	Ford Center; 19,207	31–28
60	March 8	L.A. Lakers	L 107–113	David West (25)	Kirk Snyder (6)	Chris Paul (10)	New Orleans Arena; 17,744	31–29
61	March 10	Indiana	L 90–92	David West (20)	Chris Paul (7)	Chris Paul (8)	Ford Center; 18,506	31–30
62	March 12	New Jersey	L 84–95	Chris Paul (17)	P. J. Brown (8)	Chris Paul (7)	Ford Center; 19,198	31–31
63	March 14	@ San Antonio	L 81–96	Jackson & Paul (16)	Rasual Butler (8)	Chris Paul (7)	AT&T Center; 18,797	31–32
64	March 18	Denver	L 94–109	David West (24)	P. J. Brown (10)	Chris Paul (10)	New Orleans Arena; 17,912	31–33
65	March 21	L.A. Clippers	W 120–108	Rasual Butler (32)	David West (11)	Chris Paul (9)	New Orleans Arena; 16,799	32–33
66	March 23	Houston	L 92–93	David West (14)	David West (11)	Speedy Claxton (10)	Ford Center; 19,163	32–34
67	March 24	@ Chicago	L 82–96	Chris Paul (13)	Brown & Butler (9)	Speedy Claxton (6)	United Center; 21,793	32–35
68	March 26	@ L.A. Lakers	L 67–89	David West (23)	David West (10)	Claxton & Paul (6)	Staples Center; 18,997	32–36
69	March 27	@ Utah	L 80–104	Rasual Butler (15)	P. J. Brown (8)	Chris Paul (7)	EnergySolutions Arena; 17,437	32–37
70	March 29	@ Golden State	W 86–85	Rasual Butler (20)	Marc Jackson (8)	Chris Paul (7)	Oakland Arena; 16,885	33–37
71	March 31	Memphis	W 107–102	Marc Jackson (24)	Linton Johnson (8)	Speedy Claxton (8)	Ford Center; 18,817	34–37

April : 4–7 (home: 3–2; road: 1–5)

Game	Date	Team	Score	High points	High rebounds	High assists	Location Attendance	Record
72	April 2	@ Toronto	W 120–113 (2 OT)	Chris Paul (24)	Chris Paul (12)	Claxton & Paul (12)	Air Canada Centre; 15,079	35–37
73	April 4	@ Detroit	L 93–101	Paul & West (24)	Jackson, Johnson, & West (6)	Chris Paul (10)	The Palace of Auburn Hills; 22,076	35–38
74	April 5	Golden State	W 114–109 (OT)	Speedy Claxton (21)	Butler & Paul (11)	Chris Paul (16)	Ford Center; 18,169	36–38
75	April 7	Toronto	W 95–89	David West (19)	David West (9)	Chris Paul (8)	Ford Center; 18,854	37–38
76	April 8	@ Dallas	L 77–101	Rasual Butler (14)	Brown & Butler (7)	Chris Paul (5)	American Airlines Center; 20,336	37–39
77	April 10	Cleveland	L 101–103	Chris Paul (22)	P. J. Brown (10)	Chris Paul (5)	Ford Center; 19,187	37–40
78	April 12	Seattle	W 104–99	Chris Paul (21)	Marc Jackson (14)	Chris Paul (6)	Ford Center; 18,607	38–40
79	April 14	Utah	L 104–105	David West (31)	David West (12)	Chris Paul (7)	Ford Center; 19,163	38–41
80	April 16	@ Sacramento	L 79–96	Chris Paul (12)	Brandon Bass (7)	Chris Paul (7)	ARCO Arena; 17,317	38–42
81	April 17	@ Phoenix	L 78–115	Jackson & Paul (11)	Linton Johnson (7)	Chris Paul (5)	US Airways Arena; 18,442	38–43
82	April 19	@ L.A. Lakers	L 95–115	P. J. Brown (16)	Marc Jackson (13)	Chris Paul (7)	Staples Center; 18,997	38–44

2005–06 schedule

== Player statistics ==
Legend
GP	Games played	GS	Games started	MPG	Minutes per game
FG%	Field-goal percentage	3P%	3-point field-goal percentage	FT%	Free-throw percentage
RPG	Rebounds per game	APG	Assists per game	SPG	Steals per game
BPG	Blocks per game	PPG	Points per game

Player	GP	GS	MPG	FG%	3P%	FT%	RPG	APG	SPG	BPG	PPG
Chris Andersen	32	2	17.8	.571	.000	.476	4.8	0.2	0.3	1.3	5.0
Brandon Bass	29	1	9.2	.400	.000	.632	2.3	0.1	0.1	0.2	2.3
P.J. Brown	75	73	31.7	.461	.000	.827	7.3	1.2	0.6	0.7	9.0
Rasual Butler	79	20	23.7	.406	.380	.693	2.9	0.5	0.4	0.6	8.7
Speedy Claxton	71	3	28.4	.413	.270	.769	2.7	4.8	1.5	0.1	12.3
Marcus Fizer	3	0	13.0	.529	1.000	.500	2.3	0.3	0.0	0.0	6.7
Marc Jackson	27	10	22.0	.489	.500	.824	4.7	0.8	0.3	0.1	9.1
Linton Johnson	27	7	18.1	.403	.361	.739	4.3	0.4	0.4	0.4	5.3
Maciej Lampe	2	0	8.0	.000	.000	.000	2.0	1.0	0.0	0.0	0.0
Arvydas Macijauskas	19	0	7.1	.341	.250	.867	0.5	0.3	0.4	0.0	2.3
Desmond Mason	70	55	30.0	.399	.167	.682	4.3	0.9	0.6	0.2	10.8
Boštjan Nachbar	25	13	16.2	.339	.298	.694	2.0	0.9	0.5	0.2	5.0
Moochie Norris	16	0	11.4	.426	.444	.640	1.3	1.3	0.4	0.0	3.8
Chris Paul	78	78	36.0	.430	.282	.847	5.1	7.8	2.2	0.1	16.1
J.R. Smith	55	25	18.0	.393	.371	.822	2.0	1.1	0.7	0.1	7.7
Kirk Snyder	68	45	19.3	.453	.357	.735	2.4	1.5	0.4	0.3	8.0
Jackson Vroman	41	2	9.9	.394	.000	.477	2.1	0.3	0.3	0.3	1.8
David West	74	74	34.1	.512	.273	.843	7.4	1.2	0.8	0.9	17.1
Aaron Williams	34	2	20.4	.516	.000	.673	4.9	0.5	0.4	0.5	5.8

Bold leads team. Minimum of ten games started.

== Awards and records ==
=== Awards ===
- Chris Paul, NBA Rookie of the Year Award
- Chris Paul, NBA All-Rookie Team 1st Team

=== Free agents ===
==== Additions ====
Player	Signed	Former team

==== Subtractions ====
Player	Left	New team

== See also ==
- 2005–06 NBA season
