= 2005–06 Minnesota Timberwolves season =

NBA professional basketball team season

- Head coach: Dwane Casey
- General manager: Kevin McHale
- Owner: Glen Taylor
- Arena: Target Center

Results
- Record: 33–49 (.402)
- Place: Division: 4th (Northwest); Conference: 13th (Western)
- Playoff finish: Did not qualify
- Stats at Basketball Reference

Local media
- Television: KSTC; FSN North
- Radio: KFAN

The 2005-06 Minnesota Timberwolves season was the team's 17th in the NBA. They began the season hoping to improve upon their 44-38 output from the previous season. However, they came eleven wins shy of tying it, finishing 33-49 and missing the playoffs for the second straight season.

== Draft picks ==
Round	Pick	Player	Position	Nationality	College
1	14	Rashad McCants	SG	United States	North Carolina
2	47	Bracey Wright	G	United States	Indiana

== Roster ==
2005–06 Minnesota Timberwolves roster
Players

Pos.	No.	Player	Height	Weight	DOB	From
PG	3	Marcus Banks	6 ft 2 in (1.88 m)	205 lb (93 kg)	1981-11-19	UNLV
C	30	Mark Blount	7 ft 0 in (2.13 m)	250 lb (113 kg)	1975-11-30	Pittsburgh
PG	7	Anthony Carter	6 ft 1 in (1.85 m)	190 lb (86 kg)	1975-06-16	Hawaiʻi
SF	31	Ricky Davis	6 ft 7 in (2.01 m)	195 lb (88 kg)	1979-09-23	Iowa
SF	12	Ronald Dupree	6 ft 7 in (2.01 m)	210 lb (95 kg)	1981-01-26	LSU
PF	21	Kevin Garnett	6 ft 11 in (2.11 m)	220 lb (100 kg)	1976-05-19	Farragut Academy (IL)
C	41	Eddie Griffin	6 ft 10 in (2.08 m)	240 lb (109 kg)	1982-05-30	Seton Hall
SG	23	Trenton Hassell	6 ft 5 in (1.96 m)	233 lb (106 kg)	1979-03-04	Austin Peay
PG	16	Troy Hudson	6 ft 1 in (1.85 m)	170 lb (77 kg)	1976-03-13	Southern Illinois
PG	55	Marko Jarić	6 ft 7 in (2.01 m)	198 lb (90 kg)	1978-10-12	Serbia
C	35	Mark Madsen	6 ft 9 in (2.06 m)	245 lb (111 kg)	1976-01-28	Stanford
SG	1	Rashad McCants	6 ft 4 in (1.93 m)	207 lb (94 kg)	1984-09-25	North Carolina
SF	9	Justin Reed	6 ft 8 in (2.03 m)	240 lb (109 kg)	1982-01-16	Mississippi
SG	6	Bracey Wright (DL)	6 ft 3 in (1.91 m)	210 lb (95 kg)	1984-07-01	Indiana

Coaches
Head coach
- Dwane Casey
Assistant(s)
- Johnny Davis
- Aleksandar Džikić
- Rex Kalamian
- Vince Taylor
- Gregg Farnam (trainer)

Legend
- (DP) Unsigned draft pick
- (FA) Free agent
- (S) Suspended
- (DL) On assignment to D-League affiliate
- Injured

Roster
Updated: April 10, 2006

== Regular season ==
=== Season standings ===
Northwest Division	W	L	PCT	GB	Home	Road	Div
y-Denver Nuggets	44	38	.537	-	26–15	18–23	10–6
Utah Jazz	41	41	.500	3	22–19	19–22	11–5
Seattle SuperSonics	35	47	.427	9	22–19	13–28	10–6
Minnesota Timberwolves	33	49	.402	11	24–17	9–32	6–10
Portland Trail Blazers	21	61	.256	23	15–26	6–35	3–13

#	Western Conference				
#	Team	W	L	PCT	GB
1	c-San Antonio Spurs	63	19	.768	-
2	y-Phoenix Suns	54	28	.659	9
3	y-Denver Nuggets	44	38	.537	19
4	x-Dallas Mavericks	60	22	.732	3
5	x-Memphis Grizzlies	49	33	.598	14
6	x-Los Angeles Clippers	47	35	.573	16
7	x-Los Angeles Lakers	45	37	.549	18
8	x-Sacramento Kings	44	38	.537	19
9	Utah Jazz	41	41	.500	22
10	New Orleans/Oklahoma City Hornets	38	44	.463	25
11	Seattle SuperSonics	35	47	.427	28
12	Golden State Warriors	34	48	.415	29
13	Houston Rockets	34	48	.415	29
14	Minnesota Timberwolves	33	49	.402	30
15	Portland Trail Blazers	21	61	.256	42

== Player statistics ==
=== Ragular season ===
Player	POS	GP	GS	MP	REB	AST	STL	BLK	PTS	MPG	RPG	APG	SPG	BPG	PPG
Rashad McCants	SG	79	12	1,362	143	63	44	22	627	17.2	1.8	.8	.6	.3	7.9
Trenton Hassell	SG	77	67	2,514	216	203	43	29	710	32.6	2.8	2.6	.6	.4	9.2
Kevin Garnett	PF	76	76	2,957	966	308	104	107	1,656	38.9	12.7	4.1	1.4	1.4	21.8
Marko Jarić	PG	75	49	2,102	233	293	108	21	587	28.0	3.1	3.9	1.4	.3	7.8
Eddie Griffin	C	70	27	1,359	389	40	13	148	320	19.4	5.6	.6	.2	2.1	4.6
Mark Madsen	C	62	7	676	141	11	23	17	74	10.9	2.3	.2	.4	.3	1.2
Anthony Carter	PG	45	8	589	62	101	24	9	150	13.1	1.4	2.2	.5	.2	3.3
Mark Blount^{†}	C	42	30	1,157	203	33	25	40	429	27.5	4.8	.8	.6	1.0	10.2
Wally Szczerbiak^{†}	SF	40	40	1,555	190	112	21	15	805	38.9	4.8	2.8	.5	.4	20.1
Marcus Banks^{†}	PG	40	28	1,228	116	188	47	11	479	30.7	2.9	4.7	1.2	.3	12.0
Justin Reed^{†}	SF	40	6	706	95	34	18	11	250	17.7	2.4	.9	.5	.3	6.3
Ricky Davis^{†}	SF	36	36	1,460	164	173	42	8	689	40.6	4.6	4.8	1.2	.2	19.1
Troy Hudson	PG	36	0	800	44	106	12	4	342	22.2	1.2	2.9	.3	.1	9.5
Ronald Dupree	SF	36	0	265	49	14	12	0	80	7.4	1.4	.4	.3	.0	2.2
Michael Olowokandi^{†}	C	32	24	752	179	17	19	27	193	23.5	5.6	.5	.6	.8	6.0
Richie Frahm^{†}	SG	25	0	225	23	15	3	2	66	9.0	.9	.6	.1	.1	2.6
Bracey Wright	SG	7	0	135	18	5	1	0	62	19.3	2.6	.7	.1	.0	8.9
Nikoloz Tskitishvili^{†}	PF	5	0	13	2	0	0	0	3	2.6	.4	.0	.0	.0	.6

- ^{†} Denotes player spent time with another team in the season. Stats reflect time with the Timberwolves only.

== Awards and records ==
- Kevin Garnett, All-NBA Third Team
- Kevin Garnett, NBA All-Defensive Second Team
- Kevin Garnett, J. Walter Kennedy Citizenship Award
