= 2005–06 Dallas Mavericks season =

NBA professional basketball team season

- Conference champions
- Head coach: Avery Johnson
- President: Donnie Nelson
- General manager: Donnie Nelson
- Owner: Mark Cuban
- Arena: American Airlines Center

Results
- Record: 60–22 (.732)
- Place: Division: 2nd (Southwest); Conference: 4th (Western)
- Playoff finish: NBA Finals (lost to Heat 2–4)
- Stats at Basketball Reference

Local media
- Television: KTVT; KTXA; FSN Southwest
- Radio: KESN

The 2005–06 Dallas Mavericks season was the 26th season of the franchise in the National Basketball Association (NBA). The season saw Dallas go to the NBA Finals for the first time in franchise history, but lost to the Miami Heat, who were led by Shaquille O'Neal and Dwyane Wade, in six games. Dallas and Miami met again in the 2011 NBA Finals, where the Mavericks avenged the loss and defeated the favored Heat in six games to win their first NBA championship. Teammates Dirk Nowitzki and Jason Terry were the only members of both 2006 and 2011 Finals teams.

In the playoffs, the Mavericks defeated the Memphis Grizzlies in the first round. In the Western Conference semifinals, they met the San Antonio Spurs once again in the playoffs for the first time since the 2003 Western Conference finals, and defeated the Spurs in seven games. They got to Conference finals once again for the first time since 2003, where they beat the Phoenix Suns in six games and won their first conference title in franchise history. In the NBA Finals, they faced the Miami Heat but lost to them in six games.

Starting the season, the Mavericks started with a 35–10 record as Dirk Nowitzki was selected for the 2006 NBA All-Star Game in Houston. The Mavericks finished with a 60–22 record overall and second place in the Southwest Division. Head coach Avery Johnson was named Coach of The Year. Following the season, Keith Van Horn retired.

== Draft picks ==
The Mavericks did not have any selections in the 2005 NBA Draft.

== Roster ==
2005–06 Dallas Mavericks roster
Players

Pos.	No.	Player	Height	Weight	DOB	From
PG	10	Darrell Armstrong	6 ft 0 in (1.83 m)	170 lb (77 kg)	1968-06-22	Fayetteville State
C	25	Erick Dampier	6 ft 11 in (2.11 m)	265 lb (120 kg)	1975-07-14	Mississippi State
SG	6	Marquis Daniels	6 ft 6 in (1.98 m)	200 lb (91 kg)	1981-01-07	Auburn
C	7	DeSagana Diop	7 ft 0 in (2.13 m)	280 lb (127 kg)	1982-01-30	Oak Hill Academy (HS)
SG	44	Adrian Griffin	6 ft 5 in (1.96 m)	217 lb (98 kg)	1974-07-04	Seton Hall
PG	34	Devin Harris	6 ft 3 in (1.91 m)	192 lb (87 kg)	1983-02-27	Wisconsin
SF	5	Josh Howard	6 ft 7 in (2.01 m)	210 lb (95 kg)	1980-04-28	Wake Forest
C	28	D. J. Mbenga	7 ft 0 in (2.13 m)	255 lb (116 kg)	1980-12-30	DR Congo
SF	1	Rawle Marshall	6 ft 7 in (2.01 m)	190 lb (86 kg)	1982-02-20	Oakland
PF	41	Dirk Nowitzki	7 ft 0 in (2.13 m)	245 lb (111 kg)	1978-06-19	Germany
C	24	Pavel Podkolzin	7 ft 5 in (2.26 m)	305 lb (138 kg)	1985-01-15	Russia
PF	33	Josh Powell	6 ft 10 in (2.08 m)	225 lb (102 kg)	1983-01-25	NC State
SG	42	Jerry Stackhouse	6 ft 6 in (1.98 m)	218 lb (99 kg)	1975-11-05	North Carolina
PG	31	Jason Terry	6 ft 2 in (1.88 m)	185 lb (84 kg)	1977-09-15	Arizona
SF	2	Keith Van Horn	6 ft 10 in (2.08 m)	240 lb (109 kg)	1975-10-23	Utah

Coaches
Head coach
- Avery Johnson
Assistant(s)
- Rolando Blackman
- Brad Davis (player development)
- Del Harris
- Joe Prunty
- Larry Riley

Legend
- (DP) Unsigned draft pick
- (FA) Free agent
- (S) Suspended
- Injured

Roster
Updated: April 23, 2006

== Regular season ==
=== Standings ===
==== Division ====
Southwest Division	W	L	PCT	GB	Home	Road	Div
y-San Antonio Spurs	63	19	.768	-	34–7	29–12	13–3
x-Dallas Mavericks	60	22	.732	3	34–7	26–15	13–3
x-Memphis Grizzlies	49	33	.598	14	30–11	19–22	6–10
New Orleans/Oklahoma City Hornets	38	44	.463	25	24–17	14–27	7–9
Houston Rockets	34	48	.415	29	15–26	19–22	1–15

==== Conference ====
#	Western Conference				
#	Team	W	L	PCT	GB
1	c-San Antonio Spurs	63	19	.768	-
2	y-Phoenix Suns	54	28	.659	9
3	y-Denver Nuggets	44	38	.537	19
4	x-Dallas Mavericks	60	22	.732	3
5	x-Memphis Grizzlies	49	33	.598	14
6	x-Los Angeles Clippers	47	35	.573	16
7	x-Los Angeles Lakers	45	37	.549	18
8	x-Sacramento Kings	44	38	.537	19
9	Utah Jazz	41	41	.500	22
10	New Orleans/Oklahoma City Hornets	38	44	.463	25
11	Seattle SuperSonics	35	47	.427	28
12	Golden State Warriors	34	48	.415	29
13	Houston Rockets	34	48	.415	29
14	Minnesota Timberwolves	33	49	.402	30
15	Portland Trail Blazers	21	61	.256	42

=== Game log ===
2005–06 game log
Total: 60–22 (home: 34–7; road: 26–15)
November: 10–4 (home: 5–1; road: 5–3)

Game	Date	Team	Score	High points	High rebounds	High assists	Location Attendance	Record
1	November 1	@ Phoenix	W 111–108 (2OT)	Dirk Nowitzki (28)	Dirk Nowitzki (15)	Darrell Armstrong (5)	America West Arena; 17,961	1–0
2	November 2	@ Utah	L 82–93	Jason Terry (21)	Keith Van Horn (11)	Keith Van Horn (3)	Delta Center; 18,249	1–1
3	November 5	San Antonio	W 103–84	Dirk Nowitzki (34)	Josh Howard (12)	Jason Terry (8)	American Airlines Center; 20,468	2–1
4	November 9	@ Philadelphia	L 97–112	Keith Van Horn (19)	Keith Van Horn (13)	Josh Howard (6)	Wachovia Center; 13,392	2–2
5	November 11	@ Charlotte	W 98–88	Dirk Nowitzki (23)	Dirk Nowitzki (16)	Dirk Nowitzki (4)	Charlotte Bobcats Arena; 18,130	3–2
6	November 12	@ New Orleans/Oklahoma City	W 109–103	Dirk Nowitzki (30)	DeSagana Diop (5)	Devin Harris (5)	Ford Center; 19,163	4–2
7	November 15	Denver	W 83–80	Dirk Nowitzki (35)	DeSagana Diop (16)	Devin Harris (8)	American Airlines Center; 20,189	5–2
8	November 17	Atlanta	W 87–78	Josh Howard (25)	Dirk Nowitzki (13)	Daniels, Harris (4)	American Airlines Center; 20,148	6–2
9	November 19	Detroit	W 119–82	Josh Howard (26)	Erick Dampier (14)	Marquis Daniels (6)	American Airlines Center; 20,337	7–2
10	November 22	Houston	W 102–93	Dirk Nowitzki (31)	Josh Howard (11)	Jason Terry (5)	American Airlines Center; 20,304	8–2
11	November 25	@ Miami	W 103–90	Josh Howard (25)	Josh Howard (11)	Jason Terry (10)	American Airlines Arena; 20,246	9–2
12	November 26	Memphis	L 92–112	Dirk Nowitzki (27)	Howard, Nowitzki (9)	Marquis Daniels (3)	American Airlines Center; 20,135	9–3
13	November 28	@ Toronto	W 93–91	Dirk Nowitzki (29)	Nowitzki, Dampier (11)	Jason Terry (6)	Air Canada Centre; 15,789	10–3
14	November 29	@ Milwaukee	L 111–113 (OT)	Jason Terry (37)	Dirk Nowitzki (12)	Marquis Daniels (4)	Bradley Center; 14,996	10–4

December: 12–4 (home: 6–3; road: 6–1)

Game	Date	Team	Score	High points	High rebounds	High assists	Location Attendance	Record
15	December 1	San Antonio	L 90–92	Marquis Daniels (28)	Nowitzki, Diop (9)	Dirk Nowitzki (6)	American Airlines Center; 20,076	10–5
16	December 3	New Orleans/Oklahoma City	W 97–88	Dirk Nowitzki (30)	Nowitzki, Diop (8)	Daniels, Harris (5)	American Airlines Center; 19,651	11–5
17	December 5	@ Chicago	W 102–94	Dirk Nowitzki (35)	Adrian Griffin (12)	Devin Harris (10)	United Center; 21,733	12–5
18	December 6	@ Indiana	W 84–75	Dirk Nowitzki (31)	Dirk Nowitzki (11)	Devin Harris (5)	Conseco Fieldhouse; 14,627	13–5
19	December 9	@ Memphis	W 90–83	Dirk Nowitzki (35)	Erick Dampier (11)	Devin Harris (8)	FedExForum; 17,176	14–5
20	December 10	Boston	W 103–94	Dirk Nowitzki (24)	Adrian Griffin (10)	four players tied (4)	American Airlines Center; 20,156	15–5
21	December 12	L.A. Lakers	L 106–109	Dirk Nowitzki (27)	Dirk Nowitzki (15)	Jason Terry (5)	American Airlines Center; 19,680	15–6
22	December 14	Phoenix	W 102–96	Dirk Nowitzki (29)	Josh Howard (18)	Terry, Harris (4)	American Airlines Center; 19,731	16–6
23	December 16	Orlando	W 109–103 (OT)	Dirk Nowitzki (31)	Adrian Griffin (9)	Dirk Nowitzki (5)	American Airlines Center; 19,876	17–6
24	December 18	Minnesota	W 102–95	Josh Howard (23)	Erick Dampier (8)	Devin Harris (6)	American Airlines Center; 20,134	18–6
25	December 20	@ L.A. Lakers	L 90–112	Nowitzki, Harris (18)	Dirk Nowitzki (11)	Nowitzki, Griffin (3)	Staples Center; 18,997	18–7
26	December 22	@ Sacramento	W 105–95	Dirk Nowitzki (37)	Josh Howard (13)	Josh Howard (6)	ARCO Arena; 17,317	19–7
27	December 23	@ Seattle	W 101–98	Dirk Nowitzki (34)	Dirk Nowitzki (13)	Dirk Nowitzki (7)	KeyArena; 16,211	20–7
28	December 26	Indiana	W 102–80	Dirk Nowitzki (23)	Erick Dampier (14)	Devin Harris (5)	American Airlines Center; 20,337	21–7
26	December 30	Golden State	L 109–111	Dirk Nowitzki (24)	Erick Dampier (11)	Marquis Daniels (7)	American Airlines Center; 20,348	21–8
30	December 31	@ New Orleans/Oklahoma City	W 95–90	Dirk Nowitzki (24)	Dirk Nowitzki (10)	Dirk Nowitzki (5)	Ford Center; 19,170	22–8

January: 13–2 (home: 6–0; road: 7–2)

Game	Date	Team	Score	High points	High rebounds	High assists	Location Attendance	Record
31	January 3	Portland	W 95–81	Terry, Nowitzki (22)	Josh Howard (10)	Jason Terry (7)	American Airlines Center; 20,018	23–8
32	January 4	@ Minnesota	L 78–91	Dirk Nowitzki (23)	Erick Dampier (10)	four players tied (2)	Target Center; 15,702	23–9
33	January 6	@ Denver	W 114–112 (OT)	Terry, Nowitzki (27)	Dirk Nowitzki (10)	Jason Terry (7)	Pepsi Center; 18,256	24–9
34	January 7	Minnesota	W 83–79	Dirk Nowitzki (26)	Howard, Dampier (10)	Jason Terry (4)	American Airlines Center; 20,151	25–9
35	January 9	@ Boston	W 104–102	Jason Terry (30)	Nowitzki, Diop (7)	Adrian Griffin (5)	TD Banknorth Garden; 15,064	26–9
36	January 11	@ New York	L 115–117 (OT)	Dirk Nowitzki (32)	Josh Howard (9)	Jason Terry (5)	Madison Square Garden; 17,469	26–10
37	January 14	New Jersey	W 110–77	Josh Howard (29)	DeSagana Diop (7)	Devin Harris (7)	American Airlines Center; 20,367	27–10
38	January 16	Milwaukee	W 114–95	Dirk Nowitzki (35)	Josh Howard (11)	Jason Terry (5)	American Airlines Center; 19,935	28–10
39	January 18	@ Houston	W 103–76	Dirk Nowitzki (29)	Erick Dampier (8)	Jerry Stackhouse (6)	Toyota Center; 15,966	29–10
40	January 20	@ L.A. Clippers	W 101–81	Dirk Nowitzki (26)	Erick Dampier (12)	Jerry Stackhouse (6)	Staples Center; 17,883	30–10
41	January 22	@ Portland	W 95–89 (OT)	Jerry Stackhouse (29)	Erick Dampier (10)	Josh Howard (4)	Rose Garden; 13,042	31–10
42	January 25	@ Golden State	W 102–93	Jerry Stackhouse (23)	Adrian Griffin (10)	Jason Terry (5)	Oakland Arena; 16,842	32–10
43	January 26	@ Seattle	W 104–97	Dirk Nowitzki (29)	Dirk Nowitzki (12)	Jason Terry (4)	KeyArena; 15,891	33–10
44	January 28	Utah	W 103–89	Josh Howard (24)	DeSagana Diop (6)	Terry, Stackhouse (4)	American Airlines Center; 20,394	34–10
45	January 31	Chicago	W 98–94	Josh Howard (22)	Josh Howard (9)	Jason Terry (5)	American Airlines Center; 19,567	35–10

February: 10–1 (home: 9–0; road: 1–1)

Game	Date	Team	Score	High points	High rebounds	High assists	Location Attendance	Record
46	February 1	@ Memphis	W 81–80	Josh Howard (19)	Dirk Nowitzki (12)	Terry, Howard (3)	FedExForum; 15,817	36–10
47	February 4	Seattle	W 110–91	Josh Howard (23)	Erick Dampier (14)	Jerry Stackhouse (7)	American Airlines Center; 20,369	37–10
48	February 7	L.A. Lakers	W 102–87	Dirk Nowitzki (26)	Dirk Nowitzki (12)	Howard, Harris (4)	American Airlines Center; 20,379	38–10
49	February 9	Miami	W 112–76	Dirk Nowitzki (27)	Erick Dampier (11)	Jason Terry (7)	American Airlines Center; 20,273	39–10
50	February 10	@ Denver	L 104–113	Keith Van Horn (21)	Dirk Nowitzki (8)	Jason Terry (10)	Pepsi Center; 18,853	39–11
51	February 13	New York	W 100–72	Dirk Nowitzki (21)	Erick Dampier (12)	Jason Terry (5)	American Airlines Center; 19,749	40–11
52	February 15	Washington	W 103–97	Josh Howard (26)	Erick Dampier (9)	Marquis Daniels (5)	American Airlines Center; 19,714	41–11
All-Star Break
53	February 21	L.A. Clippers	W 93–91	Josh Howard (23)	Dirk Nowitzki (10)	Terry, Griffin (4)	American Airlines Center; 19,584	42–11
54	February 23	Memphis	W 97–87	Dirk Nowitzki (31)	Erick Dampier (10)	Jason Terry (6)	American Airlines Center; 19,912	43–11
55	February 25	Toronto	W 115–113 (OT)	Dirk Nowitzki (32)	Dirk Nowitzki (11)	Jerry Stackhouse (8)	American Airlines Center; 19,791	44–11
56	February 27	Philadelphia	W 104–92	Dirk Nowitzki (32)	Dirk Nowitzki (13)	Marquis Daniels (8)	American Airlines Center; 20,425	45–11

March: 9–8 (home: 4–2; road: 5–6)

Game	Date	Team	Score	High points	High rebounds	High assists	Location Attendance	Record
57	March 2	@ San Antonio	L 89–98	Terry, Nowitzki (23)	Dirk Nowitzki (11)	three players tied (2)	SBC Center; 18,797	45–12
58	March 3	Charlotte	W 90–76	Dirk Nowitzki (26)	Erick Dampier (14)	Marquis Daniels (8)	American Airlines Center; 20,075	46–12
59	March 5	Phoenix	L 107–115	Dirk Nowitzki (25)	Erick Dampier (11)	Dirk Nowitzki (5)	American Airlines Center; 20,340	46–13
60	March 7	Portland	W 93–87	Jason Terry (26)	Dirk Nowitzki (10)	Nowitzki, Harris (4)	American Airlines Center; 20,216	47–13
61	March 9	@ Portland	W 109–92	Dirk Nowitzki (33)	Dirk Nowitzki (10)	Devin Harris (7)	Rose Garden; 15,433	48–13
62	March 11	@ Utah	W 90–87	Dirk Nowitzki (34)	Dirk Nowitzki (9)	Dirk Nowitzki (5)	Delta Center; 19,790	49–13
63	March 12	@ Sacramento	L 80–85	Dirk Nowitzki (24)	Dirk Nowitzki (13)	Nowitzki, Terry (5)	ARCO Arena; 17,317	49–14
64	March 14	Cleveland	W 91–87	Dirk Nowitzki (30)	Nowitzki, Dampier (13)	Dirk Nowitzki (6)	American Airlines Center; 20,425	50–14
65	March 15	@ Houston	W 95–81	Dirk Nowitzki (30)	Dirk Nowitzki (11)	Jason Terry (4)	Toyota Center; 18,222	51–14
66	March 17	@ Washington	W 104–94	Nowitzki, Terry (25)	Dirk Nowitzki (13)	Marquis Daniels (8)	MCI Center; 18,954	52–14
67	March 19	@ New Jersey	L 89–100	Dirk Nowitzki (37)	Dirk Nowitzki (8)	Terry, Stackhouse (5)	Continental Airlines Arena; 18,883	52–15
68	March 21	Houston	W 88–72	Dirk Nowitzki (28)	Erick Dampier (9)	Jerry Stackhouse (5)	American Airlines Center; 20,283	53–15
69	March 23	Golden State	L 121–122	Dirk Nowitzki (51)	Erick Dampier (10)	Jason Terry (7)	American Airlines Center; 20,165	53–16
70	March 25	@ Atlanta	W 98–83	Dirk Nowitzki (27)	Dirk Nowitzki (13)	Terry, Daniels (3)	Philips Arena; 18,729	54–16
71	March 28	@ Detroit	L 90–97	Nowitzki, Stackhouse (25)	Dirk Nowitzki (11)	Jason Terry (7)	The Palace of Auburn Hills; 22,076	54–17
72	March 29	@ Cleveland	L 94–107	Dirk Nowitzki (29)	Erick Dampier (6)	Jason Terry (4)	Quicken Loans Arena; 19,401	54–18
73	March 31	@ Orlando	L 99–108	Dirk Nowitzki (38)	Dirk Nowitzki (15)	Jerry Stackhouse (5)	TD Waterhouse Centre; 17,283	54–19

April: 6–3 (home: 4–1; road: 2–2)

Game	Date	Team	Score	High points	High rebounds	High assists	Location Attendance	Record
74	April 2	Denver	W 103–79	Dirk Nowitzki (30)	Dirk Nowitzki (12)	Nowitzki, Terry (4)	American Airlines Center; 20,251	55–19
75	April 4	Sacramento	W 127–101	Dirk Nowitzki (29)	Howard, Dampier (8)	Jason Terry (8)	American Airlines Center; 20,128	56–19
76	April 7	@ San Antonio	W 92–86	Dirk Nowitzki (30)	Nowitzki, Howard (10)	Jason Terry (4)	SBC Center; 18,797	57–19
77	April 8	New Orleans/Oklahoma City	W 101–77	Dirk Nowitzki (20)	Erick Dampier (10)	Jerry Stackhouse (8)	American Airlines Center; 20,336	58–19
78	April 10	@ L.A. Clippers	W 75–73	Dirk Nowitzki (20)	Dirk Nowitzki (14)	Stackhouse, Daniels (4)	Staples Center; 17,691	59–19
79	April 12	@ Golden State	L 102–114	Dirk Nowitzki (29)	Dirk Nowitzki (10)	Jason Terry (6)	Oakland Arena; 17,527	59–20
80	April 13	@ Phoenix	L 104–117	Dirk Nowitzki (36)	Dirk Nowitzki (11)	Jason Terry (3)	US Airways Center; 18,422	59–21
81	April 16	Utah	W 111–95	Dirk Nowitzki (22)	Erick Dampier (12)	Jason Terry (6)	American Airlines Center; 19,961	60–21
82	April 19	L.A. Clippers	L 71–85	Rawle Marshall (13)	Powell, Diop (9)	Powell, Griffin (2)	American Airlines Center; 20,315	60–22

2005–06 schedule

== Playoffs ==
2006 playoff game log
First Round: 4–0 (home: 2–0; road: 2–0)

Game	Date	Team	Score	High points	High rebounds	High assists	Location Attendance	Series
1	April 23	Memphis	W 103–93	Dirk Nowitzki (31)	Erick Dampier (12)	Jason Terry (4)	American Airlines Center; 20,340	1–0
2	April 26	Memphis	W 94–79	Dirk Nowitzki (31)	three players tied (6)	Jason Terry (9)	American Airlines Center; 20,612	2–0
3	April 29	@ Memphis	W 94–89 (OT)	Dirk Nowitzki (36)	three players tied (9)	Dirk Nowitzki (5)	FedExForum; 17,871	3–0
4	May 1	@ Memphis	W 102–76	Dirk Nowitzki (27)	Josh Howard (9)	Stackhouse, Terry (5)	FedExForum; 15,104	4–0

Conference Semifinals: 4–3 (home: 2–1; road: 2–2)

Game	Date	Team	Score	High points	High rebounds	High assists	Location Attendance	Series
1	May 7	@ San Antonio	L 85–87	Jerry Stackhouse (24)	Dirk Nowitzki (14)	Marquis Daniels (3)	AT&T Center; 18,797	0–1
2	May 9	@ San Antonio	W 113–91	Josh Howard (27)	Howard, Nowitzki (9)	three players tied (3)	AT&T Center; 18,797	1–1
3	May 13	San Antonio	W 104–103	Dirk Nowitzki (27)	Dirk Nowitzki (15)	Jason Terry (4)	American Airlines Center; 20,865	2–1
4	May 15	San Antonio	W 123–118 (OT)	Jason Terry (32)	Dampier, Nowitzki (9)	Devin Harris (6)	American Airlines Center; 20,969	3–1
5	May 17	@ San Antonio	L 97–98	Dirk Nowitzki (31)	Dirk Nowitzki (12)	Jason Terry (5)	AT&T Center; 18,797	3–2
6	May 19	San Antonio	L 86–91	Dirk Nowitzki (26)	Dirk Nowitzki (21)	Dirk Nowitzki (5)	American Airlines Center; 20,986	3–3
7	May 22	@ San Antonio	W 119–111 (OT)	Dirk Nowitzki (37)	Dirk Nowitzki (15)	Jerry Stackhouse (6)	AT&T Center	4–3

Conference Finals: 4–2 (home: 2–1; road: 2–1)

Game	Date	Team	Score	High points	High rebounds	High assists	Location Attendance	Series
1	May 24	Phoenix	L 118–121	Devin Harris (30)	Dirk Nowitzki (19)	Terry, Stackhouse (3)	American Airlines Center; 20,789	0–1
2	May 26	Phoenix	W 105–98	Dirk Nowitzki (30)	Dirk Nowitzki (14)	Dirk Nowitzki (6)	American Airlines Center; 20,934	1–1
3	May 28	@ Phoenix	W 95–88	Dirk Nowitzki (28)	Dirk Nowitzki (17)	Dirk Nowitzki (5)	US Airways Center; 18,422	2–1
4	May 30	@ Phoenix	L 86–106	Josh Howard (16)	Josh Howard (9)	Devin Harris (5)	US Airways Center; 18,422	2–2
5	June 1	Phoenix	W 117–101	Dirk Nowitzki (50)	Dirk Nowitzki (12)	Jason Terry (9)	American Airlines Center; 20,977	3–2
6	June 3	@ Phoenix	W 102–93	Dirk Nowitzki (24)	Josh Howard (15)	Nowitzki, Terry (3)	US Airways Center; 18,422	4–2

NBA Finals: 2–4 (home: 2–1; road: 0–3)

Game	Date	Team	Score	High points	High rebounds	High assists	Location Attendance	Series
1	June 8, 2006; 8:00 p.m. CDT	Miami	W 90–80	Terry (32)	Howard (12)	Howard, Nowitzki; Stackhouse (4)	American Airlines Center; 20,475	1–0
2	June 11, 2006; 8:00 p.m. CDT	Miami	W 99–85	Nowitzki (26)	Nowitzki (16)	Terry (9)	American Airlines Center; 20,459	2–0
3	June 13, 2006; 8:00 p.m. CDT	@ Miami	L 96–98	Nowitzki (30)	Dampier (9)	Terry (5)	American Airlines Arena; 20,145	2–1
4	June 15, 2006; 8:00 p.m. CDT	@ Miami	L 74–98	Terry (17)	Nowitzki (9)	Stackhuse (4)	American Airlines Arena; 20,145	2–2
5	June 18, 2006; 8:00 p.m. CDT	@ Miami	L 100–101 (OT)	Terry (35)	Howard (10)	Daniels (4)	American Airlines Arena; 20,145	2–3
6	June 20, 2006; 8:00 p.m. CDT	Miami	L 92–95	Nowitzki (29)	Nowitzki (15)	Terry (5)	American Airlines Center; 20,522	2–4

2006 schedule

== Player statistics ==
=== Regular season ===
Player	POS	GP	GS	MP	REB	AST	STL	BLK	PTS	MPG	RPG	APG	SPG	BPG	PPG
Erick Dampier	C	82	36	1,934	640	51	27	106	469	23.6	7.8	.6	.3	1.3	5.7
Dirk Nowitzki	PF	81	81	3,089	728	226	58	83	2,151	38.1	9.0	2.8	.7	1.0	26.6
DeSagana Diop	C	81	45	1,510	374	23	44	146	190	18.6	4.6	.3	.5	1.8	2.3
Jason Terry	PG	80	80	2,798	158	306	100	27	1,371	35.0	2.0	3.8	1.3	.3	17.1
Marquis Daniels	SG	62	29	1,766	224	172	67	13	634	28.5	3.6	2.8	1.1	.2	10.2
Darrell Armstrong	PG	62	2	622	81	86	27	3	130	10.0	1.3	1.4	.4	.0	2.1
Josh Howard	SF	59	58	1,915	371	111	68	26	923	32.5	6.3	1.9	1.2	.4	15.6
Devin Harris	PG	56	4	1,275	125	177	53	16	554	22.8	2.2	3.2	.9	.3	9.9
Jerry Stackhouse	SG	55	11	1,525	153	160	37	10	715	27.7	2.8	2.9	.7	.2	13.0
Keith Van Horn	SF	53	0	1,090	192	37	31	11	472	20.6	3.6	.7	.6	.2	8.9
Adrian Griffin	SG	52	45	1,245	227	89	51	9	237	23.9	4.4	1.7	1.0	.2	4.6
D. J. Mbenga	C	43	1	237	56	2	6	25	74	5.5	1.3	.0	.1	.6	1.7
Josh Powell	PF	37	2	429	81	9	7	4	110	11.6	2.2	.2	.2	.1	3.0
Rawle Marshall	SF	23	9	241	31	10	8	7	71	10.5	1.3	.4	.3	.3	3.1
Doug Christie	SG	7	7	185	13	14	9	1	26	26.4	1.9	2.0	1.3	.1	3.7
Pavel Podkolzin	C	1	0	18	7	0	0	1	3	18.0	7.0	.0	.0	1.0	3.0

=== Playoffs ===
Player	POS	GP	GS	MP	REB	AST	STL	BLK	PTS	MPG	RPG	APG	SPG	BPG	PPG
Dirk Nowitzki	PF	23	23	983	268	67	25	14	620	42.7	11.7	2.9	1.1	.6	27.0
Josh Howard	SF	23	23	824	171	32	23	14	384	35.8	7.4	1.4	1.0	.6	16.7
Devin Harris	PG	23	15	558	39	50	18	3	216	24.3	1.7	2.2	.8	.1	9.4
Jason Terry	PG	22	22	844	64	83	26	1	416	38.4	2.9	3.8	1.2	.0	18.9
DeSagana Diop	C	22	18	407	109	2	14	28	59	18.5	5.0	.1	.6	1.3	2.7
Jerry Stackhouse	SG	22	1	711	62	56	12	6	302	32.3	2.8	2.5	.5	.3	13.7
Adrian Griffin	SG	20	8	349	71	24	15	2	71	17.5	3.6	1.2	.8	.1	3.6
Marquis Daniels	SG	20	0	222	21	26	5	1	68	11.1	1.1	1.3	.3	.1	3.4
Erick Dampier	C	19	2	454	127	6	11	24	95	23.9	6.7	.3	.6	1.3	5.0
Keith Van Horn	SF	14	3	172	32	2	0	4	51	12.3	2.3	.1	.0	.3	3.6
Darrell Armstrong	PG	11	0	47	7	2	3	1	8	4.3	.6	.2	.3	.1	.7
D. J. Mbenga	C	7	0	25	8	0	0	1	4	3.6	1.1	.0	.0	.1	.6
Josh Powell	PF	6	0	25	2	1	0	0	0	4.2	.3	.2	.0	.0	.0

== Awards ==
- Avery Johnson, NBA Coach of the Year Award
- Dirk Nowitzki, All-NBA First Team
- Dirk Nowitzki, NBA All-Star Game
- Dirk Nowitzki, NBA All-Star Weekend Three Point Shootout Champion

== See also ==
- 2005–06 NBA season
