= 2005–06 Portland Trail Blazers season =

NBA professional basketball team season

- Head coach: Nate McMillan
- General manager: John Nash
- Owner: Paul Allen
- Arena: Rose Garden

Results
- Record: 21–61 (.256)
- Place: Division: 5th (Northwest); Conference: 15th (Western)
- Playoff finish: Did not qualify
- Stats at Basketball Reference

Local media
- Television: KGW; FSN Northwest
- Radio: KXL

The 2005–06 Portland Trail Blazers season was the team's 36th in the NBA and their first with new coach Nate McMillan. The team began the season hoping to improve upon their 27–55 output from the previous season. However, they came up six games shy of tying it, finishing 21–61 and failing to qualify for the playoffs for the third straight season.

== Draft picks ==
Round	Pick	Player	Position	Nationality	College / Club Team
1	6	Martell Webster	G/F	United States	
1	27	Linas Kleiza	F	Lithuania	Missouri
2	35	Ricky Sanchez	F	Puerto Rico	

== Roster ==
Portland Trail Blazers roster
Players

Pos.	No.	Player	Height	Weight	DOB	From
PG	2	Steve Blake	6 ft 3 in (1.91 m)	172 lb (78 kg)		Maryland
SG	3	Juan Dixon	6 ft 3 in (1.91 m)	165 lb (75 kg)		Maryland
PG	1	Jarrett Jack	6 ft 3 in (1.91 m)	200 lb (91 kg)		Georgia Tech
SF	38	Viktor Khryapa	6 ft 9 in (2.06 m)	235 lb (107 kg)		Russia
SG	0	Voshon Lenard	6 ft 4 in (1.93 m)	205 lb (93 kg)		Minnesota
SF	23	Darius Miles	6 ft 9 in (2.06 m)	235 lb (107 kg)		East St. Louis HS (IL)
SF	25	Travis Outlaw	6 ft 9 in (2.06 m)	220 lb (100 kg)		Starkville HS (MS)
C	10	Joel Przybilla	7 ft 1 in (2.16 m)	245 lb (111 kg)		Minnesota
PF	50	Zach Randolph	6 ft 9 in (2.06 m)	260 lb (118 kg)		Michigan State
C	42	Theo Ratliff	6 ft 10 in (2.08 m)	235 lb (107 kg)		Wyoming
C	5	Ha Seung-jin	7 ft 3 in (2.21 m)	305 lb (138 kg)		Yonsei
C	54	Brian Skinner	6 ft 9 in (2.06 m)	255 lb (116 kg)		Baylor
PG	31	Sebastian Telfair	6 ft 0 in (1.83 m)	170 lb (77 kg)		Lincoln HS (Brooklyn)
SF	8	Martell Webster	6 ft 7 in (2.01 m)	230 lb (104 kg)		Seattle Prep HS (WA)

Coaches
Head coach
- Nate McMillan
Assistant(s)
- Dean Demopoulos (West Chester)
- Tim Grgurich (Pittsburgh)
- Maurice Lucas (Marquette)
- Monty Williams (Notre Dame)

Legend
- (DP) Unsigned draft pick
- (FA) Free agent
- (S) Suspended
- Injured

Roster

== Regular season ==
=== Season standings ===
Northwest Division	W	L	PCT	GB	Home	Road	Div
y-Denver Nuggets	44	38	.537	-	26–15	18–23	10–6
Utah Jazz	41	41	.500	3	22–19	19–22	11–5
Seattle SuperSonics	35	47	.427	9	22–19	13–28	10–6
Minnesota Timberwolves	33	49	.402	11	24–17	9–32	6–10
Portland Trail Blazers	21	61	.256	23	15–26	6–35	3–13

#	Western Conference				
#	Team	W	L	PCT	GB
1	c-San Antonio Spurs	63	19	.768	-
2	y-Phoenix Suns	54	28	.659	9
3	y-Denver Nuggets	44	38	.537	19
4	x-Dallas Mavericks	60	22	.732	3
5	x-Memphis Grizzlies	49	33	.598	14
6	x-Los Angeles Clippers	47	35	.573	16
7	x-Los Angeles Lakers	45	37	.549	18
8	x-Sacramento Kings	44	38	.537	19
9	Utah Jazz	41	41	.500	22
10	New Orleans/Oklahoma City Hornets	38	44	.463	25
11	Seattle SuperSonics	35	47	.427	28
12	Golden State Warriors	34	48	.415	29
13	Houston Rockets	34	48	.415	29
14	Minnesota Timberwolves	33	49	.402	30
15	Portland Trail Blazers	21	61	.256	42

z - clinched division title
y - clinched division title
x - clinched playoff spot

== Player statistics ==
Legend
GP	Games played	GS	Games started	MPG	Minutes per game
FG%	Field-goal percentage	3P%	3-point field-goal percentage	FT%	Free-throw percentage
RPG	Rebounds per game	APG	Assists per game	SPG	Steals per game
BPG	Blocks per game	PPG	Points per game

=== Regular season ===
Player	GP	GS	MPG	FG%	3P%	FT%	RPG	APG	SPG	BPG	PPG
Jarrett Jack	79	4	20.2	.442	.263	.800	2.0	2.8	.5	.0	6.7
Juan Dixon	76	42	25.3	.435	.382	.804	2.3	2.0	.8	.1	12.3
Zach Randolph	74	71	34.4	.436	.291	.714	8.0	1.9	.8	.2	18.0
Victor Khryapa	69	53	21.6	.462	.333	.694	4.4	1.3	.7	.4	5.8
Travis Outlaw	69	11	16.7	.440	.264	.697	2.7	.5	.4	.7	5.8
Steve Blake	68	57	26.2	.438	.413	.791	2.1	4.5	.6	.1	8.2
Sebastian Telfair	68	30	24.1	.394	.352	.743	1.8	3.6	1.0	.1	9.5
Martell Webster	61	18	17.5	.399	.357	.859	2.1	.6	.3	.2	6.6
Joel Przybilla	56	52	24.9	.548		.532	7.0	.8	.4	2.3	6.1
Theo Ratliff	55	19	23.7	.571		.651	5.1	.5	.3	1.6	4.9
Ruben Patterson^{†}	45	2	23.5	.496	.000	.611	3.4	1.3	.9	.3	11.4
Darius Miles	40	23	32.2	.461	.200	.534	4.6	1.8	1.1	1.0	14.0
Brian Skinner^{†}	27	5	19.1	.484		.517	4.7	.5	.5	.9	3.8
Ha Seung-jin	27	4	7.9	.581		.471	1.8	.0	.1	.3	1.6
Sergei Monia^{†}	23	15	14.6	.341	.273	.667	2.2	.8	.3	.2	3.3
Charles Smith^{†}	21	4	9.9	.423	.405	.625	.8	.4	.2	.3	3.8
Voshon Lenard^{†}	14	0	15.7	.375	.349	.611	1.4	1.6	.9	.1	6.6

- ^{†} Denotes player spent time with another team in the season. Stats reflect time with the Trail Blazers only.
