= 2005–06 Houston Rockets season =

- Head coach: Jeff Van Gundy
- General manager: Carroll Dawson
- Owner: Leslie Alexander
- Arena: Toyota Center

Results
- Record: 34–48 (.415)
- Place: Division: 5th (Southwest); Conference: 13th (Western)
- Playoff finish: Did not qualify
- Stats at Basketball Reference

Local media
- Television: KNWS; FSN Houston
- Radio: KILT

The 2005-06 Houston Rockets season was the team's 39th in the NBA. They began the season hoping to improve upon their 51–31 output from the previous season. However, they came up seventeen games shy of tying it, finishing 34–48, and failing to qualify for the playoffs for the first time in three seasons. Tracy McGrady played in only 47 games after complaining about back spasms while Yao Ming missed time due to foot injuries. Despite their injuries, they were still voted to play in the 2006 NBA All-Star Game held in Houston.

== Roster ==
2005–06 Houston Rockets roster
Players

Pos.	No.	Player	Height	Weight	DOB	From
G	12	Rafer Alston	6 ft 2 in (1.88 m)	190 lb (86 kg)	1976-07-24	Fresno State
F	10	Keith Bogans	6 ft 5 in (1.96 m)	215 lb (98 kg)	1980-05-12	Kentucky
F	40	Ryan Bowen	6 ft 7 in (2.01 m)	215 lb (98 kg)	1975-11-20	Iowa
G	9	Rick Brunson	6 ft 4 in (1.93 m)	190 lb (86 kg)	1972-06-14	Temple
G	14	Richie Frahm	6 ft 5 in (1.96 m)	210 lb (95 kg)	1977-08-14	Gonzaga
F	44	Chuck Hayes	6 ft 6 in (1.98 m)	250 lb (113 kg)	1983-06-11	Kentucky
G	2	Luther Head	6 ft 3 in (1.91 m)	185 lb (84 kg)	1982-11-26	Illinois
F	5	Juwan Howard	6 ft 9 in (2.06 m)	240 lb (109 kg)	1973-02-07	Michigan
C	15	Maciej Lampe	6 ft 11 in (2.11 m)	275 lb (125 kg)	1985-02-05	Poland
F	1	Tracy McGrady	6 ft 8 in (2.03 m)	225 lb (102 kg)	1979-05-24	Mt. Zion Christian Academy (HS)
C	55	Dikembe Mutombo	7 ft 2 in (2.18 m)	260 lb (118 kg)	1966-06-25	Georgetown
G	3	Bob Sura	6 ft 5 in (1.96 m)	200 lb (91 kg)	1973-03-25	Florida State
C	4	Stromile Swift	6 ft 9 in (2.06 m)	225 lb (102 kg)	1979-11-21	LSU
G	7	David Wesley	6 ft 1 in (1.85 m)	203 lb (92 kg)	1970-11-14	Baylor
C	11	Yao Ming	7 ft 6 in (2.29 m)	310 lb (141 kg)	1980-09-12	China

Coaches
Head coach
- Jeff Van Gundy
Assistant(s)
- Steve Clifford
- Patrick Ewing
- Andy Greer
- Jim Sann
- Tom Thibodeau

Legend
- (DP) Unsigned draft pick
- (FA) Free agent
- (S) Suspended
- Injured

Roster
Updated: March 20, 2006

=== Roster notes ===
- Small forward Tracy McGrady played 47 games (his last game being on March 8, 2006) but missed the rest of the season due to severe back spasms.
- Point guard Bob Sura missed the entire season after undergoing surgery to repair a ruptured disc in his back.

== Regular season ==
Southwest Division	W	L	PCT	GB	Home	Road	Div
y-San Antonio Spurs	63	19	.768	-	34–7	29–12	13–3
x-Dallas Mavericks	60	22	.732	3	34–7	26–15	13–3
x-Memphis Grizzlies	49	33	.598	14	30–11	19–22	6–10
New Orleans/Oklahoma City Hornets	38	44	.463	25	24–17	14–27	7–9
Houston Rockets	34	48	.415	29	15–26	19–22	1–15

#	Western Conference				
#	Team	W	L	PCT	GB
1	c-San Antonio Spurs	63	19	.768	-
2	y-Phoenix Suns	54	28	.659	9
3	y-Denver Nuggets	44	38	.537	19
4	x-Dallas Mavericks	60	22	.732	3
5	x-Memphis Grizzlies	49	33	.598	14
6	x-Los Angeles Clippers	47	35	.573	16
7	x-Los Angeles Lakers	45	37	.549	18
8	x-Sacramento Kings	44	38	.537	19
9	Utah Jazz	41	41	.500	22
10	New Orleans/Oklahoma City Hornets	38	44	.463	25
11	Seattle SuperSonics	35	47	.427	28
12	Golden State Warriors	34	48	.415	29
13	Houston Rockets	34	48	.415	29
14	Minnesota Timberwolves	33	49	.402	30
15	Portland Trail Blazers	21	61	.256	42

== Player statistics ==
Legend
GP	Games played	GS	Games started	MPG	Minutes per game
FG%	Field-goal percentage	3P%	3-point field-goal percentage	FT%	Free-throw percentage
RPG	Rebounds per game	APG	Assists per game	SPG	Steals per game
BPG	Blocks per game	PPG	Points per game

=== Regular season ===
Houston Rockets statistics
Player	GP	GS	MPG	FG%	3P%	FT%	RPG	APG	SPG	BPG	PPG
Juwan Howard	80	80	31.7	.459	.000	.806	6.7	1.4	.6	.1	11.8
Luther Head	80	27	28.9	.403	.361	.699	3.3	2.7	1.1	.1	8.8
David Wesley	71	59	33.4	.403	.365	.807	2.5	2.9	.8	.1	9.9
Ryan Bowen	68	19	9.6	.298	.136	.786	1.3	.4	.3	.1	1.3
Stromile Swift	66	5	20.4	.491	.000	.651	4.4	.4	.6	.8	8.9
Dikembe Mutombo	64	23	14.9	.526		.758	4.8	.1	.3	.9	2.6
Rafer Alston	63	63	38.6	.379	.327	.692	4.0	6.7	1.6	.2	12.1
Yao Ming	57	57	34.2	.519	.000	.853	10.2	1.5	.5	1.6	22.3
Tracy McGrady	47	47	37.1	.406	.312	.747	6.5	4.8	1.3	.9	24.4
Chuck Hayes	40	0	13.4	.562	.000	.644	4.5	.4	.7	.4	3.7
Keith Bogans^{†}	33	22	32.2	.395	.314	.580	4.5	2.5	1.0	.2	8.5
Moochie Norris^{†}	29	0	8.3	.400	.000	.765	1.2	1.0	.5	.0	2.2
Lonny Baxter^{†}	23	0	12.2	.458		.842	3.7	.1	.4	.3	3.6
Rick Brunson^{†}	23	0	9.3	.348	.417	.583	.9	1.4	.3	.0	1.9
Derek Anderson^{†}	20	8	29.1	.393	.284	.836	4.2	2.7	.8	.2	10.8
Jon Barry	20	0	17.1	.385	.375	.828	1.6	1.3	.7	.1	4.3
John Lucas III	13	0	8.2	.389	.222		.4	.9	.4	.0	2.3
Richie Frahm^{†}	8	0	14.6	.429	.364	.800	1.3	.8	.1	.0	5.3
Stephen Graham^{†}	6	0	6.3	.375	.200	1.000	1.2	.5	.3	.0	2.8
Maciej Lampe^{†}	4	0	3.0	.286		.000	1.3	.0	.0	.0	1.0
Josh Davis^{†}	1	0	0.0				.0	.0	.0	.0	.0

- ^{†} Denotes player spent time with another team in the season. Stats reflect time with the Rockets only.

== Awards ==
- Yao Ming, All-NBA Third Team
- Luther Head, NBA All-Rookie Team 2nd Team
