= 2005–06 Seattle SuperSonics season =

NBA professional basketball team season

- Head coach: Bob Weiss (fired) (13–17); Bob Hill (22–30)
- General manager: Rick Sund
- Owner: Howard Schultz
- Arena: KeyArena at Seattle Center

Results
- Record: 35–47 (.427)
- Place: Division: 3rd (Northwest); Conference: 11th (Western)
- Playoff finish: Did not qualify
- Stats at Basketball Reference

Local media
- Television: KONG; FSN Northwest
- Radio: KJR

The 2005–06 Seattle SuperSonics season was the team's 39th in the NBA. They began the season hoping to improve upon their 52-30 output from the previous season. However, they came seventeen games shy of tying it, finishing 35–47 and failing to qualify for the playoffs.

== Draft picks ==
Round	Pick	Player	Position	Nationality	College/club team
1	25	Johan Petro	C	France	Élan Béarnais Pau-Orthez
2	48	Mickaël Gelabale	SF	France	Real Madrid
2	55	Lawrence Roberts	PF	United States	Mississippi State

== Roster ==
2005–06 Seattle SuperSonics roster
Players

Pos.	No.	Player	Height	Weight	DOB	From
SG	34	Ray Allen	6 ft 5 in (1.96 m)	205 lb (93 kg)	1975-07-20	Connecticut
PG	24	Mateen Cleaves	6 ft 2 in (1.88 m)	205 lb (93 kg)	1977-09-07	Michigan State
PF	4	Nick Collison	6 ft 10 in (2.08 m)	255 lb (116 kg)	1980-10-26	Kansas
SF	16	Noel Felix	6 ft 9 in (2.06 m)	225 lb (102 kg)	1981-10-04	Fresno State
C	21	Danny Fortson	6 ft 7 in (2.01 m)	260 lb (118 kg)	1976-03-27	Cincinnati
SF	7	Rashard Lewis	6 ft 10 in (2.08 m)	215 lb (98 kg)	1979-08-08	Alief Elsik HS (TX)
C	33	Mikki Moore	6 ft 11 in (2.11 m)	225 lb (102 kg)	1975-11-04	Nebraska
C	27	Johan Petro	7 ft 0 in (2.13 m)	247 lb (112 kg)	1986-01-27	France
PG	8	Luke Ridnour	6 ft 2 in (1.88 m)	175 lb (79 kg)	1981-02-13	Oregon
C	31	Robert Swift	7 ft 1 in (2.16 m)	245 lb (111 kg)	1985-12-03	Bakersfield HS (CA)
PG	25	Earl Watson	6 ft 1 in (1.85 m)	185 lb (84 kg)	1979-06-12	UCLA
PF	54	Chris Wilcox	6 ft 10 in (2.08 m)	235 lb (107 kg)	1982-09-03	Maryland
SF	12	Damien Wilkins	6 ft 6 in (1.98 m)	225 lb (102 kg)	1980-01-11	Georgia
PG	29	Mike Wilks	5 ft 10 in (1.78 m)	180 lb (82 kg)	1979-05-07	Rice

Coaches
Head coach
- Bob Weiss (fired)
- Bob Hill
Assistant(s)
- Dwight Daub
- Walt Rock
- Jack Sikma

Legend
- (DP) Unsigned draft pick
- (FA) Free agent
- (S) Suspended
- Injured

Roster
Updated: March 8, 2006

== Regular season ==
=== Standings ===
Northwest Division	W	L	PCT	GB	Home	Road	Div
y-Denver Nuggets	44	38	.537	-	26–15	18–23	10–6
Utah Jazz	41	41	.500	3	22–19	19–22	11–5
Seattle SuperSonics	35	47	.427	9	22–19	13–28	10–6
Minnesota Timberwolves	33	49	.402	11	24–17	9–32	6–10
Portland Trail Blazers	21	61	.256	23	15–26	6–35	3–13

#	Western Conference				
#	Team	W	L	PCT	GB
1	c-San Antonio Spurs	63	19	.768	-
2	y-Phoenix Suns	54	28	.659	9
3	y-Denver Nuggets	44	38	.537	19
4	x-Dallas Mavericks	60	22	.732	3
5	x-Memphis Grizzlies	49	33	.598	14
6	x-Los Angeles Clippers	47	35	.573	16
7	x-Los Angeles Lakers	45	37	.549	18
8	x-Sacramento Kings	44	38	.537	19
9	Utah Jazz	41	41	.500	22
10	New Orleans/Oklahoma City Hornets	38	44	.463	25
11	Seattle SuperSonics	35	47	.427	28
12	Golden State Warriors	34	48	.415	29
13	Houston Rockets	34	48	.415	29
14	Minnesota Timberwolves	33	49	.402	30
15	Portland Trail Blazers	21	61	.256	42

== Player statistics ==
Legend
GP	Games played	GS	Games started	MPG	Minutes per game
FG%	Field-goal percentage	3P%	3-point field-goal percentage	FT%	Free-throw percentage
RPG	Rebounds per game	APG	Assists per game	SPG	Steals per game
BPG	Blocks per game	PPG	Points per game

Player	GP	GS	MPG	FG%	3P%	FT%	RPG	APG	SPG	BPG	PPG
Ray Allen	78	78	38.7	.454	.412	.903	4.3	3.7	1.3	0.2	25.1
Rick Brunson	4	0	7.8	.625	.000		0.5	0.5	0.0	0.0	2.5
Mateen Cleaves	27	0	8.5	.352	.250	.792	0.5	1.6	0.1	0.1	2.7
Nick Collison	66	27	21.9	.525	.000	.699	5.6	1.1	0.3	0.5	7.5
Reggie Evans	41	23	19.2	.509	.000	.550	6.7	0.6	0.6	0.1	5.9
Noel Felix	12	0	6.8	.240	.333	.625	1.1	0.2	0.2	0.3	1.5
Danny Fortson	23	1	12.0	.529		.767	3.4	0.1	0.2	0.1	3.8
Rashard Lewis	78	77	36.9	.467	.384	.818	5.0	2.3	1.3	0.6	20.1
Mikki Moore	47	1	12.4	.435	.000	.742	2.8	0.6	0.1	0.3	3.3
Ronald Murray	48	2	22.6	.397	.224	.717	1.8	2.5	0.6	0.1	9.9
Johan Petro	68	41	18.9	.510		.627	4.4	0.2	0.4	0.8	5.2
Vitaly Potapenko	24	12	13.4	.500		.588	2.6	0.3	0.1	0.1	3.1
Vladimir Radmanovic	47	16	23.2	.401	.367	.887	4.0	1.5	0.7	0.3	9.3
Luke Ridnour	79	77	33.2	.418	.289	.877	3.0	7.0	1.6	0.3	11.5
Robert Swift	47	20	21.0	.515		.582	5.6	0.2	0.3	1.2	6.4
Earl Watson	24	0	25.1	.432	.420	.731	3.0	5.4	1.3	0.1	11.5
Chris Wilcox	29	23	30.1	.592		.787	8.2	1.2	0.6	0.4	14.1
Damien Wilkins	82	12	18.6	.444	.250	.840	2.3	1.3	0.9	0.1	6.5
Mike Wilks	10	0	10.5	.387	.200	.655	1.2	1.4	0.9	0.0	4.4
