= 2005–06 Golden State Warriors season =

NBA professional basketball team season

- Head coach: Mike Montgomery
- General manager: Chris Mullin
- Owner: Chris Cohan
- Arena: Oakland Arena

Results
- Record: 34–48 (.415)
- Place: Division: 5th (Pacific); Conference: 12th (Western)
- Playoff finish: Did not qualify
- Stats at Basketball Reference

Local media
- Television: FSN Bay Area
- Radio: KNBR

The 2005–06 Golden State Warriors season was the team's 60th in the NBA, and their 44th in Oakland. They began the season hoping to improve upon their 34-48 output from the previous season. They tied it exactly, finishing 34-48 again, but failed to qualify for the playoffs for the twelfth straight season.

== Draft ==
Round	Pick	Player	Position	Nationality	School / club team
1	9	Ike Diogu	PF	Nigeria	Arizona State
2	40	Monta Ellis	PG	United States	Lanier HS
2	42	Chris Taft	C	United States	Pittsburgh

== Roster ==
2005–06 Golden State Warriors roster
Players

Pos.	No.	Player	Height	Weight	DOB	From
C	15	Andris Biedriņš	7 ft 0 in (2.13 m)	250 lb (113 kg)	1986-04-02	Latvia
G	3	Will Bynum	6 ft 0 in (1.83 m)	185 lb (84 kg)	1983-01-04	Georgia Tech
F	11	Žarko Čabarkapa	6 ft 11 in (2.11 m)	235 lb (107 kg)	1981-05-21	Serbia
F	40	Calbert Cheaney	6 ft 7 in (2.01 m)	209 lb (95 kg)	1971-07-17	Indiana
G	5	Baron Davis	6 ft 3 in (1.91 m)	212 lb (96 kg)	1979-04-13	UCLA
F	9	Ike Diogu	6 ft 9 in (2.06 m)	255 lb (116 kg)	1983-09-11	Arizona State
F	34	Mike Dunleavy Jr.	6 ft 9 in (2.06 m)	230 lb (104 kg)	1980-09-15	Duke
G	8	Monta Ellis	6 ft 3 in (1.91 m)	185 lb (84 kg)	1985-10-26	Lanier (HS)
G	4	Derek Fisher	6 ft 1 in (1.85 m)	210 lb (95 kg)	1974-08-09	Little Rock
C	31	Adonal Foyle	6 ft 10 in (2.08 m)	270 lb (122 kg)	1975-03-09	Colgate
F	1	Troy Murphy	6 ft 11 in (2.11 m)	245 lb (111 kg)	1980-05-02	Notre Dame
F	2	Mickaël Piétrus	6 ft 6 in (1.98 m)	215 lb (98 kg)	1982-02-07	France
G	23	Jason Richardson	6 ft 6 in (1.98 m)	225 lb (102 kg)	1981-01-20	Michigan State
F/C	21	Chris Taft	6 ft 10 in (2.08 m)	261 lb (118 kg)	1985-03-10	Pittsburgh

Coaches
Head coach
- Mike Montgomery
Assistant(s)
- Mario Elie
- John MacLeod
- Travis Schlenk
- Keith Smart
- Russell Turner

Legend
- (DP) Unsigned draft pick
- (FA) Free agent
- (S) Suspended
- (DL) On assignment to D-League affiliate
- (L) On leave from the team
- Injured

Roster
Updated: April 17, 2006

== Regular season ==
=== Season standings ===
Pacific Division	W	L	PCT	GB	Home	Road	Div
y-Phoenix Suns	54	28	.659	-	31–10	23–18	10–6
x-Los Angeles Clippers	47	35	.573	7	27–14	20–21	7–9
x-Los Angeles Lakers	45	37	.549	9	27–14	18–23	9–7
x-Sacramento Kings	44	38	.537	10	27–14	17–24	10–6
Golden State Warriors	34	48	.415	20	21–20	13–28	4–12

#	Western Conference				
#	Team	W	L	PCT	GB
1	c-San Antonio Spurs	63	19	.768	-
2	y-Phoenix Suns	54	28	.659	9
3	y-Denver Nuggets	44	38	.537	19
4	x-Dallas Mavericks	60	22	.732	3
5	x-Memphis Grizzlies	49	33	.598	14
6	x-Los Angeles Clippers	47	35	.573	16
7	x-Los Angeles Lakers	45	37	.549	18
8	x-Sacramento Kings	44	38	.537	19
9	Utah Jazz	41	41	.500	22
10	New Orleans/Oklahoma City Hornets	38	44	.463	25
11	Seattle SuperSonics	35	47	.427	28
12	Golden State Warriors	34	48	.415	29
13	Houston Rockets	34	48	.415	29
14	Minnesota Timberwolves	33	49	.402	30
15	Portland Trail Blazers	21	61	.256	42

== Player statistics ==
Legend
GP	Games played	GS	Games started	MPG	Minutes per game
FG%	Field-goal percentage	3P%	3-point field-goal percentage	FT%	Free-throw percentage
RPG	Rebounds per game	APG	Assists per game	SPG	Steals per game
BPG	Blocks per game	PPG	Points per game

=== Regular season ===
Player	GP	GS	MPG	FG%	3P%	FT%	RPG	APG	SPG	BPG	PPG
Derek Fisher	82	36	31.6	.410	.397	.833	2.6	4.3	1.5	.1	13.3
Mike Dunleavy Jr.	81	68	31.8	.406	.285	.778	4.9	2.9	.7	.4	11.5
Adonal Foyle	77	72	23.7	.507		.612	5.5	.4	.6	1.6	4.5
Jason Richardson	75	75	38.4	.446	.384	.673	5.8	3.1	1.3	.5	23.2
Troy Murphy	74	74	34.0	.433	.320	.787	10.0	1.4	.6	.4	14.0
Ike Diogu	69	14	14.9	.524		.810	3.3	.4	.2	.4	7.0
Andris Biedriņš	68	2	14.7	.638		.306	4.2	.4	.3	.7	3.8
Žarko Čabarkapa	61	0	8.3	.385	.250	.714	1.8	.3	.2	.1	3.3
Baron Davis	54	48	36.5	.389	.315	.675	4.4	8.9	1.6	.3	17.9
Mickaël Piétrus	52	18	22.7	.404	.318	.608	3.1	.8	.6	.2	9.3
Monta Ellis	49	3	18.1	.415	.341	.712	2.1	1.6	.7	.2	6.8
Calbert Cheaney	42	0	10.7	.389	.000	1.000	1.5	.5	.3	.0	2.2
Aaron Miles	19	0	6.2	.333		1.000	.7	1.3	.2	.1	.8
Chris Taft	17	0	8.5	.605		.167	2.1	.1	.1	.4	2.8
Will Bynum	15	0	10.8	.404	.222	.625	.8	1.3	.5	.0	3.6

== Transactions ==
=== Subtractions ===
Player	Reason left	New team
Rodney White	Waived	Bàsquet Manresa
Nikoloz Tskitishvili		Minnesota Timberwolves
Aaron Miles	Waived	Fort Worth Flyers
