= 2005–06 Sacramento Kings season =

NBA professional basketball team season

- Head coach: Rick Adelman
- President: Geoff Petrie
- General manager: Geoff Petrie
- Owners: Maloof family
- Arena: Arco Arena

Results
- Record: 44–38 (.537)
- Place: Division: 4th (Pacific); Conference: 8th (Western)
- Playoff finish: First Round (lost to Spurs 2–4)
- Stats at Basketball Reference

Local media
- Television: KXTV; CSN West
- Radio: KHTK

The 2005–06 Sacramento Kings season was the franchise's 57th season in the National Basketball Association (NBA) and the 21st in Sacramento, California. The team began the season looking to improve upon a 50–32 record from the previous season, but off-court problems meant they declined by six wins despite a late rush.

In the playoffs, the Kings lost to the San Antonio Spurs in six games in the First Round.

The Kings would not make the playoffs again until 2023, which was the longest active drought in the four major North American professional sports leagues at the time and the longest postseason drought in NBA history.

For the season, they added new gold road alternate uniforms with purple, grey and silver side panels to their jerseys and shorts, they remained in use until 2007.

== Offseason ==
=== NBA draft ===
Round	Pick	Player	Position	Nationality	School/Club team
1	23	Francisco García	Guard	Dominican Republic	Louisville

== Roster ==
Sacramento Kings roster
Players

Pos.	No.	Player	Height	Weight	DOB	From
PF	3	Shareef Abdur-Rahim	6 ft 9 in (2.06 m)	225 lb (102 kg)		California
SF	93	Ron Artest	6 ft 7 in (2.01 m)	244 lb (111 kg)		St. John's
PG	10	Mike Bibby	6 ft 2 in (1.88 m)	195 lb (88 kg)		Arizona
SG	32	Francisco García	6 ft 7 in (2.01 m)	195 lb (88 kg)		Louisville
PG	5	Jason Hart	6 ft 3 in (1.91 m)	180 lb (82 kg)		Syracuse
SF	23	Kevin Martin	6 ft 7 in (2.01 m)	185 lb (84 kg)		Western Carolina
C	52	Brad Miller	7 ft 0 in (2.13 m)	261 lb (118 kg)		Purdue
SG	15	Sergei Monia	6 ft 8 in (2.03 m)	220 lb (100 kg)		Russia
C	20	Vitaly Potapenko	6 ft 10 in (2.08 m)	280 lb (127 kg)		Wright State
PG	7	Ronnie Price	6 ft 2 in (1.88 m)	190 lb (86 kg)		Utah Valley
C	31	Jamal Sampson	6 ft 11 in (2.11 m)	257 lb (117 kg)		California
PF	9	Kenny Thomas	6 ft 7 in (2.01 m)	245 lb (111 kg)		New Mexico
SG	42	Bonzi Wells	6 ft 5 in (1.96 m)	210 lb (95 kg)		Ball State
PF	34	Corliss Williamson	6 ft 7 in (2.01 m)	245 lb (111 kg)		Arkansas

Coaches
Head coach
- Rick Adelman
Assistant(s)
- Bubba Burrage (Cal Poly)
- Pete Carril (Lafayette)
- T. R. Dunn (Alabama)
- Elston Turner (Mississippi)

Legend
- (DP) Unsigned draft pick
- (FA) Free agent
- (S) Suspended
- Injured

Roster

== Regular season ==
The 2005–06 season started off poorly, as the Kings had a hard time finding chemistry in the team. Newcomers Bonzi Wells and Shareef Abdur-Rahim made major contributions early in the season, but both fell victim to the injury bug and missed a significant number of games. As the Kings’ dismal start continued, the Maloofs decided to make a major move.

Popular sharpshooting small forward Peja Stojakovic was traded for Ron Artest, long known for his volatile temper. Artest guaranteed the Kings would make the playoffs. With Artest in the lineup, the Kings achieved a 20–9 record after the 2006 NBA All-Star Weekend, which was the second best post-All-Star break record that season. The Kings finished the regular season with a 44–38 record, which placed them fourth in the Pacific Division, only ahead of the Golden State Warriors. Their season ended with a defeat to the San Antonio Spurs in the first round 2–4. After the season, Rick Adelman was not retained.

Until the 2022–23 season, this marked the last season that the Kings made the playoffs, which was the longest active drought in the four major North American professional sports leagues and the longest postseason drought in NBA history. This was also the last time the Kings had a winning season until the 2022–23 season.

=== Standings ===
Pacific Division	W	L	PCT	GB	Home	Road	Div
y-Phoenix Suns	54	28	.659	-	31–10	23–18	10–6
x-Los Angeles Clippers	47	35	.573	7	27–14	20–21	7–9
x-Los Angeles Lakers	45	37	.549	9	27–14	18–23	9–7
x-Sacramento Kings	44	38	.537	10	27–14	17–24	10–6
Golden State Warriors	34	48	.415	20	21–20	13–28	4–12

#	Western Conference				
#	Team	W	L	PCT	GB
1	c-San Antonio Spurs	63	19	.768	-
2	y-Phoenix Suns	54	28	.659	9
3	y-Denver Nuggets	44	38	.537	19
4	x-Dallas Mavericks	60	22	.732	3
5	x-Memphis Grizzlies	49	33	.598	14
6	x-Los Angeles Clippers	47	35	.573	16
7	x-Los Angeles Lakers	45	37	.549	18
8	x-Sacramento Kings	44	38	.537	19
9	Utah Jazz	41	41	.500	22
10	New Orleans/Oklahoma City Hornets	38	44	.463	25
11	Seattle SuperSonics	35	47	.427	28
12	Golden State Warriors	34	48	.415	29
13	Houston Rockets	34	48	.415	29
14	Minnesota Timberwolves	33	49	.402	30
15	Portland Trail Blazers	21	61	.256	42

== Playoffs ==
2006 playoff game log
First Round: 2–4 (home: 2–1; road: 0–3)

Game	Date	Team	Score	High points	High rebounds	High assists	Location Attendance	Series
1	April 22	@ San Antonio	L 88–122	Mike Bibby (17)	Shareef Abdur-Rahim (9)	Ron Artest (4)	AT&T Center; 18,797	0–1
2	April 25	@ San Antonio	L 119–128 (OT)	Bonzi Wells (28)	Bonzi Wells (12)	Mike Bibby (6)	AT&T Center; 18,797	0–2
3	April 28	San Antonio	W 94–93	Mike Bibby (25)	Bonzi Wells (14)	Mike Bibby (8)	ARCO Arena; 17,317	1–2
4	April 30	San Antonio	W 102–84	Bonzi Wells (25)	Bonzi Wells (17)	Mike Bibby (7)	ARCO Arena; 17,317	2–2
5	May 2	@ San Antonio	L 98–109	Bonzi Wells (38)	Bonzi Wells (12)	three players tied (4)	AT&T Center; 18,797	2–3
6	May 5	San Antonio	L 83–105	Mike Bibby (19)	Bonzi Wells (11)	Ron Artest (4)	ARCO Arena; 17,317	2–4

2006 schedule

== Player statistics ==
Legend
GP	Games played	GS	Games started	MPG	Minutes per game
FG%	Field-goal percentage	3P%	3-point field-goal percentage	FT%	Free-throw percentage
RPG	Rebounds per game	APG	Assists per game	SPG	Steals per game
BPG	Blocks per game	PPG	Points per game

=== Regular season ===
Player	GP	GS	MPG	FG%	3P%	FT%	RPG	APG	SPG	BPG	PPG
Mike Bibby	82	82	38.6	.432	.386	.849	2.9	5.4	1.0	.1	21.1
Kenny Thomas	82	55	28.0	.505	.000	.676	7.5	2.0	.9	.5	9.1
Brad Miller	79	79	37.0	.495	.386	.828	7.8	4.7	.8	.8	15.0
Kevin Martin	72	41	26.6	.480	.369	.847	3.6	1.3	.8	.1	10.8
Shareef Abdur-Rahim	72	30	27.2	.525	.227	.784	5.0	2.1	.7	.6	12.3
Francisco García	67	11	19.4	.400	.285	.772	2.8	1.4	.6	.7	5.6
Jason Hart	66	0	12.4	.389	.290	.661	1.1	1.1	.5	.1	3.3
Bonzi Wells	52	41	32.4	.463	.222	.679	7.7	2.8	1.8	.5	13.6
Metta Sandiford-Artest^{†}	40	40	40.1	.383	.302	.717	5.2	4.2	2.0	.8	16.9
Brian Skinner^{†}	38	0	11.3	.551		.444	2.7	.4	.3	.5	2.3
Corliss Williamson	37	0	9.8	.417	1.000	.776	1.8	.4	.2	.1	3.4
Peja Stojaković^{†}	31	31	37.0	.403	.397	.933	5.3	2.2	.6	.1	16.5
Ronnie Price	29	0	5.2	.362	.222	1.000	.5	.4	.2	.0	2.1
Jamal Sampson	12	0	3.3	.714		.000	1.5	.4	.0	.3	.8
Vitaly Potapenko^{†}	9	0	3.6	.714			.2	.2	.0	.0	1.1
Sergei Monia^{†}	3	0	2.3	.000	.000	1.000	.3	.0	.3	.0	.7

=== Playoffs ===
Player	GP	GS	MPG	FG%	3P%	FT%	RPG	APG	SPG	BPG	PPG
Mike Bibby	6	6	42.5	.348	.346	.900	3.8	5.2	1.5	.0	16.7
Bonzi Wells	6	6	41.5	.609	.625	.651	12.0	1.3	.8	.3	23.2
Brad Miller	6	6	27.7	.404	.143	.923	3.0	2.5	1.2	.8	9.2
Kenny Thomas	6	6	24.7	.542		.692	4.5	1.3	.8	.0	5.8
Kevin Martin	6	1	32.8	.407	.316	1.000	5.0	.5	.5	.3	13.2
Shareef Abdur-Rahim	6	0	21.5	.535	.000	.600	4.8	1.2	.3	.0	9.2
Francisco García	6	0	6.8	.455	.250	1.000	.3	.2	.3	.3	2.2
Metta Sandiford-Artest	5	5	39.6	.383	.333	.696	5.0	3.0	1.6	.8	17.4
Jason Hart	5	0	10.4	.308		1.000	.4	.6	.6	.0	2.0
Vitaly Potapenko	4	0	2.3	.500			.3	.0	.3	.0	1.0
Ronnie Price	4	0	2.3	.000			.0	.3	.0	.0	.0
Corliss Williamson	3	0	3.7	.400		1.000	.3	.0	.0	.0	2.3

- ^{†} Denotes player spent time with another team in the season. Stats reflect time with the Kings only.
