= 2005–06 Utah Jazz season =

NBA professional basketball team season

- Head coach: Jerry Sloan
- Arena: EnergySolutions Arena

Results
- Record: 41–41 (.500)
- Place: Division: 2nd (Northwest); Conference: 9th (Western)
- Playoff finish: Did not qualify
- Stats at Basketball Reference

Local media
- Television: KJZZ-TV; FSN Utah
- Radio: KFNZ/KBEE

The 2005-06 Utah Jazz season was the team's 32nd in the NBA. They began the season hoping to improve upon their 26-56 output from the previous season. They managed to improve by 15 games, finishing 41-41, but failed to qualify for the playoffs for the third straight season.

On March 23, 2006, the Jazz' retired Karl Malone's jersey number 32 on his rafters reunited with his former teammate John Stockton, Frank Layden, his son Scott Layden, Jeff Hornacek, Mark Eaton, Antoine Carr, and head coach Jerry Sloan.

== Draft picks ==
| Round | Pick | Player | Position | Nationality | College |
|---|---|---|---|---|---|
| 1 | 3 | Deron Williams | PG | United States | Illinois |
| 2 | 34 | C.J. Miles | SF | United States | |
| 2 | 51 | Robert Whaley | C | United States | Walsh |

== Roster ==
Utah Jazz roster
Players

| Pos. | No. | Player | Height | Weight | DOB | From |
|---|---|---|---|---|---|---|
| PF | 5 | Carlos Boozer | 6 ft 9 in (2.06 m) | 258 lb (117 kg) | | Duke |
| SG | 23 | Devin Brown | 6 ft 5 in (1.96 m) | 210 lb (95 kg) | | Texas–San Antonio |
| PF | 31 | Jarron Collins | 6 ft 11 in (2.11 m) | 248 lb (112 kg) | | Stanford |
| SG | 10 | Gordan Giriček | 6 ft 7 in (2.01 m) | 225 lb (102 kg) | | Croatia |
| SF | 15 | Matt Harpring | 6 ft 7 in (2.01 m) | 230 lb (104 kg) | | Georgia Tech |
| C | 43 | Kris Humphries | 6 ft 9 in (2.06 m) | 235 lb (107 kg) | | Minnesota |
| SF | 47 | Andrei Kirilenko | 6 ft 9 in (2.06 m) | 235 lb (107 kg) | | Russia |
| PG | 25 | Keith McLeod | 6 ft 2 in (1.88 m) | 190 lb (86 kg) | | Bowling Green |
| SF | 34 | C. J. Miles | 6 ft 6 in (1.98 m) | 231 lb (105 kg) | | Skyline (HS) |
| C | 13 | Mehmet Okur | 6 ft 11 in (2.11 m) | 290 lb (132 kg) | | Turkey |
| C | 00 | Greg Ostertag | 7 ft 2 in (2.18 m) | 280 lb (127 kg) | | Kansas |
| SG | 30 | Andre Owens | 6 ft 4 in (1.93 m) | 200 lb (91 kg) | | Houston |
| PG | 3 | Milt Palacio | 6 ft 4 in (1.93 m) | 210 lb (95 kg) | | Colorado State |
| C | 54 | Robert Whaley | 6 ft 10 in (2.08 m) | 260 lb (118 kg) | | Walsh |
| PG | 8 | Deron Williams | 6 ft 3 in (1.91 m) | 210 lb (95 kg) | | Illinois |

Coaches
Head coach
- Jerry Sloan
Assistant(s)
- Tyrone Corbin (DePaul)
- Phil Johnson (Utah State)
- Scott Layden (Saint Francis (PA))
- Mark McKown (player development)

Legend
- (DP) Unsigned draft pick
- (FA) Free agent
- (S) Suspended
- Injured

Roster

== Regular season ==
=== Season standings ===
| Northwest Division | W | L | PCT | GB | Home | Road | Div |
|---|---|---|---|---|---|---|---|
| y-Denver Nuggets | 44 | 38 | .537 | - | 26–15 | 18–23 | 10–6 |
| Utah Jazz | 41 | 41 | .500 | 3 | 22–19 | 19–22 | 11–5 |
| Seattle SuperSonics | 35 | 47 | .427 | 9 | 22–19 | 13–28 | 10–6 |
| Minnesota Timberwolves | 33 | 49 | .402 | 11 | 24–17 | 9–32 | 6–10 |
| Portland Trail Blazers | 21 | 61 | .256 | 23 | 15–26 | 6–35 | 3–13 |

| # | Western Conference | | | | |
| # | Team | W | L | PCT | GB |
|---|---|---|---|---|---|
| 1 | c-San Antonio Spurs | 63 | 19 | .768 | - |
| 2 | y-Phoenix Suns | 54 | 28 | .659 | 9 |
| 3 | y-Denver Nuggets | 44 | 38 | .537 | 19 |
| 4 | x-Dallas Mavericks | 60 | 22 | .732 | 3 |
| 5 | x-Memphis Grizzlies | 49 | 33 | .598 | 14 |
| 6 | x-Los Angeles Clippers | 47 | 35 | .573 | 16 |
| 7 | x-Los Angeles Lakers | 45 | 37 | .549 | 18 |
| 8 | x-Sacramento Kings | 44 | 38 | .537 | 19 |
| 9 | Utah Jazz | 41 | 41 | .500 | 22 |
| 10 | New Orleans/Oklahoma City Hornets | 38 | 44 | .463 | 25 |
| 11 | Seattle SuperSonics | 35 | 47 | .427 | 28 |
| 12 | Golden State Warriors | 34 | 48 | .415 | 29 |
| 13 | Houston Rockets | 34 | 48 | .415 | 29 |
| 14 | Minnesota Timberwolves | 33 | 49 | .402 | 30 |
| 15 | Portland Trail Blazers | 21 | 61 | .256 | 42 |

== Player statistics ==
Legend
| GP | Games played | GS | Games started | MPG | Minutes per game |
| FG% | Field-goal percentage | 3P% | 3-point field-goal percentage | FT% | Free-throw percentage |
| RPG | Rebounds per game | APG | Assists per game | SPG | Steals per game |
| BPG | Blocks per game | PPG | Points per game |

=== Regular season ===
| Player | GP | GS | MPG | FG% | 3P% | FT% | RPG | APG | SPG | BPG | PPG |
|---|---|---|---|---|---|---|---|---|---|---|---|
| Mehmet Okur | 82 | 82 | 35.9 | .460 | .342 | .780 | 9.1 | 2.4 | .5 | .9 | 18.0 |
| Devin Brown | 81 | 14 | 21.1 | .393 | .331 | .745 | 2.6 | 1.3 | .5 | .2 | 7.5 |
| Deron Williams | 80 | 47 | 28.8 | .421 | .416 | .704 | 2.4 | 4.5 | .8 | .2 | 10.8 |
| Jarron Collins | 79 | 41 | 21.9 | .461 | | .717 | 4.2 | 1.2 | .5 | .3 | 5.3 |
| Matt Harpring | 71 | 32 | 27.4 | .475 | .359 | .725 | 5.2 | 1.4 | .8 | .2 | 12.5 |
| Milt Palacio | 71 | 18 | 19.4 | .424 | .063 | .653 | 1.9 | 2.7 | .7 | .2 | 6.2 |
| Andrei Kirilenko | 69 | 63 | 37.7 | .460 | .308 | .699 | 8.0 | 4.3 | 1.5 | 3.2 | 15.3 |
| Keith McLeod | 66 | 32 | 18.7 | .353 | .293 | .797 | 1.2 | 2.3 | .6 | .1 | 5.6 |
| Kris Humphries | 62 | 2 | 10.0 | .379 | .000 | .523 | 2.5 | .5 | .4 | .3 | 3.0 |
| Greg Ostertag | 60 | 22 | 13.5 | .492 | | .500 | 3.8 | 1.0 | .1 | 1.1 | 2.4 |
| Gordan Giriček | 37 | 36 | 25.8 | .433 | .305 | .754 | 1.9 | 1.7 | .4 | .1 | 10.6 |
| Carlos Boozer | 33 | 19 | 31.1 | .549 | | .723 | 8.6 | 2.7 | .9 | .2 | 16.3 |
| Andre Owens | 23 | 2 | 9.1 | .365 | .188 | .667 | .9 | .3 | .2 | .0 | 3.0 |
| Robert Whaley | 23 | 0 | 9.2 | .404 | | .500 | 1.9 | .7 | .3 | .3 | 2.1 |
| C. J. Miles | 23 | 0 | 8.8 | .368 | .250 | .750 | 1.7 | .7 | .3 | .1 | 3.4 |

== Awards and records ==
- Andrei Kirilenko, NBA All-Defensive First Team
- Deron Williams, NBA All-Rookie Team 1st Team
