= Ruben Patterson =

American basketball player (born 1975)

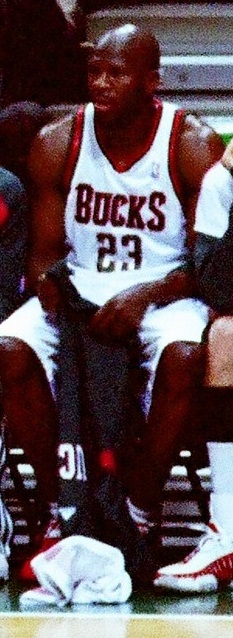
- Patterson with the Milwaukee Bucks in 2006

Personal information
- Born: July 31, 1975 (age 51) Cleveland, Ohio, U.S.
- Listed height: 6 ft 5 in (1.96 m)
- Listed weight: 223 lb (101 kg)

Career information
- High school: John Hay (Cleveland, Ohio)
- College: Independence CC (1994–1996); Cincinnati (1996–1998)
- NBA draft: 1998: 2nd round, 31st overall pick
- Drafted by: Los Angeles Lakers
- Playing career: 1998–2009
- Position: Small forward / shooting guard
- Number: 21, 22, 23, 13

Career history
- 1998: AEK Athens
- 1998–1999: Los Angeles Lakers
- 1999–2001: Seattle SuperSonics
- 2001–2006: Portland Trail Blazers
- 2006: Denver Nuggets
- 2006–2007: Milwaukee Bucks
- 2007: Los Angeles Clippers
- 2009: Champville

Career NBA statistics
- Points: 6,953 (10.7 ppg)
- Rebounds: 2,697 (4.2 rpg)
- Assists: 1,150 (1.8 apg)
- Stats at NBA.com
- Stats at Basketball Reference

Ruben Nathaniel Patterson (born July 31, 1975) is an American former professional basketball player. During his career, he played as a small forward and shooting guard. During his college career at the University of Cincinnati, Patterson helped lead the Bearcats to Conference USA titles in both of his seasons there. Drafted by the Los Angeles Lakers in 1998, Patterson began his career with the Greek team AEK Athens BC before joining the Lakers in his rookie season. Later, he played professionally in the National Basketball Association (NBA) for the Seattle SuperSonics, Portland Trail Blazers, Denver Nuggets, Milwaukee Bucks, and Los Angeles Clippers before ending his career with Champville SC in Lebanon.

== Early life ==
Patterson had a troubled family life, both parents and one of his sisters battled drug addiction, and his father spent time in prison. As a youth, he lived mostly with his mother, Charlene Patterson, who died of a heart attack when he was playing in college.

After hearing of her death while on a road trip against the UAB Blazers, he rejected an offer to fly home and spend time with his family, instead staying with his team for the game and scoring 32 points. "My mother would have wanted me to play," Patterson later explained.

Patterson started off his college basketball career at Independence Community College. He later transferred to the University of Cincinnati.

== Professional career ==
Patterson was a second-round selection of the 1998 NBA draft (31st pick overall), chosen by the Los Angeles Lakers. Due to the lock-out season of 1998, he started the season in the Greek league playing with AEK Athens BC where he averaged 12.6 points and 3.6 rebounds in 19 games. He later played for the Lakers, the Seattle SuperSonics, the Portland Trail Blazers, the Denver Nuggets, the Milwaukee Bucks, and the Los Angeles Clippers, averaging a career 10.7 points and 4.2 rebounds per game. He nicknamed himself the "Kobe Stopper" after claiming he could play strong defense against NBA superstar Kobe Bryant.

Patterson left the Lakers for Seattle on August 10, 1999, as a free agent. He quickly became known as a solid defensive player and a good shooter, finishing fourth in the league in field goal percentage. He finished his second season in Seattle after starting 74 of 81 games, and third on the team in scoring with 13.6 points per game. After that season, he signed with the Portland Trail Blazers.

In his second year in Portland, trouble began to brew for Patterson. In April 2003, he was punched in the face by teammate Zach Randolph during a practice that resulted in Patterson receiving a broken left eye socket. Randolph intervened in an argument between Patterson and rookie teammate Qyntel Woods. The move led to Randolph receiving a two-game suspension and a $100,000 fine. Often outspoken and erratic, Patterson was temporarily suspended from the Trail Blazers in the 2005–06 season for speaking harshly to coach Nate McMillan and refusing to return to a game, upset about his lack of playing time. Patterson later explained his outburst, saying he was frustrated and it was "like the devil hit me and told me to get it out". He also demanded that he get at least 25 minutes per game or be traded.

In February 2006, Patterson was traded to the Denver Nuggets. In the following off-season, he was traded to the Milwaukee Bucks for Joe Smith. In Milwaukee, Patterson posted the best numbers of his career with 14.7 points, 2.9 assists and 31.0 minutes per game. He also tied a career-high in rebounds per game with 5.4 and posted a career-best 55% field goal average.

On August 29, 2007, Patterson signed a contract with the Los Angeles Clippers. Patterson was waived by the Clippers on December 13, 2007. He later joined the Lebanese club Champville.

== Career statistics ==
Legend
GP	Games played	GS	Games started	MPG	Minutes per game
FG%	Field goal percentage	3P%	3-point field goal percentage	FT%	Free throw percentage
RPG	Rebounds per game	APG	Assists per game	SPG	Steals per game
BPG	Blocks per game	PPG	Points per game	**Bold**	Career high

=== NBA ===
==== Regular season ====
Year	Team	GP	GS	MPG	FG%	3P%	FT%	RPG	APG	SPG	BPG	PPG
1998–99	LA Lakers	24	2	6.0	.412	.167	**.710**	1.3	0.1	0.2	0.1	2.7
1999–00	Seattle	**81**	**74**	25.9	.536	**.444**	.692	**5.4**	1.6	1.2	0.5	11.6
2000–01	Seattle	76	22	27.1	.494	.056	.681	5.0	2.1	1.4	**0.6**	13.0
2001–02	Portland	75	13	23.5	.515	.250	.701	4.0	1.4	1.1	0.5	11.2
2002–03	Portland	78	17	21.2	.492	.150	.627	3.4	1.3	0.9	0.4	8.3
2003–04	Portland	73	1	22.6	.506	.167	.553	3.7	1.9	1.2	0.3	6.9
2004–05	Portland	70	36	28.0	.531	.080	.599	3.9	2.0	**1.5**	0.3	11.6
2005–06	Portland	45	2	23.5	.496	.000	.611	3.4	1.3	0.9	0.3	11.4
2005–06	Denver	26	20	28.3	.543	.167	.580	3.5	2.6	1.3	0.3	13.2
2006–07	Milwaukee	**81**	53	**31.0**	**.548**	.158	.641	**5.4**	**2.9**	1.4	0.3	**14.7**
2007–08	LA Clippers	20	5	16.4	.453	.000	.558	3.2	0.9	1.1	0.4	5.1
Career		649	245	24.6	.517	.179	.641	4.2	1.8	1.2	0.4	10.7

==== Playoffs ====
Year	Team	GP	GS	MPG	FG%	3P%	FT%	RPG	APG	SPG	BPG	PPG
1998–99	LA Lakers	3	0	1.7	.000	.000	.000	0.0	0.0	0.0	0.0	0.0
1999–00	Seattle	5	0	16.8	**.538**	.000	**.867**	3.0	0.4	0.6	**0.4**	8.2
2001–02	Portland	3	0	21.7	.333	.000	.750	2.3	0.3	**1.0**	0.3	5.3
2002–03	Portland	**7**	0	**22.1**	.481	.000	.690	**3.7**	**1.6**	0.6	0.1	**10.0**
2005–06	Denver	4	**1**	14.5	.529	.000	.400	1.5	0.8	0.3	0.0	5.0
Career		22	1	16.7	.477	.000	.719	2.5	0.8	0.5	0.2	6.7

=== College ===
Year	Team	GP	GS	MPG	FG%	3P%	FT%	RPG	APG	SPG	BPG	PPG
1996–97	Cincinnati	**31**	**26**	23.3	**.548**	**.282**	**.604**	5.6	1.4	1.1	0.3	13.7
1997–98	Cincinnati	19	14	**27.9**	.472	.269	.602	**6.3**	**2.2**	**1.2**	**0.6**	**16.5**
Career		50	40	25.1	.515	.274	.603	5.9	1.7	1.1	0.4	14.8

== Legal issues ==
Patterson was involved in a number of off-the-court issues during his basketball career. He would have to register himself as a sex offender to establish legal residency in many U.S. states, due to pleading guilty in 2001 to attempted rape of his child's nanny in September 2000. It was reported that he forced the nanny to perform a sex act on him. In February 2001, Patterson was convicted of misdemeanor assault for attacking a man who scratched his car outside a Cleveland, Ohio night club. Patterson was arrested in 2002 for felony domestic abuse charges on his wife. His wife later dropped the charges and they divorced.

He was accused of failing to register as a sex offender on May 15, 2007, after moving into a new house in Cincinnati and a bench warrant was issued. His agent, former NFL player Tim McGee, said Patterson's failure to register was "an oversight" after Patterson was ordered to pay a $1,000 fine on June 8.

In March 2010, Patterson was arrested in Hamilton County, Ohio on DUI charges after it was found that his blood alcohol level was .117. He was sentenced to a $500 fine and a three-day driving program, and was ordered not to consume alcohol for 18 months.

In 2019, Patterson pleaded guilty to charges of unpaid child support. While at one point he owed more than $100,000, he told The Cincinnati Enquirer that he is currently paying down this debt.
