= Brian Skinner =

American basketball player (born 1976)

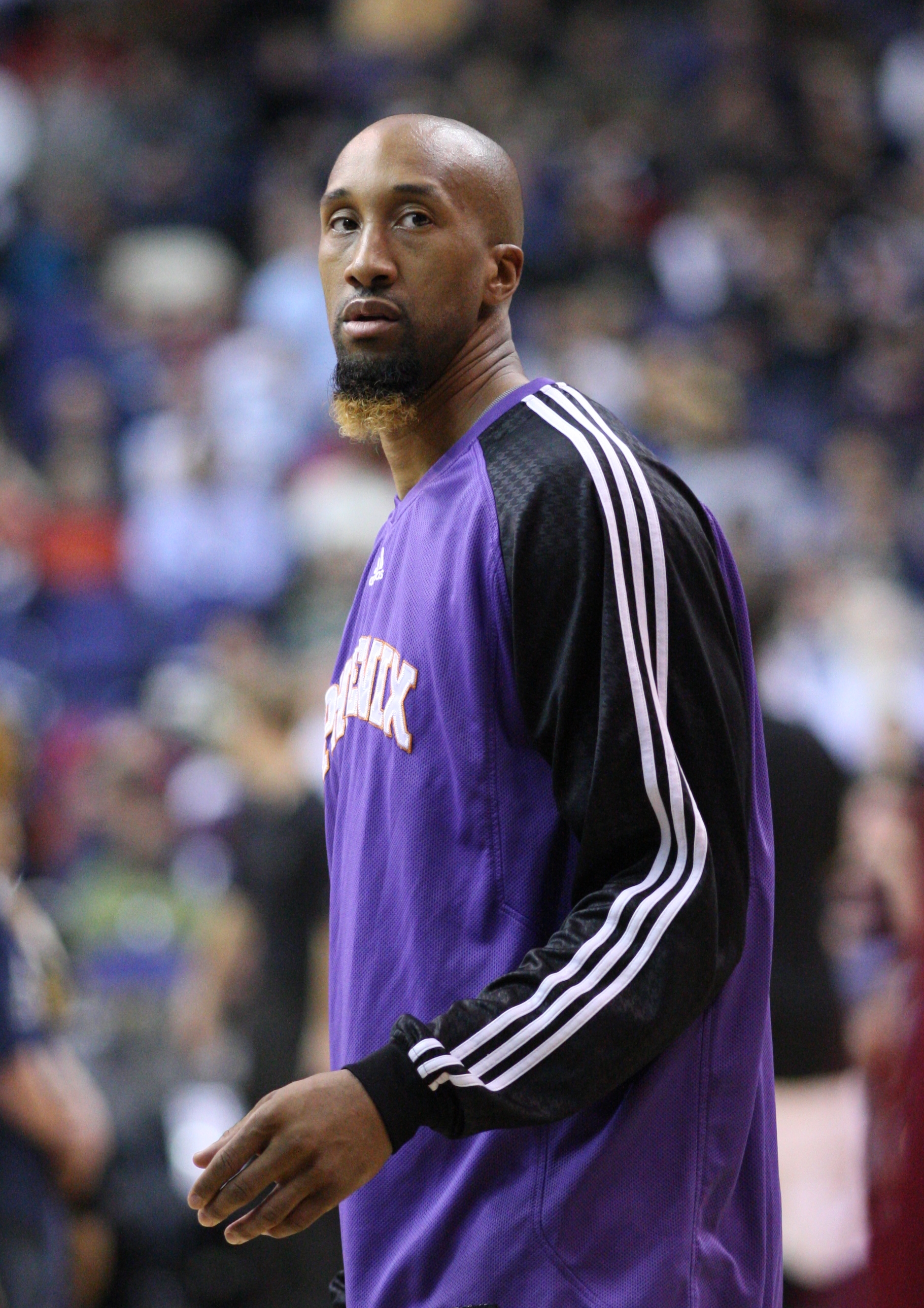
- Skinner with the Phoenix Suns in 2008

Personal information
- Born: May 19, 1976 (age 50) Temple, Texas, U.S.
- Listed height: 6 ft 9 in (2.06 m)
- Listed weight: 255 lb (116 kg)

Career information
- High school: Temple (Temple, Texas)
- College: Baylor (1994–1998)
- NBA draft: 1998: 1st round, 22nd overall pick
- Drafted by: Los Angeles Clippers
- Playing career: 1998–2011
- Position: Power forward / center
- Number: 32, 8, 54, 3

Career history
- 1998–2001: Los Angeles Clippers
- 2001–2002: Cleveland Cavaliers
- 2002–2003: Philadelphia 76ers
- 2003–2004: Milwaukee Bucks
- 2004–2005: Philadelphia 76ers
- 2005–2006: Sacramento Kings
- 2006: Portland Trail Blazers
- 2006–2007: Milwaukee Bucks
- 2007–2008: Phoenix Suns
- 2008–2010: Los Angeles Clippers
- 2010–2011: Milwaukee Bucks
- 2011: Benetton Treviso
- 2011: Memphis Grizzlies

Career highlights
- 2× Second-team All-Big 12 (1997, 1998)

Career NBA statistics
- Points: 2,876 (4.7 ppg)
- Rebounds: 2,841 (4.7 rpg)
- Blocks: 532 (0.9 bpg)
- Stats at NBA.com
- Stats at Basketball Reference
Medals
Men's basketball
Representing United States
Summer Universiade
| Gold medal – first place | 1997 Trapani | Team competition |

Brian Skinner (born May 19, 1976) is an American former professional basketball player. A 6'9", 255 lb power forward-center from Baylor University, Skinner was selected by the Los Angeles Clippers in the first round (22nd pick overall) of the 1998 NBA draft. He played for the Clippers, Cleveland Cavaliers, Philadelphia 76ers, Milwaukee Bucks, Sacramento Kings, Portland Trail Blazers, Phoenix Suns and Memphis Grizzlies in the NBA, as well as the Italian team Benetton Treviso.

== Professional career ==
Between his stints for the Clippers and the Cavaliers, he was traded to the Chicago Bulls and the Toronto Raptors but never played a game for either team. He was traded from the 76ers to Sacramento in the deal that sent Kings superstar Chris Webber to Philadelphia. During his stint in Sacramento during the 2004–05 season, he had one of his best career years with a 7.4 points per game average on a 55.4 percent shooting while also grabbing 8.7 rebounds per game. He also recorded a career high of 1.7 blocks per game during that season. In early 2006, he was traded to the Portland Trail Blazers, who then traded him in the 2006 off-season back to Milwaukee (along with Steve Blake and Ha Seung-Jin) for Jamaal Magloire. For the 2006–07 season, Skinner averaged 4.4 points and 5.7 rebounds in 22.7 minutes per game. Skinner and the Phoenix Suns reached an agreement on a one-year deal in September 2007. On July 31, 2008, Skinner signed with the Clippers, his former team, and re-signed with Los Angeles again the following season. In 2010, he joined the Bucks for the third time. He was released on January 5, 2011. In January 2011 he signed with Benetton Treviso in Italy. In 2011, Skinner made the Memphis Grizzlies' roster after training camp, but he was waived on December 29, 2011.

== Career statistics ==
Legend
| GP | Games played | GS | Games started | MPG | Minutes per game |
| FG% | Field goal percentage | 3P% | 3-point field goal percentage | FT% | Free throw percentage |
| RPG | Rebounds per game | APG | Assists per game | SPG | Steals per game |
| BPG | Blocks per game | PPG | Points per game | **Bold** | Career high |

=== NBA ===
==== Regular season ====
| Year | Team | GP | GS | MPG | FG% | 3P% | FT% | RPG | APG | SPG | BPG | PPG |
|---|---|---|---|---|---|---|---|---|---|---|---|---|
| 1998–99 | L.A. Clippers | 21 | 0 | 12.3 | .465 | – | .606 | 2.5 | .0 | .5 | .6 | 4.1 |
| 1999–00 | L.A. Clippers | 33 | 9 | 23.5 | .507 | – | .662 | 6.1 | .3 | .5 | 1.3 | 5.4 |
| 2000–01 | L.A. Clippers | 39 | 23 | 15.0 | .398 | – | .542 | 4.3 | .5 | .4 | .3 | 4.1 |
| 2001–02 | Cleveland | 65 | 8 | 17.0 | .543 | – | .608 | 4.3 | .3 | .4 | .9 | 3.4 |
| 2002–03 | Philadelphia | **77** | 9 | 17.9 | .550 | – | .602 | 4.8 | .2 | .6 | .7 | 6.0 |
| 2003–04 | Milwaukee | 56 | **54** | **28.2** | .497 | – | .572 | 7.3 | .9 | .5 | 1.1 | **10.5** |
| 2004–05 | Philadelphia | 24 | 0 | 10.3 | .386 | .000 | .294 | 2.6 | .2 | .2 | .2 | 2.0 |
| 2004–05 | Sacramento | 25 | 23 | 27.8 | **.554** | – | .377 | **8.7** | **1.5** | **1.0** | **1.7** | 7.4 |
| 2005–06 | Sacramento | 38 | 0 | 11.3 | .551 | – | .444 | 2.7 | .4 | .3 | .5 | 2.3 |
| 2005–06 | Portland | 27 | 5 | 19.1 | .484 | – | .517 | 4.7 | .5 | .5 | .9 | 3.8 |
| 2006–07 | Milwaukee | 67 | 44 | 22.7 | .490 | – | .582 | 5.7 | .9 | .3 | 1.0 | 4.4 |
| 2007–08 | Phoenix | 66 | 0 | 12.8 | .465 | **.667** | .524 | 3.6 | .2 | .3 | 1.2 | 3.3 |
| 2008–09 | L.A. Clippers | 51 | 21 | 16.5 | .449 | .000 | .638 | 4.0 | .5 | .3 | 1.0 | 4.2 |
| 2009–10 | L.A. Clippers | 16 | 1 | 7.7 | .400 | – | **.750** | 1.7 | .0 | .2 | .2 | 1.6 |
| 2010–11 | Milwaukee | 2 | 0 | 3.0 | – | – | – | .0 | .0 | .0 | .0 | .0 |
| 2011–12 | Memphis | 1 | 0 | 4.0 | .000 | – | – | .0 | .0 | .0 | .0 | .0 |
| Career | | 608 | 197 | 17.9 | .494 | .333 | .566 | 4.7 | .5 | .4 | .9 | 4.7 |

==== Playoffs ====
| Year | Team | GP | GS | MPG | FG% | 3P% | FT% | RPG | APG | SPG | BPG | PPG |
|---|---|---|---|---|---|---|---|---|---|---|---|---|
| 2003 | Philadelphia | **8** | 0 | 4.8 | .167 | .000 | **1.000** | .8 | .0 | .0 | .1 | .8 |
| 2004 | Milwaukee | 5 | **3** | **18.8** | **.524** | – | .417 | **4.4** | .0 | .2 | .6 | **5.4** |
| 2005 | Sacramento | 4 | 1 | 11.8 | .500 | – | – | 2.8 | **.5** | **.5** | **1.0** | 2.0 |
| 2008 | Phoenix | 4 | 0 | 5.3 | .500 | – | .500 | .8 | .0 | .0 | .8 | 2.0 |
| Career | | 21 | 4 | 9.5 | .462 | .000 | .542 | 2.0 | .1 | .1 | .5 | 2.3 |

== Personal life ==
Skinner has two daughters who have won collegiate national championships in volleyball: Avery (NCAA champion at Kentucky in 2020) and Madisen (NCAA champion at Kentucky in 2020 and twice at Texas in 2022 and 2023). Avery Skinner also hit outside at the 2024 Paris Olympics and is an Olympic Silver Medalist.
