= 2005–06 Denver Nuggets season =

NBA professional basketball team season

- Division champions
- Head coach: George Karl
- Owners: Stan Kroenke
- Arena: Pepsi Center

Results
- Record: 44–38 (.537)
- Place: Division: 1st (Northwest); Conference: 3rd (Western)
- Playoff finish: First Round (lost to Clippers 1–4)

Local media
- Television: Altitude Sports and Entertainment
- Radio: KCKK

The 2005–06 Denver Nuggets season was the team's 40th in the NBA. They began the season hoping to improve upon their 49-33 output from the previous season. However, they came five games shy of tying it, finishing 44–38, but qualified for the playoffs for the third straight season. However, the Nuggets would be eliminated by the Los Angeles Clippers in the First Round in five games. In spite of regressing from last year's 49–33, the Nuggets won the division due to the presence of mediocrity.

For this season, they added new dark blue road alternate uniforms with light blue side panels to their jerseys and shorts, they remained in used until 2012.

== Draft picks ==
Round	Pick	Player	Position	Nationality	School/Club team
1	20	Julius Hodge	SF/SG	United States	North Carolina State
1	22	Jarrett Jack	PG	United States	Georgia Tech
2	52	Axel Hervelle	SF/PF	Belgium	

== Roster ==
2005–06 Denver Nuggets roster
Players

Pos.	No.	Player	Height	Weight	DOB	From
SG	15	Carmelo Anthony	6 ft 8 in (2.03 m)	240 lb (109 kg)		Syracuse
PG	11	Earl Boykins	5 ft 5 in (1.65 m)	133 lb (60 kg)		Eastern Michigan
SG	7	Greg Buckner	6 ft 4 in (1.93 m)	210 lb (95 kg)		Clemson
PF	23	Marcus Camby	6 ft 11 in (2.11 m)	240 lb (109 kg)		UMass
PG	10	Howard Eisley	6 ft 2 in (1.88 m)	185 lb (84 kg)		Boston College
C	56	Francisco Elson	7 ft 0 in (2.13 m)	235 lb (107 kg)		California
PF	30	Reggie Evans	6 ft 7 in (2.01 m)	245 lb (111 kg)		Iowa
SG	32	Julius Hodge	6 ft 7 in (2.01 m)	210 lb (95 kg)		NC State
SF	3	DerMarr Johnson	6 ft 9 in (2.06 m)	210 lb (95 kg)		Cincinnati
SF	43	Linas Kleiza	6 ft 8 in (2.03 m)	235 lb (107 kg)		Missouri
SF	6	Kenyon Martin	6 ft 9 in (2.06 m)	225 lb (102 kg)		Cincinnati
PG	24	Andre Miller	6 ft 2 in (1.88 m)	200 lb (91 kg)		Utah
PF	21	Eduardo Nájera	6 ft 8 in (2.03 m)	235 lb (107 kg)		Oklahoma
C	31	Nenê (injured)	6 ft 11 in (2.11 m)	250 lb (113 kg)		Brazil
SF	22	Ruben Patterson	6 ft 5 in (1.96 m)	223 lb (101 kg)		Cincinnati

Coaches
Head coach
- George Karl
Assistant(s)
- Scott Brooks (UC Irvine)
- Adrian Dantley (Notre Dame)
- Tim Grgurich (Pittsburgh)
- Doug Moe (North Carolina)
- Jamahl Mosley (player development)
- John Welch (player development)
- Bill Branch (director of scouting)

Legend
- (DP) Unsigned draft pick
- (FA) Free agent
- (S) Suspended
- Injured

Roster

=== Roster notes ===
- Guard Julius Hodge also holds citizenship in the U.S. Virgin Islands.

== Regular season ==
=== Season standings ===
Northwest Division	W	L	PCT	GB	Home	Road	Div
y-Denver Nuggets	44	38	.537	-	26–15	18–23	10–6
Utah Jazz	41	41	.500	3	22–19	19–22	11–5
Seattle SuperSonics	35	47	.427	9	22–19	13–28	10–6
Minnesota Timberwolves	33	49	.402	11	24–17	9–32	6–10
Portland Trail Blazers	21	61	.256	23	15–26	6–35	3–13

#	Western Conference				
#	Team	W	L	PCT	GB
1	c-San Antonio Spurs	63	19	.768	-
2	y-Phoenix Suns	54	28	.659	9
3	y-Denver Nuggets	44	38	.537	19
4	x-Dallas Mavericks	60	22	.732	3
5	x-Memphis Grizzlies	49	33	.598	14
6	x-Los Angeles Clippers	47	35	.573	16
7	x-Los Angeles Lakers	45	37	.549	18
8	x-Sacramento Kings	44	38	.537	19
9	Utah Jazz	41	41	.500	22
10	New Orleans/Oklahoma City Hornets	38	44	.463	25
11	Seattle SuperSonics	35	47	.427	28
12	Golden State Warriors	34	48	.415	29
13	Houston Rockets	34	48	.415	29
14	Minnesota Timberwolves	33	49	.402	30
15	Portland Trail Blazers	21	61	.256	42

== Playoffs ==
2006 playoff game log
First Round: 1–4 (home: 1–1; road: 0–3)

Game	Date	Team	Score	High points	High rebounds	High assists	Location Attendance	Series
1	April 22	L.A. Clippers	L 87–89	Anthony, Miller (25)	Marcus Camby (10)	Andre Miller (6)	Staples Center; 19,162	0–1
2	April 24	L.A. Clippers	L 87–98	Anthony, Camby (16)	Marcus Camby (14)	Andre Miller (6)	Staples Center; 18,794	0–2
3	April 27	@ L.A. Clippers	W 94–87	Carmelo Anthony (24)	Marcus Camby (14)	Andre Miller (7)	Pepsi Center; 19,099	1–2
4	April 29	@ L.A. Clippers	L 86–100	Carmelo Anthony (17)	Carmelo Anthony (11)	Andre Miller (9)	Pepsi Center; 19,099	1–3
5	May 1	L.A. Clippers	L 83–101	Carmelo Anthony (23)	Marcus Camby (11)	Andre Miller (8)	Staples Center; 18,648	1–4

2006 schedule

== Player statistics ==
Legend
GP	Games played	GS	Games started	MPG	Minutes per game
FG%	Field-goal percentage	3P%	3-point field-goal percentage	FT%	Free-throw percentage
RPG	Rebounds per game	APG	Assists per game	SPG	Steals per game
BPG	Blocks per game	PPG	Points per game

=== Regular season ===
Player	GP	GS	MPG	FG%	3FG%	FT%	RPG	APG	SPG	BPG	PPG
Carmelo Anthony	80	80	36.8	.481	.243	.808	4.9	2.7	1.1	0.5	26.5
Andre Miller	82	82	35.8	.463	.185	.738	4.3	8.2	1.3	0.2	13.7
Ruben Patterson	26	20	28.3	.543	.167	.580	3.5	2.6	1.3	0.3	13.2
Kenyon Martin	56	49	27.6	.495	.227	.712	6.3	1.4	0.8	0.9	12.9
Marcus Camby	56	54	33.2	.465	.091	.712	11.9	2.1	1.4	3.3	12.8
Earl Boykins	60	0	25.7	.410	.346	.874	1.4	3.8	0.8	0.1	12.6
Voshon Lenard	12	6	19.8	.408	.286	.385	2.3	1.5	0.7	0.2	8.3
Earl Watson	46	10	21.2	.429	.395	.627	1.9	3.5	0.8	0.2	7.5
Greg Buckner	73	27	24.1	.434	.354	.782	2.9	1.7	1.2	0.3	6.7
DerMarr Johnson	58	21	15.9	.431	.350	.810	1.7	0.9	0.4	0.4	6.1
Eduardo Nàjera	64	3	22.6	.422	.333	.781	5.1	0.8	0.8	0.5	5.4
Reggie Evans	26	2	23.3	.453		.505	8.7	0.6	0.6	0.2	5.2
Francisco Elson	72	54	21.9	.532	.200	.662	4.7	0.7	0.8	0.6	4.9
Howard Eisley	19	0	14.8	.349	.316	.833	1.0	2.3	0.4	0.1	4.8
Linas Kleiza	61	2	8.5	.445	.154	.704	1.9	0.2	0.2	0.2	3.5
Julius Hodge	14	0	2.4	.385		.375	0.5	0.4	0.1	0.0	0.9
Nenê	1	0	3.0	.000			0.0	0.0	0.0	0.0	0.0
Bryon Russell	1	0	3.0				1.0	1.0	0.0	0.0	0.0
Charles Smith	1	0	2.0	.000	.000		0.0	0.0	0.0	0.0	0.0

=== Playoffs ===
Player	GP	GS	MPG	FG%	3FG%	FT%	RPG	APG	SPG	BPG	PPG
Carmelo Anthony	5	5	38.6	.333	.000	.750	6.6	2.8	0.8	0.2	21.0
Andre Miller	5	5	36.4	.442		.824	4.4	7.2	1.0	0.2	16.4
Greg Buckner	5	4	27.4	.418	.313	.875	2.8	1.2	0.6	0.2	12.6
Marcus Camby	5	5	35.0	.419		.556	11.0	2.2	0.8	2.8	11.4
Earl Boykins	5	0	28.0	.322	.211	.765	1.4	4.0	0.8	0.0	11.0
Ruben Patterson	4	1	14.5	.529		.400	1.5	0.8	0.3	0.0	5.0
Kenyon Martin	2	0	17.5	.308		.500	4.5	0.5	2.0	1.0	4.5
Reggie Evans	5	0	13.8	.429	.000	.722	4.6	0.0	0.4	0.2	3.8
DerMarr Johnson	3	0	11.3	.231	.100		3.3	0.7	0.0	0.3	2.3
Eduardo Nàjera	4	3	22.3	.214		.500	3.8	0.5	0.8	0.0	2.0
Linas Kleiza	3	0	4.7	.375	.000		1.3	0.7	0.0	0.0	2.0
Francisco Elson	5	2	15.0	.600			2.2	0.4	0.8	0.0	1.2

Player statistics citation:

== Awards and records ==
- Carmelo Anthony, All-NBA Third Team
- Marcus Camby, NBA All-Defensive Second Team
