= 2005–06 Memphis Grizzlies season =

- Head coach: Mike Fratello
- President: Jerry West
- General manager: Jerry West
- Owner: Michael Heisley
- Arena: FedExForum

Results
- Record: 49–33 (.598)
- Place: Division: 3rd (Southwest); Conference: 5th (Western)
- Playoff finish: First Round (lost to Mavericks 0–4)
- Stats at Basketball Reference

Local media
- Television: WMC-TV; WPXX-TV; FSN South
- Radio: WREC

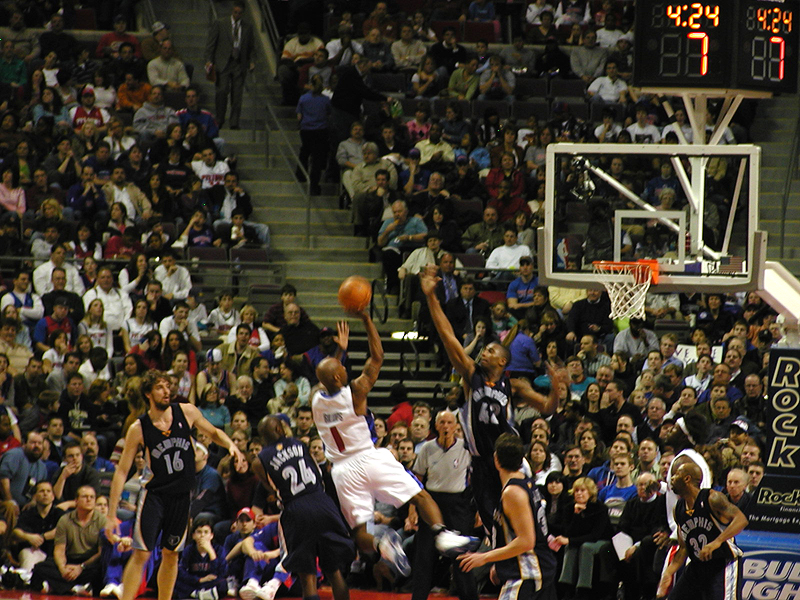
Chauncey Billups of the Detroit Pistons attempts a shot over Lorenzen Wright of the Memphis Grizzlies.

The 2005-06 Memphis Grizzlies season was the team's 11th in the NBA. They began the season hoping to improve upon their 45-37 output from the previous season. They bested it by four games, finishing 49–33, and qualified for the playoffs for the third straight season.

== Draft picks ==
Round	Pick	Player	Position	Nationality	College
1	19	Hakim Warrick	PF	United States	Syracuse

== Roster ==
2005–06 Memphis Grizzlies roster
Players

Pos.	No.	Player	Height	Weight	DOB	From
PG	32	Chucky Atkins	5 ft 11 in (1.80 m)	185 lb (84 kg)	1974-08-14	South Florida
SF	31	Shane Battier	6 ft 8 in (2.03 m)	220 lb (100 kg)	1978-09-09	Duke
PG	1	Antonio Burks	6 ft 1 in (1.85 m)	200 lb (91 kg)	1980-02-25	Memphis
PF	35	Brian Cardinal	6 ft 8 in (2.03 m)	245 lb (111 kg)	1977-05-02	Purdue
PF	16	Pau Gasol	7 ft 0 in (2.13 m)	250 lb (113 kg)	1980-07-06	Spain
PG	24	Bobby Jackson	6 ft 1 in (1.85 m)	185 lb (84 kg)	1973-03-13	Minnesota
SF	30	Dahntay Jones	6 ft 6 in (1.98 m)	225 lb (102 kg)	1980-12-27	Duke
SG	6	Eddie Jones	6 ft 6 in (1.98 m)	200 lb (91 kg)	1971-10-20	Temple
SG	33	Mike Miller	6 ft 8 in (2.03 m)	218 lb (99 kg)	1980-02-19	Florida
PG	3	Anthony Roberson	6 ft 2 in (1.88 m)	180 lb (82 kg)	1983-02-14	Florida
C	44	Lawrence Roberts	6 ft 9 in (2.06 m)	240 lb (109 kg)	1982-10-20	Mississippi State
PG	20	Damon Stoudamire (injured)	5 ft 10 in (1.78 m)	171 lb (78 kg)	1973-09-03	Arizona
C	12	Jake Tsakalidis	7 ft 2 in (2.18 m)	285 lb (129 kg)	1979-06-10	Republic of Georgia
PF	21	Hakim Warrick	6 ft 9 in (2.06 m)	219 lb (99 kg)	1982-07-08	Syracuse
C	42	Lorenzen Wright	6 ft 11 in (2.11 m)	255 lb (116 kg)	1975-11-04	Memphis

Coaches
Head coach
- Mike Fratello
Assistant(s)
- Mitchell Anderson
- Lionel Hollins
- Eric Musselman

Legend
- (DP) Unsigned draft pick
- (FA) Free agent
- (S) Suspended
- Injured

Roster
Updated: April 17, 2006

== Regular season ==
=== Season standings ===
Southwest Division	W	L	PCT	GB	Home	Road	Div
y-San Antonio Spurs	63	19	.768	-	34–7	29–12	13–3
x-Dallas Mavericks	60	22	.732	3	34–7	26–15	13–3
x-Memphis Grizzlies	49	33	.598	14	30–11	19–22	6–10
New Orleans/Oklahoma City Hornets	38	44	.463	25	24–17	14–27	7–9
Houston Rockets	34	48	.415	29	15–26	19–22	1–15

#	Western Conference				
#	Team	W	L	PCT	GB
1	c-San Antonio Spurs	63	19	.768	-
2	y-Phoenix Suns	54	28	.659	9
3	y-Denver Nuggets	44	38	.537	19
4	x-Dallas Mavericks	60	22	.732	3
5	x-Memphis Grizzlies	49	33	.598	14
6	x-Los Angeles Clippers	47	35	.573	16
7	x-Los Angeles Lakers	45	37	.549	18
8	x-Sacramento Kings	44	38	.537	19
9	Utah Jazz	41	41	.500	22
10	New Orleans/Oklahoma City Hornets	38	44	.463	25
11	Seattle SuperSonics	35	47	.427	28
12	Golden State Warriors	34	48	.415	29
13	Houston Rockets	34	48	.415	29
14	Minnesota Timberwolves	33	49	.402	30
15	Portland Trail Blazers	21	61	.256	42

== Playoffs ==
2006 playoff game log
First Round: 0–4 (home: 0–2; road: 0–2)

Game	Date	Team	Score	High points	High rebounds	High assists	Location Attendance	Series
1	April 23	@ Dallas	L 93–103	Pau Gasol (24)	Jake Tsakalidis (8)	Gasol, Jackson (4)	American Airlines Center; 20,340	0–1
2	April 26	@ Dallas	L 79–94	Pau Gasol (16)	Pau Gasol (7)	Pau Gasol (5)	American Airlines Center; 20,612	0–2
3	April 29	Dallas	L 89–94 (OT)	Chucky Atkins (20)	Lorenzen Wright (10)	Eddie Jones (5)	FedExForum; 17,871	0–3
4	May 1	Dallas	L 76–102	Pau Gasol (25)	Shane Battier (7)	Chucky Atkins (4)	FedExForum; 15,104	0–4

2006 schedule

== Player statistics ==
=== Regular season ===
Player	POS	GP	GS	MP	REB	AST	STL	BLK	PTS	MPG	RPG	APG	SPG	BPG	PPG
Shane Battier	SF	81	81	2,839	429	136	92	114	818	35.0	5.3	1.7	1.1	1.4	10.1
Pau Gasol	PF	80	80	3,135	713	371	46	153	1,628	39.2	8.9	4.6	.6	1.9	20.4
Lorenzen Wright	C	78	58	1,689	395	48	52	46	454	21.7	5.1	.6	.7	.6	5.8
Eddie Jones	SG	75	75	2,437	279	177	131	27	885	32.5	3.7	2.4	1.7	.4	11.8
Mike Miller	SG	74	9	2,268	397	200	52	27	1,014	30.6	5.4	2.7	.7	.4	13.7
Bobby Jackson	PG	71	15	1,775	223	195	61	1	808	25.0	3.1	2.7	.9	.0	11.4
Dahntay Jones	SF	71	4	967	104	39	38	15	281	13.6	1.5	.5	.5	.2	4.0
Hakim Warrick	PF	68	2	724	144	30	14	21	278	10.6	2.1	.4	.2	.3	4.1
Antonio Burks	PG	57	1	570	37	76	20	0	113	10.0	.6	1.3	.4	.0	2.0
Jake Tsakalidis	C	51	19	732	212	13	14	32	257	14.4	4.2	.3	.3	.6	5.0
Chucky Atkins^{†}	PG	43	39	1,161	75	129	29	2	491	27.0	1.7	3.0	.7	.0	11.4
Brian Cardinal	PF	36	0	402	55	33	23	0	124	11.2	1.5	.9	.6	.0	3.4
Lawrence Roberts	C	33	0	181	49	5	8	2	51	5.5	1.5	.2	.2	.1	1.5
Damon Stoudamire	PG	27	27	862	95	128	19	1	317	31.9	3.5	4.7	.7	.0	11.7
Anthony Roberson	PG	16	0	88	6	5	1	0	35	5.5	.4	.3	.1	.0	2.2
John Thomas^{†}	C	3	0	25	0	1	0	1	4	8.3	.0	.3	.0	.3	1.3

=== Playoffs ===
Player	POS	GP	GS	MP	REB	AST	STL	BLK	PTS	MPG	RPG	APG	SPG	BPG	PPG
Pau Gasol	PF	4	4	158	27	12	2	5	81	39.5	6.8	3.0	.5	1.3	20.3
Shane Battier	SF	4	4	129	23	2	4	2	24	32.3	5.8	.5	1.0	.5	6.0
Chucky Atkins	PG	4	4	103	3	12	2	0	39	25.8	.8	3.0	.5	.0	9.8
Eddie Jones	SG	4	3	119	11	10	3	1	41	29.8	2.8	2.5	.8	.3	10.3
Jake Tsakalidis	C	4	3	59	11	2	1	1	13	14.8	2.8	.5	.3	.3	3.3
Mike Miller	SG	4	1	107	15	7	2	2	34	26.8	3.8	1.8	.5	.5	8.5
Bobby Jackson	PG	4	0	100	8	5	1	0	33	25.0	2.0	1.3	.3	.0	8.3
Lorenzen Wright	C	4	0	86	20	3	0	4	29	21.5	5.0	.8	.0	1.0	7.3
Dahntay Jones	SF	4	0	46	7	0	1	0	17	11.5	1.8	.0	.3	.0	4.3
Hakim Warrick	PF	3	1	43	7	0	1	0	20	14.3	2.3	.0	.3	.0	6.7
Brian Cardinal	PF	3	0	22	4	1	1	0	3	7.3	1.3	.3	.3	.0	1.0
Antonio Burks	PG	2	0	13	1	2	1	0	3	6.5	.5	1.0	.5	.0	1.5

- ^{†} Denotes player spent time with another team in the season. Stats reflect time with the Grizzlies only.

== Awards and records ==
- Mike Miller, NBA Sixth Man of the Year Award
- Pau Gasol, NBA All-Star Game
