= Marc Jackson =

American basketball player (born 1975)

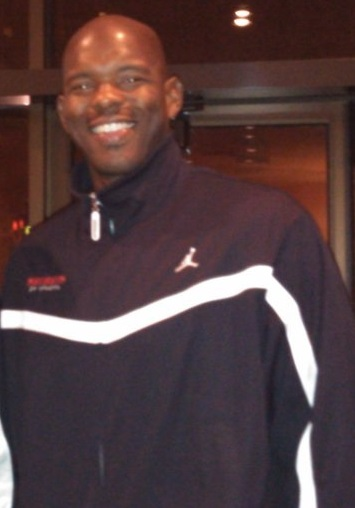

Personal information
- Born: January 16, 1975 (age 51) Philadelphia, Pennsylvania, U.S.
- Listed height: 6 ft 10 in (2.08 m)
- Listed weight: 270 lb (122 kg)

Career information
- High school: Roman Catholic (Philadelphia, Pennsylvania)
- College: VCU (1993–1994); Temple (1995–1997)
- NBA draft: 1997: 2nd round, 37th overall pick
- Drafted by: Golden State Warriors
- Playing career: 1997–2010
- Position: Center / power forward
- Number: 44, 25

Career history
- 1997–1998: Tofaş Bursa
- 1998–1999: Lobos Caja Cantabria
- 1999: Efes Pilsen
- 1999–2000: Cantabria Lobos
- 2000–2002: Golden State Warriors
- 2002–2003: Minnesota Timberwolves
- 2003–2005: Philadelphia 76ers
- 2005–2006: New Jersey Nets
- 2006–2007: New Orleans/Oklahoma City Hornets
- 2007–2008: Olympiacos
- 2008–2009: UNICS Kazan
- 2009–2010: Xacobeo Blu:sens

Career highlights
- NBA All-Rookie First Team (2001); Atlantic 10 Player of the Year (1997)

Career NBA statistics
- Points: 3,238 (8.4 ppg)
- Rebounds: 1,655 (4.3 rpg)
- Assists: 311 (0.8 apg)
- Stats at NBA.com
- Stats at Basketball Reference

Marc Anthony Jackson (born January 16, 1975) is an American former professional basketball player who played seven seasons in the National Basketball Association (NBA) from 2000 to 2007. He is a current television analyst of the Philadelphia 76ers for NBC Sports Philadelphia.

== Early life and college ==
Jackson grew up in North Philadelphia and attended Roman Catholic High School. He averaged 18 points, 11 rebounds and two blocks while leading his team to the Catholic League championship in 1993, as well as winning the Alhambra Catholic Invitational Tournament. During the ACIT, he was commanding presence in the middle during Roman Catholic's run, including their defeat of perennial powerhouse DeMatha in the final. His performance earned him an All-Tournament Team nod, in spite of missing a dunk during the semi-final game that drew massive gasps, and then laughs, from the packed crowd. He committed to Virginia Commonwealth University where he played for one year. Prior to his sophomore year, Jackson transferred to Temple University, which was only five blocks from his childhood home in Philadelphia. He would redshirt his first year of eligibility, then play two seasons for the Owls. Jackson led the team in scoring and rebounding both seasons, helping them to a 40–14 record over those years and advanced to the NCAA tournament both seasons. He gave up his fifth and final year of eligibility to declare for the NBA draft.

== Professional career ==
Jackson was drafted in the second round (37th overall) of the 1997 NBA draft by the Golden State Warriors. Because he fell to the second round, Jackson chose to begin his pro career in Europe to make more money to support his mother and younger brother and better develop his skills before entering the NBA. He spent three years overseas playing for Tofaş Bursa (Turkey), Lobos Caja Cantabria (Spain) and Cantabria Lobos (Spain), before returning to U.S. and debuting for the Warriors in 2000.

Jackson made an immediate impact for the Warriors, leading all rookies in points and rebounds, while staying near the top of the list in field goal and free throw percentages. He was named to the All-Rookie team and finished third in Rookie of the Year voting. As a restricted free agent at the end of the season, Jackson signed a six-year, $24.375 million offer sheet with the Houston Rockets, which the Warriors matched. Despite Jackson's success, he was stuck behind Adonal Foyle, Danny Fortson and Erick Dampier on Golden State's depth chart, and voiced his displeasure with the Warriors front office matching the offer, rather than allowing him to get more playing time elsewhere.

At the 2002 NBA trade deadline, the Warriors traded Jackson to the Minnesota Timberwolves, to play alongside Kevin Garnett. On July 23, 2003, he was traded to his hometown Philadelphia 76ers in a four-team deal. He missed 57 games due to injury his first season in Philadelphia, but bounced back the next year leading the team in rebounds and being second in points, to help the Sixers return to the playoffs. During his time in Philadelphia, he split time between the Center and Power Forward positions.

On August 9, 2005, Jackson was traded to the New Jersey Nets after a deal to bring in Shareef Abdur-Rahim from the Portland Trail Blazers to the Nets fell through. Before the 2005–06 trade deadline, he was traded by the Nets to the New Orleans Hornets, along with Linton Johnson in exchange for Boštjan Nachbar. In 2007, he signed with the Greek League team Olympiacos, but was released after not fitting in the system of the team's new coach, Panagiotis Giannakis. In August, 2008, Jackson was signed by UNICS Kazan of the Russian Super League, and he announced his retirement shortly after signing for Obradoiro CAB in 2009.

== Post-playing career ==
Jackson now works as 76ers basketball analyst for NBC Sports Philadelphia.
