= Kelvin Torbert =

American basketball player (born 1983)

Personal information
- Born: May 24, 1983 (age 43) Flint, Michigan, US
- Listed height: 6 ft 4 in (1.93 m)
- Listed weight: 224 lb (102 kg)

Career information
- High school: Northwestern (Flint, Michigan)
- College: Michigan State (2001–2005)
- NBA draft: 2005: undrafted
- Playing career: 2005–2012
- Position: Shooting guard / small forward

Career history
- 2005–2006: JL Bourg
- 2006–2007: Euphony Bree
- 2007–2008: Paris-Levallois
- 2008–2010: Dexia Mons-Hainaut
- 2010: Iraklis Thessaloniki
- 2010–2011: Ural Yekaterinburg
- 2011: Toros de Nuevo Laredo
- 2011–2012: Okapi Aalstar
- 2012: Ratiopharm Ulm

Career highlights
- Third-team All-Big 10 – Media (2004); Gatorade National Player of the Year (2001); Mr. Basketball of Michigan (2001); McDonald's All-American (2001); USA Today All-USA First Team (2001); First-team Parade All-American (2001); Third-team Parade All-American (2000)

Kelvin Deion Torbert Sr. (born May 24, 1983) is an American former professional basketball player.

== High school career ==
Torbert was born in Flint, Michigan to Climmie Torbert and Florine Green. His mother died of breast cancer when Torbert was 5 years old; his father, an Opelika, Alabama native, was employed at General Motors and also had developed health issues, specifically to his kidneys; he died in 2005.

After attending Holmes Middle School, Torbert enrolled at Northwestern High School in Flint in 1997 and during his 4-year career he became the best player of the varsity team, gaining state recognition starting from his sophomore year. He was considered an all-around player, capable of scoring in the post, the midrange and on dunks and 3-point shots. Torbert became a starter for the team in his freshman year, and averaged 15.5 points per game; he improved to 18 points in his sophomore year. He started to be nationally ranked during his junior year in 2000, and he was selected in the Parade All-American Third Team after averaging 25.1 points, 10.5 rebounds and 5.1 assists per game.

His senior year at Northwestern was very successful. He was ranked among the top 5 players in the nation by the major recruiting services, and he was considered the top shooting guard of the class of 2001. He averaged 26 points, 8.2 rebounds, 3.5 assists and 2.5 steals in his final year of high school basketball, ending his career with 1,978 points, that placed him second in Flint city history behind Charlie Bell. He played a total of 95 games at Northwestern and finished his high school career with 4 All-City and All-Valley nominations, he was 3 times Associated Press All-State First team and once All-State honorable mention, and won 3 city championships under coach Grover Kirkland. His convincing performance at Northwestern earned him many awards and All-American selections: he was named the Gatorade National Basketball Player of the Year, Sporting News Player of the Year and Mr. Basketball of Michigan, he was part of the USA Today All-America First team, and he was selected as a First team Parade All-American and as a McDonald's All-American. In the 2001 McDonald's All-American Boys Game he scored 21 points shooting 50% from the field (6 for 12) and went 8 for 11 from the free throw line. He was the second top scorer of the West team, tied with David Lee and behind Eddy Curry (28 points).

== College career ==
Torbert was recruited since his junior year in high school, and received interest from Cincinnati, Connecticut, Michigan and Michigan State. Torbert committed to play for Michigan State, for which he had signed a letter of intent. He chose not to declare his eligibility for the 2001 NBA draft despite several of the top ranked players of the 2001 class doing so. He was considered one of the best recruits to commit to Michigan State in several years. Under coach Tom Izzo, Torbert was immediately considered a starter, and he started 26 of the 31 games played in his freshman season. He was given significant playing time, averaging 25.1 minutes, and ended the season with averages of 8.2 points, 3.4 rebounds and 1.5 assists. He started his first game at MSU on November 12, 2001, against Detroit and recorded a then career-high 18 points on January 16, 2002, against Purdue. He was named the Best Defensive Player of his team together with Alan Anderson.

In October 2002 he underwent ankle surgery and missed the preseason games, and during the season-opening game against UNC Asheville on November 22 he did not start. His sophomore season saw him getting increased playing time and he became a regular starter (34 out of 35 games), and he averaged 8.7 points and 3.8 rebounds. He recorded a new career high scoring 22 points on February 15, 2003, against Northwestern, and contributed to reach the Elite Eight during the 2003 NCAA Division I men's basketball tournament: the Spartans were defeated by Texas in the South Regional finals. At the end of the season he was named Michigan State Most Improved Player and Best Defensive Player.

Before the 2003–04 season started, Torbert worked on his shooting, and his percentages increased significantly: he shot 53% from the field and 48% from 3-point range on 2.1 attempts per game, and his scoring average reached a career high of 10.7 points per game. He ranked in the top ten of the Big Ten Conference in all the shooting categories, and he led the conference in 3-point field goal percentage. His performance during his junior year earned him All-Big 10 honors: he was selected as an Honorable Mention by the coaches and in the Third team by the media. He started 26 out of 30 games, and recorded a season-best 21 points against Coppin State on December 30, 2003; he was also second on the team in rebounding average, and third in assists. At the end of the season he received the team Most Improved Player award, and his third consecutive Best Defensive Player award, sharing it with Maurice Ager.

Torbert's senior year at Michigan State saw him losing his spot in the starting five, and he took the role of sixth man, being the first option off the bench. He played 33 games but only started 2, and he had the lowest minutes per game average of his career with 22.6. His overall stats declined and he averaged 9.5 points and 2.9 rebounds on .509 shooting (.345 from three). Torbert was considered a very good defender during his senior year, and he scored a total of 1,195 points for the Spartans during his 4-year career in college basketball.

=== College statistics ===
Year	Team	GP	GS	MPG	FG%	3P%	FT%	RPG	APG	SPG	BPG	PPG
2001–02	Michigan State	31	26	25.1	.399	.316	.806	3.4	1.5	0.5	0.1	8.2
2002–03	Michigan State	35	34	29.3	.420	.323	.747	3.8	1.7	0.6	0.3	8.7
2003–04	Michigan State	30	26	28.8	.534	.484	.800	3.6	2.0	0.8	0.2	10.7
2004–05	Michigan State	33	2	22.6	.509	.345	.827	2.9	1.5	0.7	0.4	9.5
Career		129	88	26.5	.462	.373	.792	3.4	1.7	0.6	0.3	9.3

== Professional career ==
After the end of his senior year of college Torbert was automatically eligible for the 2005 NBA draft, but he was not selected by an NBA team. He played for the Toronto Raptors during the 2005 Minnesota NBA Summer League. He then signed for French team JL Bourg, where he played 34 games, averaging 12.1 points, 3.1 rebounds and 2.5 assists during the LNB Pro A regular season. His team also participated in the playoffs, where they were defeated by Le Mans Sarthe in 3 games: Torbert averaged 7.0 points, 4.0 rebounds and 2.0 assists in the series. For the 2006–07 season he signed for Belgian club Euphony Bree, where he had a successful stint: he scored 15.9 points per game, and contributed to bring his team to the playoffs, where he played 7 games and averaged a career-high 21.3 points.

After that he went back to France, this time signing for Paris-Levallois, but he had limited playing time and despite appearing in 30 regular season games, he only averaged 7.0 points. After the 2007–08 season he transferred in Belgium again, joining Mons-Hainaut where he played 2 seasons. He then played in Greece for Iraklis, but ended the season in Russia, playing 31 games in the second level for Ural Yekaterinburg scoring 12.5 points per game. After a brief stint in Mexico, where he played 3 games with Toros de Nuevo Laredo, he again signed with a Belgian team, Okapi Aalstar, but he only played 2 games there.

Torbert then moved to Germany: after a 1-month trial at BBC Bayreuth, after which he was released, he signed with Ratiopharm Ulm where he had 4 appearances, averaging 4 points per game.

== Personal life ==
He has a son named Kelvin Jr., who is currently committed to Bowling Green University & was the winner of the 2026 Mr. Basketball of Michigan.
