= 2005–06 Los Angeles Clippers season =

NBA professional basketball team season

- Head coach: Mike Dunleavy Sr.
- General manager: Elgin Baylor
- Owner: Donald Sterling
- Arena: Staples Center

Results
- Record: 47–35 (.573)
- Place: Division: 2nd (Pacific); Conference: 6th (Western)
- Playoff finish: Conference Semifinals (lost to Suns 3–4)
- Stats at Basketball Reference

Local media
- Television: KTLA; FSN West 2/Prime Ticket
- Radio: KSPN

The 2005–06 Los Angeles Clippers season was their 36th season in the NBA and their 22nd in Los Angeles. The Clippers finished with 47 wins and 35 losses in the regular season for their first winning season since 1991-92. their best record since the 1974–75 season when they were the Buffalo Braves and made the playoffs for the first time since 1997 as the 6th seed, finishing with a better record than their crosstown rival, the Los Angeles Lakers, who finished two games behind them with a 45–37 record as the 7th seed, for the first time since 1992.

In the playoffs, the Clippers defeated the 3rd seeded Denver Nuggets in the First Round in five games, marking the first time they won a series since moving to California in 1978. The Clippers then advanced to the Semi-finals, where they lost in seven games to the Phoenix Suns. The Suns previously defeated the Clippers' Staples Center co-tenants, the Los Angeles Lakers, in seven games in the First Round after being down 1–3 in the series.

The Clippers would not return to the playoffs until 2012.

== Draft picks ==
Round	Pick	Player	Position	Nationality	College
1	12	Yaroslav Korolev	F	Russia	CSKA Moscow (Russia)
2	32	Daniel Ewing	PG	United States	Duke

== Roster ==
2005–06 Los Angeles Clippers roster
Players

Pos.	No.	Player	Height	Weight	DOB	From
C	34	Vin Baker	6 ft 11 in (2.11 m)	240 lb (109 kg)	1971-11-23	Hartford
PF	42	Elton Brand	6 ft 9 in (2.06 m)	254 lb (115 kg)	1979-03-11	Duke
PG	19	Sam Cassell	6 ft 3 in (1.91 m)	185 lb (84 kg)	1969-11-18	Florida State
SG	3	Daniel Ewing	6 ft 3 in (1.91 m)	185 lb (84 kg)	1983-03-26	Duke
C	35	Chris Kaman	7 ft 0 in (2.13 m)	265 lb (120 kg)	1982-04-28	Central Michigan
SF	8	Yaroslav Korolev	6 ft 9 in (2.06 m)	203 lb (92 kg)	1987-05-07	Russia
PG	14	Shaun Livingston	6 ft 7 in (2.01 m)	182 lb (83 kg)	1985-09-11	Peoria Central HS (IL)
SF	50	Corey Maggette	6 ft 6 in (1.98 m)	225 lb (102 kg)	1979-11-12	Duke
SF	0	Walter McCarty	6 ft 10 in (2.08 m)	230 lb (104 kg)	1974-02-01	Kentucky
SG	5	Cuttino Mobley	6 ft 4 in (1.93 m)	215 lb (98 kg)	1975-09-01	Rhode Island
C	22	Boniface Ndong	7 ft 0 in (2.13 m)	255 lb (116 kg)	1977-03-09	Senegal
PF	7	Vladimir Radmanovic	6 ft 10 in (2.08 m)	234 lb (106 kg)	1980-11-19	Serbia & Montenegro
C	11	Zeljko Rebraca	7 ft 0 in (2.13 m)	265 lb (120 kg)	1972-04-09	Serbia & Montenegro
SF	13	Quinton Ross	6 ft 6 in (1.98 m)	193 lb (88 kg)	1981-04-30	SMU
SF	15	James Singleton	6 ft 8 in (2.03 m)	220 lb (100 kg)	1981-07-20	Murray State

Coaches
Head coach
- Mike Dunleavy Sr.
Assistant(s)
- Jim Eyen
- Neal Meyer
- Rory White
- Kim Hughes
- Jasen Powell (trainer)

Legend
- (DP) Unsigned draft pick
- (FA) Free agent
- (S) Suspended
- (DL) On assignment to D-League affiliate
- Injured

Roster
Updated: February 20, 2006

== Regular season ==
=== Season standings ===
Pacific Division	W	L	PCT	GB	Home	Road	Div
y-Phoenix Suns	54	28	.659	-	31–10	23–18	10–6
x-Los Angeles Clippers	47	35	.573	7	27–14	20–21	7–9
x-Los Angeles Lakers	45	37	.549	9	27–14	18–23	9–7
x-Sacramento Kings	44	38	.537	10	27–14	17–24	10–6
Golden State Warriors	34	48	.415	20	21–20	13–28	4–12

#	Western Conference				
#	Team	W	L	PCT	GB
1	c-San Antonio Spurs	63	19	.768	-
2	y-Phoenix Suns	54	28	.659	9
3	y-Denver Nuggets	44	38	.537	19
4	x-Dallas Mavericks	60	22	.732	3
5	x-Memphis Grizzlies	49	33	.598	14
6	x-Los Angeles Clippers	47	35	.573	16
7	x-Los Angeles Lakers	45	37	.549	18
8	x-Sacramento Kings	44	38	.537	19
9	Utah Jazz	41	41	.500	22
10	New Orleans/Oklahoma City Hornets	38	44	.463	25
11	Seattle SuperSonics	35	47	.427	28
12	Golden State Warriors	34	48	.415	29
13	Houston Rockets	34	48	.415	29
14	Minnesota Timberwolves	33	49	.402	30
15	Portland Trail Blazers	21	61	.256	42

== Playoffs ==
2006 playoff game log
First Round: 4–1 (home: 3–0; road: 1–1)

Game	Date	Team	Score	High points	High rebounds	High assists	Location Attendance	Series
1	April 22	Denver	W 89–87	Elton Brand (21)	Chris Kaman (13)	Sam Cassell (7)	Staples Center; 19,162	1–0
2	April 24	Denver	W 98–87	Cuttino Mobley (21)	Elton Brand (11)	Sam Cassell (11)	Staples Center; 18,794	2–0
3	April 27	@ Denver	L 87–94	Corey Maggette (23)	Brand, Livingston (8)	Brand, Livingston (4)	Pepsi Center; 19,099	2–1
4	April 29	@ Denver	W 100–86	Corey Maggette (19)	Elton Brand (10)	Shaun Livingston (6)	Pepsi Center; 19,099	3–1
5	May 1	Denver	W 101–83	Maggette, Mobley (23)	Elton Brand (13)	Shaun Livingston (14)	Staples Center; 18,648	4–1

Conference Semifinals: 3–4 (home: 2–1; road: 1–3)

Game	Date	Team	Score	High points	High rebounds	High assists	Location Attendance	Series
1	May 8	@ Phoenix	L 123–130	Elton Brand (40)	Elton Brand (9)	Shaun Livingston (9)	US Airways Center; 18,422	0–1
2	May 10	@ Phoenix	W 122–97	Elton Brand (27)	Chris Kaman (16)	Sam Cassell (6)	US Airways Center; 18,422	1–1
3	May 12	Phoenix	L 91–94	Elton Brand (20)	Corey Maggette (14)	Elton Brand (8)	Staples Center; 19,877	1–2
4	May 14	Phoenix	W 114–107	Elton Brand (30)	Corey Maggette (15)	Sam Cassell (9)	Staples Center; 19,897	2–2
5	May 16	@ Phoenix	L 118–125 (2OT)	Elton Brand (33)	Elton Brand (15)	Brand, Cassell (5)	US Airways Center; 18,422	2–3
6	May 18	Phoenix	W 118–106	Elton Brand (30)	Elton Brand (13)	Sam Cassell (8)	Staples Center; 19,985	3–3
7	May 22	@ Phoenix	L 107–127	Elton Brand (36)	Brand, Maggette (9)	Sam Cassell (6)	US Airways Center; 18,422	3–4

2006 schedule

== Player statistics ==
Legend
GP	Games played	GS	Games started	MPG	Minutes per game
FG%	Field-goal percentage	3P%	3-point field-goal percentage	FT%	Free-throw percentage
RPG	Rebounds per game	APG	Assists per game	SPG	Steals per game
BPG	Blocks per game	PPG	Points per game

=== Season ===
Player	GP	GS	MPG	FG%	3P%	FT%	RPG	APG	SPG	BPG	PPG
Elton Brand	79	79	39.2	.527	.333	.775	10.0	2.6	1.0	2.5	24.7
Cuttino Mobley	79	74	37.7	.426	.339	.839	4.3	3.0	1.2	.5	14.8
Chris Kaman	78	78	32.8	.523	.000	.770	9.6	1.0	.6	1.4	11.9
Sam Cassell	78	75	34.0	.443	.368	.863	3.7	6.3	.9	.1	17.2
Quinton Ross	67	45	22.6	.422	.000	.760	2.5	1.2	.8	.2	4.7
Daniel Ewing	66	5	14.7	.380	.282	.783	1.3	1.3	.6	.1	3.8
Shaun Livingston	61	14	25.0	.427	.125	.688	3.0	4.5	.8	.5	5.8
James Singleton	59	10	12.8	.510	.500	.780	3.3	.5	.3	.4	3.4
Chris Wilcox^{†}	48	1	13.7	.536	.000	.644	3.6	.4	.3	.4	4.5
Walter McCarty	36	1	9.8	.333	.222	.571	1.9	.6	.2	.1	2.4
Corey Maggette	32	13	29.5	.445	.338	.828	5.3	2.1	.6	.1	17.8
Vladimir Radmanović^{†}	30	11	29.5	.417	.418	.731	5.7	2.1	1.0	.5	10.7
Željko Rebrača	29	2	14.2	.542		.756	2.2	.3	.2	.7	4.7
Yaroslav Korolev	24	0	5.3	.300	.286	.700	.5	.4	.1	.0	1.1
Boniface N'Dong	23	1	6.6	.415	.000	.667	1.6	.3	.1	.2	2.2
Howard Eisley^{†}	13	0	8.6	.235	.250		1.1	1.9	.2	.0	.7
Vin Baker	8	1	10.6	.467		.722	2.4	.5	.5	.5	3.4
Anthony Goldwire	3	0	7.3	.143	.000		.3	.7	.0	.0	.7

=== Playoffs ===
Player	GP	GS	MPG	FG%	3P%	FT%	RPG	APG	SPG	BPG	PPG
Elton Brand	12	12	43.1	.551	.000	.750	10.3	4.0	.9	2.6	25.4
Cuttino Mobley	12	12	39.4	.427	.367	.897	4.8	2.0	.7	.3	13.3
Sam Cassell	12	12	33.7	.437	.349	.809	4.0	5.8	.7	.2	18.0
Quinton Ross	12	10	24.5	.534		.875	2.7	.8	.6	.7	7.7
Corey Maggette	12	2	24.3	.467	.333	.910	7.3	1.4	.6	.4	15.3
Vladimir Radmanović	12	2	20.5	.470	.463	.696	4.0	1.1	.6	.5	8.1
Shaun Livingston	12	0	27.7	.474	1.000	.810	4.7	4.8	.6	.5	7.5
Chris Kaman	11	10	29.5	.593		.762	8.0	.9	.5	.8	10.7
Walter McCarty	8	0	1.3	.250	.000		.1	.0	.0	.0	.3
James Singleton	7	0	1.7	.333	.000		.4	.3	.0	.0	.3
Daniel Ewing	6	0	0.8	1.000			.0	.0	.0	.0	.3
Željko Rebrača	3	0	7.3	.333			1.3	.0	.0	.3	.7

- ^{†} Denotes player spent time with another team in the season. Stats reflect time with the Clippers only.

== Awards, records and milestones ==
=== Awards ===
- general manager Elgin Baylor won the NBA Executive of the Year.
- Forward Elton Brand won the NBA Sportsmanship Award.

==== All-Star ====
- Elton Brand selected as a reserve forward for the Western Conference All-Stars. This is his second All-Star Game appearance.

== Injuries and surgeries ==
Player	Injury Date	Injury Type
Kaniel Dickens	January 11, 2006	Sprained right ankle

== Transactions ==
The Clippers have been involved in the following transactions during the 2005–06 season.

=== Trades ===
August 12, 2005
February 14, 2006
To Los Angeles Clippers

- Sam Cassell
To Los Angeles Clippers

- Vladimir Radmanovic
To Minnesota Timberwolves

- Lionel Chalmers & Marko Jaric
To Seattle SuperSonics

- Chris Wilcox

=== Free agents ===
==== Additions ====
Player	Signed	Former team
Cuttino Mobley	August 3	Sacramento Kings
James Singleton	August 30	Armani Jeans Milano (Lega Basket Serie A)
Walter McCarty	September 29	Phoenix Suns
Anthony Goldwire	October 23	Milwaukee Bucks
Boniface N'Dong	October 23	TSK uniVersa Bamberg (BBL)
Howard Eisley	November 17	Utah Jazz
Kaniel Dickens	January 10	Dallas Mavericks
Vin Baker	February 20	Houston Rockets

==== Subtractions ====
Player	Left	New team
Mamadou N'Diaye	waived, June 29	Golden State Warriors
Rick Brunson	waived, August 3	Seattle SuperSonics
Kerry Kittles	waived, August 3	New Jersey Nets (part-time scout)
Bobby Simmons	free agency, August 8	Milwaukee Bucks
Mikki Moore	waived, August 31	Seattle SuperSonics
Darrick Martin	free agency, November 16	Toronto Raptors
Anthony Goldwire	waived, November 16	Panellinios B.C. (GBL)
Howard Eisley	waived, January 3	Denver Nuggets
Kaniel Dickens	contract expired, January 20	Atlanta Hawks

== See also ==
- 2005–06 NBA season
