= Flint Central High School =

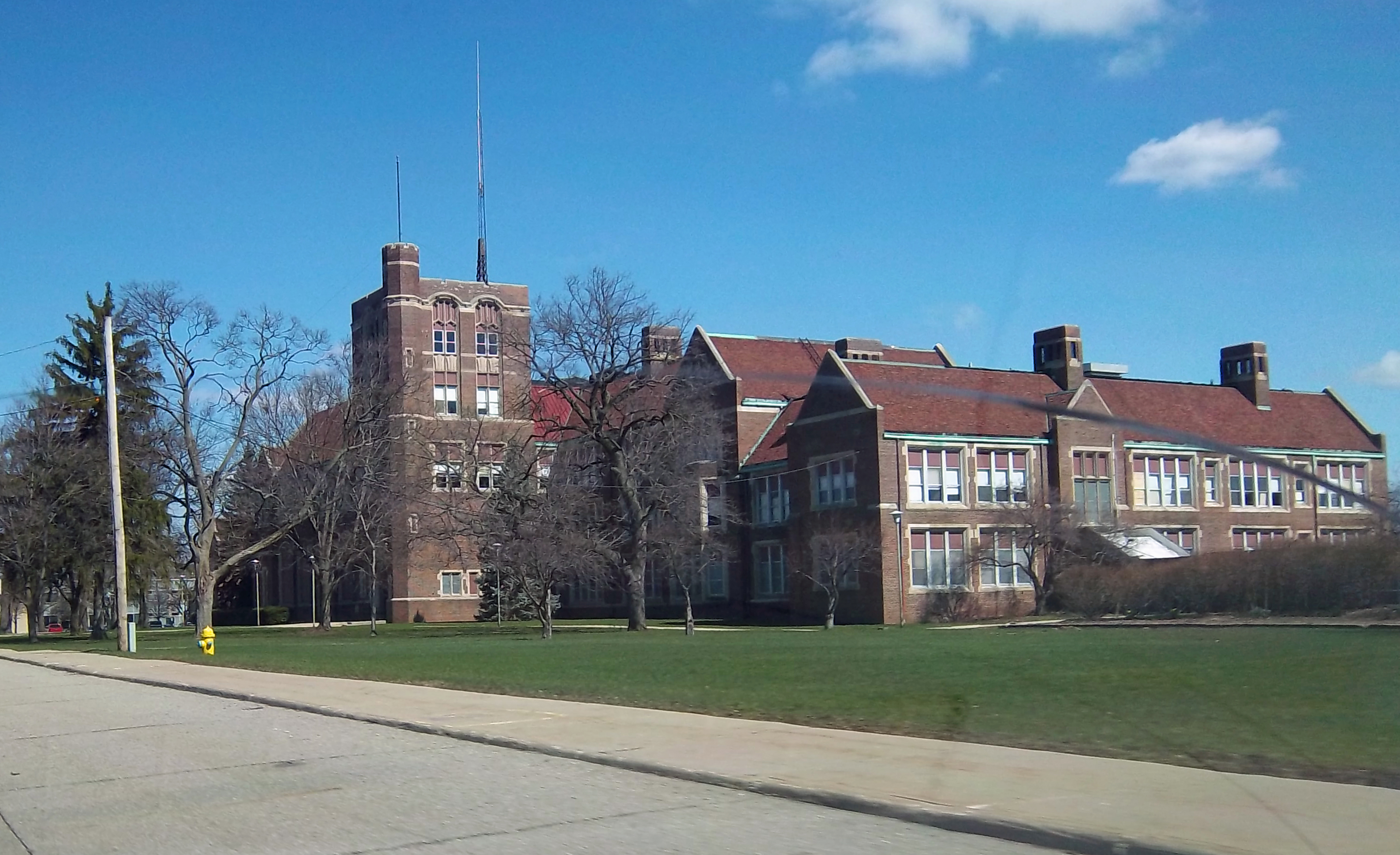

Location
- 601 Crapo St. Flint, Michigan; USA; 43.0203°N 83.6783°W

Information
- Type: Public secondary
- Established: 1923
- Closed: 2010
- School district: Flint Community Schools
- Principal: Janice Davis
- Grades: 7th–12th
- Enrollment: 1450
- Campus size: 43 acres (170,000 m^{2})
- Colors: Red and black
- Athletics conference: Saginaw Valley League
- Mascot: Phoenix (current); Indians (former)
- Affiliation: Flint Community Schools
- Website: central.flintschools.org

Flint Central High School was one of the Flint Community Schools, located in Flint, Michigan, United States. Flint Central was the city's oldest school. Its first building was built in 1875 before moving to 601 Crapo Street in 1923, which previously was the grounds for the Oak Grove Hospital, which closed in 1920. Although it was the original Flint High School, it was referred to as Flint Central before Flint Northern High School was built in around 1928. Approximately 2,000 students attended the school at its peak attendance, and about half that at the time of its closing. Graduation ceremonies were held at Whiting Auditorium. The school building is located in the East Village, near the corner of Crapo Street and Court Street.

== History ==
The first high school was built in Flint in 1875 at the northwest corner of Third Street and Saginaw Street. Overcrowding of the Flint High School led to a search for a new site that could accommodate a growing population. In 1919 the Oak Grove Hospital offered up their grounds for sale to the Union School District as the site to build the high school upon. The site was considered ideal due to its location, reasonable cost, and space enough for buildings, parking and outdoor space for athletic fields and gardens. The first principal of the new high school was C.V. Courter.

In 1977 Central opened a newly built field house on the campus, connecting the school to the field house via a covered walkway. The building was named for Napoleon J. LaVoie, who served as the school's first athletic director from 1934 to 1968.

In April 2009 the Board of Education voted to close the school due to declining enrollment and maintenance costs. As Central High School is one of the oldest buildings in the district, it was cited as costly to maintain and renovate. Several other schools in the district were closed as well, all of which were elementary schools.

The last day of classes at Flint Central High School was on June 11, 2009. The following day, a farewell ceremony was held at the school for alumni to walk the halls one last time. The building closed indefinitely, which was met with great backlash from the current students, parents and alumni. At the time of the closure, the Flint Schools put out a statement saying that Central could re-open in five years with several renovations. That, however, was deemed untrue as the Flint Schools could not afford to re-open Central, and due to declining enrollment district-wide, the FCS also closed Flint Northern High School in 2013.

City planners have drafted long-term plans to consolidate Flint's high schools into a new high school at the existing Flint Central location.

== Athletics ==
Flint Central competed in the oldest athletic conference in the State of Michigan, the Saginaw Valley League. The football teams played their home games at Atwood Stadium in Flint. On certain nights when Atwood was already in use (also the home of Flint Northern and Flint Southwestern), Flint Central would host at their secondary home, Guy V. Houston Stadium, located near Flint Northwestern.

- Men's basketball
- Baseball
- Bowling
- Men's swimming
- Women's volleyball
- Men's wrestling
- Women's basketball
- Cross country
- Men's football
- Women's golf
- Men's golf
- Women's Soccer
- Men's Soccer
- Women's Softball
- Women's Swimming
- Tennis
- Track and field
- Cheerleading

=== Athletic history ===
From 1976 through 2001 the school's football coach was Joe Eufinger. His lifetime record was 138–102, which is the ninth-highest win total amongst coaches in Genesee County. Longtime Baseball coach Bob Holec is now leading the Flint Baseball Commission and is the Commissioner of the baseball contingent for the CANUSA Games. The Men's Basketball team was coached for many years by Stan Gooch. They won state championships in 1981, 1982 and 1983. He won over 500 games and is in numerous Halls of Fame. The softball team was led by Cuban refugee Margarita Calvo to an unprecedented 22 consecutive City League titles. The Flint Central tennis team won their first City Championship in more than seven years in spring of 2007, and still maintained their position until the school was closed. Clem Rowe was the longtime Tennis Coach at the school. After years of struggling, the baseball team rebounded with a 15-win season in 2007, claiming the city series title, as well as runner up in the annual Greater Flint Tournament.

=== Mascot change ===
The mascot of Flint Central High School since 1928 was the Indian. In 2001 the Flint Board of Education voted to phase out school mascots that made reference to Native Americans in all of Flint's schools. This affected other school mascots as well including the Pierce Elementary School Arrows (although the mascot name is a reference to the automobile model, not the weapon), and the Whittier Middle School Braves. The changeover was completed for the 2005–2006 school year.

== Theater program ==
The program generally produced three productions every year.

== Notable alumni ==
- Jim Abbott, Class of 1985 – professional baseball player 1989-99, pitched no-hitter for New York Yankees; 1988 Olympic gold medalist; distinguishing characteristic was that he was born with only one hand.
- Tawona Alhaleem, Class of 1992 – former WNBA player
- Jim Ananich, Class of 1994 – American Politician, graduate of Michigan State University
- David W. Blight, Class of 1967 – Pulitzer Prize-winning Professor of History at Yale University, director of the Gilder Lehrman Center for the Study of Slavery, Resistance, and Abolition.
- Tony Branoff, Class of 1952 – All-State football player, 1953 MVP of University of Michigan football team
- Lloyd Brazil, Class of 1925 – All-American halfback for University of Detroit, 1927–1929
- Lynn Chandnois, Class of 1943 – first-round draft pick of NFL's Pittsburgh Steelers, All American in college football at Michigan State University
- Don Coleman, Class of 1949 – All-American and first Michigan State University football player to have jersey retired; educator, former MSU Dean of Students
- Marty Embry, Class of 1982 – won back-to-back State Champion titles with Central, played at DePaul University, drafted by Utah Jazz in 1986 and played 13 years overseas.
- Amir Mirza Hekmati, Class of 2001 – arrested by Iran on charges of spying on behalf of Central Intelligence Agency
- George Hoey, Class of 1965 – All-State football player, running back for University of Michigan and NFL's Arizona Cardinals, New England Patriots, San Diego Chargers, Denver Broncos, and New York Jets
- Clarence (Kelly) Johnson, Class of 1928 – famous aerospace engineer, formed Skunk Works for Lockheed Aircraft in Burbank, California; designed aircraft such as SR-71 Blackbird, U-2 Spy plane, Lockheed Electra, P-38 Lightning, F-117A Nighthawk (stealth fighter), F-104 Starfighter, T-33 Trainer, and C-130 Hercules transport.
- LaKisha Jones, Class of 1998 – American Idol finalist
- Craig Menear, class of 1975 - chairman and CEO of The Home Depot
- Ron Pruitt, Class of 1968 – professional baseball player for nine seasons
- Donald Riegle, Class of 1956 – United States Senator 1976–1995
- Jamarko Simmons, Class of 2004 – All-State football player, wide receiver for Western Michigan University; school leader all-time receptions; signed as undrafted free agent with Green Bay Packers; won Arena Football League championship with Jacksonville Sharks and United Football League championship with Virginia Destroyers.
- Antwaun Stanley, Class of 2005 - R&B singer and songwriter.
- Bernice Steadman, Class of 1943 - Aviator and Astronaut of Mercury 13 Space Program
- Eric Turner, Class of 1981 - runner-up "Mr. Basketball", played at University of Michigan
- Dayne Walling, Class of 1992 - American Politician, mayor of Flint, MI 2009-2015
- Coquese Washington, Class of 1989 – basketball player in WNBA after playing at Notre Dame University; first President of WNBA Player Association; presently women's head basketball coach at Penn State University.
- Herb Washington, Class of 1968 – world record holder 60-yard dash and 300-yard dash; played professional baseball for Oakland Athletics
- Andre Weathers, Class of 1994 – professional football player with New York Giants; played in Super Bowl in 2001; won national championship in 1997 playing for University of Michigan.
