= 2001 McDonald's All-American Boys Game =

American high school basketball game

West	East
131	125
	1st half	2nd half	Total
West	60	71	131
East	75	50	125
- Date: March 28, 2001
- Venue: Cameron Indoor Stadium, Durham, North Carolina
- MVP: Eddy Curry
- Referees: 1; 2; 3
- Attendance: 9,314
- Network: ESPN

McDonald's All-American

The 2001 McDonald's All-American Boys Game was an All-star basketball game played on Wednesday, March 28, 2001, at the Cameron Indoor Stadium in Durham, North Carolina. The game's rosters featured the best and most highly recruited high school boys graduating in 2001. The game was the 24th annual version of the McDonald's All-American Game first played in 1978.

== 2001 game ==
The game was telecast live by ESPN. The game was fast-paced and ended with one of the highest scores of the history of the event. The East team gained the lead in the first two quarters helped by Dajuan Wagner (who scored a total of 25 points, 11 in the first half), Chris Thomas and Julius Hodge. The first half ended with the East winning on the West by 15 points. Things changed in the second half, when Eddy Curry, Kelvin Torbert and Daniel Ewing led the West to a comeback. Curry had 28 points and earned the MVP award. Other players who starred were Kwame Brown and Tyson Chandler, who, like Curry, after the good performance decided to skip college and declare for the NBA draft; T. J. Ford, who recorded 11 points, 10 rebounds and 7 assists; and David Lee. Of the 24 players, 17 went on to play at least 1 game in the NBA. An unprecedented number of players declared their eligibility for the 2001 NBA draft: 5 McDonald's All-Americans chose to go straight to professional basketball. Among them, Kwame Brown became the first number 1 overall pick to be drafted directly out of high school. The others were Tyson Chandler (2nd overall), game MVP Eddy Curry (4th overall), DeSagana Diop (8th overall) and Ousmane Cisse (46th overall pick, never played in the NBA).

=== East roster ===
No.	Name	Height	Weight	Position	Hometown	High school	College of Choice
3	Rashaad Carruth	6-3	185	G	Mouth of Wilson, VA, U.S.	Oak Hill Academy	Kentucky
20	James White	6-7	180	F	Chatham, VA, U.S.	Hargrave Military Academy	Florida
21	Dajuan Wagner	6-3	205	G	Camden, NJ, U.S.	Camden	Memphis
24	Julius Hodge	6-5	185	F	The Bronx, NY, U.S.	St. Raymond	NC State
25	Maurice Williams	6-2	180	G	Jackson, MS, U.S.	Murrah	Alabama
30	Chris Thomas	6-1	165	G	Indianapolis, IN, U.S.	Pike	Notre Dame
42	Ousmane Cisse	6-9	250	F	Montgomery, AL, U.S.	St. Jude	Undecided (Did not attend)
44	Carlos Hurt	6-1	180	G	Louisville, KY, U.S.	Moore	Louisville
45	Anthony Richardson	6-7	190	F	Raleigh, NC, U.S.	Leesville Road	Florida State
50	DeSagana Diop	7-0	310	C	Mouth of Wilson, VA, U.S.	Oak Hill Academy	Undecided (Did not attend)
54	Kwame Brown	6-11	240	F	Brunswick, GA, U.S.	Glynn Academy	Florida (Did not attend)
55	David Harrison	7-0	240	C	Brentwood, TN, U.S.	Brentwood Academy	Undecided; Committed later to Colorado.

=== West roster ===
No.	Name	Height	Weight	Position	Hometown	High school	College of Choice
3	Daniel Ewing	6-4	180	G	Houston, TX, U.S.	Willowridge	Duke
5	Terrance Ford	6-0	170	G	Houston, TX, U.S.	Willowridge	Texas
11	Aaron Miles	6-3	185	G	Portland, OR, U.S.	Jefferson	Kansas
15	David Lee	6-8	220	F	St. Louis, MO, U.S.	Chaminade	Florida
20	Kelvin Torbert	6-4	200	G	Flint, MI, U.S.	Northwestern	Michigan State
21	Cedric Bozeman	6-6	190	G	Santa Ana, CA, U.S.	Mater Dei	UCLA
22	Josh Childress	6-6	190	G	Lakewood, CA, U.S.	Mayfair	Stanford
25	Wayne Simien	6-8	245	F	Leavenworth, KS, U.S.	Leavenworth	Kansas
31	Jawad Williams	6-7	185	F	Lakewood, OH, U.S.	St. Edward	North Carolina
32	Tyson Chandler	7-0	230	C	Compton, CA, U.S.	Dominguez	Undecided (Did not attend)
44	Rick Rickert	6-10	210	F	Duluth, MN, U.S.	East	Minnesota
52	Eddy Curry	6-11	290	C	South Holland, IL, U.S.	Thornwood	DePaul (Did not attend)

=== Coaches ===
The East team was coached by:

- Head Coach Jerry Faulkner of Charlotte Latin School (Charlotte, North Carolina)
- Asst Coach Donay Fullwood of Charlotte Latin School (Charlotte, North Carolina)
- Asst Coach Howard West of Charlotte Latin School (Charlotte, North Carolina)

The West team was coached by:

- Head Coach Robert Hughes of Paul Laurence Dunbar High School (Fort Worth, Texas)
- Asst Coach Leandros Rambo of Paul Laurence Dunbar High School (Fort Worth, Texas)
- Asst Coach Charles Hickman of Paul Laurence Dunbar High School (Fort Worth, Texas)

== All-American Week ==
=== Contest winners ===
- The 2001 Slam Dunk contest was won by David Lee.
- The 2001 3-point shoot-out was won by Maurice Williams.
