= Ian Schneider =

American film director (born 1992)

- Born: Ian Richard Schneider; October 3, 1992 (age 34); Flint, Michigan, U.S.
- Education: Pratt Institute
- Occupations: Director, Writer

Ian Schneider (born October 3, 1992), is an independent American film director and screenwriter.

== Early and personal life ==
Schneider was born to Tammy Schneider and author Paul Schneider. Born and raised in Flint, Michigan, Schneider graduated from Flint Northwestern High School in 2009. Schneider participated in his school's track team, drama department, and formed the Northwestern High School Film Festival in 2008. Schneider then went on to receive his Bachelor of Arts in film from Pratt Institute in 2013.

== Career ==
His first short film, Self (2011), written in Schneider's years in the Pratt Institute, allowed the audience to see the revelations behind Schneider's mind. His initial idea granted him access to start as a sophomore in college. In addition to the success of this short indie film, Schneider then started directing and producing his other films full-time. Soon after his first film, Schneider came through with another short film in the same year, Overnight (2011). Working with upcoming actors, Schneider produced a film about the sequence of the same areas over night. His initial idea was said to be filming at night for over a span of a week and encountering new wonders every time. As the result of the success of his first two films, he has written other short films, and has worked with a wide range of actors. His inspiration was said to be from author, Paul Schneider. In the documentary, “A Look Inside Ian Schneider,” Schneider indicates how as a child he wanted to see his fathers work on “the big screen.” Taking a short break, Ian Schneider broke success with his third film in 2012, Comets and Self-Loathing. This short film focuses on the self-hatred Schneider has within himself and with the outer space where he feels that he can explore his mind. With the dark toll Schneider took on this film, this created his biggest break through. Pratt Institute showcased it all over campus for a couple of weeks for the viewers to see. Schneider then plunged into a downward spiral for a couple of months. With therapy, Schneider produced his new film, Lost and Found (2013). This short film is about his internal conflict. However, he showcases it through a pianist about his lost soul and his found mind. Another great success for Schneider, he picked himself up again and continued filming. In the same year, Black Cat was produced into his last short film before graduating from Pratt. This movie is a dark tale based on Schneider's real life experience losing his childhood friend. This was said to be his worst critically received short film. With these negative comments, Schneider took a break and then produced his best film yet.

In post production, Forever, She (2014) became Schneider's biggest breakthrough. Working with actress and model, Marina V. Ryland, this indie short film showcases imagery of nature and the internal evolution of the female mind. This conceptual short film focuses on Ryland, herself, and how she goes from innocence to adulthood.

He is in post-production and has been submitted to Tribeca Film Festival 2015 for review. It has also been covered by IndieFest Magazines and Video. Schneider has been present on many filmmaking sites such as IndieTalk and Hope for Film and has received mixed reviews on his work.

He lives in Fort Green, Brooklyn, and continues to work on new short Indie films.

== Filmography ==
=== Short films ===
- Self (2011)
- Overnight (2011)
- Comets and Loathing (2012)
- Lost and Found (2013)
- Black Cat (2013)
- Forever, She (2014)
