= Yaroslav Korolev =

Russian basketball player (born 1987)

Personal information
- Born: 7 May 1987 (age 39) Moscow, Russian SFSR, Soviet Union
- Listed height: 6 ft 11 in (2.11 m)
- Listed weight: 245 lb (111 kg)

Career information
- NBA draft: 2005: 1st round, 12th overall pick
- Drafted by: Los Angeles Clippers
- Playing career: 2003–2016
- Position: Power forward
- Number: 21

Career history
- 2003–2004: Avtodor Saratov
- 2004–2005: CSKA Moscow
- 2005–2007: Los Angeles Clippers
- 2007–2009: Dynamo Moscow
- 2009–2010: Albuquerque Thunderbirds
- 2010: Reno Bighorns
- 2010–2011: CB Granada
- 2011–2012: Gipuzkoa BC
- 2012–2014: Spartak Saint Petersburg
- 2014–2015: Panionios
- 2015: Rethymno Cretan Kings
- 2016: Navarra

Career highlights
- Russian Cup winner (2005)
- Stats at NBA.com
- Stats at Basketball Reference

Yaroslav Igorevich Korolev (Russian: Ярослав Игоревич Королёв; born 7 May 1987) is a Russian former professional basketball player.

== Professional career ==
Korolev began his pro career with the Russian club Avtodor Saratov. Korolev was then selected 12th overall in the 2005 NBA draft, by the Los Angeles Clippers. Korolev played for CSKA Moscow in the Russian Super League, before joining the Clippers. On 6 July 2007 the Clippers offered Korolev a contract to remain with the team, but then rescinded their offer in September 2007. He then returned to the Clippers during the preseason, on a non-guaranteed contract, but was waived before the season began.

In December 2007, Korolev signed with Dynamo Moscow. In November 2009, Korolev was drafted in the fourth round of the NBDL, Draft by the Albuquerque Thunderbirds. He was traded to the Reno Bighorns on 19 January 2010.

On 26 July 2010 he signed a contract with Spanish club CB Granada. In August 2011, he signed with Lagun Aro GBC. In December 2012, he joined Spartak St. Petersburg.

In October 2014, Korolev signed with the Greek League team Panionios for the 2014–15 season. On 16 December 2016 Korolev announced his retirement. His last team was Basket Navarra Club, with which he played in 2016.

== NBA career statistics ==
Legend
GP	Games played	GS	Games started	MPG	Minutes per game
FG%	Field goal percentage	3P%	3-point field goal percentage	FT%	Free throw percentage
RPG	Rebounds per game	APG	Assists per game	SPG	Steals per game
BPG	Blocks per game	PPG	Points per game	**Bold**	Career high

=== Regular season ===
Year	Team	GP	GS	MPG	FG%	3P%	FT%	RPG	APG	SPG	BPG	PPG
2005–06	Clippers	**24**	0	**5.3**	**.300**	**.286**	**.700**	**.5**	**.4**	.1	.0	1.1
2006–07	Clippers	10	0	4.1	.250	.200	.500	.3	**.4**	**.3**	.0	**1.2**
Career		34	0	4.9	.283	.250	.625	.5	.4	.2	.0	1.1
