= Veno Belk =

American football player (born 1963)

No. 84
- Position: Tight end

Personal information
- Born: March 7, 1963 (age 63); Tifton, Georgia, U.S.
- Listed height: 6 ft 3 in (1.91 m)
- Listed weight: 233 lb (106 kg)

Career information
- High school: Flint Northwestern (Flint, Michigan)
- College: Michigan State
- NFL draft: 1986: undrafted

Career history
- Seattle Seahawks (1986)*; Atlanta Falcons (1987)*; Detroit Lions (1987)*; Buffalo Bills (1987); New York Giants (1988)*
- * Offseason or practice squad member only

Career NFL statistics
- Receptions: 1
- Receiving yards: 7
- Stats at Pro Football Reference

Veno Luzon Belk (born March 7, 1963) is an American former professional football player who was a tight end for the Buffalo Bills of the National Football League (NFL) in 1987. He played college football for the Michigan State Spartans.

== Career ==
Belk was a quarterback at Flint Northwestern High School before going on to play football at Michigan State University from 1982 to 1985. Initially recruited as a tight end, Belk would transition to linebacker at Michigan State, earning honorable mention All-Big Ten Conference status.

After college, Belk played for the Seattle Seahawks in 1986 preseason, but was cut before the regular season began. He spent the 1987 preseason with the Atlanta Falcons and Detroit Lions before he was waived by Detroit in August. Belk joined the Buffalo Bills during the 1987 National Football League Players Association strike. He started two games at tight end before being waived in mid-October. He signed with the New York Giants in March 1988 but was cut in August before the season began.
