= Marty Embry =

American chef, entrepreneur and basketball player

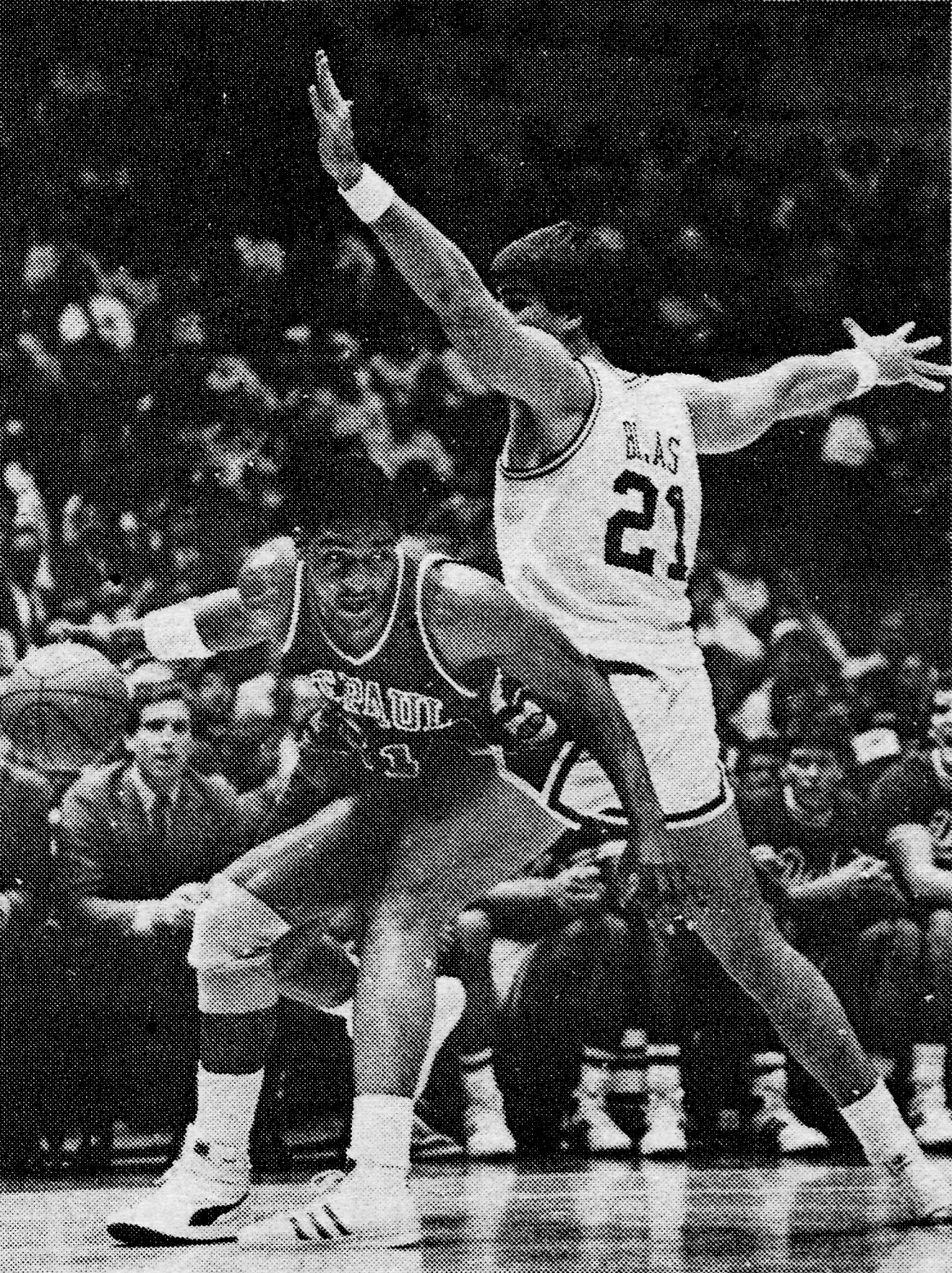
Embry (left) playing in the 1986 NCAA tournament

Marty Embry (born March 28, 1964) is an American chef, entrepreneur and former professional basketball player.

== Early life ==
Embry was born in Pine Bluff, Arkansas. He attended Flint Central High School in Flint, Michigan.

== Basketball career ==
At 6'9, 270 lbs., he was drafted out of DePaul University in the 4th round of the 1986 NBA draft by the Utah Jazz. He played professionally for 13 seasons. He played for the following teams in Europe and Asia: 86, Jersey Jammers 86–87 Tenerife AB, Spain 87–88 Castor's, Belgium 88–89 Castor's, Belgium 89–90 Pasabahce, Turkey 90–91 Pasabahce, Turkey 91–92 Pasabahce, Turkey 92 Pensacola, Florida (CBA) 92–93 Ferrara, Italy 93–94 Ferrara, Italy 94–95 Desio, Italy 95–96 Pistoia, Italy 96–97 Roma, Italy 97–98 Pozzuoli, Italy 98–99 Aisin Seahorses, Japan.

== Business career ==
Embry has owned multiple businesses, including his restaurant “51 To Go,” located in his hometown of Flint, Michigan. He is the author of 8 cookbooks and a self-help book called Diary of a Depressive.

== Personal life ==
Embry has a wife and two kids, including his son Jovan. Jovan, at 6'11, committed to play for Mississippi Valley State University in June 2016 and is currently a professional basketball player. They are the cousins of Wayne Embry, who won an NBA championship with the Boston Celtics in 1968.
