= Tamika Louis =

American basketball coach (born 1975)

Tamika LaShun Louis
Biographical details
- Born: June 17, 1975 (age 51); Flint, Michigan, U.S.

Playing career
- 1993–1994: West Virginia
- 1995–1998: Fresno State
- Position: Guard

Coaching career (HC unless noted)
- 1998–1999: Fresno Central HS (asst.)
- 2000–2001: Cuyahoga CC (assoc. HC)
- 2001–2002: Rhodes HS (asst.)
- 2002–2005: Mott CC
- 2007–2009: Illinois (asst.)
- 2009–2011: St. John's (asst.)
- 2011–2012: George Washington (asst.)
- 2012–2015: Delaware State

Head coaching record
- Overall: 23–67 (college); 59–35 (junior college)
- Tournaments: 1–2 (NJCAA D-II)

Accomplishments and honors

Championships
- MCCAA Eastern Conference (2005); NJCAA Region 12 (2005)

Awards
- MCCAA Coach of the Year (2005)

Tamika LaShun Louis (born June 17, 1975) is an American basketball coach who was most recently head women's basketball coach at Delaware State.

== Early life and education ==
Louis was born in Flint, Michigan and was the second of five children to Robert and Joyce Louis. She attended and graduated from Flint Northern High School, where she lettered in basketball and track.

As a freshman at West Virginia University, Louis played 19 games and averaged 3.9 points and 1.5 assists in the 1993–94 season. She then transferred to Fresno State, where she played from 1995 to 1998 and became a captain and starting point guard. As a senior in 1997–98, Louis averaged 5.4 assists per game to rank fourth in the Western Athletic Conference in that statistic.

Louis also was a member of the Fresno State Student-Athlete Advisory Board and had an internship with U.S. Senator Dianne Feinstein of California. Louis completed her bachelor's degree in communications in 1997 at Fresno State, enrolled in the master's in communication program by the start of her senior basketball season, and completed her master's degree in 1999.

== Coaching career ==
Louis started her coaching career as an assistant coach at Central High School in Fresno, California in the 1998–99 season. She moved to Cleveland and was associate head coach at Cuyahoga Community College in 2000–01 and James Ford Rhodes High School in 2001–02.

=== Mott CC ===
From 2002 to 2005, Louis was the head women's basketball coach at Mott Community College in Flint, Michigan, where she led her squad to a 59–35 overall record during her tenure, including a 28–9 record in 2004–05 that included a 16–0 MCCAA Eastern Conference record, NJCAA Region 12 title, and NJCAA Tournament berth. Louis earned Michigan Community College Athletic Association and NJCAA Region XII Coach of the Year honors.

=== Division I assistant (2007–2012) ===
From 2007 to 2009, Louis served as an assistant coach and recruiting coordinator for the University of Illinois. During her time at U of I, she recruited two top-20 ranked recruits Destiny Williams and Karisma Penn.

From 2009 to 2011, Louis was an assistant coach and recruiting coordinator for St. John's. Among her players was Second Team All-Big East and Freshman All-American Shennieka Smith.

In the 2011–12 season, Louis served as an assistant coach and recruiting coordinator during the 2011–2012 season at George Washington.

=== Delaware State ===
On May 31, 2012, Delaware State University hired Louis as women's basketball head coach. In three seasons, Louis had a 23–67 record. In her final season in 2014–15, multiple players' parents accused Louis of abusive behavior. One letter to the university president alleged that Louis used "harassment, intimidation, and threats to keep the players quiet about her dehumanizing behavior"; that letter led to the university formally investigating Louis and temporarily reassigning her within the athletic department in September 2014. Delaware State reinstated Louis on October 15, 2014; Louis's attorney said the investigation found no wrongdoing on Louis's part. On March 21, 2015, Delaware State decided not to renew Louis's contract. Delaware State finished the 2014–15 season with a 5–25 record.

== Business career ==
In addition to coaching, Louis has also worked at General Motors from 1999 to 2007, including as a Service Development Manager for the Northeast Region. In 2003, she won the company's Corporate Woman of the Year Achievement Award for representing the Accessory Department.

In 2015, Louis became communications manager at Fiat Chrysler Automobiles.

== Head coaching record ==
=== Junior college ===
Record table
Season	Team	Overall	Conference	Standing	Postseason
Mott Bears (MCCAA Eastern Conference) (2002–2005)
2002–03	Mott	19–11	10–3	T–2nd	
2003–04	Mott	12–16	7–9	6th	
2004–05	Mott	28–9	16–0	1st	NJCAA D-II Third Round
Mott:		59–35	33–12		
Total:		59–35			
National champion Postseason invitational champion Conference regular season champion Conference regular season and conference tournament champion Division regular season champion Division regular season and conference tournament champion Conference tournament champion

=== College ===
Record table
Season	Team	Overall	Conference	Standing	Postseason
Delaware State Hornets (Mid-Eastern Athletic Conference) (2012–2015)
2012–13	Delaware State	10–21	6–10	9th	
2013–14	Delaware State	8–21	3–13	T–12th	
2014–15	Delaware State	5–25	2–14	13th	
Delaware State:		23–67	11–37		
Total:		23–67			
