= Flint Southwestern Academy =

Location
- 1420 West 12th Street; Flint, Genesee, Michigan 48507; United States; 42.998°N 83.7°W

Information
- Type: Public, magnet
- School district: Flint Community Schools
- Superintendent: Derrick L. Lopez
- CEEB code: 231540
- NCES School ID: 261452005122
- Principal: Christopher Ochodnicky
- Teaching staff: 68
- Grades: 9-12
- Gender: Co-ed
- Student to teacher ratio: 18.31
- Campus: Urban
- Colors: Teal; White; Gold
- Athletics conference: Saginaw Valley League, MHSAA
- Mascot: Jaguars
- Rival: Flint Northwestern
- USNWR ranking: Bronze
- Affiliation: 101ksnhx
- Class/Div: Class B/Division 2
- Website: swa.flintschools.org/o/swa

Flint Southwestern Academy (FSA, Southwestern Academy, or Flint Southwestern) is located in Flint, Michigan, United States. This school is a part of the Flint Community Schools.

In 1989 Flint Academy closed and the school merged with Southwestern to become Flint Southwestern Academy. During the first year of the merger, the graduating class could choose what school was listed on their diploma: "Flint Academy", "Southwestern", or "Flint Southwestern Academy". The 2009 closing of Flint Central High School sent many former Flint Central High School students to Southwestern and led to the reopening of McKinley Middle School, which relieved potential overcrowding at Southwestern. Flint Southwestern Academy now serves grades 9–12.

== Academics ==
Flint Southwestern Academy is a state and nationally accredited school through the AdvancED/North Central Accreditation of Colleges and Schools.

== Demographic ==
Flint Southwestern Academy School Profile 2012/2013

Grade	Students
7	230
8	251
9	282
10	293
11	172
12	117
Ungraded	0
TOTAL	1,245

Male	Female
47%	53%

Enrollment	% of total
Total Minority	88%
American Indian/Alaskan Native	0%
Asian	0%
Black	79%
Hawaiian Native/Pacific Islander	0%
Hispanic	4%
White	12%
Two or More Races	5%

== Athletics ==
=== Boys Baseball ===
- 1978 Class A State Champion

=== Boys Track and Field ===
- 1961 Class A State Runner-up
- 1966 Class A State Champion
- 1975 Class A State Champion
- 1976 Class A State Runner-up
- 1977 Class A State Champion
- 1978 Class A State Runner-up

=== Boys Golf ===
- 1962 Class A State Champion
- 1963 Class A State Champion
- 1967 Class A State Champion

=== Boys Cross Country ===
- 1960 Class A State Runner-up
- 1962 Class A State Runner-up

=== Girls ===
None

=== Fall sports ===
- Football
- Volleyball
- Cross country (boys and girls)
- Boys soccer
- Boys tennis
- Girls golf

=== Winter sports ===
- Basketball (boys and girls)
- Bowling (boys and girls)
- Wrestling

=== Spring sports ===
- Baseball
- Softball
- Track & field (boys and girls)

== Notable alumni ==
- Charlie Bell, NBA player, member of Michigan State University 2000 National Championship team
- Miles Bridges (transferred to Huntington Prep in Huntington, West Virginia), NBA player for Charlotte Hornets
- Brian Carpenter, former NFL player
- Terry Crews, actor and former NFL player
- Mark Ingram II, 2009 Heisman Trophy winner, NFL player
- Rick Leach, former MLB player and University of Michigan quarterback
- Booker Moore, football standout at Penn State University, former NFL player
- Ricky Patton, former NFL player
- Corey Santee, basketball player
- Merv Rettenmund(baseball), former MLB player
- Daryl Turner, former NFL player
- Reggie Williams, football standout at Dartmouth College, former NFL player for Cincinnati Bengals

== See also ==
- Flint Community Schools
  - Flint Central Closed 2009
  - Flint Northern Closed 2013
  - Flint Northwestern Closed in 2018, Re-opened as Flint Junior High in 2019
