= Robert Garth =

American football player (born 1979)

No. 10
- Position: Wide receiver

Personal information
- Born: October 2, 1979 (age 47)
- Listed height: 6 ft 4 in (1.93 m)
- Listed weight: 250 lb (113 kg)

Career information
- High school: Flint Northern (Flint, Michigan)
- College: New Mexico State University
- NFL draft: 2000: undrafted

Career history
- Detroit Lions (2000–2001)*; Carolina Rhinos (2002); Green Bay Blizzard (2003–2006); Kansas City Brigade (2006); Tri-Cities Fever (2007); Arkansas Twisters (2008); Peoria Pirates (2008); Green Bay Blizzard (2008–2009)
- * Offseason or practice squad member only

Awards and highlights
- af2 Playmaker of the Year (2007)
- Stats at ArenaFan.com

Robert Garth (born October 2, 1979) is an American former football linebacker and wide receiver, who played for eight seasons in Arena Football 2. He is best known for his six-plus seasons with the Green Bay Blizzard. He played for the team from 2003 to 2006 and again in 2008 through 2009. Garth was honored by Arena Football 2 as one of the top 10 Ironman players of all time for his play both ways on offense and defense. Garth was known as "Superman" to the fans because of his aggressive and acrobatic style of play.

== High school ==
Garth attended Flint Northern High School and was a member of their state championship basketball with Mateen Cleaves and football team.

== College ==
Garth attended the City College of San Francisco for his first two years of college. He then transferred to New Mexico State University where he played both basketball and football.

== Arena Football 2 ==
Garth played eight seasons in Arena Football 2. He retired at the conclusion of the 2009 season even though he set career-highs in receptions (88) and receiving yards (971 yards). He finished his career as the Blizzard's all-time leading scorer (650 points). After his retirement, he was hired as the assistant head coach for the upcoming 2010 Indoor Football season.

== Basketball ==
Garth has also played professional basketball in the CBA for the Fort Wayne Fury.

== Coaching ==
Robert Garth started his coaching career in 1996 at Hartland High School in Hartland, Michigan, as a freshman basketball coach.

Due to his long football playing career, Garth's next coaching position wouldn't come until 2006 when he joined the staff for West De Pere High School's football team in West De Pere, Wisconsin. In the next few years, Garth held coaching positions with Green Bay East High School Basketball (2009), the Green Bay Blizzard (2010), and Green Bay Southwest High School Football (2012).

In 2013, Garth took a football coaching job with Little Chute High School in Little Chute, Wisconsin. He worked primarily with receivers, and used his professional experience to train a talented group of receivers. In his second year with the team, he helped guide the team to the WIAA Division 4 State Championship in 2014.

Following two successful seasons at Little Chute, Garth headed to Florida where he became a football coach at West Orange High School in Winter Garden for the 2015 season. While at West Orange, Garth worked closely with many future Division I athletes, including WR Eddie McDoom (Michigan) and QB Woody Barrett (Auburn).

Garth was a football coach at New Mexico State University, where he worked with the tight ends. He served from 2016 to 2018.

Served as Assistant Head Coach and Defensive Coordinator for the Allen D. Nease High School varsity football team in Ponte Vedra, Florida from 2019-2021 under Collin Drafts taking a 7th seeded team to the third round of the 2021 Florida 7A Regional Finals Playoff game before losing to 1st seeded Buchholz High School 37-14.

Former Director of Player Development for Arkansas State and New Mexico State Aggies football teams.

Returned to Allen D. Nease High School to coach football as Defensive Coordinator in 2024 to win District Championship and have undefeated regular season.

== Business activities ==
Aside from being a college coach, Robert Garth is the owner of three separate companies.

Team Me Clothing, LLC is both owned and operated by Garth. It specializes in clothing and accessories that offer customers unique designs and color palettes, as well as customization when bought in bulk.

Wide Out Nation is a training service created by Garth in which he trains football players who play wide receiver. He uses his experience and knowledge of the game to help players of all ages become better football players. Many of the players he has trained have gone on to become college football players who are at the top of their game.

Recruit University (sometimes referred to as "Recruit U") is a college recruiting service for athletes that are trying to play sports at the collegiate level. The service helps connect the athletes to coaches and gives them information about the recruiting process.
