= Dajuan Wagner =

American basketball player (born 1983)

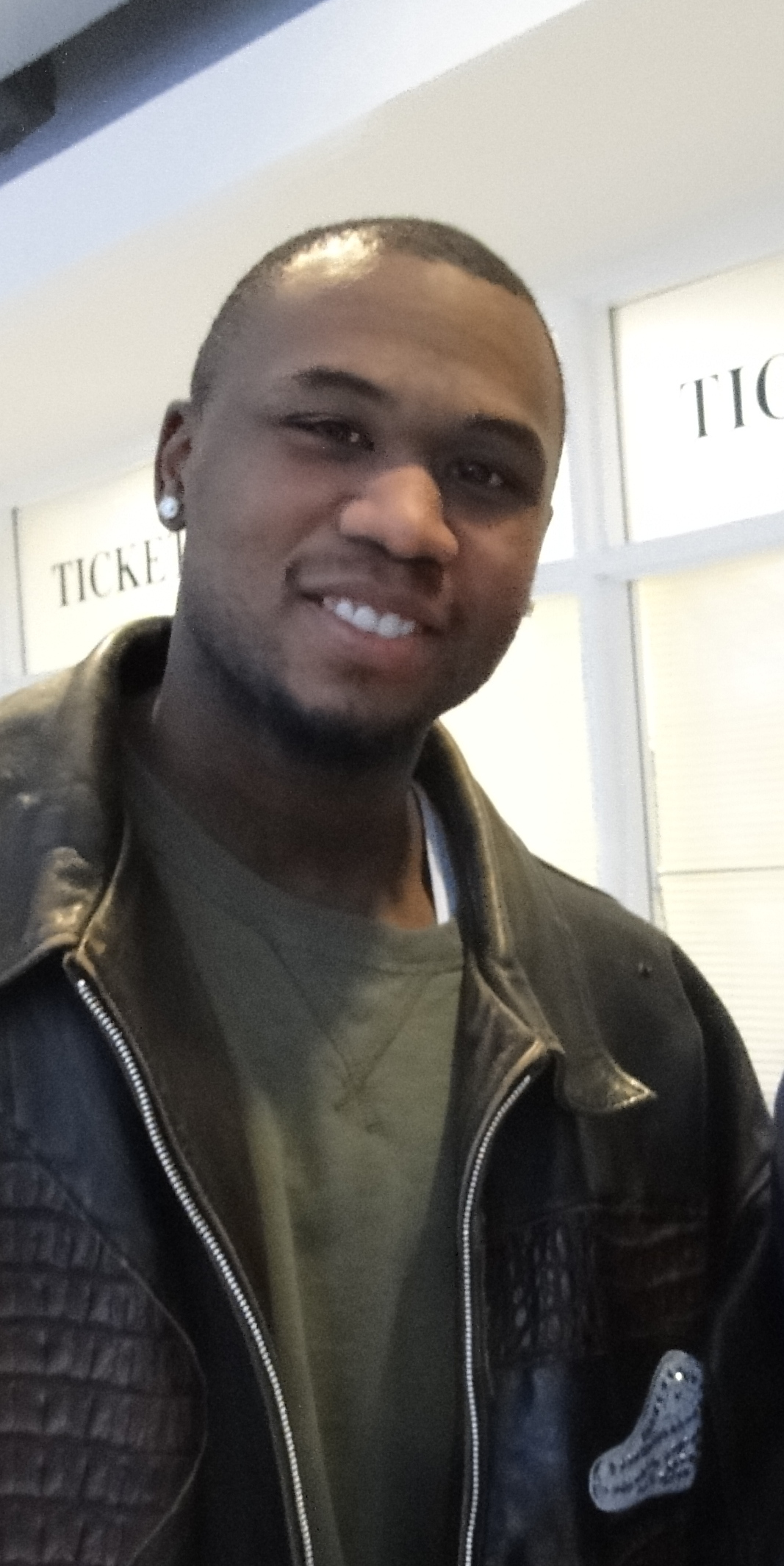
- Wagner in 2010

Personal information
- Born: February 4, 1983 (age 43) Camden, New Jersey, U.S.
- Listed height: 6 ft 1 in (1.85 m)
- Listed weight: 200 lb (91 kg)

Career information
- High school: Camden (Camden, New Jersey)
- College: Memphis (2001–2002)
- NBA draft: 2002: 1st round, 6th overall pick
- Drafted by: Cleveland Cavaliers
- Playing career: 2002–2007
- Position: Shooting guard
- Number: 2, 0

Career history
- 2002–2005: Cleveland Cavaliers
- 2006: Golden State Warriors
- 2007: Prokom Trefl Sopot

Career highlights
- NIT champion (2002); NIT MVP (2002); First-team All-Conference USA (2002); National high school player of the year (2001); McDonald's All-American (2001); First-team Parade All-American (2001); Second-team Parade All-American (2000)

Career NBA statistics
- Points: 964 (9.4 ppg)
- Rebounds: 142 (1.4 rpg)
- Assists: 195 (1.9 apg)
- Stats at NBA.com
- Stats at Basketball Reference

Dajuan Marquett Wagner Sr. (born February 4, 1983) is an American former professional basketball player. He is the son of former University of Louisville and National Basketball Association player Milt Wagner and left the NBA early into his career because of debilitating health problems. He was drafted sixth overall by the Cleveland Cavaliers in the 2002 NBA draft.

== High school career ==
Wagner attended Camden High School, where he played with the varsity team freshman year. He debuted on December 19, 1997, against Highland High School, scoring 12 points. He went on to play in 27 games his first season, averaging 27.3 points and recording a season-high of 45 points against Red Bank on February 13, 1998, and at the end of the season he received the Freshman of the Year award from ESPN. In his sophomore year, Dajuan played in 17 games and had a new career-high of 57 points against Pennsauken Tech on January 26. He finished the season averaging 35.3 points per game, and won the ESPN Sophomore of the Year award.

The following year he played in 28 games. On January 31, 2000, he scored 80 points (24 of which in the fourth quarter) in a 122–66 win against Pennsauken Tech. In his junior year he was already considered one of the top players of his class. At the end of the season he had an average of 31.9 points per game. For his senior year he debuted on December 15 scoring 36 points against Eastern, followed by a 50-points performance against Bishop Eustace.

On January 16, 2001, he scored 100 points against Camden County Tech. He converted 42 of his 61 field goals (with 10 3-pointers) and 6 free throws: he scored 25 points in the first quarter, 21 in the second, 26 in the third and 28 in the fourth. He went on to score 50 or more points 4 more times during the season, and averaged 42.5 points in 29 games played as a senior. He scored 3,462 points in high school (the most in New Jersey high school history, breaking former high school star John Somogyi's scoring record of 3,451 points; when Somogyi played there was no 3-point shot), and scored 25 points in the McDonald's All-American Game. Wagner is considered by many to be the greatest high school basketball player in New Jersey history.

== College career ==
Wagner considered offers from Connecticut, Kentucky, Louisville, Memphis and Miami (FL), and signed with Memphis in June 2000. He played one year of college basketball at the University of Memphis. He scored a season-high 32 points against Old Dominion on November 14, 2001, in his 2nd game with Memphis, and tied his season high on March 26, 2002, against Temple during the NIT semifinal. He contributed with 16 points in the title game win against South Carolina and at the end of the season he earned several NIT and conference honors, including the MVP award of the 2002 NIT. He also broke the record for points in a single season for Memphis with 762.

His coach, John Calipari, revoked Wagner's scholarship after his freshman year to force him to enter the NBA, because Calipari believed that Wagner should not avoid the money he would receive as a first-round draft pick.

=== College statistics ===
Year	Team	GP	GS	MPG	FG%	3P%	FT%	RPG	APG	SPG	BPG	PPG
2001–02	Memphis	36	35	31.8	.410	.317	.722	2.5	3.6	1.2	0.6	21.2

== Professional career ==
=== Cleveland Cavaliers (2002–2005) ===
Wagner was chosen with the sixth overall pick of the 2002 NBA draft by the Cleveland Cavaliers. In his rookie season he averaged 13.4 points per game and shot 36.9% from the field.

Wagner was hampered by injuries and health problems thereafter. He averaged a career-low 4.0 points in 11 games played during the 2004–05 season, and was hospitalized for ulcerative colitis. The Cavaliers did not exercise their option on his contract for the 2005–06 season and subsequently Wagner was out of the league.

=== Golden State Warriors (2006) ===
Wagner's colitis condition was not amenable to medication and, after consulting with New York Knicks head coach Larry Brown, who referred him to a New York medical expert, he underwent surgery to remove half his colon on October 25, 2005, at Mount Sinai Hospital.

On September 22, 2006, Wagner signed a two-year $1.6 million contract with the Golden State Warriors. On November 20, two months after he recovered from a serious illness to make an NBA comeback, the Warriors bought out his contract after he had played one game for the team. That one game that Wagner played with Golden State ended up being the only game he played in the 2006–2007 season and the final game of his NBA career. The game was played on November 11, 2006, with the Warriors defeating the Detroit Pistons 111–79. Wagner recorded 4 points and 1 assist.

=== Prokom Trefl Sopot (2007) ===
On August 31, 2007, Wagner signed a one-year contract with Prokom Trefl Sopot in Poland. Averaging 8.3 points in six games, he returned to South Jersey after hurting his hip and reinjuring his knee in Poland.

On October 12, 2015, he attempted to return to basketball and planned to sign with the AmeriLeague. However, the league folded days later, after it was discovered that the founder was a con artist.

Wagner has been a resident of West Deptford Township, New Jersey.

== Career statistics ==
Legend
GP	Games played	GS	Games started	MPG	Minutes per game
FG%	Field goal percentage	3P%	3-point field goal percentage	FT%	Free throw percentage
RPG	Rebounds per game	APG	Assists per game	SPG	Steals per game
BPG	Blocks per game	PPG	Points per game	**Bold**	Career high

=== NBA ===
==== Regular season ====
Year	Team	GP	GS	MPG	FG%	3P%	FT%	RPG	APG	SPG	BPG	PPG
2002–03	Cleveland	**47**	**24**	**29.5**	.369	.316	**.800**	**1.7**	**2.8**	**.8**	.1	**13.4**
2003–04	Cleveland	44	4	16.1	.366	.360	.681	1.3	1.2	.6	**.2**	6.5
2004–05	Cleveland	11	0	9.3	.317	.192	.750	.2	1.2	.5	.0	4.0
2005–06	Golden State	1	0	7.0	**1.000**	**1.000**	.500	.0	1.0	.0	.0	4.0
Career		103	28	21.4	.366	.321	.770	1.4	1.9	.7	.1	9.4

== Personal life ==
Wagner is the son of Milt Wagner, who was a second-round pick in the 1986 NBA draft.

Wagner's son, Dajuan Wagner Jr., was ranked the No. 6 basketball recruit in the country for the class of 2023, according to 247Sports and selected as a McDonald's All American in 2023.

== See also ==
- List of basketball players who have scored 100 points in a single game
- List of second-generation National Basketball Association players
- List of people diagnosed with ulcerative colitis
