= Flint Community Schools =

School district in Michigan

Address
- 923 E. Kearsley St Flint, Genesee, Michigan, 48503; United States

District information
- Type: Public
- Grades: PreK–12
- Superintendent: Kevelin B. Jones II
- Schools: 10 schools, including 3 secondary schools
- Budget: $74,669,000 2022-2023 expenditures
- NCES District ID: 2614520

Students and staff
- Students: 2,605 (2024–2025)
- Teachers: 128.8 (on an FTE basis) (2024-2025)
- Staff: 603.73 (on an FTE basis) (2024-2025)
- Student–teacher ratio: 20.23 (2024-2025)

Other information
- Website: www.flintschools.org

Flint Community Schools is a school district headquartered in Flint, Michigan, United States. Its boundary includes almost all of the city limits.

In the last fifty years, the Flint Community Schools district has endured the same hardships that have shaped the city of Flint. Due to the role of General Motors, the city had nearly 200,000 residents and 47,867 public school students in 1968. Enrollment numbers dropped steadily until the 2022-2023 school year, when there were 2,840 students and about 80,000 residents.

== History ==
A union school district was organized in Flint in the 1870s, and the town chose the unfinished city hall, at the corner of Saginaw and Third Streets, to be the high school in 1875. Flint's high school was located in this building until a new building, Flint High School, was built in 1923. It became Central High School when Flint Northern High School was built in 1928.

As the Great Migration increased the Black population in Flint, Flint Community Schools practiced racial segregation into the 1960s. Although there was no written policy of discrimination, the district reinforced de facto segregation that existed in the neighborhoods. Boundaries of school attendance areas were often drawn according to race, and majority-Black schools were overcrowded while all-white schools nearby were under capacity. To address a federal desegregation order, the district created a system of magnet schools in the early 1970s that any student could attend. This system contributed to the lifting of the desegregation order in 2002.

The current mission statement of "developing a community of learners who are prepared to live, work, and contribute to an ever changing society" was developed by Walter Milton, who became Superintendent in 2005. Milton subsequently wrote a book entitled Me in the Making which included a chapter on his stormy tenure in Flint.

For the 2011-2012 school year, the Flint Community Schools had both middle schools, four elementary schools and one high school placed in the bottom 5% of all schools in the State of Michigan based on student achievement and attendance.

In November 2012, Superintendent Linda Thompson announced her retirement. Thompson assumed the Superintendentship in 2008 and set about downsizing the District by closing schools. In late 2011 the District was found to be running a deficit of 3.7 million dollars by the accounting firm of Yeo and Yeo. In early 2012 the Flint School Board opted not to extend Superintendent Thompson's contract beyond the current year, citing the deficit and her previous effectiveness rating of 2.7 out a possible 4.0 points.

In December 2012, Lawrence Watkins Jr. was selected to serve as the Districts Interim Superintendent. Larry Watkins helped the Flint School District usher in a comprehensive educational plan, negotiate concessions from bargaining units and collaborate with community organizations to bring back the community education model. At the same time, Watkins saw Flint schools' deficit grow from $4 million to $21.9 million in a little over two years, thousands of students leave the district and numerous school buildings closed. On April 8, 2015, Mr. Watkins announced his retirement.

In August 2018, Flint Community Schools selected Derrick Lopez, JD as its new Superintendent. One of his first acts was to secure funding from the Elon Musk Foundation in the amount of $480,350 to replace each water fountain in all of the Flint Community Schools with new water stations and two filtration systems: carbon filtration to remove the lead and ultraviolet filtration to remove other chemicals and soluble particulates.

In June 2020, Anita Steward took over the helm at Flint Community Schools. Before becoming the superintendent, Mrs. Steward was the Assistant Superintendent. The sixth superintendent to resign or be fired between 2011 and 2021, Steward resigned in November 2021 amidst her lawsuit against the school board claiming that they interfered with her operation of the district. Acting superintendent Kevelin B. Jones II then took the position.

== New High School ==
The 1923 Flint Central High School closed at the end of the 2008-2009 school year and then sat vacant. In 2025, the Flint nonprofit Charles Stewart Mott Foundation contributed $100 million toward the cost of building a new high school on the campus, incorporating the former building's tower and other elements. The Michigan Department of Education contributed a grant to cover the remainder of the costs for a total estimated cost of $135 million. The 1,000-student state-of-the-art building is planned to open in fall 2028. Demolition of Flint Central and the vacant Whittier Classical Academy next door began in summer 2026.

== Schools ==
School	Address	Built	Notes
Accelerated Learning Academy	1602 S. Averill	1951	Formerly Scott Elementary School
Brownell Elementary School	6302 Oxley Dr.	1958	Grades K-2, STEM School (Science, Technology, Engineering, and Math)
Doyle/Ryder Education Center	1040 N. Saginaw St	1902	Incorporates 1902 Doyle School
Durant-Tuuri-Mott Elementary School	1518 University Ave.	1923	
Eisenhower Elementary School	1235 Pershing Street	1966	
Freeman Elementary School	4001 Ogema Ave	1954	
Holmes STEM Middle School Academy	6602 Oxley Dr.	1962	Formerly Holmes Middle School
Potter Elementary School	2500 N Averill Ave.	1953	
Southwestern Classical Academy	1420 W 12th St.	1959	Formerly Southwestern High School

Repurposed Schools
School	Address	Built	Notes
Bunche Elementary	4121 Martin Luther King Blvd.	1967	Now Bunche Community Center
Coolidge Elementary School	3615 Van Buren Ave.	1929	Closed in 2011, sold to Communities First Inc. for office and housing use
Cummings Elementary School	G-2200 Walton Avenue	1956	Became Great Expectations Early Childhood Center in 2016
Dewey Elementary School	4119 N. Saginaw St.	1921	Now the Sylvester Broome Empowerment Village
Gundry Elementary School	6031 Dupont St.	1955	Closed 2008, Now Cathedral of Faith Ministries
Lawndale Elementary School	3115 Lawndale Ave.	1951	Built 1951 as St. Luke Catholic School, leased to Flint Schools in 1995, Closed 2004. Now St. Luke’s N.E.W. Life Center
Lincoln Elementary School	2820 S. Saginaw St.	1918	Became International Academy of Flint charter school in 1999
Oak Elementary School	1000 Oak Street	1890	Closed in 1976, reopened in 2014 as Oak Street Senior Housing
Pierce Elementary School	1101 W. Vernon Drive	1958	Closed in 2025, Now Pierce Creative Arts Charter school
Selby Elementary School	5005 Cloverlawn Drive	1956	Sold and became Eagles Nest Academy in 2015
Sobey Elementary School	3701 N. Averill Avenue	1962	Closed 2003, now Boys & Girls Club of Greater Flint
Summerfield Elementary School	1360 Milbourne Ave.	1970	Closed in 2012, reopened as early childcare center
Walker Elementary School	817 E. Kearsley St.	1960	Closed 1988, now Walker Center office building

Closed Schools
School	Address	Built	Notes
Bryant Jr. High	201 E. Pierson Road	1958	Reopened as Elementary in 2002, closed in 2013, abandoned
Carpenter Road Elementary	6901 N. Webster Rd	1965	Closed in 2015, abandoned
Civic Park Elementary School	1402 W. Dayton St.	1922	Closed in 2009, abandoned
Cook Elementary	500 Welch Blvd.	1917	Closed in 2002, abandoned
Dort Elementary	601 E. Witherbee St.	1976	Closed in 2013, abandoned
Garfield Elementary School	301 E. McClellan St.	1928	Closed in 2009, abandoned
Jefferson Elementary School	5306 North Street	1926	Closed in 1988, Last used as Northridge Academy, later 2nd Chance Baptist Church of Flint, abandoned
Johnson Elementary School	5323 Western Road	1967	Closed in 2006, last used as Johnson AAA School, abandoned
King Elementary School	520 W. Rankin St.	1970	Closed 2006, abandoned
Longfellow Jr. High	1255 N. Chevrolet Ave.	1928	Closed in 2006, abandoned
Lowell Jr. High	3301 N Vernon Ave	1929	Alternative middle school from 1988-2003, closed in 2003, abandoned
Manley Elementary School	3002 Farley Street	1969	Closed in 2004, Abandoned
Merrill Elementary School	1501 W. Moore St	1953	Closed in 2009, abandoned
Neithercut Elementary School	1010 Crestbrook Ln.	1955	Closed in 2025, abandoned
Northwestern High School	G-2138 Carpenter Rd.	1964	Renamed Flint Junior High in 2018, closed in 2020, abandoned
Wilkins Elementary	121 E. York Ave.	1972	Closed in 2010, abandoned
Williams Elementary	3501 Minnesota Ave.	1969	Closed in 2010, abandoned
Zimmerman Jr. High	2421 Corunna Rd.	1924	Closed in 2013, abandoned

Demolished Schools
School	Address	Built	Notes
Anderson Elementary School	3248 Mackin Road	1965	Closed in 2009, Slated for Demolition in 2026
Central High School	601 Crapo St	1923	Closed in 2009, demolished in 2026
Clark Elementary School	1519 Harrison St.	1912	Closed in 1971, demolished in 2014
Cody Elementary School	3201 Fenton Road	1925	Closed in 2003, demolished in December 2012
Fairview Elementary School	1300 Leith St.	1915	Closed 1971, later served as Alternative Junior High School, then Flint Schools of Choice. Demolished 1976
Hazelton Elementary School	1301 W. 2nd St.	1843	Closed in 1964, Demolished in 1966
Homedale Elementary School	1501 Davison Road	1914	Closed in 2003, added onto in 1922 & 1966, burned on September 11, 2010, now a vacant lot
Kennedy School	1541 N. Saginaw Street	1940	Built as St. Paul Lutheran School, sold to Flint Schools in 1963 and named Mary Street School. Renamed John F. Kennedy School in 1966. Closed 1977, Demolished 2011
McKinley Middle School	4501 Camden Ave.	1929	Closed in 2012, Slated for Demolition in 2026
Northern High School #1 / Emerson Jr. High	401 E. McClellan St.	1925	Became Emerson in 1971 after new Northern High School was built. Later became The Flint Academy, demolished 1989
Northern High School #2	3284 Mackin Rd.	1971	Renamed Northern Academy, closed in 2014, Slated for Demolition in 2026
Lewis Elementary School	3218 N. Franklin Ave.	1911	Became Lowell Jr. High Annex in 1978, demolished in 1991
Washington Elementary School	1400 N. Vernon Avenue	1922	Closed in 2013, burned down October 7, 2021, demolished
Martin Community Elementary School	6502 Stafford Place	1924	Closed in 2002, razed in 2011, now vacant lot
Parkland Elementary School	3319 North St.	1913	Closed in 1976, demolished in 1997
Pierson Elementary School	300 E. Mott Ave.	1928	Closed in 2002, demolished in 2007
Stevenson Elementary School	510 W. 6th Ave.	1909	Became Rankin School, demolished 1982
Stewart Elementary School	1950 Burr Blvd.	1955	Closed in 2009, Slated for Demolition in 2026
School of Choice	517 E. 5th Avenue	1927	Formerly St. Michael's High School, became The Center For Hope in 2010, demolished in 2017
Whittier Middle School	800 Crapo Street	1925	Closed in 2008, demolished 2026
