= 2005 NBA draft =

Basketball player selection

General information
- Sport: Basketball
- Date: June 28, 2005
- Location: The Theater at Madison Square Garden (New York City, New York)
- Network: ESPN

Overview
- 60 total selections in 2 rounds
- League: NBA
- First selection: Andrew Bogut (Milwaukee Bucks)

The 2005 NBA draft took place on June 28, 2005, in the Theater at Madison Square Garden in New York City. In this draft, NBA teams took turns selecting amateur college basketball players and other first-time eligible players, such as players from high schools and non-North American leagues. The NBA announced that 49 college and high school players and 11 international players had filed as early-entry candidates for the draft.

This was the last NBA draft for which high school players were eligible. The new collective bargaining agreement between the league and its players union established a new age limit for draft eligibility. Starting with the 2006 NBA draft, players of any nationality who complete athletic eligibility at a U.S. high school cannot declare themselves eligible for the draft unless they turn 19 no later than December 31 of the year of the draft and are at least one year removed from the graduation of their high school classes. International players, defined in the NBA's collective bargaining agreement as non-US nationals who did not complete athletic eligibility at a U.S. high school, must turn 19 (or older) in the calendar year of the draft, up from 18.

This draft is notable for a most recent draft pick from an NAIA (and non-NCAA) school in any round; that pick is Robert Whaley, the 51st player drafted from Walsh University, which is now in NCAA Division II. The last remaining active member of this draft class was Chris Paul, who announced his retirement during the 2025–26 NBA season.

== Draft selections ==
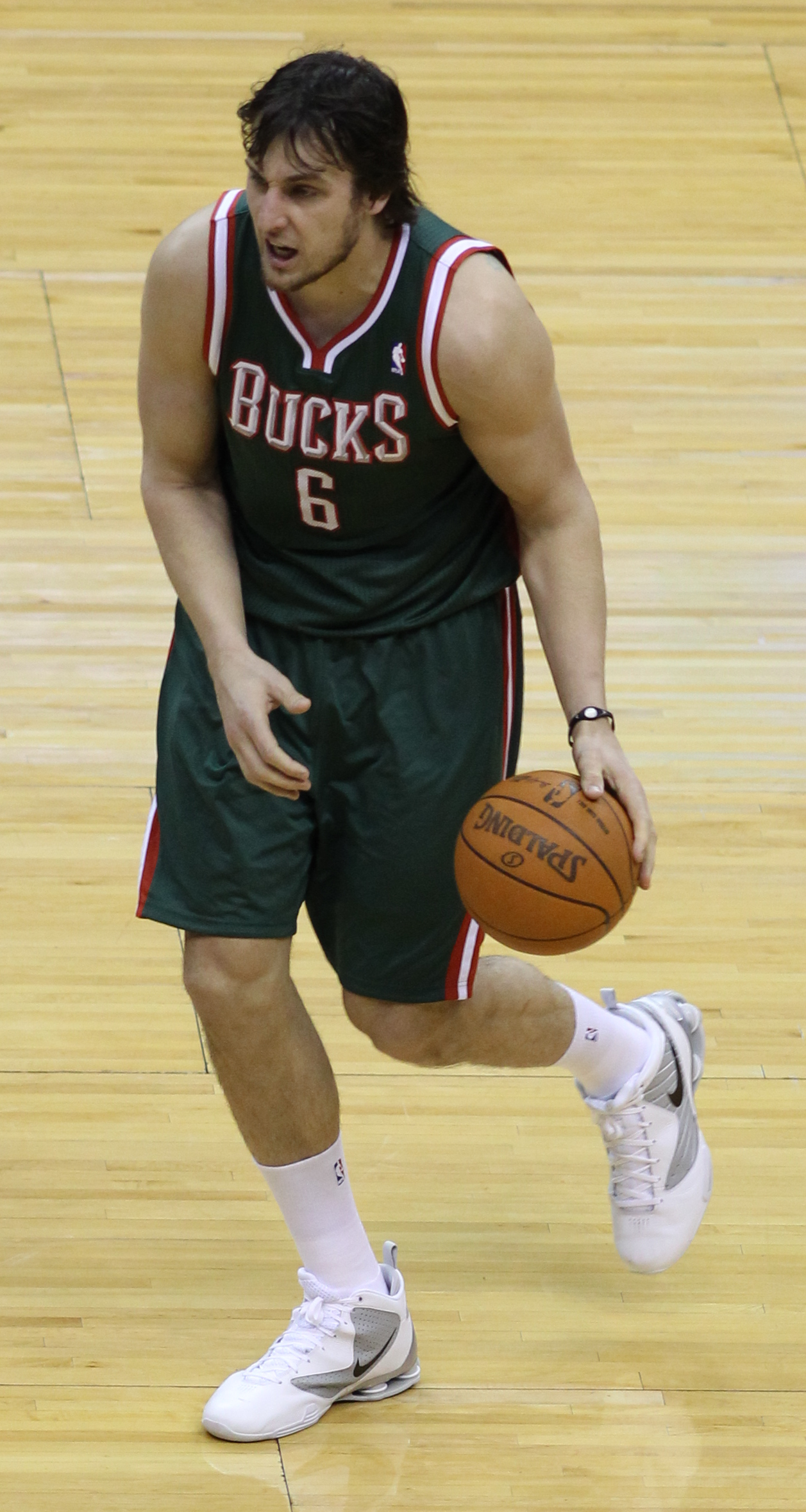
Andrew Bogut was selected 1st overall by the Milwaukee Bucks.

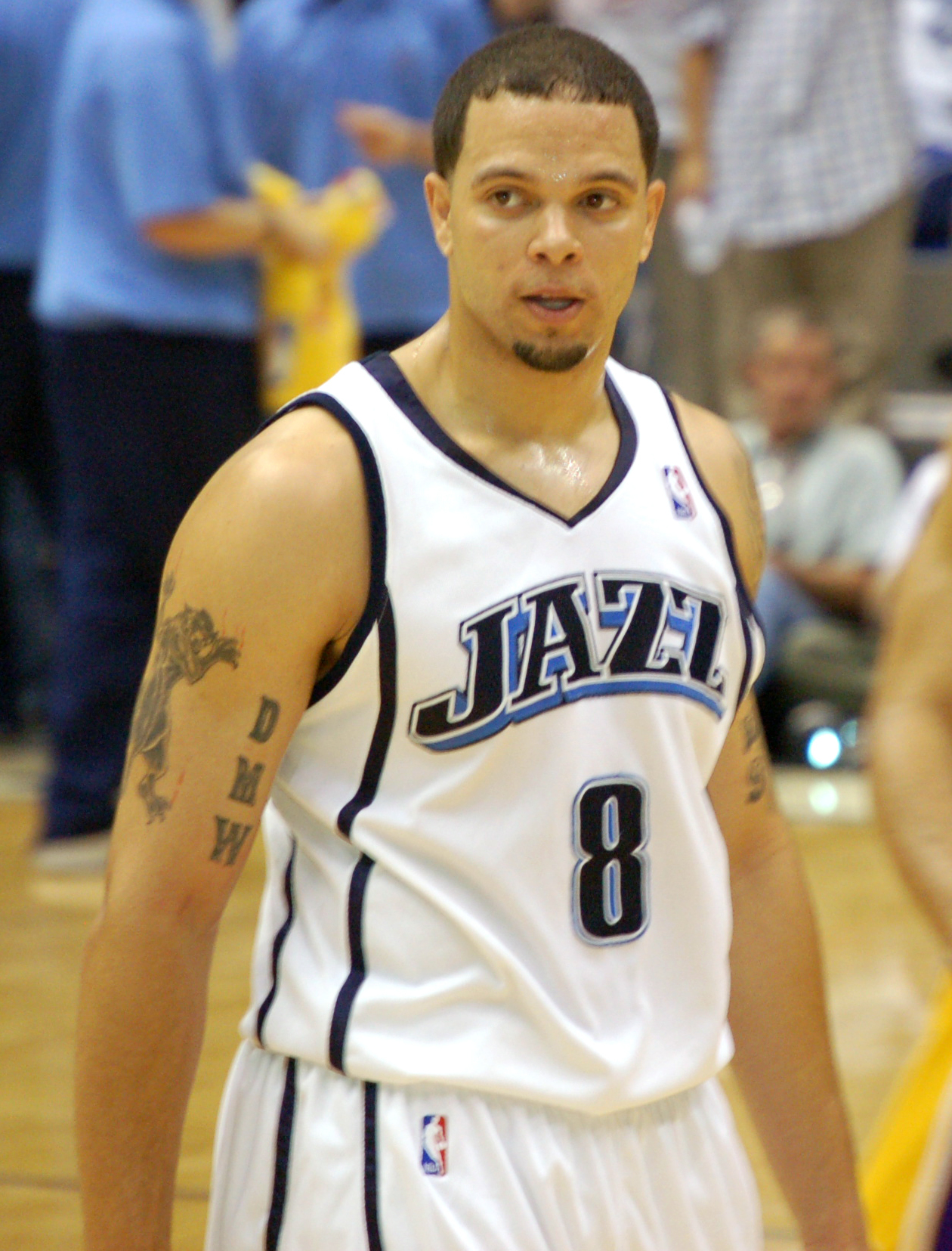
Deron Williams was selected 3rd overall by the Utah Jazz.

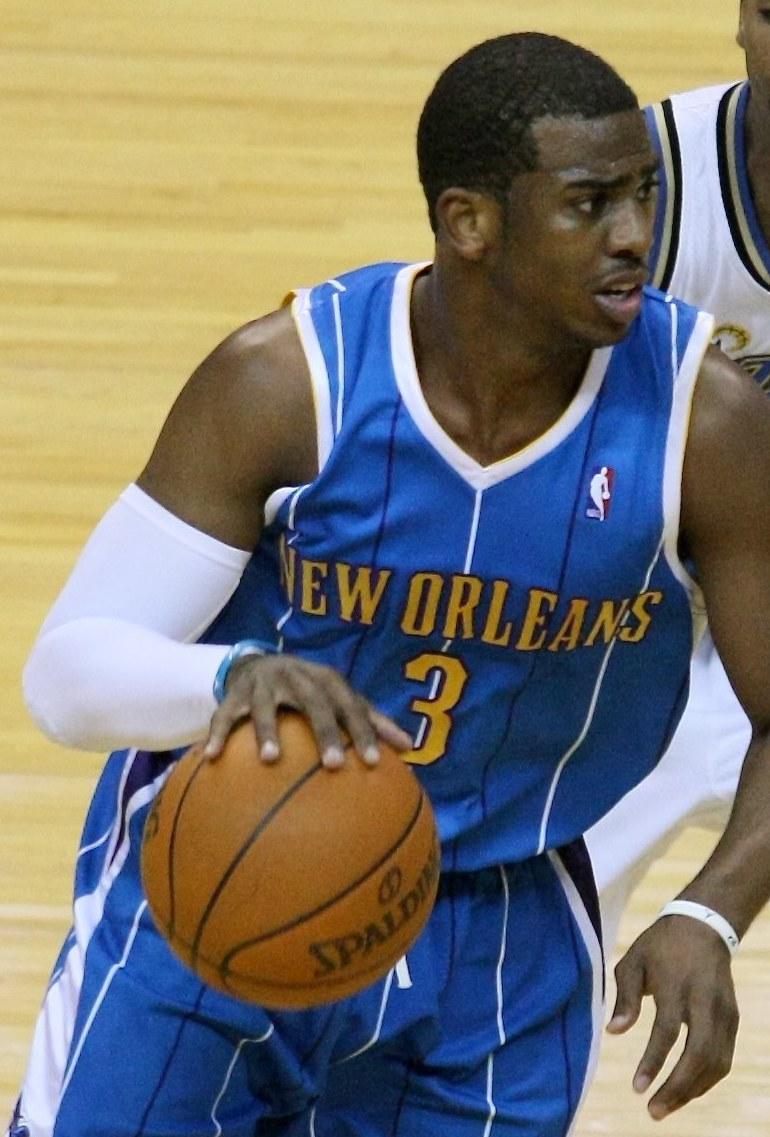
Chris Paul was selected 4th overall by the New Orleans Hornets.

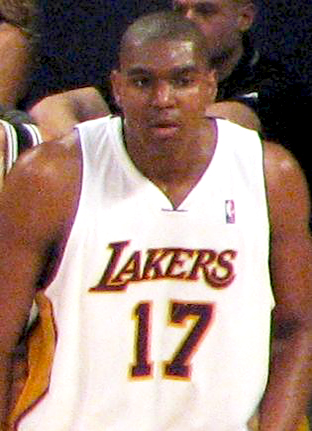
Andrew Bynum was selected 10th overall by the Los Angeles Lakers.

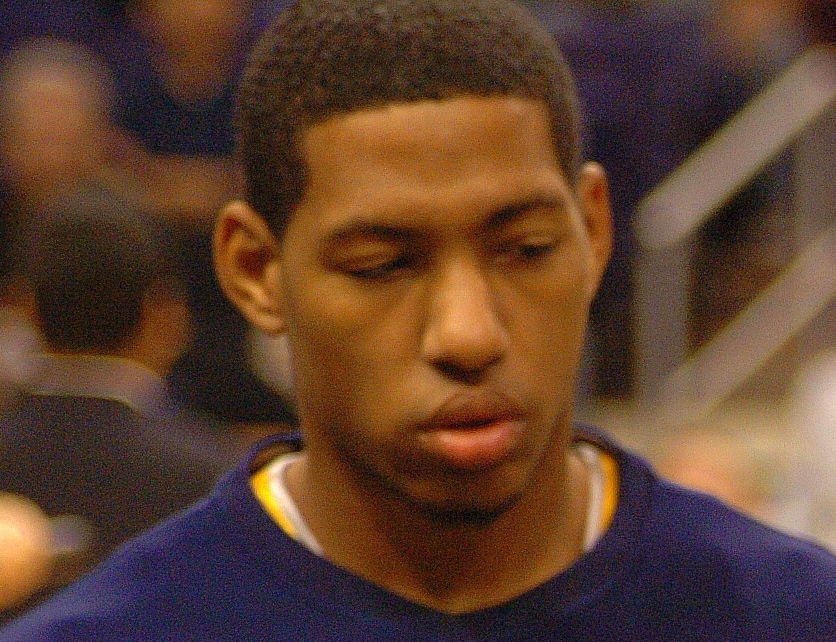
Danny Granger was selected 17th overall by the Indiana Pacers.

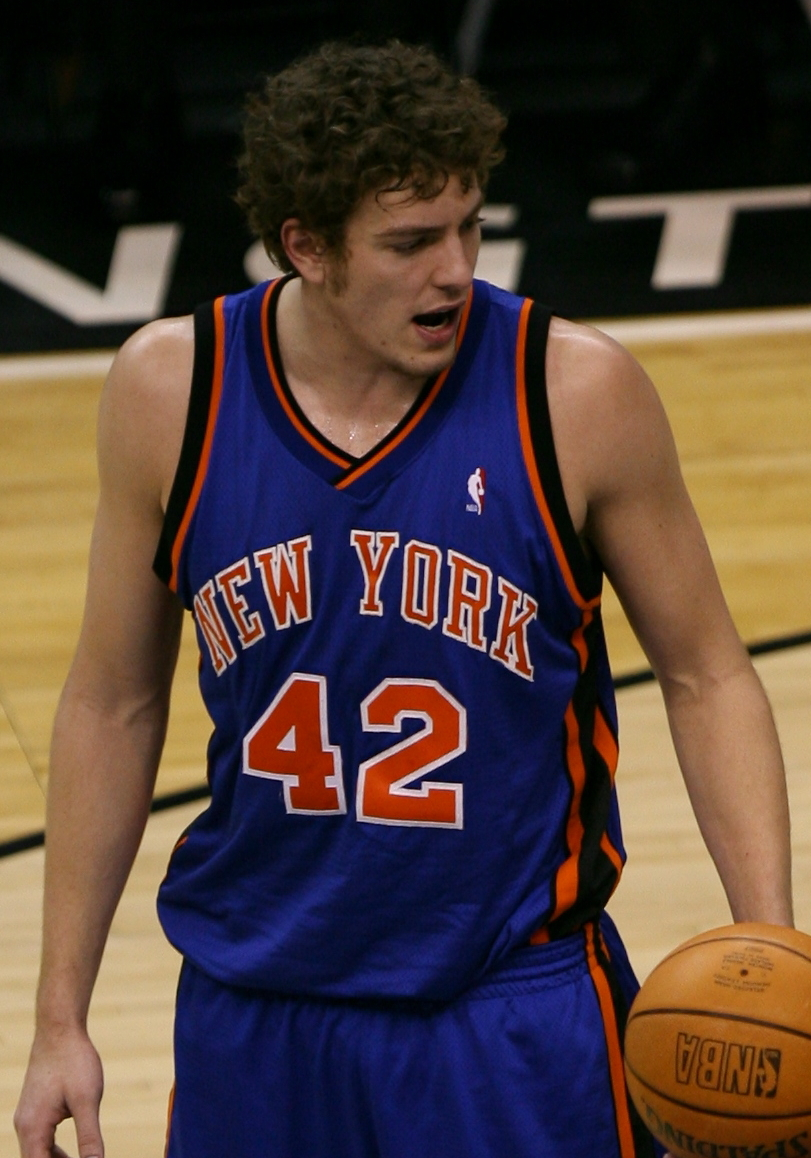
David Lee was selected 30th overall by the New York Knicks.

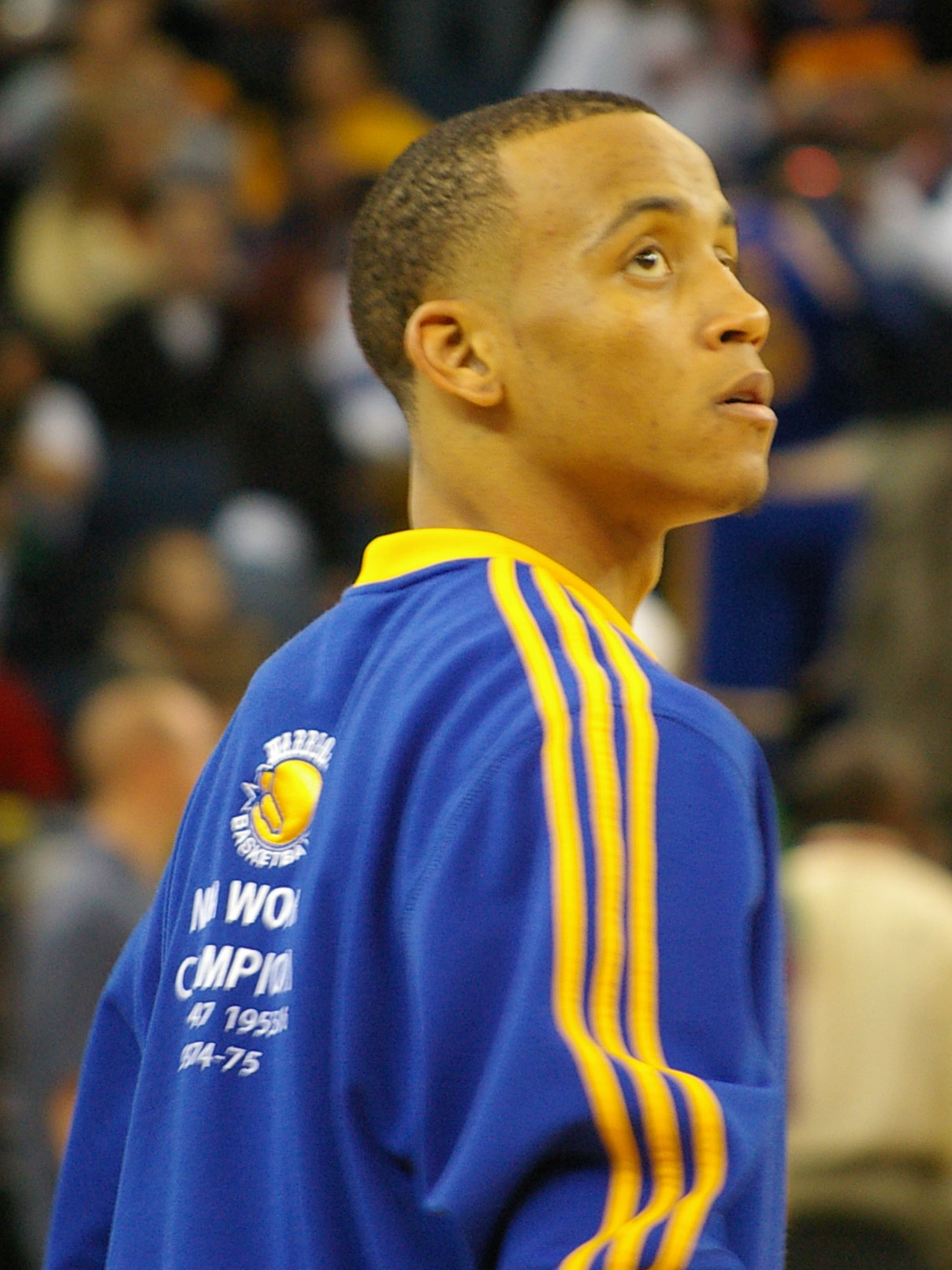
Monta Ellis was selected 40th overall by the Golden State Warriors.

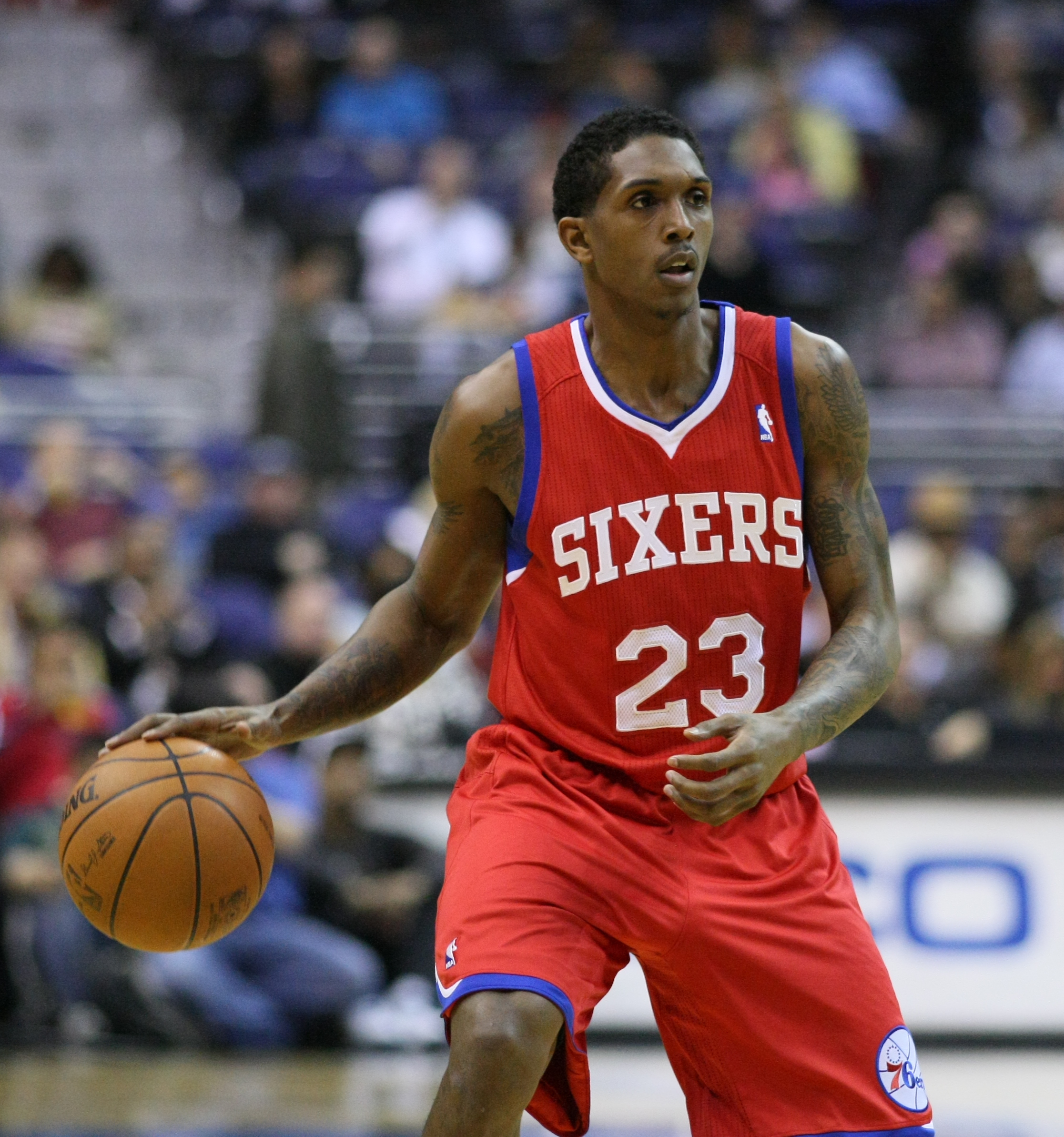
Lou Williams was selected 45th overall by the Philadelphia 76ers.

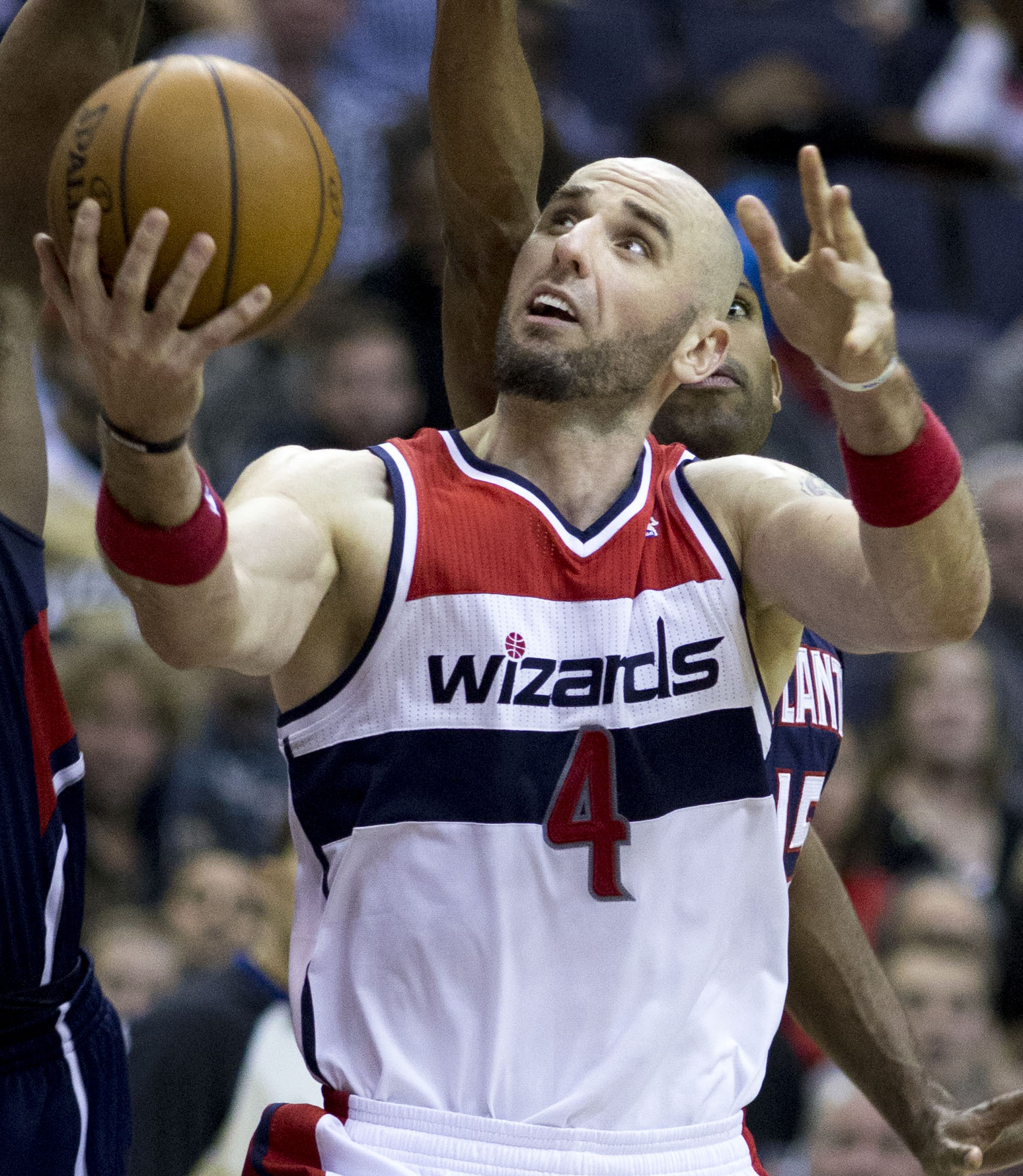
Marcin Gortat was selected 57th overall by the Phoenix Suns.

G	Guard	F	Forward	C	Center

*	Denotes player who has been selected for at least one All-Star Game and All-NBA Team
^{+}	Denotes player who has been selected for at least one All-Star Game
^{x}	Denotes player who has been selected for at least one All-NBA Team
^{#}	Denotes player who has never appeared in an NBA regular-season or playoff game
^{~}	Denotes player who has been selected as Rookie of the Year

Round	Pick	Player	Position	Nationality (Note: Nationality indicates the player's national team or representative nationality. If a player has not competed at the international level, then the nationality indicates the national team which the player is eligible to represent according to FIBA rules.)	Team	School/club team
1	1	Andrew Bogut^{x}	C	Australia	Milwaukee Bucks	Utah (So.)
1	2	Marvin Williams	F	United States	Atlanta Hawks	North Carolina (Fr.)
1	3	Deron Williams*	PG	United States	Utah Jazz (from Portland)^{[f]}	Illinois (Jr.)
1	4	Chris Paul^{*~}	PG	United States	New Orleans Hornets	Wake Forest (So.)
1	5	Raymond Felton	PG	United States	Charlotte Bobcats	North Carolina (Jr.)
1	6	Martell Webster	G/F	United States	Portland Trail Blazers (from Utah)^{[f]}	Seattle Prep. School (Seattle)
1	7	Charlie Villanueva	F	United States; Dominican Republic	Toronto Raptors	Connecticut (So.)
1	8	Channing Frye	C	United States	New York Knicks	Arizona (Sr.)
1	9	Ike Diogu	F	Nigeria	Golden State Warriors	Arizona State (Jr.)
1	10	Andrew Bynum*	C	United States	Los Angeles Lakers	St. Joseph HS (Metuchen, New Jersey)
1	11	Fran Vázquez^{#}	F/C	Spain	Orlando Magic	Unicaja Málaga (Spain)
1	12	Yaroslav Korolev	F	Russia	Los Angeles Clippers	CSKA Moscow (Russia)
1	13	Sean May	F	United States	Charlotte Bobcats (from Cleveland via Phoenix)^{[g]}	North Carolina (Jr.)
1	14	Rashad McCants	G	United States	Minnesota Timberwolves	North Carolina (Jr.)
1	15	Antoine Wright	G/F	United States	New Jersey Nets	Texas A&M (Jr.)
1	16	Joey Graham	F	United States	Toronto Raptors (from Philadelphia via Denver and New Jersey)^{[h]}	Oklahoma State (Sr.)
1	17	Danny Granger^{+}	SF	United States	Indiana Pacers	New Mexico (Sr.)
1	18	Gerald Green	G/F	United States	Boston Celtics	Gulf Shores Academy (Houston, Texas)
1	19	Hakim Warrick	F	United States	Memphis Grizzlies	Syracuse (Sr.)
1	20	Julius Hodge	G	Antigua and Barbuda	Denver Nuggets (from Washington via Orlando)^{[i]}	NC State (Sr.)
1	21	Nate Robinson	G	United States	Phoenix Suns (from Chicago, traded to New York)^{[j]}^{[a]}	Washington (Jr.)
1	22	Jarrett Jack	G	United States	Denver Nuggets (traded to Portland)^{[b]}	Georgia Tech (Jr.)
1	23	Francisco García	G/F	Dominican Republic	Sacramento Kings	Louisville (Jr.)
1	24	Luther Head	G	United States	Houston Rockets	Illinois (Sr.)
1	25	Johan Petro	C	France	Seattle SuperSonics	Pau-Orthez (France)
1	26	Jason Maxiell	F	United States	Detroit Pistons	Cincinnati (Sr.)
1	27	Linas Kleiza	F	Lithuania	Portland Trail Blazers (from Dallas via Utah, traded to Denver)^{[f]}^{[b]}	Missouri (So.)
1	28	Ian Mahinmi	F/C	France	San Antonio Spurs	Le Havre (France)
1	29	Wayne Simien	F	United States	Miami Heat	Kansas (Sr.)
1	30	David Lee^{*}	PF	United States	New York Knicks (from Phoenix via San Antonio)^{[k]}	Florida (Sr.)
2	31	Salim Stoudamire	G	United States	Atlanta Hawks	Arizona (Sr.)
2	32	Daniel Ewing	G	United States	Los Angeles Clippers (from Charlotte)^{[l]}	Duke (Sr.)
2	33	Brandon Bass	F	United States	New Orleans Hornets	LSU (So.)
2	34	C. J. Miles	G	United States	Utah Jazz	Skyline HS (Dallas)
2	35	Ricky Sánchez^{#}	F	Puerto Rico	Portland Trail Blazers (traded to Denver)^{[b]}	IMG Academy (Bradenton, Florida)
2	36	Ersan İlyasova	F	Turkey	Milwaukee Bucks	Ülkerspor (Turkey)
2	37	Ronny Turiaf	F	France	Los Angeles Lakers (from New York via Atlanta and Charlotte)^{[m]}	Gonzaga (Sr.)
2	38	Travis Diener	G	United States; Italy	Orlando Magic (from Toronto)^{[n]}	Marquette (Sr.)
2	39	Von Wafer	G	United States	Los Angeles Lakers	Florida State (So.)
2	40	Monta Ellis	SG	United States	Golden State Warriors	Lanier HS (Jackson, Mississippi)
2	41	Roko Ukić	G	Croatia	Toronto Raptors (from Orlando)^{[n]}	KK Split (Croatia)
2	42	Chris Taft	F	United States	Golden State Warriors (from L.A. Clippers via New Jersey)^{[o]}	Pittsburgh (So.)
2	43	Mile Ilić	C	Serbia and Montenegro	New Jersey Nets	KK Reflex (Serbia and Montenegro)
2	44	Martynas Andriuškevičius	C	Lithuania	Orlando Magic (from Cleveland, traded to Cleveland)^{[p]}^{[c]}	Žalgiris Kaunas (Lithuania)
2	45	Lou Williams	SG	United States	Philadelphia 76ers	South Gwinnett HS (Snellville, Georgia)
2	46	Erazem Lorbek^{#}	F	Slovenia	Indiana Pacers	Climamio Bologna (Italy)
2	47	Bracey Wright	G	United States	Minnesota Timberwolves	Indiana (Jr.)
2	48	Mickaël Gelabale	F	France	Seattle SuperSonics (from Memphis)^{[q]}	Real Madrid (Spain)
2	49	Andray Blatche	F	Philippines	Washington Wizards	South Kent School (South Kent, Connecticut)
2	50	Ryan Gomes	F	United States	Boston Celtics	Providence (Sr.)
2	51	Robert Whaley	C	United States	Utah Jazz (from Chicago via Houston)^{[r]}	Walsh (Sr.)
2	52	Axel Hervelle^{#}	F	Belgium	Denver Nuggets	Real Madrid (Spain)
2	53	Orien Greene	G	United States	Boston Celtics (from Sacramento)^{[s]}	Louisiana-Lafayette (Sr.)
2	54	Dijon Thompson	G/F	United States	New York Knicks (from Houston, traded to Phoenix)^{[t]}^{[a]}	UCLA (Sr.)
2	55	Lawrence Roberts	F	United States	Seattle SuperSonics (traded to Memphis)^{[d]}	Mississippi State (Sr.)
2	56	Amir Johnson	F	United States	Detroit Pistons	Westchester HS (Los Angeles)
2	57	Marcin Gortat	F/C	Poland	Phoenix Suns (from Dallas via New Orleans, traded to Orlando)^{[u]}^{[e]}	RheinEnergie Köln (Germany)
2	58	Uroš Slokar	F	Slovenia	Toronto Raptors (from Miami)^{[v]}	Snaidero Udine (Italy)
2	59	Cenk Akyol^{#}	G	Turkey	Atlanta Hawks (from San Antonio)^{[w]}	Efes Pilsen (Turkey)
2	60	Alex Acker	G	United States	Detroit Pistons (from Phoenix via Utah and Philadelphia)	Pepperdine (Jr.)

== Notable undrafted players ==
These players who declared or were automatically eligible for the 2005 draft were not selected but have played in the NBA.

Player	Position	Nationality	School/club team
Lance Allred	PF/C	United States; Mexico	Weber State (Sr.)
Alan Anderson	G-F	United States	Michigan State (Sr.)
Kelenna Azubuike	G-F	United States	Kentucky (Jr.)
Eddie Basden	G	United States	Charlotte (Sr.)
Esteban Batista	F-C	Uruguay	Trouville (Uruguay)
Will Bynum	G	United States	Georgia Tech (Sr.)
Will Conroy	PG	United States	Washington (Sr.)
Yakhouba Diawara	SG/SF	France	Pepperdine (Sr.)
Sharrod Ford	F-C	United States	Clemson (Sr.)
Deng Gai	F	Sudan	Fairfield (Sr.)
Stephen Graham	G	United States	Oklahoma State (Sr.)
Devin Green	G	United States	Hampton (Sr.)
Mike Harris	SF	United States	Rice (Sr.)
Chuck Hayes	C-F	United States	Kentucky (Sr.)
Marcelo Huertas	G	Brazil	Joventut Badalona (Spain)
Dwayne Jones	C-F	United States	Saint Joseph's (Jr.)
Keith Langford	G	United States	Kansas (Sr.)
John Lucas III	G	United States	Oklahoma State (Sr.)
Rawle Marshall	SF	Guyana; United States	Oakland (Sr.)
Ivan McFarlin	PF	United States	Oklahoma State (Sr.)
Aaron Miles	G	United States	Kansas (Sr.)
Randolph Morris	C	United States	Kentucky (Fr.)
Andre Owens	G	United States	Houston (Sr.)
Kevinn Pinkney	C	United States	Nevada (Sr.)
Roger Powell	SF	United States	Illinois (Sr.)
Ronnie Price	G	United States	Utah Valley State (Sr.)
Shavlik Randolph	F	United States	Duke (Jr.)
Anthony Roberson	G	United States	Florida (Jr.)
Luke Schenscher	C	Australia	Georgia Tech (Sr.)
Donell Taylor	G	United States	UAB (Sr.)
Matt Walsh	G-F	United States	Florida (Jr.)
Jawad Williams	F	United States	North Carolina (Sr.)

== Trades involving draft picks ==
=== Pre-draft trades ===
Prior to the draft, the following trades were made and resulted in exchanges of draft picks between the teams.

- ^{f} Hours before the start of the draft, Utah acquired the 3rd pick from Portland in exchange for the 6th pick, the 27th pick and a 2006 first-round draft pick. Previously, Utah acquired a 2005 first-round draft pick on June 24, 2004, from Dallas in exchange for the draft rights to Pavel Podkolzine. Utah used the 3rd pick to draft Deron Williams and Portland used the 6th and the 27th pick to draft Martell Webster and Linas Kleiza.
- ^{g} On June 22, 2004, Charlotte acquired Cleveland's first-round draft pick from Phoenix in exchange for an agreement to select Jahidi White in the 2004 Expansion Draft. Previously, Phoenix acquired a 2005 first-round draft pick on October 1, 1997, from Cleveland in a three-team trade with Cleveland and Denver. Charlotte used the 13th pick to draft Sean May
- ^{h} On December 17, 2004, Toronto acquired Philadelphia's 2005 and Denver's 2006 first-round draft picks, Alonzo Mourning, Eric Williams, Aaron Williams from New Jersey in exchange for Vince Carter. Previously, New Jersey acquired Philadelphia's 2005, Denver's 2006 and L.A. Clippers' 2006 first-round draft picks on July 15, 2004, from Denver in exchange for Kenyon Martin. Previously, Denver acquired a 2005 first-round draft pick, Mark Bryant and Art Long from Philadelphia in a three-team trade with Philadelphia and Houston on December 18, 2002. Toronto used the 16th pick to draft Joey Graham.
- ^{i} On June 24, 2004, Denver acquired Washington's first-round draft pick from Orlando in exchange for the draft rights to Jameer Nelson. Previously, Orlando acquired a 2005 first-round draft pick and Laron Profit on August 1, 2001, from Washington in exchange for Brendan Haywood. Denver used the 20th pick to draft Julius Hodge.
- ^{j} On June 24, 2004, Phoenix acquired a 2005 first-round draft pick, the draft rights to Jackson Vroman and cash considerations from Chicago in exchange for the draft rights to Luol Deng. Phoenix used the 21st pick to draft Nate Robinson.
- ^{k} On February 25, 2005, New York acquired Phoenix's 2005 and San Antonio's 2006 first-round draft picks and Malik Rose from San Antonio in exchange for Nazr Mohammed and Jamison Brewer. Previously, San Antonio acquired a 2005 first-round draft pick on June 26, 2003, from Phoenix in exchange for the draft rights to Leandro Barbosa. New York used the 30th pick to draft David Lee.
- ^{l} On July 14, 2005, the L.A. Clippers acquired 2005 and 2006 second-round draft picks from Charlotte in exchange for Eddie House and Melvin Ely. The L.A. Clippers used the 32nd pick to draft Daniel Ewing.
- ^{m} On December 6, 2004, the L.A. Lakers acquired New York's 2005 and Charlotte's 2009 second-round draft picks from Charlotte in exchange for Kareem Rush. Previously, Charlotte acquired New York's second-round draft pick on August 6, 2004, from Atlanta in exchange for Predrag Drobnjak. Previously, Atlanta acquired a 2005 second-round draft pick and Michael Doleac on February 15, 2004, from New York in a three-team trade with New York and Milwaukee. The L.A. Lakers used the 37th pick to draft Ronny Turiaf.
- ^{n} On January 2, 2004, Orlando acquired an option to exchange 2005 second-round draft picks, Mengke Bateer and the draft rights to Remon van de Hare from Toronto in exchange for Robert Archibald. The options to exchange 2005 second-round draft picks were exercised, hence Orlando acquired Toronto's second-round draft pick and Toronto acquired Orlando's second-round draft pick. Orlando used the 38th pick to draft Travis Diener and Toronto used the 41st pick to draft Roko Ukić.
- ^{o} On February 14, 2005, Golden State acquired L.A. Clippers' 2005 and Golden State's 2007 second-round draft picks from New Jersey in exchange for Clifford Robinson. Golden State used the 46th Previously, New Jersey acquired a 2005 second-round draft pick on July 29, 2004, from the L.A. Clippers in exchange for Kerry Kittles and cash considerations. Golden State used the 42nd pick to draft Chris Taft.
- ^{p} On July 23, 2004, Orlando acquired 2005 and 2007 second-round draft picks and Tony Battie from Cleveland in exchange for Drew Gooden, Steven Hunter and Anderson Varejão. Houston used the 44th pick to draft Martynas Andriuškevičius.
- ^{q} On June 24, 2004, Seattle acquired a 2005 second-round draft pick and cash considerations from Memphis in exchange for the draft rights to Andre Emmett. Seattle used the 48th pick to draft Mickaël Gelabale.
- ^{r} On September 30, 2003, Utah acquired Houston's 2004 first-round draft pick, Chicago's 2005 and 2006 second-round draft picks, Glen Rice and cash considerations from Houston in exchange for John Amaechi and Sacramento's 2004 second-round draft pick. Previously, Houston acquired 2005 and 2006 second-round draft picks on September 28, 2000, from Chicago in exchange for Bryce Drew. Utah used the 51st pick to draft Robert Whaley.
- ^{s} On June 23, 2003, Boston acquired the 56th pick in 2003 and a 2005 second-round draft pick from Sacramento in exchange for the draft rights to Darius Songaila. Boston used the 53rd pick to draft Orien Greene.
- ^{t} On June 11, 2003, New York acquired a 2005 second round draft pick from Houston as part of the hiring of Jeff Van Gundy as Houston's head coach. New York used the 54th pick to draft Dijon Thompson.
- ^{u} On January 21, 2005, Phoenix acquired Dallas' 2005 second-round draft pick and Jim Jackson from New Orleans in exchange for Casey Jacobsen, Maciej Lampe and Jackson Vroman. Previously, New Orleans acquired a 2005 second-round draft pick and Dan Dickau on December 3, 2004, from Dallas in exchange for Darrell Armstrong. Phoenix used the 57th pick to draft Marcin Gortat.
- ^{v} On June 24, 2004, Toronto acquired a 2005 second-round draft pick and the draft rights to Pape Sow from Miami in exchange for the draft rights to Albert Miralles. Toronto used the 58th pick to draft Uroš Slokar.
- ^{w} On June 24, 2004, Atlanta acquired a 2005 second-round draft pick and cash considerations from San Antonio in exchange for the draft rights to Viktor Sanikidze. Atlanta used the 59th pick to draft Cenk Akyol.

=== Draft-day trades ===
The following trades involving drafted players were made on the day of the draft:

- ^{a} New York acquired the draft rights to 21st pick Nate Robinson, Quentin Richardson and cash considerations from Phoenix in exchange for the draft rights to 54th pick Dijon Thompson and Kurt Thomas.
- ^{b} Portland acquired the draft rights to 22nd pick Jarrett Jack from Denver in exchange for the draft rights to 27th pick Linas Kleiza and the draft rights to 35th pick Ricky Sanchez.
- ^{c} Cleveland acquired the draft rights to 44th pick Martynas Andriuškevičius from Orlando in exchange for a 2006 second-round draft pick.
- ^{d} Memphis acquired the draft rights to 55th pick Lawrence Roberts from Seattle in exchange for 2006 and 2007 second-round draft picks and cash considerations.
- ^{e} Orlando acquired the draft rights to 57th pick Marcin Gortat from Phoenix in exchange for cash considerations.

== Early entrants ==
=== College underclassmen ===
This year marked the first time in NBA draft history that over 100 underclassmen would declare their initial entry into the NBA draft with 108 total players doing so. However, 49 of these players that were either in college, high school, or overseas play at the time would withdraw from the draft, leaving a total of 59 underclassmen officially declaring their entry into this year's draft. The following college basketball players successfully applied for early draft entrance.

- (United States) Alex Acker – G, Pepperdine (junior)
- (Nigeria) Deji Akindele – C, Chicago State (sophomore)
- (Nigeria) / (United States) Kelenna Azubuike – G, Kentucky (junior)
- (United States) Sean Banks – F, Memphis (sophomore)
- (United States) Brandon Bass – F, LSU (sophomore)
- (United States) Jermaine Bell – F, Indian Hills CC (freshman)
- (Australia) Andrew Bogut – C, Utah (sophomore)
- (United States) Ike Diogu – F, Arizona State (junior)
- (Canada) Olu Famutimi – G, Arkansas (sophomore)
- (United States) Raymond Felton – G, North Carolina (junior)
- (Brazil) Anderson Ferreira – F, Chipola JC (sophomore)
- (Dominican Republic) Francisco García – G, Louisville (junior)
- (United States) John Gilchrist – G, Maryland (junior)
- (United States) Jarrett Jack – G, Georgia Tech (junior)
- (United States) Dwayne Jones – St. Joseph's (junior)
- (South Korea) Brian Kim – G, Vanguard (junior)
- (Lithuania) Linas Kleiza – F, Missouri (sophomore)
- (United States) Julius Lamptey – C, Garden City CC (freshman)
- (United States) Darshan Luckey – G, Saint Francis (PA)
- (United States) Sean May – F, North Carolina (junior)
- (United States) Rashad McCants – G, North Carolina (junior)
- (United States) J. R. Morris – G, Seton Hall (junior)
- (United States) Randolph Morris – F/C, Kentucky (freshman)
- (United States) Chris Paul – G, Wake Forest (sophomore)
- (United States) Pierre Pierce – G, Iowa (junior)
- (United States) Shavlik Randolph – F, Duke (junior)
- (United States) Anthony Roberson – G, Florida (junior)
- (United States) Nate Robinson – G, Washington (junior)
- (The Bahamas) Ray Rose – G, Olivet Nazarene (junior)
- (United States) Chris Taft – F, Pittsburgh (sophomore)
- (United States) Charlie Villanueva – F, Connecticut (sophomore)
- (United States) Tiras Wade – F/G, Louisiana (junior)
- (United States) Von Wafer – G, Florida State (sophomore)
- (United States) Matt Walsh – G, Florida (junior)
- (United States) Deron Williams – G, Illinois (junior)
- (United States) Marvin Williams – F, North Carolina (freshman)
- (United States) Kennedy Winston – G, Alabama (junior)
- (United States) Antoine Wright – G/F, Texas A&M (junior)
- (United States) Bracey Wright – G, Indiana (junior)

=== High school players ===
This would be the eleventh straight year in a row where at least one high school player would declare their entry into the NBA draft directly out of high school after previously only allowing it one time back in 1975. It would also be the last year that the NBA would officially allow for high school players to declare entry into the NBA draft directly out of high school. This year saw the highest amount of high schoolers entering the NBA draft with eleven total players officially entering, with Martellus Bennett, Keith Brumbaugh, and Brandon Rush each initially declaring their interest in joining the NBA draft, but ultimately withdrawing to instead spend some time in college going forward. This year also would see the youngest player being taken in NBA history with Andrew Bynum being selected at 17 years old and playing his first NBA game only 6 days after he turned 18 years old. The following high school players successfully applied for early draft entrance.

- (United States) Andray Blatche – F, South Kent School (South Kent, Connecticut)
- (United States) Curtis Brown Jr. – F, Mount Olive Prep (East Point, Georgia)
- (United States) Andrew Bynum – C, St. Joseph HS (Metuchen, New Jersey)
- (United States) Monta Ellis – G, Lanier HS (Jackson, Mississippi)
- (United States) Gerald Green – G/F, Gulf Shores Academy (Houston, Texas)
- (United States) Amir Johnson – F, Westchester HS (Los Angeles, California)
- (United States) Kyle Luckett – F, South Side HS (Fort Wayne, Indiana)
- (United States) C. J. Miles – G, Skyline (Dallas, Texas)
- (Puerto Rico) Ricky Sánchez – F, IMG Academy (Bradenton, Florida)
- (United States) Martell Webster – F/G, Seattle Prep (Seattle, Washington)
- (United States) Lou Williams – G, South Gwinnett HS (Snellville, Georgia)

=== International players ===
The following international players successfully applied for early draft entrance.

- Cenk Akyol – G, Efes Pilsen (Turkey)
- Martynas Andriuškevičius – F/C, Žalgiris Kaunas (Lithuania)
- (Poland) Marcin Gortat – C, RheinEnergie Köln (Germany)
- Mile Ilić – C, KK Reflex (Serbia and Montenegro)
- Ersan İlyasova – F, Ülkerspor (Turkey)
- Yaroslav Korolev – F, CSKA Moscow (Russia)
- (Slovenia) Erazem Lorbek – F, Climamio Bologna (Italy)
- Ian Mahinmi – F, Le Havre (France)
- Drago Pašalić – F, KK Split (Croatia)
- Johan Petro – C, Pau-Orthez (France)
- Roko Ukić – G, KK Split (Croatia)

== Invited attendees ==
The 2005 NBA draft is considered to be the 27th NBA draft to have utilized what is properly considered the "green room" experience for NBA prospects. The NBA's green room is a staging area where anticipated draftees often sit with their families and representatives, waiting for their names to be called on draft night. Often being positioned either in front of or to the side of the podium (in this case, being positioned somewhere within The Theater at Madison Square Garden), once a player heard his name, he would walk to the podium to shake hands and take promotional photos with the NBA commissioner. From there, the players often conducted interviews with various media outlets while backstage. From there, the players often conducted interviews with various media outlets while backstage. However, once the NBA draft started to air nationally on TV starting with the 1980 NBA draft, the green room evolved from players waiting to hear their name called and then shaking hands with these select players who were often called to the hotel to take promotional pictures with the NBA commissioner a day or two after the draft concluded to having players in real-time waiting to hear their names called up and then shaking hands with David Stern, the NBA's commissioner at the time.

The NBA compiled its list of green room invites through collective voting by the NBA's team presidents and general managers alike, which in this year's case belonged to only what they believed were the top 16 prospects at the time. Despite the higher amount of invites for this year's draft when compared to the previous year's draft, there would still be some notable discrepancies involved with the invitations at hand between the missing invitations for #9 pick Ike Diogu, #10 pick Luke Jackson, and #16 pick Joey Graham for a perfect invite listing alongside the missing invite for future All-Star and All-NBA Team member David Lee for good measure. With all of that in mind, the following players were invited to attend this year's draft festivities live and in person.

- (Australia) Andrew Bogut – C, Utah
- (United States) Raymond Felton – PG, North Carolina
- (United States) Channing Frye – PF/C, Arizona
- (United States) Danny Granger – SF, New Mexico
- (United States) Gerald Green – SG/SF, Gulf Shores Academy (Houston, Texas)
- Yaroslav Korolev – SF/PF, PBC CSKA Moscow (Russia)
- (United States) Sean May – PF, North Carolina
- (United States) Rashad McCants – SG, North Carolina
- (United States) Chris Paul – PG, Wake Forest
- Fran Vázquez – PF/C, Unicaja Málaga (Spain)
- (United States) / (Dominican Republic) Charlie Villanueva – PF, Connecticut
- (United States) Hakim Warrick – PF, Syracuse
- (United States) Martell Webster – SG/SF, Seattle Preparatory School (Seattle, Washington)
- (United States) Deron Williams – PG, Illinois
- (United States) Marvin Williams – SF/PF, North Carolina
- (United States) Antoine Wright – SG/SF, Texas A&M

== See also ==
- List of first overall NBA draft picks
