= Daniel Ewing =

American basketball player (born 1983)

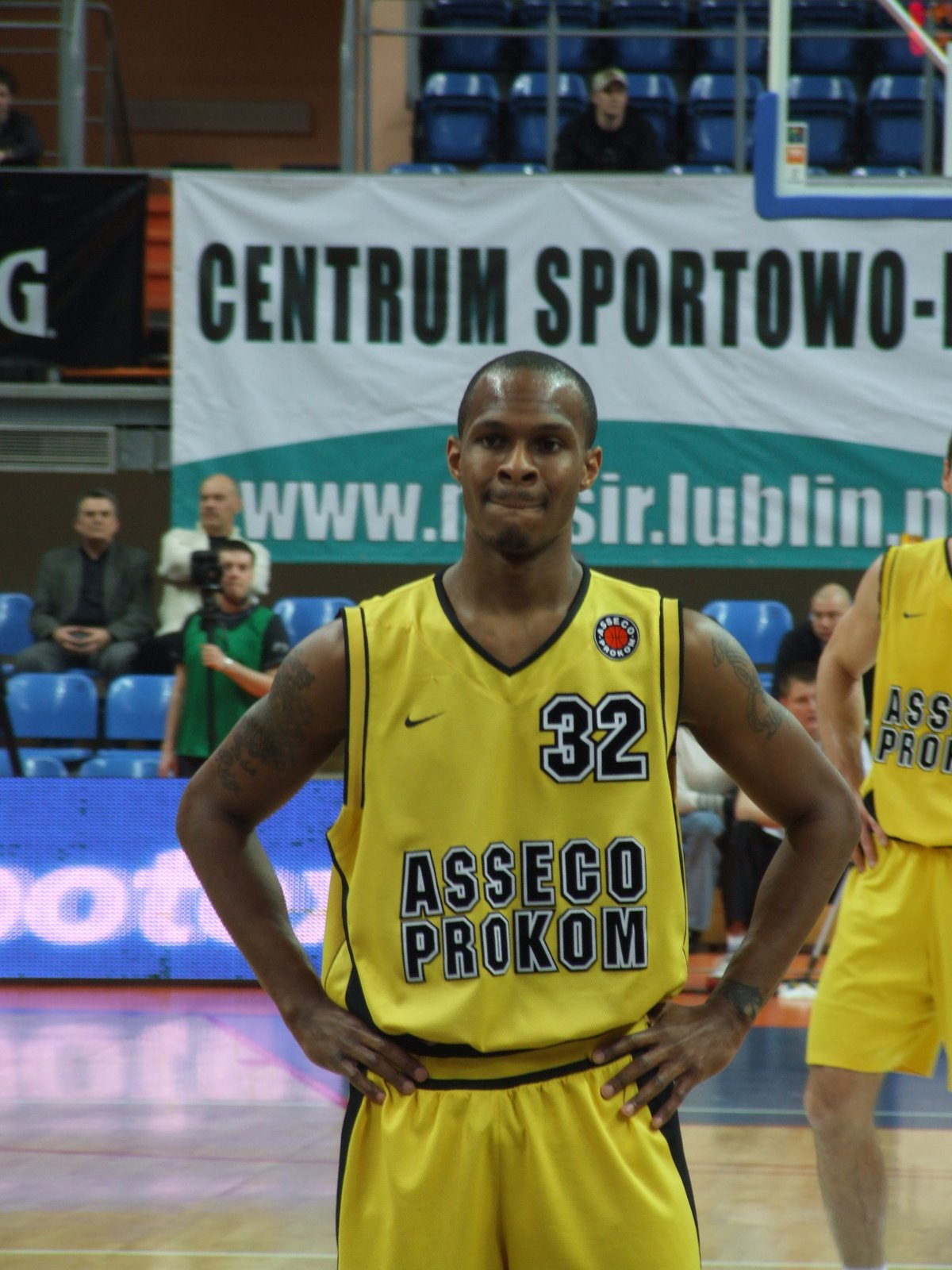
- Ewing with Asseco Prokom in 2009

Personal information
- Born: March 26, 1983 (age 43) Milton, Florida, U.S.
- Listed height: 6 ft 3 in (1.91 m)
- Listed weight: 185 lb (84 kg)

Career information
- High school: Willowridge (Houston, Texas)
- College: Duke (2001–2005)
- NBA draft: 2005: 2nd round, 32nd overall pick
- Drafted by: Los Angeles Clippers
- Playing career: 2005–2019
- Position: Shooting guard / point guard

Career history
- 2005–2007: Los Angeles Clippers
- 2007–2008: Khimki
- 2008–2011: Asseco Prokom Gdynia
- 2011–2012: Azovmash Mariupol
- 2012–2013: Beşiktaş
- 2013–2014: Paris-Levallois
- 2014–2015: Le Mans Sarthe
- 2015–2016: Neptūnas Klaipėda
- 2016–2017: Maccabi Ashdod
- 2017: Neptūnas Klaipėda
- 2018: Ferro Carril Oeste
- 2019: CSU Sibiu

Career highlights
- All-LKL Team (2016); LKL Best Foreign Player (2016); 3× Polish League champion (2009–2011); Polish League Finals MVP (2011); Russian Cup winner (2008); Third-team All-ACC (2005); ACC tournament MVP (2003); Texas Mr. Basketball (2001); McDonald's All-American (2001)
- Stats at NBA.com
- Stats at Basketball Reference

George Daniel Ewing Jr. (born March 26, 1983) is an American former professional basketball player. He currently works as a scout for the Los Angeles Lakers.

== College career ==
A 6 ft 3 in (1.91 m) guard from Duke University, Ewing played for four seasons at the college under coach Mike Krzyzewski from 2001 to 2005. Prior to Duke, he played for Willowridge High School in Missouri City, Texas along with T. J. Ford and Ivan McFarlin. He was selected as a McDonald's All-American in 2001.

== Professional career ==
=== NBA ===
Ewing was selected by the NBA's Los Angeles Clippers in the second round (32nd overall) of the 2005 NBA draft. He played with the club during two seasons, as a backup. In 127 regular season contests, he averaged 3 points, one rebound and one assist per game. On June 29, 2007, he was waived by the Clippers.

=== Europe ===
On July 23, 2007, Ewing signed a two-year contract with the Russian League club BC Khimki. After one year in Russia with Khimki, Ewing joined Polish League's Asseco Prokom Sopot for the 2008–09 season and remained with the team until 2011.

In July 2011, he signed a one-year contract with Azovmash Mariupol of Ukraine. In December 2012, he signed with Beşiktaş of the Turkish Basketball League for the rest of the season.

In July 2013, he signed with a one-year deal Paris-Levallois Basket of the French LNB Pro A. On October 1, 2014, Ewing signed a six-week contract with Le Mans Sarthe. On October 29, 2014, his contract with the team was extended for the rest of the season.

On August 15, 2015, Ewing signed a one-year deal with the Lithuanian club Neptūnas Klaipėda.

On August 18, 2016, Ewing signed with Israeli club Maccabi Ashdod. On February 22, 2017, he returned to Neptūnas.
