= Flint Northern High School =

Closed public high school in Flint, Michigan, U.S.

Location
- G-3284 Mackin Road; Flint, Michigan 48504; United States; 43.0356°N 83.7374°W

Information
- School type: Public secondary Jr. High
- Motto: "Respect, Responsibility, and Results"
- Opened: 1928
- Closed: 2013 (Reopened as Northern Academy and closed again soon after)
- School district: Flint Community Schools
- Superintendent: Linda Thompson
- CEEB code: 231500
- Principal: Janice Davis
- Grades: 7–12
- Gender: Co-ed
- Colors: scarlet gray
- Slogan: We Are The Vikings
- Athletics conference: Saginaw Valley HS Ass'n
- Team name: Vikings
- Accreditation: North Central Association of Colleges and Schools

Flint Northern High School was a public secondary school located in Flint, Michigan, United States. The original building "#1" was built in 1928 and demolished in the 1980s, after being the home of the Flint Academy. It was one of the high schools in the Flint Community Schools district along with Flint Northwestern High School (now Flint Junior High School) and Flint Southwestern Academy. It was closed in 2013 and reopened as Northern Academy. The Flint school board finally closed the school completely in 2014. Today, it sits abandoned and in ruins.

== Athletics ==
Its teams were the Vikings. The school competed in the Saginaw Valley High School Association and the Michigan High School Athletic Association (MHSAA).

The following teams have won their respective MHSAA state championships.

- Basketball (boys): 1932–33, 35–36, 38–39, 39–40, 46–47, 70–71, 71–72, 77–78, 94-95
- Basketball (girls): 1978–79, 79–80, 80–81, 81–82, 94–95, 95-96
- Cross Country (boys): 1974-75
- Cross Country (girls): 1981-82
- Tennis (boys): 1930-31
- Track & Field (boys): 1949–50, 52–53, 60–61, 62–63, 75–76, 78-79
- Track & Field (girls): 1978–79, 79–80, 80–81, 82-83
- Wrestling: 1962–63, 94-95

== Notable alumni ==
- Leroy Bolden is a former professional football running back
- Steve Boros - professional baseball player and manager
- Wayman Britt is a former professional basketball player.
- Bunyan Bryant, Professor Emeritus at the University of Michigan
- J'Nathan Bullock is a former professional basketball player.
- Gregory Burks is a former professional basketball player
- Tony Burton is a former boxer and actor, best known for his work in the Rocky series of films.
- Mateen Cleaves was a professional basketball player.
- Robert Garth, AFL2 former professional football player
- Dan Kildee, member of the U.S.Congress
- Tamika Louis, former head coach of the Delaware State University women's basketball team.
- Eugene Marve is a former professional football linebacker.
- Eric Mays was a politician who served in the Flint City Council
- Tawana McDonald is a former professional basketball player
- Mike Miller is a former professional football wide receiver
- Jack Minore was a politician who served in the Flint City Council and the Michigan House of Representatives.
- Sheldon Neeley is a politician who is currently serving as the mayor of Flint
- Deanna Nolan was a professional basketball player, best known for her years with the Detroit Shock.
- Thomas Rawls is a professional football running back for the Seattle Seahawks.
- Robaire Smith is a former professional football defensive end.
- Leo Sugar is a former professional football defensive end.
- Dominic Tomasi was a football player for the University of Michigan.
- Matt Trannon former football player for Michigan State University
- Fred Trosko was a college football coach at Michigan State Normal College (Eastern Michigan University). He also returned to Flint Northern and served as an assistant coach.
- Chris Wilson is a former professional football defensive end.

== See also ==
- Flint Community Schools
  - Flint Southwestern Academy
  - Flint Northwestern
