= Flint Northwestern High School =

Location
- G-2138 West Carpenter Road; Flint, Michigan 48505; United States; 43.076°N 83.720°W

Information
- Type: Public, magnet
- Opened: 1964
- Status: Closed
- Closed: 2018
- School district: Flint Community Schools
- Superintendent: Lawrence E. Watkins, Jr.
- NCES School ID: 261452005114
- Teaching staff: 47
- Grades: 9–12
- Gender: Co-ed
- Enrollment: 524 (2015–16)
- Student to teacher ratio: 16:1
- Campus type: Urban
- Colors: Green and white
- Athletics conference: Saginaw Valley League, MHSAA
- Nickname: Wildcats
- Rival: Flint Southwestern Academy

Flint Northwestern High School was a high school in Flint, Michigan, United States that served grades nine through twelve. It was part of Flint Community Schools and opened in 1964.

In July 2018, the campus was repurposed as Flint Junior High School, which serves grades seven and eight, while its former high school students were relocated to Flint Southwestern Academy.

== History ==
The school first opened in September 1964. After initial construction, the school was dedicated to the Flint Community Schools Board of Education by Claude E. Stout. Further additions to the building were a swimming pool in November 1964 and the Guy V. Houston football stadium in the fall of 1967.

The high school's official mascot was the wildcat. The official school colors were green and white.

In 1999, Flint Community Schools entered into a contract with EdisonLearning, Inc. (formerly known as Edison Schools, Inc.), the country's leading private manager of public schools, in order to improve the school and boost student performance. Flint Northwestern High School became an EdisonLearning partnership school, and its official name became Flint Northwestern-Edison Community High School. In 2005, the contract was not renewed and Flint Community Schools gave the high school its present name: Flint Northwestern Preparatory Academy. The district officially closed the school ahead of the 2018–2019 school year. In July 2018, Flint Community Schools opened the district's first junior high school at the site.

== Academics ==
Flint Northwestern Academy was a state and nationally accredited school through the AdvancED/North Central Accreditation of Colleges and Schools.

== Demographics ==
Flint Northwestern High School profile 2013/2014:

Grade	Students
9	249
10	159
11	134
12	87
Ungraded	0
TOTAL	629

Male	Female
53%	47%

Enrollment	(% of total)
Total Minority	94%
American Indian/Alaskan Native	0.3%
Asian	0%
Black	89%
Hawaiian Native/Pacific Islander	0%
Hispanic	2%
White	6%
Two or more races	3%

== Athletics ==
=== Boys' basketball ===
- 1975 Class A State Runner-up
- 1984 Class A State Champion
- 1985 Class A State Champion
- 1988 Class A State Runner-up

=== Boys' track and field ===
- 1975 Class A State Runner-up

=== Girls' basketball ===
- 1983 Class A State Champion
- 1984 Class A State Champion
- 1985 Class A State Runner-up
- 1992 Class A State Runner-up
- 1993 Class A State Champion

=== Fall sports ===
- Football
- Volleyball
- Cross country (boys' and girls')
- Boys' soccer
- Boys' tennis
- Girls' golf

=== Winter sports ===
- Basketball (boys' and girls')
- Bowling (boys' and girls')
- Wrestling

=== Spring sports ===
- Baseball
- Softball
- Track & field (boys' and girls')

== Notable alumni ==
- Mark Clodfelter (class of 1968), politician
- Dennis Johnson (class of 1976), football player
- Trent Tucker (class of 1978), basketball player
- Barry Stevens (class of 1981), basketball player
- Veno Belk (class of 1982), football player
- Mark Ingram Sr. (class of 1983), football player
- Jeff Grayer (class of 1984), basketball player
- Glen Rice (class of 1985), basketball player
- Andre Rison (class of 1985), football player
- Tonya Edwards (class of 1986), basketball player and coach
- Chris Byrd (class of 1988), boxer
- Fernando Smith (class of 1990), football player
- Morris Peterson (class of 1995), basketball player
- Cory Hightower (class of 1998; transferred), basketball player
- Desmon Farmer (class of 2000), basketball player
- Kelvin Torbert (class of 2001), basketball player
- Olu Famutimi (class of 2003), basketball player
- Ian Schneider (class of 2009), director
- Deondre Parks (class of 2012; transferred), basketball player
- Claressa Shields (class of 2013), boxer
- Sparkle Taylor (class of 2013), WNBA player

== See also ==
- Flint Community Schools
  - Flint Central - closed 2009
  - Flint Northern - closed 2013
  - Flint Southwestern Academy
