= Rasual Butler =

American basketball player (1979–2018)

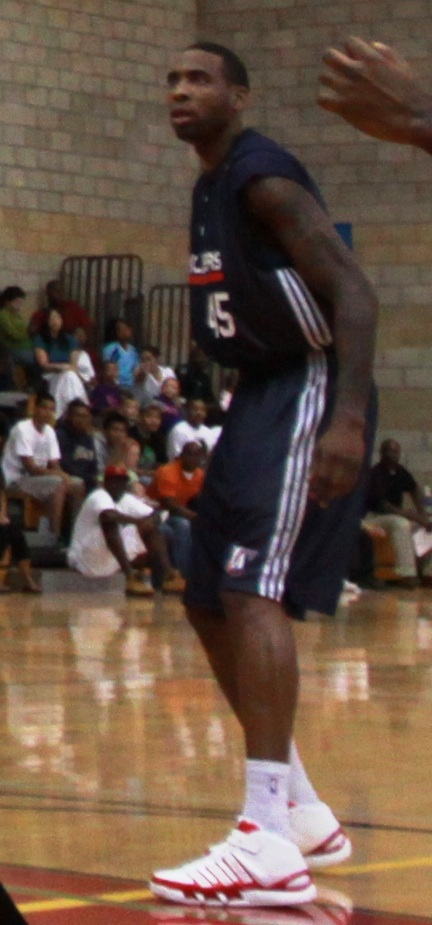
- Butler in 2009

Personal information
- Born: May 23, 1979 Philadelphia, Pennsylvania, U.S.
- Died: January 31, 2018 (aged 38) Los Angeles, California, U.S.
- Listed height: 6 ft 7 in (2.01 m)
- Listed weight: 215 lb (98 kg)

Career information
- High school: Roman Catholic (Philadelphia, Pennsylvania)
- College: La Salle (1998–2002)
- NBA draft: 2002: 2nd round, 53rd overall pick
- Drafted by: Miami Heat
- Playing career: 2002–2016
- Position: Small forward / shooting guard
- Number: 45, 9, 8, 18

Career history
- 2002–2005: Miami Heat
- 2005–2009: New Orleans Hornets (Note: During the 2005–06 and 2006–07 seasons, the team was known as the New Orleans/Oklahoma City Hornets during their temporary relocation to Oklahoma City due to Hurricane Katrina.)
- 2009–2011: Los Angeles Clippers
- 2011: Chicago Bulls
- 2011–2012: Toronto Raptors
- 2012–2013: Tulsa 66ers
- 2013–2014: Indiana Pacers
- 2014–2015: Washington Wizards
- 2015–2016: San Antonio Spurs

Career highlights
- NBA D-League Impact Player of the Year (2013); 2× First-team All-Atlantic 10 (2001, 2002); Third-team Parade All-American (1998)
- Stats at NBA.com
- Stats at Basketball Reference

Rasual Butler (born Felix Rasual Cheeseborough; May 23, 1979 – January 31, 2018) was an American professional basketball player. In his 14-year National Basketball Association (NBA) career, he played for the Miami Heat, New Orleans Hornets, Los Angeles Clippers, Chicago Bulls, Toronto Raptors, Indiana Pacers, Washington Wizards and San Antonio Spurs. Butler was born in Philadelphia, and raised in the Point Breeze area of South Philadelphia. After playing college basketball with the La Salle Explorers, he was drafted in the second round of the 2002 NBA draft by the Heat. On January 31, 2018, Butler was behind the wheel when he and his girlfriend, Leah LaBelle, died in a single vehicle car crash in Los Angeles.

== Early life ==
Butler was born as Felix Rasual Cheeseborough to parents Felix Cheeseborough and Cheryl Taylor. When he was aged eight, his father was murdered on a South Philadelphia street in an unsolved case. Taylor changed her son's name to Rasual Butler using her mother's maiden name so Butler would not be constantly reminded of his father's death.

== College career ==
Butler played his college career with the La Salle Explorers. He became the sixth Explorer to score over 2,000 points, and at the time of his induction into the La Salle University Hall of Athletes, he ranked fourth among the Explorer's all-time scorers (2,125). He was named to First Team All-Atlantic 10 (2001, 2002) and was selected to the Verizon Atlantic 10 Men's Basketball Championship All-Tournament team in 2002. He was inducted into the La Salle Hall of Athletes in 2008.

== Professional career ==
=== Miami Heat (2002–2005) ===
Butler was selected by the Miami Heat with the 53rd pick of the 2002 NBA draft.

=== New Orleans Hornets (2005–2009) ===
After three seasons with the Heat, Butler was traded to the New Orleans Hornets as part of the largest trade in NBA history. The four-team trade involved the Memphis Grizzlies, Miami Heat, Boston Celtics, and Utah Jazz, and featured 13 players, most notably Eddie Jones, Antoine Walker, Jason Williams and James Posey.

During the 2007–08 regular season, Butler averaged 17 minutes of action, 4.9 points and 2 rebounds per game while coming mostly from the bench.

=== Los Angeles Clippers (2009–2011) ===
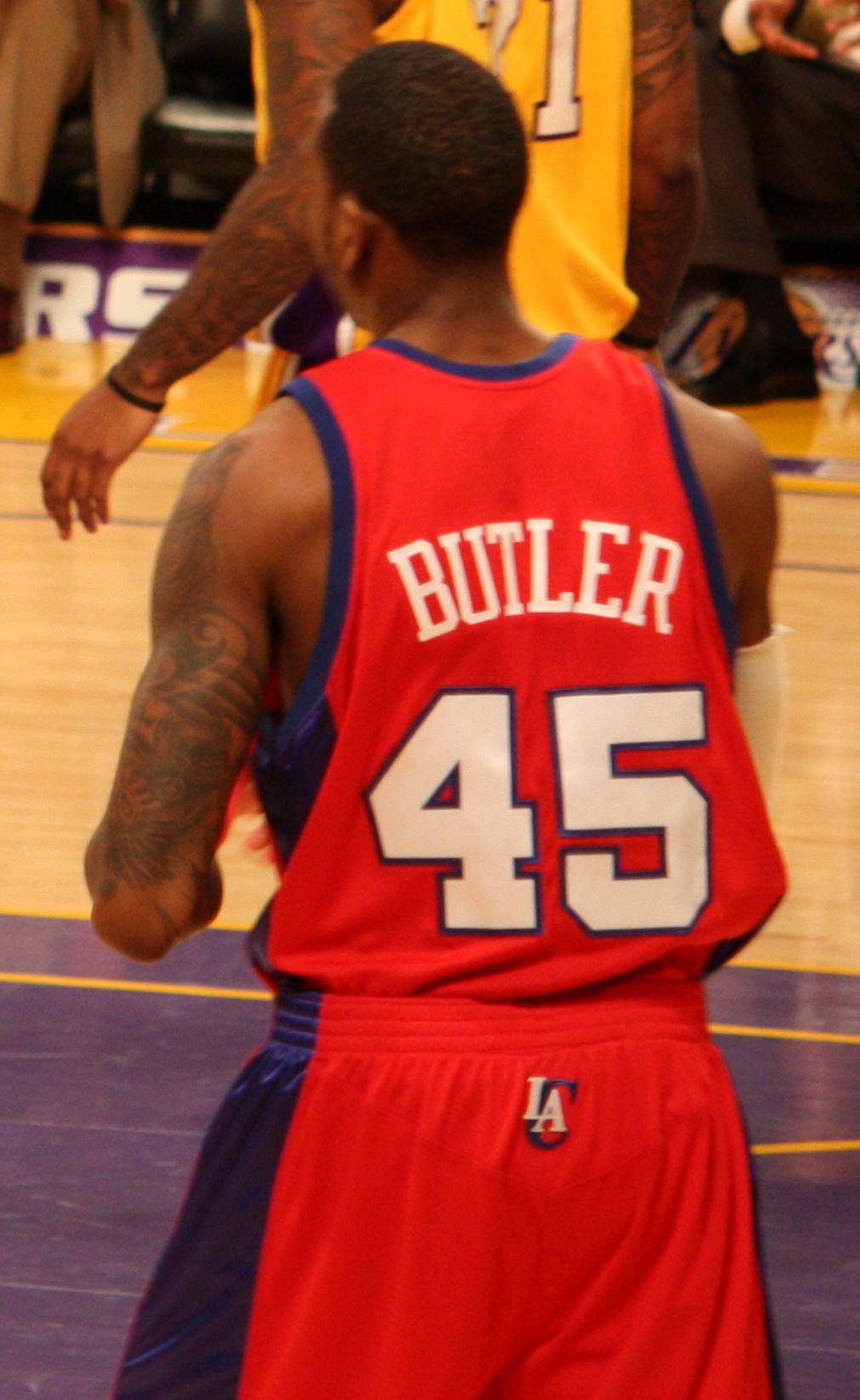
Butler with the Clippers in 2009

On August 12, 2009, the Los Angeles Clippers acquired Butler by trading a conditional 2016 second round draft pick. He was waived by the Clippers on February 28, 2011.

=== Chicago Bulls (2011) ===
Butler signed with the Chicago Bulls on March 3, 2011.

=== Toronto Raptors (2011–2012) ===
In August 2011, Butler signed a one-year contract with CB Gran Canaria. However, he never made an appearance for them on the court.

On December 10, 2011, Butler signed a new contract with the Toronto Raptors. He was waived by the Raptors on March 23, 2012. He averaged 3.2 points, 1.9 rebounds and 13 minutes of action in 34 games.

=== Tulsa 66ers (2013) ===
On January 18, 2013, Butler joined the Tulsa 66ers of the NBA Development League. He was subsequently named the 2013 Impact player of the Year, which is awarded to a player who joined an NBA D-League team midway through the season and made the greatest contribution following his in-season acquisition.

=== Indiana Pacers (2013–2014) ===
On September 27, 2013, Butler signed with the Indiana Pacers. He averaged 2.7 points, 0.8 rebounds and 0.3 assists in 50 games.

=== Washington Wizards (2014–2015) ===
On September 29, 2014, Butler signed with the Washington Wizards. After an impressive preseason and a fractured wrist suffered by Bradley Beal, Butler made the final team prior to the start of the 2014–15 season. Within six regular season games, he was a force off the bench as he cemented a role under coach Randy Wittman.

=== San Antonio Spurs (2015–2016) ===
On September 28, 2015, Butler signed with the San Antonio Spurs.

Butler's final NBA game was played on March 8, 2016, in a 116 - 91 win over the Minnesota Timberwolves where he played for 5 minutes and recorded no stats. The very next day on March 9, 2016, he was waived by the Spurs. He averaged 2.7 points, 1.2 rebounds and 9.4 minutes in 46 games.

On September 26, 2016, Butler signed with the Minnesota Timberwolves, but was waived on October 22 after appearing in five preseason games.

== BIG3 ==
In 2017, Butler was signed by the Ball Hogs to play in the BIG3. During the season, he was traded to the Dallas Power.

== Player profile ==
Butler's outside shooting was considered to be his greatest strength, shooting 36 percent over the course of his career and even 46 percent (50 total) during the 2003–04 season from behind the three-point line. His career-high total were 134 made three-point shots (37 percent) during the 2006–07 NBA season.

== Personal life ==
Butler had one adult daughter, Raven, who he lived with at the time of his death. He starred in Trina's music video "Here We Go". Butler was close friends with fellow NBA player Lamar Odom and was seen in episodes of his television show Khloé & Lamar.

== Death ==
On January 31, 2018, Butler and his partner (initially misidentified as his wife), singer Leah LaBelle, were killed instantly in a high-speed car accident in the Studio City neighborhood of Los Angeles, California, after he lost control of his Range Rover on Ventura Boulevard and crashed violently into a strip mall parking lot. Autopsy reports showed traces of methamphetamine, oxycodone and marijuana in Butler's body, and a blood alcohol content of 0.118%.

== NBA career statistics ==
Legend
GP	Games played	GS	Games started	MPG	Minutes per game
FG%	Field goal percentage	3P%	3-point field goal percentage	FT%	Free throw percentage
RPG	Rebounds per game	APG	Assists per game	SPG	Steals per game
BPG	Blocks per game	PPG	Points per game	**Bold**	Career high
*	Led the league

=== Regular season ===
Year	Team	GP	GS	MPG	FG%	3P%	FT%	RPG	APG	SPG	BPG	PPG
2002–03	Miami	72	28	21.0	.362	.292	.731	2.6	1.3	.3	.6	7.5
2003–04	Miami	45	0	15.0	.476	.463	.762	1.4	.5	.2	.3	6.8
2004–05	Miami	65	15	18.5	.399	.373	.771	2.3	1.0	.3	.4	6.5
2005–06	New Orleans/Oklahoma City	79	20	23.7	.406	.380	.693	2.9	.5	.4	.6	8.7
2006–07	New Orleans/Oklahoma City	81	38	27.4	.398	.369	.644	3.2	.8	.5	.7	10.1
2007–08	New Orleans	51	8	17.2	.350	.331	.839	2.0	.7	.3	.4	4.9
2008–09	New Orleans	**82***	**74**	31.9	.433	.390	.782	**3.3**	.9	**.6**	.7	11.2
2009–10	L.A. Clippers	**82***	64	**33.0**	.409	.336	**.841**	2.9	**1.4**	.4	**.8**	**11.9**
2010–11	L.A. Clippers	41	2	18.1	.323	.326	.667	1.9	.7	.2	.4	5.0
2010–11	Chicago	6	0	4.3	**.545**	**.571**	.000	2.0	.0	.0	.0	2.7
2011–12	Toronto	34	14	13.3	.308	.273	.583	1.9	.6	.2	.1	3.2
2013–14	Indiana	50	2	7.6	.464	.419	.571	.8	.3	.1	.2	2.7
2014–15	Washington	70	1	20.1	.422	.387	.791	2.6	.8	.4	.3	7.7
2015–16	San Antonio	46	0	9.4	.471	.306	.688	1.2	.5	.3	.5	2.7
Career		809	266	21.3	.403	.362	.747	2.4	.8	.4	.5	7.5

=== Playoffs ===
Year	Team	GP	GS	MPG	FG%	3P%	FT%	RPG	APG	SPG	BPG	PPG
2004	Miami	10	0	5.8	.409	.333	.000	1.1	.2	.1	.0	2.1
2005	Miami	**12**	1	15.2	.373	.367	.333	1.5	**.6**	.1	.1	4.7
2009	New Orleans	5	**5**	**31.6**	.459	.526	**1.000**	**3.0**	.2	**.2**	**.8**	**10.6**
2011	Chicago	3	0	2.3	**1.000**	**1.000**	.000	.3	.0	.0	.0	1.0
2014	Indiana	10	0	6.3	.357	.417	**1.000**	.5	.1	.1	.1	1.7
2015	Washington	2	0	3.5	.000	.000	.000	.5	.5	.0	.0	.0
Career		42	6	11.2	.407	.417	.857	1.2	.3	.1	.1	3.5
