= Brian Grant =

American basketball player (born 1972)

Personal information
- Born: March 5, 1972 (age 54) Columbus, Ohio, U.S.
- Listed height: 6 ft 9 in (2.06 m)
- Listed weight: 254 lb (115 kg)

Career information
- High school: Georgetown (Georgetown, Ohio)
- College: Xavier (1990–1994)
- NBA draft: 1994: 1st round, 8th overall pick
- Drafted by: Sacramento Kings
- Playing career: 1994–2006
- Position: Power forward / center
- Number: 33, 44, 55

Career history
- 1994–1997: Sacramento Kings
- 1997–2000: Portland Trail Blazers
- 2000–2004: Miami Heat
- 2004–2005: Los Angeles Lakers
- 2005–2006: Phoenix Suns

Career highlights
- NBA All-Rookie First Team (1995); 2× MCC Player of the Year (1993, 1994); 2× First-team All-MCC (1993, 1994); 2× Second-team All-MCC (1991, 1992); No. 33 retired by Xavier Musketeers

Career NBA statistics
- Points: 7,933 (10.5 ppg)
- Rebounds: 5,622 (7.4 rpg)
- Assists: 923 (1.2 apg)
- Stats at NBA.com
- Stats at Basketball Reference

Brian Wade Grant (born March 5, 1972) is an American former professional basketball player. He played the power forward and center positions for five teams during 12 seasons in the National Basketball Association. He was known for his tenacious rebounding and blue-collar defense. During his career, he played with the Sacramento Kings (where he made First Team All-Rookie in the 1994–95 season), Portland Trail Blazers, Miami Heat, Los Angeles Lakers, and Phoenix Suns.

== Early life ==
Grant grew up in the small, rural community of Georgetown, Ohio, near the Ohio River about 40 miles southeast of Cincinnati. During summers, he spent most of his time working at area farms, cutting, housing, and stripping tobacco, digging potatoes and baling hay. He played basketball at Georgetown High School, mostly in anonymity until Xavier University's basketball office began receiving anonymous calls stating that they should take a look at Grant. Xavier assistant coach Dino Gaudio finally scouted Grant, followed by visits from XU head coach Pete Gillen. Georgetown High's gymnasium has since been renamed Brian Grant Gymnasium.

== College career ==
Grant played basketball at Xavier University. After four seasons at Xavier, Grant was second on the all-time leading scorers' list with 1,719 points. He was twice named Midwest Collegiate Conference Player of the Year. All four seasons at Xavier he led the Musketeers in rebounding, and was third on the all-time leading rebounding list with 1,080. He was named to the Associated Press honorable mention All-American team in his junior year, after ranking second in the nation in field goal percentage with 65.4 percent.

Grant was inducted into the Xavier Athletic Hall of Fame in 1999 and became one of only four basketball players to have his jersey retired, in a ceremony held in 2011.

== Professional career ==
=== Sacramento Kings (1994–1997) ===
Grant was selected in the first round, eighth overall, in the 1994 NBA draft by the Sacramento Kings. In his rookie season he started in 59 out of 80 games, averaging 13.2 points a game with 7.5 rebounds. The following year, he started in 75 out of 78 games, increasing his scoring average to 14.4 points a game as the Kings made the playoffs. The Kings lost in four games to the top-seeded Seattle SuperSonics in the first round, with Grant averaging 9.8 points per game for the series. He signed a five-year, $29 million contract, but due to injuries appeared in only 24 games in the 1996–1997 season, and the Kings did not make the playoffs.

=== Portland Trail Blazers (1997–2000) ===
Grant opted out of the deal following the 1997 season to sign a six-year, $56 million deal with the Portland Trail Blazers. In his first year with the Trail Blazers he started in 49 of 61 games as the team made the playoffs but lost in the first round to the Los Angeles Lakers 3 games to 1. Grant averaged 13.2 points and 10.7 rebounds a game for the series. The 1998–1999 season was shortened to 50 games because of a league lockout, and Grant started 46 of 48 games with a scoring average of 11.5 points a game and a team high 9.8 rebounds per game. The Trail Blazers won the Pacific Division, swept the Phoenix Suns in the first round of the playoffs and defeated the previous Western Conference Champion Utah Jazz in six games in the second round. In the Western Conference Finals, the Trail Blazers were swept by the league-leading San Antonio Spurs. Grant started all 13 playoff games and averaged 13.2 points with 9.2 rebounds.

Prior to the 1999–2000 season, Portland acquired veteran all-star Scottie Pippen, and coach Mike Dunleavy decided to use Grant as a reserve behind rising all-star Rasheed Wallace, who would go on to have a career year during the season as the Trail Blazers won 59 games and the second seed in the Western Conference. Portland opened the playoffs with a 3–1 first-round win over the Minnesota Timberwolves, with Grant and Wallace both being used as defensive options against Kevin Garnett. Grant was used in a similar fashion against Karl Malone and the Utah Jazz in the second round, with Portland advancing in five games. In the Western Conference Finals, the Trail Blazers faced the Los Angeles Lakers led by Pippen's former Chicago Bulls coach Phil Jackson and the duo of Shaquille O'Neal and Kobe Bryant. The teams split the first two games before the Lakers took games 3 and 4 to take a 3–1 series lead, but Portland responded with a win on the road in game 5 and a home win in the sixth game to set up a seventh game with a trip to the NBA Finals on the line. Despite taking a double-digit lead into the fourth quarter, the Lakers rallied and won the game, eliminating Portland. Grant averaged 5.4 points and 5.8 rebounds throughout the 2000 playoff run.

After two years as the starting PF and one year as the Blazers' number one big man off the bench, Grant once again opted out of his deal to become a free agent, hoping to land a starting job elsewhere.

Grant made an appearance (albeit as an in game model) in a memorable Sega Dreamcast commercial in 1999 where he was seen talking to Sonic the Hedgehog character Tails. After the two-tailed fox said to Grant, "Brian, you're going to get roofed.", Grant replied with, "Shut up, quadruped."

=== Miami Heat (2000–2004) ===
In the summer of 2000 Grant signed a 7-year $86 million deal with the Miami Heat, despite coming off season averages of 7.5 ppg and 5.5 rpg. The deal raised eyebrows, but Heat President and GM Pat Riley insisted that Grant was the missing piece to the Heat's championship puzzle, along with other recently acquired players Eddie Jones and Anthony Mason. Weeks before the start of the season Miami's all-star center Alonzo Mourning was diagnosed with a rare kidney disease forcing Riley to play Grant at center despite usually playing at the power forward position. Grant responded by putting up a career season of 15.2 ppg, 8.8 rpg, and a career high 79.7% at the foul line. Miami won 50 games, and Mourning returned to the team in late March, but were swept in the first round by the younger Charlotte Hornets. Grant averaged 10 points and 8 rebounds for the series.

In the 2001–2002 season, with the anticipated return of Mourning to the lineup, Grant returned to his natural power forward position. Grant started in 72 games for Miami averaging 9.3 points and 8.0 rebounds a game for the season, but the Heat failed to reach the postseason. The next year signaled a rebuilding era for the team, as the Heat won just 25 games with Grant averaging 10.3 points a game along with a career high 10.2 rebounds, which placed him at fifth in the league in rebounds per game. He also finished the season 4th in total rebounds, 5th in defensive rebounds, and 10th in the league in field goal percentage at .509 percent, all personal bests. The Heat once again found themselves in the lottery, and would select Dwyane Wade in the draft to join sophomore Caron Butler before acquiring free agent Lamar Odom in the offseason. Alonzo Mourning, who did not play in the 2003 season, left the team and signed with the New Jersey Nets, leaving Grant as the team's best option at the center position. Just prior to the 2003–2004 season, another major franchise change occurred, as Pat Riley stepped down as coach. He would be replaced by longtime assistant Stan Van Gundy.

The 2003–2004 season proved to be a major success for the rebuilding franchise, as the Heat overcame an 0–7 start to eventually make the playoffs as the 4th seed in the East led by the play of Odom, Jones and Wade. Grant started 76 games at center and averaged 8.7 points and 6.9 rebounds a game. In the playoffs, the Heat defeated the New Orleans Hornets, who had relocated from Charlotte, in a challenging 7-game series in which the home team won every game. In the second round the Heat faced the top seeded Indiana Pacers, who took the first two games in Indiana before the Heat won two straight games at home to tie the series at two games apiece, including a game three victory led by Grant's 16 rebounds. The Pacers would win the next two games to advance however, defeating the young Heat team considered to have much promise heading into the future. Grant averaged 7.1 points and 8.6 rebounds a game throughout the postseason.

=== Los Angeles Lakers (2004–2005) ===
During the summer of 2004, the Heat traded Grant (along with Caron Butler, Lamar Odom, and a future first-round draft pick) to the Los Angeles Lakers in exchange for superstar Shaquille O'Neal. Grant would play one year for the rebuilding Lakers, playing in a total of 69 games and starting in eight with career-low averages of 3.8 points and 3.7 rebounds a game.

=== Phoenix Suns (2005–2006) ===
In the 2005 offseason, Grant was released by the Lakers and signed with the Phoenix Suns. He would go on to only appear in 21 games for the Suns, including 5 games in their playoff run which resulted in wins against the Lakers, and the Los Angeles Clippers before falling to the Dallas Mavericks in the Western Finals. Following the season Grant was traded in the 2006 NBA draft to the Boston Celtics with the rights to Rajon Rondo in exchange for a future first-round draft pick. After being waived by the Celtics on October 27, 2006, Grant formally announced his retirement after lingering injuries had reduced his level of play for several seasons.

Brian worked with Greg Oden in the 2009 off-season in Columbus, Ohio, for the purposes of adding more toughness, basketball smarts, and miscellaneous advice.

== Post-playing career ==
On September 28, 2025, Grant was hired to serve as a basketball liaison - an off-court mentor to players - for the Portland Trail Blazers.

== NBA career statistics ==
Legend
GP	Games played	GS	Games started	MPG	Minutes per game
FG%	Field goal percentage	3P%	3-point field goal percentage	FT%	Free throw percentage
RPG	Rebounds per game	APG	Assists per game	SPG	Steals per game
BPG	Blocks per game	PPG	Points per game	**Bold**	Career high
*	Led the league

=== Regular season ===
Year	Team	GP	GS	MPG	FG%	3P%	FT%	RPG	APG	SPG	BPG	PPG
1994–95	Sacramento	80	59	28.6	**.511**	.250	.636	7.5	1.2	.6	**1.5**	13.2
1995–96	Sacramento	78	75	30.7	.507	.235	.732	7.0	1.6	.5	1.3	14.4
1996–97	Sacramento	24	15	25.4	.440	–	.778	5.9	1.2	**.8**	1.0	10.5
1997–98	Portland	61	49	31.5	.508	.000	.750	9.1	1.4	.7	.7	12.1
1998–99	Portland	48	46	31.8	.479	–	.814	9.8	1.4	.4	.7	11.5
1999–00	Portland	63	14	21.0	.491	**.500**	.675	5.5	1.0	.5	.4	7.3
2000–01	Miami	**82**	79	**33.8**	.479	.000	.797	8.8	1.2	.7	.9	**15.2**
2001–02	Miami	72	72	31.3	.469	.000	.849	8.0	**1.9**	.7	.4	9.3
2002–03	Miami	**82**	**82***	32.2	.509	–	.771	**10.2**	1.3	**.8**	.6	10.3
2003–04	Miami	76	76	30.3	.471	.000	.782	6.9	.9	.7	.5	8.7
2004–05	L.A. Lakers	69	8	16.5	.493	–	.722	3.7	.5	.3	.3	3.8
2005–06	Phoenix	21	2	11.8	.415	–	**.875**	2.7	.3	.2	.1	2.9
Career		756	577	28.3	.490	.214	.746	7.4	1.2	.6	.7	10.5

=== Playoffs ===
Year	Team	GP	GS	MPG	FG%	3P%	FT%	RPG	APG	SPG	BPG	PPG
1996	Sacramento	4	4	31.0	.381	–	.500	5.0	1.0	.5	**1.8**	9.8
1997–98	Portland	4	4	33.8	.528	–	**.833**	**10.8**	**1.5**	**1.0**	.8	**13.3**
1998–99	Portland	13	**13**	**37.1**	**.529**	–	.625	9.2	1.1	.8	1.2	13.2
1999–00	Portland	**16**	0	20.0	.446	–	.744	5.8	.5	.4	.4	5.4
2000–01	Miami	3	0	28.0	.417	–	.714	8.0	.3	.0	1.7	10.0
2003–04	Miami	13	**13**	30.8	.429	.000	.571	8.6	.8	.5	.6	7.1
2005–06	Phoenix	5	0	2.5	.333	–	.000	.4	.0	.0	.0	.4
Career		58	34	26.9	.465	.000	.659	7.1	.7	.5	.8	8.2

== Personal life ==
=== Health ===
In November 2005, after talking with a neurologist at OHSU, Grant was diagnosed with early-onset Parkinson's disease. Through discussions and encouragement by well-known Parkinson's sufferers Michael J. Fox and Muhammad Ali, Grant publicized his diagnosis in 2009.

Grant's memoir 'Rebound: Soaring in the NBA, Battling Parkinson's, and Finding What Really Matters' was released in April 2021, co-authored by Ric Bucher.
