= St. Thomas Aquinas High School (Connecticut) =

Defunct high school in Connecticut, United States

Coordinates: 41°39′45″N 72°45′56″W

St. Thomas Aquinas High School was a Roman Catholic senior high school in New Britain, Connecticut.

In 1995 the school established a board, Aquinas Foundation, which implemented fundraisers. Circa 1995 the school had 240 students. The enrollment declined further, and as of 1999 the fundraisers had not resulted in a lot of money going to the school. In the summer of 1999 there were fewer than 100 enrolled students for the upcoming school year, including only 11 9th grade (freshmen) students. In July 1999 the school announced it was closing as the enrollment was too low.

After the closure, the school building was abandoned. In 2016 land planning company TO Design LLC agreed to buy the building for $80,000.

== Notable alumni ==
- Paul Manafort – Class of 1967
- Rod Foster - Class of 1979
- Toby Driver - Class of 1996
- Lamar Odom - Class of 1997

== Notable faculty ==
- Stephen V. Kobasa
- Jerry DeGregorio (Alumni, Class of 1984)
