= Stephen V. Kobasa =

American activist

Stephen Vincent Kobasa (born February 13, 1948) is a Connecticut teacher, journalist, and Christian political activist. He was "instrumental in reconstituting the state's death penalty abolition movement" in 2000.

== Teaching career ==
The son of a well-known Seymour, Connecticut teacher, Kobasa graduated from Seymour High School in 1965, after which he attended Fairfield University.^{,} He holds master's degrees from Yale Divinity School and the University of Chicago. Kobasa taught English at St. Thomas Aquinas High School in New Britain, Connecticut, during the 1980s and 1990s. In 1999 he began teaching English at Kolbe Cathedral High School in Bridgeport, Connecticut. He gained national attention when, in October 2005, he was fired from Kolbe for refusing to display the American flag, the presentation of which he viewed as a "contradiction" to the symbol of the Christian crucifix. When his dismissal was reported in the Boston Globe and other major newspapers, his cause was taken up by a number of political and religious publications. To theologian William T. Cavanaugh, Kobasa's action was a protest against "idolatry." Cavanaugh went on to write:

One final irony of Stephen Kobasa's firing is that it took place at a Catholic school named after St. Maximilian Kolbe. Kolbe was a Franciscan priest who gave himself up to be starved to death at Auschwitz in place of a man who begged to be spared for the sake of his children. Saints like Kolbe keep us alert to the imperative to put loyalty to God over loyalty to the state.

Kobasa appealed unsuccessfully to Church authorities, including William E. Lori, the Bishop of the Bridgeport Diocese, but has ruled out filing a civil lawsuit. On February 14, 2006, he successfully testified before the Connecticut State Senate's Labor and Public Employees Committee, supporting a law which would require employers to notify their employees that they are not eligible for unemployment benefits. The bill was signed into law on April 21, 2006 by Governor Jodi Rell.

== Writing career ==
From 2006 to 2009 he was a writer for the New Haven Advocate. In that capacity he was awarded first prize in Arts and Entertainment writing in a regional, non-daily newspaper by the Society of Professional Journalists. In March 2009 he began a series of "object lessons", brief reflections on art around New Haven, for the New Haven Independent. The sixty-fourth and final lesson was published in July 2010. Since then, he has published over 40 additional articles in the Independent, primarily in two series: "Look Here: New Work By Nearby Artists" and "Eye Show," a 10-part "virtual exhibition" which appeared from February 2012 to February 2013.

Kobasa contributed fifteen articles and art reviews to the Boston-based online art journal Big Red & Shiny. Although he is no longer listed as a regular contributor, he has written two additional pieces for the journal since it reappeared in 2012. He has also been a contributing writer for Artes Magazine since its inception in 2009.

=== Some of Kobasa's Essays ===
- "Allegiance to Conscience." The Catholic Worker (2006).
- “Can art change the world?” Yale University Art Gallery (2007)
- “A Lesson for Martha Stewart—And for Us All” Peacework (2004)
- “More Lies from a Machine: Revisiting the Enola Gay” The Nuclear Resister (2004)
- Hartford’s Wadsworth Atheneum with Caravaggio and His Legacy; Portrait of an Executioner: On Painting Stories. Artes Magazine (2013)

== Activism ==
Kobasa, whose "seemingly average existence has been punctuated by a dozen arrests and short stints in jail," has participated in a range of nonviolent antiwar and human-rights protests since the late 1960s. These demonstrations—and Kobasa's philosophy—are consistent with postmodern Catholic peace traditions, especially liberation theology and peaceful resistance; he became a conscientious objector in 1967. In his hometown of New Haven, Connecticut, he is regarded a "regular at anti-war actions around town," appearing regularly at rallies there.

Since the late 1960s he has been active in antiwar demonstrations and resistance, focusing increasingly on antinuclear protests. He acted as "spokesman" for a group of "disarmament activists" active throughout the 1980s in Connecticut. While most of the attention generated by the protests appears to have remained in Connecticut, in some cases Kobasa's statements found a larger audience. The protests were consistently nonviolent, but varied in terms of their degree of activism; in some cases the group would seek to be arrested He was arrested in 1987 for a protest at Electric Boat shipyard in Groton, Connecticut and in 1995 was convicted of vandalizing the Enola Gay at the National Air and Space Museum in Washington, DC.

In responding to the September 11 attacks, Kobasa imagines ground zero, "for all its horror," as a "miniature of destruction, a fragment of the apocalypse" that would be caused by "the use of a single 475 kiloton warhead."

Among his recent activities, Kobasa was the "main facilitator" of an Iraq war memorial established in late 2007 in New Haven's Broadway Triangle, and was a speaker at a 2009 demonstration protesting racial profiling in East Haven, Connecticut organized by Unidad Latina En Acción.^{,} Much of Kobasa's work as an art critic and curator overlaps with his activism. He arranged for an early 2012 installation at the West Cove Studio Collective in West Haven commemorating the workers who died in the 1911 Triangle Shirtwaist Factory fire in New York City.

== Personal ==
Kobasa married Suzanne (or Suzan) C. Ouellette (born ca. 1948) in Meridien, on September 6, 1969. He married Anne E. Somsel (born February 13, 1948) in New Haven on July 12, 1986.
