= 2003–04 Miami Heat season =

NBA professional basketball team season

- Head coach: Stan Van Gundy
- President: Pat Riley
- General manager: Randy Pfund
- Owner: Micky Arison
- Arena: American Airlines Arena

Results
- Record: 42–40 (.512)
- Place: Division: 2nd (Atlantic); Conference: 4th (Eastern)
- Playoff finish: Conference semifinals (lost to Pacers 2–4)
- Stats at Basketball Reference

Local media
- Television: Sunshine Network, WBFS, WFOR
- Radio: WIOD

The 2003–04 Miami Heat season was the 16th season for the Miami Heat in the National Basketball Association. This season saw the team draft future All-Star and 3-time NBA Champion Dwyane Wade with the fifth overall pick in the 2003 NBA draft, while acquiring forward Lamar Odom from the Los Angeles Clippers. Before the season began, head coach Pat Riley resigned, but he would later return midway in the 2005–06 season and help guide the Heat to their first ever NBA championship. Under new head coach Stan Van Gundy, the Heat stumbled out of the gate losing their first seven games. By the beginning of March, the team had a record of 25–36. However, the Heat rallied to win 17 of their last 21 games, finishing with a final record of 42–40. Despite the mediocre record, the Heat entered the playoffs as the #4 seed in the Eastern Conference. Wade had a stellar rookie season, averaging 16.2 points per game, and was selected to the All-Rookie First Team.

The first round series pitted the Heat against the New Orleans Hornets, then in its second season of existence. The Heat would go on to defeat New Orleans in seven games. They advanced to the Conference Semi-finals for the first time since 2000. However, they went no further as they fell to the top-seeded Indiana Pacers in six games.

Following the season, Odom, second-year forward Caron Butler, and Brian Grant were all traded to the Los Angeles Lakers for big man Shaquille O'Neal, who had bad blood with Kobe Bryant; Bryant blamed O'Neal for the Lakers' loss in the finals to the underdog Detroit Pistons.

== Key dates ==
- June 26 – The 2003 NBA draft took place in New York City.
- July 8 – The free agency period started.
- October 27 – The Heat's regular season began with a road game versus the Philadelphia 76ers at the Wachovia Center.

== Offseason ==
=== 2003 NBA draft ===
Round	Pick	Player	Position	Nationality	School/Club team
1	5	Dwyane Wade	Guard	United States	Marquette
2	33	Jerome Beasley	Forward	United States	North Dakota

=== Free agency ===
Signings:

- Lamar Odom
- Rafer Alston

== Roster ==
2003–04 Miami Heat roster
Players

Pos.	No.	Player	Height	Weight	DOB	From
F	35	Malik Allen	6 ft 10 in (2.08 m)	255 lb (116 kg)	1978-06-27	Villanova
G	11	Rafer Alston	6 ft 2 in (1.88 m)	175 lb (79 kg)	1976-07-24	Fresno State
F	24	Jerome Beasley	6 ft 10 in (2.08 m)	240 lb (109 kg)	1980-05-17	North Dakota
G/F	4	Caron Butler	6 ft 7 in (2.01 m)	228 lb (103 kg)	1980-03-13	Connecticut
G/F	45	Rasual Butler	6 ft 7 in (2.01 m)	205 lb (93 kg)	1979-05-23	La Salle
G	12	Bimbo Coles	6 ft 2 in (1.88 m)	188 lb (85 kg)	1968-04-22	Virginia Tech
F/C	44	Brian Grant	6 ft 9 in (2.06 m)	254 lb (115 kg)	1972-03-05	Xavier
F/C	40	Udonis Haslem	6 ft 8 in (2.03 m)	235 lb (107 kg)	1980-06-09	Florida
G/F	6	Eddie Jones	6 ft 6 in (1.98 m)	200 lb (91 kg)	1971-10-20	Temple
F	7	Lamar Odom	6 ft 10 in (2.08 m)	230 lb (104 kg)	1979-11-06	Rhode Island
G	3	Dwyane Wade	6 ft 4 in (1.93 m)	220 lb (100 kg)	1982-01-17	Marquette
F/C	52	Samaki Walker	6 ft 9 in (2.06 m)	250 lb (113 kg)	1976-02-25	Louisville
F	22	John Wallace	6 ft 8 in (2.03 m)	225 lb (102 kg)	1974-02-09	Syracuse
C	1	Loren Woods	7 ft 2 in (2.18 m)	260 lb (118 kg)	1978-06-21	Arizona
C	15	Wang Zhizhi	7 ft 1 in (2.16 m)	284 lb (129 kg)	1977-07-08	China

Coaches
Head coach
- Stan Van Gundy
Assistant(s)
- Keith Askins
- Bill Foran
- Bob McAdoo
- Erik Spoelstra

Legend
- (DP) Unsigned draft pick
- (FA) Free agent
- (S) Suspended
- Injured

Roster
Updated: March 2, 2004

== Pre-season ==
=== Game log ===
2003 pre-season game log
Pre-season: 5–2 (home: 3–1; road: 2–1)

Game	Date	Team	Score	High points	High rebounds	High assists	Location Attendance	Record
1	October 7	Philadelphia	W 86–79 (OT)	N/A	N/A	N/A	Roberto Clemente Coliseum; 8,893	1–0
2	October 10	Atlanta	W 94–92	N/A	N/A	N/A	TECO Arena; 3,895	2–0
3	October 11	@ Orlando	W 77–75	N/A	N/A	N/A	Amway Arena; 13,118	3–0
4	October 14	San Antonio	W 99–98	N/A	N/A	N/A	AmericanAirlines Arena; 10,019	4–0
5	October 16	@ Atlanta	L 78–92	N/A	N/A	N/A	Philips Arena; 8,193	4–1
6	October 17	@ Detroit	W 84–71	N/A	N/A	N/A	The Palace of Auburn Hills; 19,757	5–1
7	October 21	Memphis	L 82–97	N/A	N/A	N/A	AmericanAirlines Arena; 10,241	5–2

2003–04 season schedule

== Regular season ==
=== Standings ===
Atlantic Division	W	L	PCT	GB	Home	Road	Div
y-New Jersey Nets	47	35	.573	–	28–13	19–22	18–7
x-Miami Heat	42	40	.512	5	29–12	13–28	15–10
x-New York Knicks	39	43	.476	8	23–18	16–25	15–7
x-Boston Celtics	36	46	.439	11	19–22	17–24	14–10
e-Philadelphia 76ers	33	49	.402	14	21–20	12–29	10–14
e-Washington Wizards	25	57	.305	22	17–24	8–33	3–21
e-Orlando Magic	21	61	.256	26	11–30	10–31	8–16

#	Eastern Conference				
#	Team	W	L	PCT	GB
1	z-Indiana Pacers	61	21	.744	–
2	y-New Jersey Nets	47	35	.573	14
3	x-Detroit Pistons	54	28	.659	7
4	x-Miami Heat	42	40	.512	19
5	x-New Orleans Hornets	41	41	.500	20
6	x-Milwaukee Bucks	41	41	.500	20
7	x-New York Knicks	39	43	.476	22
8	x-Boston Celtics	36	46	.439	25
9	e-Cleveland Cavaliers	35	47	.427	26
10	e-Toronto Raptors	33	49	.402	28
11	e-Philadelphia 76ers	33	49	.402	28
12	e-Atlanta Hawks	28	54	.341	33
13	e-Washington Wizards	25	57	.305	36
14	e-Chicago Bulls	23	59	.280	38
15	e-Orlando Magic	21	61	.256	40

=== Game log ===
==== October ====
Record: 0-3; home: 0-1; road: 0–2

#	Date	Visitor	Score	Home	OT	Leading Scorer	Venue	Record
1	October 28	Miami	74–89	Philadelphia	NO	Dwyane Wade (18)	Wachovia Center	0–1
2	October 29	Miami	75–98	Boston	NO	Eddie Jones (22)	Fleet Center	0–2
3	October 31	Detroit	93–81	Miami	NO	Eddie Jones (20)	American Airlines Arena	0–3

==== November ====
Record: 5–9; home: 4–2; road: 1–7

#	Date	Visitor	Score	Home	OT	Leading scorer	Venue	Record
4	November 3	Miami	93-103	Dallas	NO	Udonis Haslem (20)	American Airlines Center	0–4
5	November 4	Miami	73–80	San Antonio	NO	Eddie Jones (26)	SBC Center	0–5
6	November 8	Minnesota	88–79	Miami	NO	Eddie Jones (24)	American Airlines Arena	0–6
7	November 11	Houston	90–70	Miami	NO	Eddie Jones (21)	American Airlines Arena	0–7
8	November 12	Cleveland	83–88	Miami	NO	Eddie Jones (25)	American Airlines Arena	1–7
9	November 13	Washington	101–105	Miami	NO	Eddie Jones (26)	American Airlines Arena	2–7
10	November 16	Miami	77–99	L.A. Lakers	NO	Lamar Odom (18)	Staples Center	2–8
11	November 18	Miami	105–98	Seattle	NO	Lamar Odom (21)	KeyArena	3–8
12	November 19	Miami	93–94	Portland	NO	Eddie Jones (26)	Rose Garden	3–9
13	November 21	Miami	91–101	Golden State	NO	Lamar Odom (20)	The Arena in Oakland	3–10
14	November 22	Miami	98–100	Phoenix	1	Dwyane Wade (27)	America West Arena	3–11
15	November 25	New Orleans	87–91	Miami	NO	Eddie Jones (25)	American Airlines Arena	4–11
16	November 28	Miami	83–95	Atlanta	NO	Eddie Jones (28)	Philips Arena	4–12
17	November 29	Toronto	66–78	Miami	NO	Dwyane Wade (16)	American Airlines Arena	5–12

==== December ====
Record: 8–7; home: 5–3; road: 3–4

#	Date	Visitor	Score	Home	OT	Leading scorer	Venue	Record
18	December 3	Miami	73-87	Detroit	NO	Lamar Odom (22)	The Palace of Auburn Hills	5–13
19	December 5	Philadelphia	93–90	Miami	NO	Dwyane Wade (21)	American Airlines Arena	5–14
20	December 6	San Antonio	86–70	Miami	NO	Lamar Odom (17)	American Airlines Arena	5–15
21	December 9	Phoenix	72–92	Miami	NO	Lamar Odom (16)	American Airlines Arena	6–15
22	December 12	Memphis	88–91	Miami	NO	Lamar Odom (29)	American Airlines Arena	7–15
23	December 14	Miami	90–89	Toronto	NO	Dwyane Wade (23)	Air Canada Centre	8–15
24	December 16	Atlanta	79–97	Miami	NO	Lamar Odom (18)	American Airlines Arena	9–15
25	December 17	Miami	76–87	Philadelphia	NO	Dwyane Wade (22)	Wachovia Center	9–16
26	December 19	Miami	83–97	Memphis	NO	Dwyane Wade (21)	The Pyramid	9–17
27	December 21	Golden State	93–104	Miami	NO	Dwyane Wade (33)	American Airlines Arena	10–17
28	December 23	Washington	72–79	Miami	NO	Dwyane Wade (20)	American Airlines Arena	11–17
29	December 26	Miami	92–84	Washington	NO	Eddie Jones (22)	MCI Center	12–17
30	December 27	New York	100–80	Miami	NO	Eddie Jones (25)	Philips Arena	12–18
31	December 29	Miami	90–83	Chicago	NO	Lamar Odom (25)	United Center	13–18
32	December 30	Miami	73–102	New York	NO	Lamar Odom (19)	Madison Square Garden	13–19

==== January ====
Record: 8–8; home: 6–2; road: 2–6

#	Date	Visitor	Score	Home	OT	Leading scorer	Venue	Record
33	January 2	Orlando	101-112	Miami	NO	Eddie Jones (33)	American Airlines Arena	14–19
34	January 5	Indiana	87–65	Miami	NO	Brian Grant (14)	American Airlines Arena	14–20
35	January 7	Chicago	95–102	Miami	NO	Eddie Jones (27)	American Airlines Arena	15–20
36	January 9	Miami	94–103	Milwaukee	NO	Lamar Odom (22)	Bradley Center	15–21
37	January 10	Miami	77–83	Minnesota	NO	Brian Grant (17)	Target Center	15–22
38	January 13	Miami	86–90	Sacramento	NO	Lamar Odom (21)	ARCO Arena	15–23
39	January 15	Miami	85–97	Utah	NO	Eddie Jones (18)	Delta Center	15–24
40	January 16	Miami	87–85	L.A. Clippers	NO	Eddie Jones (22)	Staples Center	16–24
41	January 18	Miami	80–88	Denver	NO	Lamar Odom (26)	Pepsi Center	16–25
42	January 20	Boston	86–84	Miami	NO	Udonis Haslem (18)	American Airlines Arena	16–26
43	January 23	New Jersey	64–85	Miami	NO	Eddie Jones (18)	American Airlines Arena	17–26
44	January 24	Miami	85–77	New York	NO	Eddie Jones (26)	Madison Square Garden	18–26
45	January 26	Houston	81–95	Miami	NO	Eddie Jones (27)	American Airlines Arena	19–26
46	January 28	Miami	93–94	Cleveland	NO	Eddie Jones (16)	Gund Arena	19–27
47	January 30	L.A. Clippers	88–97	Miami	NO	Lamar Odom (25)	American Airlines Arena	20–27
48	January 30	New Orleans hornets	70-94	Miami	NO		American Airlines Arena	21–27

==== February ====
Record: 4–8; home: 3–4; road: 1–4

#	Date	Visitor	Score	Home	OT	Leading scorer	Venue	Record
49	February 2	Detroit	102-100	Miami	1	Eddie Jones (19)	American Airlines Arena	21–28
50	February 4	Miami	88–99	New Jersey	NO	Lamar Odom (27)	Continental Airlines Arena	21–29
51	February 7	New York	64–76	Miami	NO	Lamar Odom (18)	American Airlines Arena	21–30
52	February 8	Miami	91–97	Indiana	NO	Lamar Odom (25)	Conseco Fieldhouse	21–31
53	February 10	L.A. Lakers	98–83	Miami	NO	Dwyane Wade (20)	American Airlines Arena	21–32
54	February 11	Miami	111–98	Orlando	NO	Dwyane Wade (27)	TD Waterhouse Centre	22–32
55	February 17	Utah	85–97	Miami	NO	Dwyane Wade (31)	American Airlines Arena	23–32
56	February 20	Atlanta	92–125	Miami	NO	Eddie Jones (24)	American Airlines Arena	24–32
57	February 21	Denver	81–97	Miami	NO	Dwyane Wade (28)	American Airlines Arena	25–32
58	February 23	Portland	89–81	Miami	NO	Lamar Odom (25)	American Airlines Arena	25–33
59	February 28	Miami	86–92	New Jersey	NO	Dwyane Wade (20)	Continental Airlines Arena	25–34
60	February 29	Miami	104–108	Milwaukee	NO	Eddie Jones (25)	Bradley Center	25–35

==== March ====
Record: 12–3; home: 9–1; road: 3–2

#	Date	Visitor	Score	Home	OT	Leading scorer	Venue	Record
61	March 2	Toronto	89-86	Miami	NO	Lamar Odom (23)	American Airlines Arena	25–36
62	March 4	Milwaukee	98–104	Miami	NO	Rafer Alston (23)	American Airlines Arena	26–36
63	March 6	Sacramento	96–102	Miami	NO	Lamar Odom (30)	American Airlines Arena	27–36
64	March 9	Orlando	89–100	Miami	NO	Rasual Butler (19)	American Airlines Arena	28–36
65	March 10	Miami	84–95	New Orleans	NO	Udonis Haslem (15)	New Orleans Arena	28–37
66	March 12	Seattle	74–82	Miami	NO	Rafer Alston (15)	American Airlines Arena	29–37
67	March 14	New Jersey	95–104	Miami	NO	Caron Butler (24)	American Airlines Arena	30–37
68	March 16	New Orleans	83–96	Miami	NO	Dwyane Wade (23)	American Airlines Arena	31–37
69	March 20	Philadelphia	69–101	Miami	NO	Eddie Jones (17)	American Airlines Arena	32–37
70	March 21	Miami	101–81	Washington	NO	Dwyane Wade (22)	MCI Center	33–37
71	March 24	Miami	105–90	Orlando	NO	Eddie Jones (28)	TD Waterhouse Centre	34–37
72	March 26	Dallas	118–119	Miami	NO	Lamar Odom (26)	American Airlines Arena	35–37
73	March 28	Miami	100–80	Indiana	NO	Caron Butler (14)	Conseco Fieldhouse	35–38
74	March 29	Chicago	96–105	Miami	NO	Eddie Jones (21)	American Airlines Arena	36–38
75	March 30	Miami	100–97	Atlanta	NO	Eddie Jones (23)	Philips Arena	37–38

==== April ====
Record: 5–2; home: 3–0; road: 2–2

#	Date	Visitor	Score	Home	OT	Leading scorer	Venue	Record
76	April 2	Miami	102-100	Detroit	NO	Lamar Odom (18)	The Palace of Auburn Hills	37–39
77	April 3	Miami	97–83	Chicago	NO	Eddie Jones (21)	United Center	38–39
78	April 7	Boston	101–104	Miami	NO	Lamar Odom (24)	American Airlines Arena	39–39
79	April 9	Cleveland	91–106	Miami	NO	Dwyane Wade (20)	American Airlines Arena	40–39
80	April 10	Miami	80–91	Cleveland	NO	Dwyane Wade (17)	Gund Arena	40–40
81	April 11	Miami	84–77	Boston	NO	Rafer Alston (15)	Fleet Center	41–40
82	April 17	New Jersey	84–96	Miami	NO	Dwyane Wade (15)	American Airlines Arena	42–40

== Playoffs ==
2004 playoff game log
First round: 4–3 (home: 4–0; road: 0–3)

Game	Date	Team	Score	High points	High rebounds	High assists	Location Attendance	Series
1	April 18	New Orleans	W 81–79	Dwyane Wade (21)	Lamar Odom (11)	Odom, Wade (5)	American Airlines Arena; 20,102	1–0
2	April 21	New Orleans	W 93–63	Eddie Jones (19)	Brian Grant (11)	Dwyane Wade (6)	American Airlines Arena; 20,189	2–0
3	April 24	@ New Orleans	L 71–77	Caron Butler (24)	Caron Butler (15)	Caron Butler (4)	New Orleans Arena; 14,251	2–1
4	April 27	@ New Orleans	L 85–96	Lamar Odom (25)	Brian Grant (9)	Dwyane Wade (10)	New Orleans Arena; 16,009	2–2
5	April 30	New Orleans	W 87–83	Eddie Jones (25)	Caron Butler (11)	Dwyane Wade (5)	American Airlines Arena; 20,147	3–2
6	May 2	@ New Orleans	L 83–89	Dwyane Wade (27)	Lamar Odom (11)	Dwyane Wade (6)	New Orleans Arena; 17,297	3–3
7	May 4	New Orleans	W 85–77	Caron Butler (23)	three players tied (9)	Dwyane Wade (7)	American Airlines Arena; 20,286	4–3

Conference Semi-finals: 2–4 (home: 2–1; road: 0–3)

Game	Date	Team	Score	High points	High rebounds	High assists	Location Attendance	Series
1	May 6	@ Indiana	L 81–94	Dwyane Wade (22)	Caron Butler (9)	Alston, Wade (4)	Conseco Fieldhouse; 18,345	0–1
2	May 8	@ Indiana	L 80–91	Odom, Wade (19)	Lamar Odom (12)	Alston, Wade (5)	Conseco Fieldhouse; 18,345	0–2
3	May 10	Indiana	W 94–87	Dwyane Wade (25)	Brian Grant (16)	Dwyane Wade (6)	American Airlines Arena; 20,115	1–2
4	May 12	Indiana	W 100–88	Lamar Odom (22)	Caron Butler (10)	Dwyane Wade (7)	American Airlines Arena; 20,128	2–2
5	May 15	@ Indiana	L 83–94	Dwyane Wade (16)	Lamar Odom (10)	Dwyane Wade (10)	Conseco Fieldhouse; 18,345	2–3
6	May 18	Indiana	L 70–73	Dwyane Wade (24)	Brian Grant (10)	three players tied (2)	American Airlines Arena; 20,136	2–4

2004 schedule

== Player statistics ==
=== Regular season ===
Player	POS	GP	GS	MP	REB	AST	STL	BLK	PTS	MPG	RPG	APG	SPG	BPG	PPG
Rafer Alston	PG	82	28	2,581	226	372	114	18	838	31.5	2.8	4.5	1.4	.2	10.2
Eddie Jones	SG	81	81	2,998	308	258	92	34	1,401	37.0	3.8	3.2	1.1	.4	17.3
Lamar Odom	PF	80	80	3,003	776	327	85	71	1,371	37.5	9.7	4.1	1.1	.9	17.1
Brian Grant	C	76	76	2,303	524	69	51	35	664	30.3	6.9	.9	.7	.5	8.7
Udonis Haslem	PF	75	24	1,795	473	51	33	24	550	23.9	6.3	.7	.4	.3	7.3
Caron Butler	SF	68	56	2,030	326	126	75	13	623	29.9	4.8	1.9	1.1	.2	9.2
Dwyane Wade	PG	61	56	2,126	247	275	86	34	991	34.9	4.0	4.5	1.4	.6	16.2
Malik Allen	PF	45	6	616	119	16	12	28	191	13.7	2.6	.4	.3	.6	4.2
Rasual Butler	SF	45	0	675	61	23	10	13	304	15.0	1.4	.5	.2	.3	6.8
Loren Woods	C	38	2	506	134	10	11	19	121	13.3	3.5	.3	.3	.5	3.2
John Wallace	SF	37	0	368	59	14	5	8	158	9.9	1.6	.4	.1	.2	4.3
Samaki Walker	PF	33	0	418	112	6	9	11	105	12.7	3.4	.2	.3	.3	3.2
Bimbo Coles	PG	22	1	170	10	15	3	0	28	7.7	.5	.7	.1	.0	1.3
Wang Zhizhi^{†}	C	14	0	105	14	2	3	4	43	7.5	1.0	.1	.2	.3	3.1
Tyrone Hill	PF	5	0	38	8	0	0	1	9	7.6	1.6	.0	.0	.2	1.8
Kirk Penney	SG	2	0	18	1	1	1	0	3	9.0	.5	.5	.5	.0	1.5
Jerome Beasley	PF	2	0	5	1	0	0	0	2	2.5	.5	.0	.0	.0	1.0

- ^{†} Denotes player spent time with another team in the season. Stats reflect time with the Heat only.

=== Playoffs ===
Player	POS	GP	GS	MP	REB	AST	STL	BLK	PTS	MPG	RPG	APG	SPG	BPG	PPG
Lamar Odom	PF	13	13	512	108	37	15	10	219	39.4	8.3	2.8	1.2	.8	16.8
Caron Butler	SF	13	13	511	110	31	28	7	167	39.3	8.5	2.4	2.2	.5	12.8
Dwyane Wade	PG	13	13	510	52	73	17	4	234	39.2	4.0	5.6	1.3	.3	18.0
Eddie Jones	SG	13	13	478	47	29	18	11	172	36.8	3.6	2.2	1.4	.8	13.2
Brian Grant	C	13	13	399	112	10	7	8	92	30.7	8.6	.8	.5	.6	7.1
Rafer Alston	PG	13	0	295	29	22	5	1	91	22.7	2.2	1.7	.4	.1	7.0
Udonis Haslem	PF	13	0	199	44	3	5	3	47	15.3	3.4	.2	.4	.2	3.6
Malik Allen	PF	10	0	138	30	4	2	9	50	13.8	3.0	.4	.2	.9	5.0
Rasual Butler	SF	10	0	58	11	2	1	0	21	5.8	1.1	.2	.1	.0	2.1
Samaki Walker	PF	4	0	11	1	0	0	0	0	2.8	.3	.0	.0	.0	.0
Wang Zhizhi	C	3	0	7	0	1	0	0	0	2.3	.0	.3	.0	.0	.0
Loren Woods	C	1	0	2	0	0	0	0	0	2.0	.0	.0	.0	.0	.0
