= Jerry DeGregorio =

American basketball coach

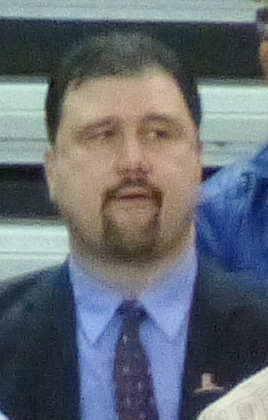
- DeGregorio in 2013

Personal information
- Born: February 20, 1962 (age 64) New Britain, Connecticut, U.S.

Career information
- High school: St. Thomas Aquinas (New Britain, Connecticut)
- College: St. John's
- Coaching career: 1985–present

Career history

Coaching
- 1985–1988: Hofstra (assistant)
- 1988–1990: St. Thomas Aquinas College (assistant)
- 1990–1991: Mattatuck CC (assistant)
- 1991–1992: Mattatuck CC
- 1993–1997: St. Thomas Aquinas HS
- 1997–1999: Rhode Island (assistant)
- 1999–2001: Rhode Island
- 2001–2003: Los Angeles Clippers (assistant)
- 2004–2005: Fayetteville Patriots (assistant)
- 2011–2014: Golden State Warriors (assistant)

Gennaro L. "Jerry" DeGregorio (born February 20, 1962) is an American basketball coach. He was the head basketball coach of the University of Rhode Island, where he coached the Rams from 1999 to 2001.

== Early life and education ==
Born in New Britain, Connecticut, DeGregorio grew up in the Little Italy section of The Bronx, New York. DeGregorio earned a B.A. from St. John's University of New York City in 1988 and took master's-level classes at Hofstra University and Wesleyan University.

== Career ==
DeGregorio began his coaching career in 1985 as an assistant coach for Hofstra University. In 1988, DeGregorio became an assistant coach for St. Thomas Aquinas College. After taking a year off to attend a Hofstra University graduate program, DeGregorio became an assistant coach for Mattatuck Community College in 1990 and then head coach for the college in the 1991–92 season. From 1993 to 1997, DeGregorio was head boys' basketball coach and athletic director at St. Thomas Aquinas High School of New Britain, Connecticut. Although he never played a game for the Saints, future NBA player Lamar Odom attended Aquinas.

He moved to Rhode Island in 1997 as top assistant to Jim Harrick, shortly after Lamar Odom transferred from UNLV. Harrick abruptly left for Georgia after the 1998–99 season, and DeGregorio was named head coach. Just days later, however, Odom announced he was entering the 1999 NBA draft. In rapid succession, four prospective recruits dropped URI from their lists, another was ruled ineligible, and a key reserve was lost to academics. With a decimated roster, DeGregorio's first team struggled to a 5–25 record, worst in school history.

DeGregorio's second season was little better, at 7-23, but DeGregorio resigned after the season. In 2001, the Los Angeles Clippers of the NBA hired DeGregorio as an assistant coach and director of player development. DeGregorio served in that position until 2003, when he began working as an independent skill development coach for many star NBA players. In 2004, the Fayetteville Patriots of the NBA Development League hired DeGregorio as assistant coach. He joined the Golden State Warriors in 2011 as an assistant coach. In 2018, He joined the Clemson Tigers women's basketball as Director of Quality Control.

== Head coaching record ==
Record table
Season	Team	Overall	Conference	Standing	Postseason
Rhode Island Rams (Atlantic 10 Conference) (1999–2001)
1999–00	Rhode Island	5–25	2–14	6th (East)	
2000–01	Rhode Island	7–23	3–13	T–10th	
Rhode Island:		12–48	5–27		
Total:		12–48			
