= Caron Butler =

American basketball player (born 1980)

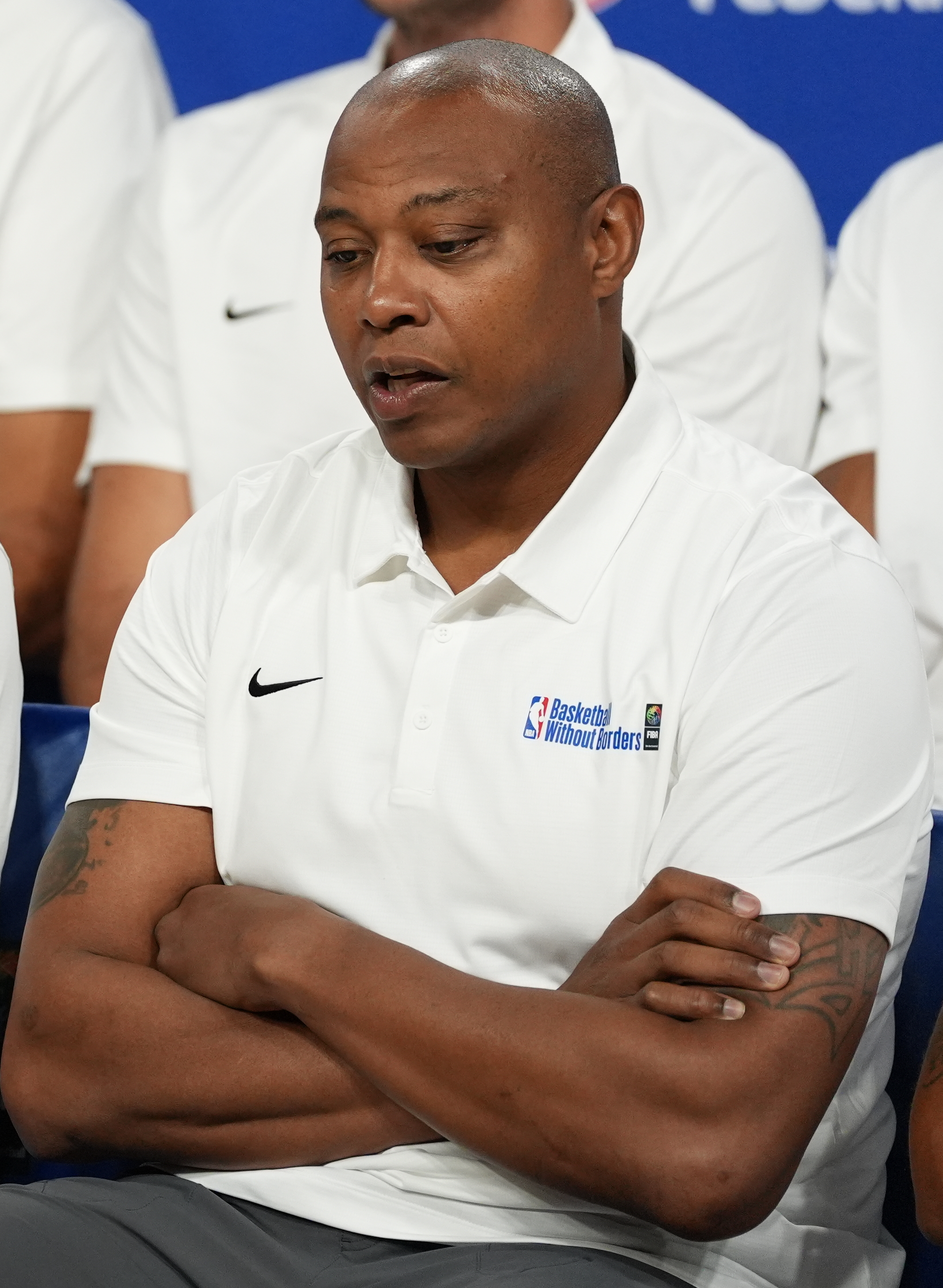
- Butler in 2026

Miami Heat
- Title: Assistant coach
- League: NBA

Personal information
- Born: March 13, 1980 (age 46) Racine, Wisconsin, U.S.
- Listed height: 6 ft 7 in (2.01 m)
- Listed weight: 228 lb (103 kg)

Career information
- High school: Racine Park (Racine, Wisconsin); Maine Central Institute (Pittsfield, Maine)
- College: UConn (2000–2002)
- NBA draft: 2002: 1st round, 10th overall pick
- Drafted by: Miami Heat
- Playing career: 2002–2016
- Position: Small forward
- Number: 4, 1, 3, 5, 2, 31
- Coaching career: 2020–present

Career history

Playing
- 2002–2004: Miami Heat
- 2004–2005: Los Angeles Lakers
- 2005–2010: Washington Wizards
- 2010–2011: Dallas Mavericks
- 2011–2013: Los Angeles Clippers
- 2013–2014: Milwaukee Bucks
- 2014: Oklahoma City Thunder
- 2014–2015: Detroit Pistons
- 2015–2016: Sacramento Kings

Coaching
- 2020–present: Miami Heat (assistant)

Career highlights
- NBA champion (2011); 2× NBA All-Star (2007, 2008); NBA All-Rookie First Team (2003); Second-team All-American – SN (2002); Big East Player of the Year (2002); First-team All-Big East (2002); Third-team All-Big East (2001)

Career statistics
- Points: 12,430 (14.1 ppg)
- Rebounds: 4,387 (5.0 rpg)
- Assists: 2,007 (2.3 apg)
- Stats at NBA.com
- Stats at Basketball Reference
Medals
Men's basketball
Representing United States
FIBA U21 World Championship
Gold medal – first place	2001 Saitama	Team competition

James Caron Butler (born March 13, 1980) is an American professional basketball coach and former player who is an assistant coach for the Miami Heat of the National Basketball Association. He was the 2002 Big East Conference Men's Basketball Player of the Year while playing for the Connecticut Huskies. During his 14-year NBA career, Butler played for the Miami Heat, Los Angeles Lakers, Washington Wizards, Dallas Mavericks, Los Angeles Clippers, Milwaukee Bucks, Oklahoma City Thunder, Detroit Pistons, and Sacramento Kings. He is a two-time NBA All-Star.

== Early life ==
Butler was born and raised in Racine, Wisconsin, where he suffered through a rough childhood; Butler was a drug dealer at age 12 and got arrested 15 times before the age of 15. Butler discovered his love for basketball while at a youth detention center. He played in Amateur Athletic Union basketball in 1998 and 1999. After a brief career at Racine Park High School, Butler enrolled at Maine Central Institute, where he was successful enough to receive a scholarship to attend the University of Connecticut to play for the Connecticut Huskies men's basketball team for coach Jim Calhoun for two years.

== College career ==
At Connecticut, Butler lost 15 pounds (6.8 kg) and developed his perimeter game. As a freshman, Butler led the Huskies, only two years removed from a national championship, in scoring (15.3 points per game) and rebounds (7.6 per game). The summer after his freshman season, he started for the US team that took home gold in the 2001 FIBA World Championship for Young Men.

Butler improved as a sophomore, averaging 20.3 points and 7.5 rebounds per game, leading the Huskies to regular-season and tournament Big East titles. His accolades included Big East tournament MVP, co-Big East player of the year (with Pittsburgh's Brandin Knight), and second-team All-American. Butler led the Huskies to the Elite 8 of the NCAA basketball tournament. In the quarter-final game, he scored 32 points, but the Huskies lost a close game to the eventual national champion Maryland Terrapins. After the season ended, Butler declared for the NBA draft.

== NBA career ==
=== Miami Heat (2002–2004) ===
Butler was a lottery pick in the 2002 NBA draft, selected with the 10th overall pick by the rebuilding Miami Heat. Miami relied on the rookie Butler immediately: he started all 78 games he played in during the season. Butler finished with an average of 15.4 points, 5.1 rebounds, and 1.8 steals per game—the latter good for eighth in the league. Miami won just 25 games and missed the playoffs, but Butler excelled. He won rookie-of-the-month awards four times during the season, was picked to play in the rookie challenge game at that year's All-Star weekend in Atlanta, and at season's end was named to the first team on the NBA All-Rookie Team. After the season, Miami entered the draft lottery, drafted Dwyane Wade, and acquired Lamar Odom from the Los Angeles Clippers.

In the 2003–04 season, Butler struggled with injuries, starting just 56 of 68 games. His scoring average fell to 9.2 points, but Miami's balanced offense led by Wade, Odom, and Eddie Jones propelled Miami into the playoffs. In the first round, the Heat and the New Orleans Hornets battled in a grueling seven-game series in which the home team won every game. In Game 7, Miami closed out the series with Butler scoring 23 points with nine rebounds. The Heat advanced to the play the top-seeded Indiana Pacers, who were heavily favored and won the first two games of the series before Miami responded with two home wins to tie the series at two games apiece. Butler scored 21 points with 10 rebounds in the fourth game, but the Heat lost the series in six games. After the season, Butler, Odom, and Brian Grant were traded to the Los Angeles Lakers for superstar center Shaquille O'Neal.

=== Los Angeles Lakers (2004–2005) ===
The Lakers had been a title contender but were now in rebuilding mode led by superstar guard Kobe Bryant. Butler started in all of his 77 games in the 2004–05 season, averaging 15.5 points a game with a then-career-high field-goal percentage of 44.5% percent. The Lakers struggled with injuries and a midseason coaching change and failed to make the playoffs. The team later traded Butler and Chucky Atkins to the Washington Wizards for Kwame Brown and Laron Profit.

=== Washington Wizards (2005–2010) ===
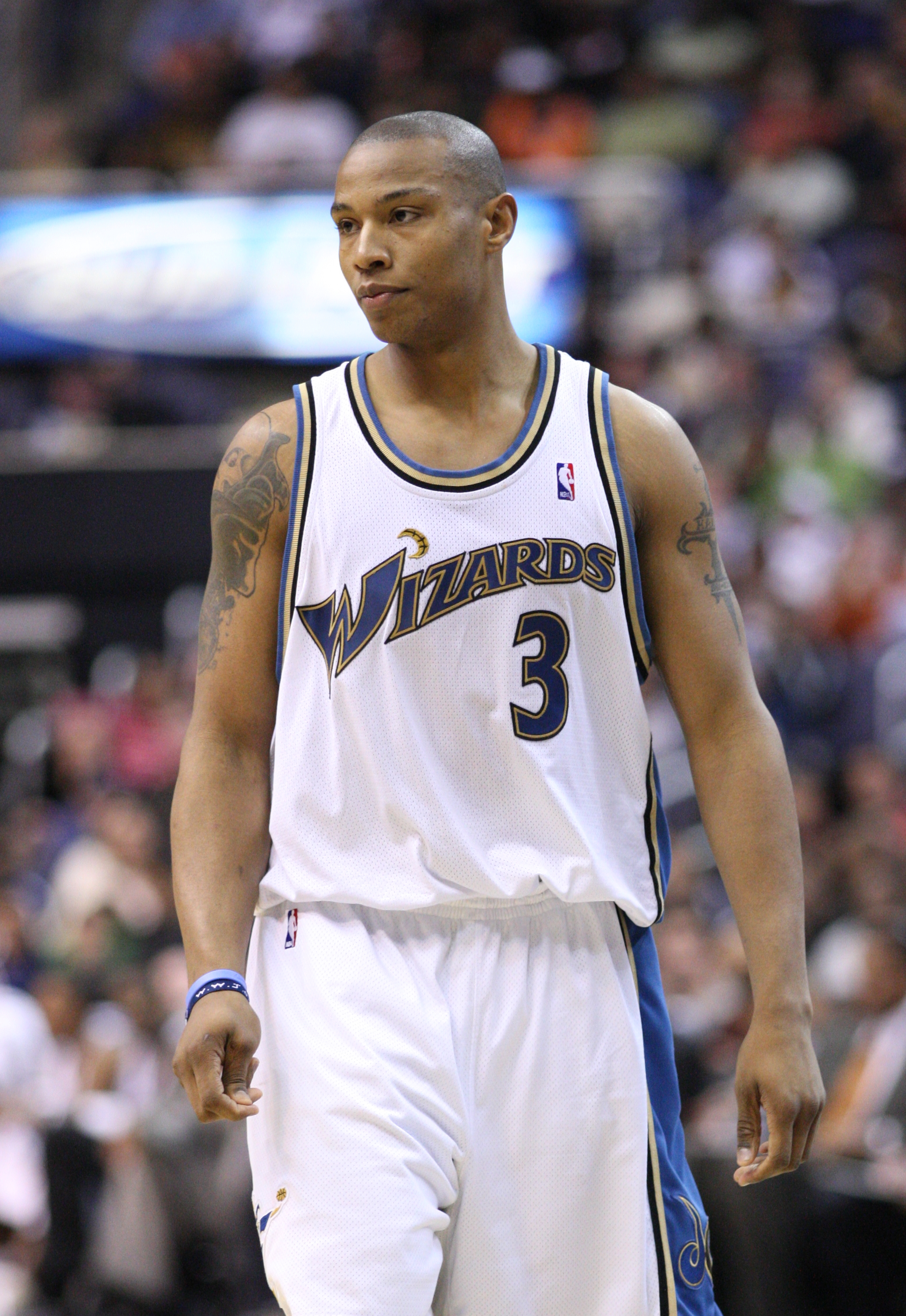
Butler in 2007

Upon arriving in Washington, Butler signed a five-year, $46 million deal. He became part of Washington's new "Big 3", a trio made up of teammates Gilbert Arenas and Antawn Jamison. Butler was nicknamed "Tough Juice" by coach Eddie Jordan for his aggressive and passionate play, epitomized by Butler's 20 rebounds in the Game 6 loss of the playoff-opening-round series against LeBron James and the Cleveland Cavaliers.

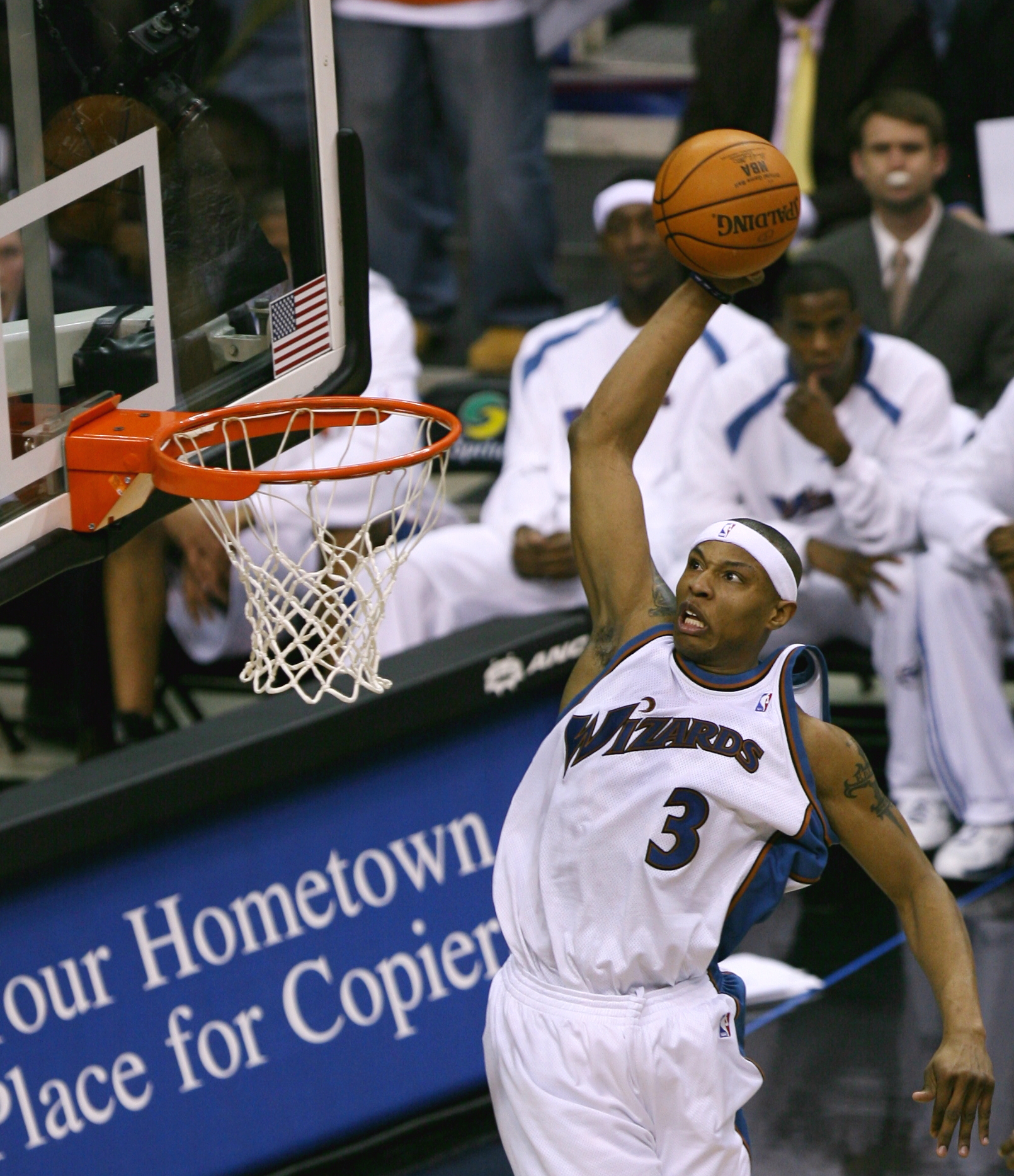
Butler dunking the ball

On January 17, 2007, Butler made his first game-winning basket, a dunk off a pass from DeShawn Stevenson with 2.2 seconds remaining against the Knicks to give the Wizards a narrow 99–98 victory. Butler was named Eastern Conference Player of the Week for January 15–21, 2007. It was his best season yet, posting career-high averages in rebounds, assists, and points. Butler was named as a reserve to the 2007 NBA Eastern Conference All-Star team, his first appearance. He broke his hand late in the season attempting to block a shot and sat out the playoffs, along with the injured Gilbert Arenas, and the Wizards were swept in their opening-round rematch with the Cavaliers.

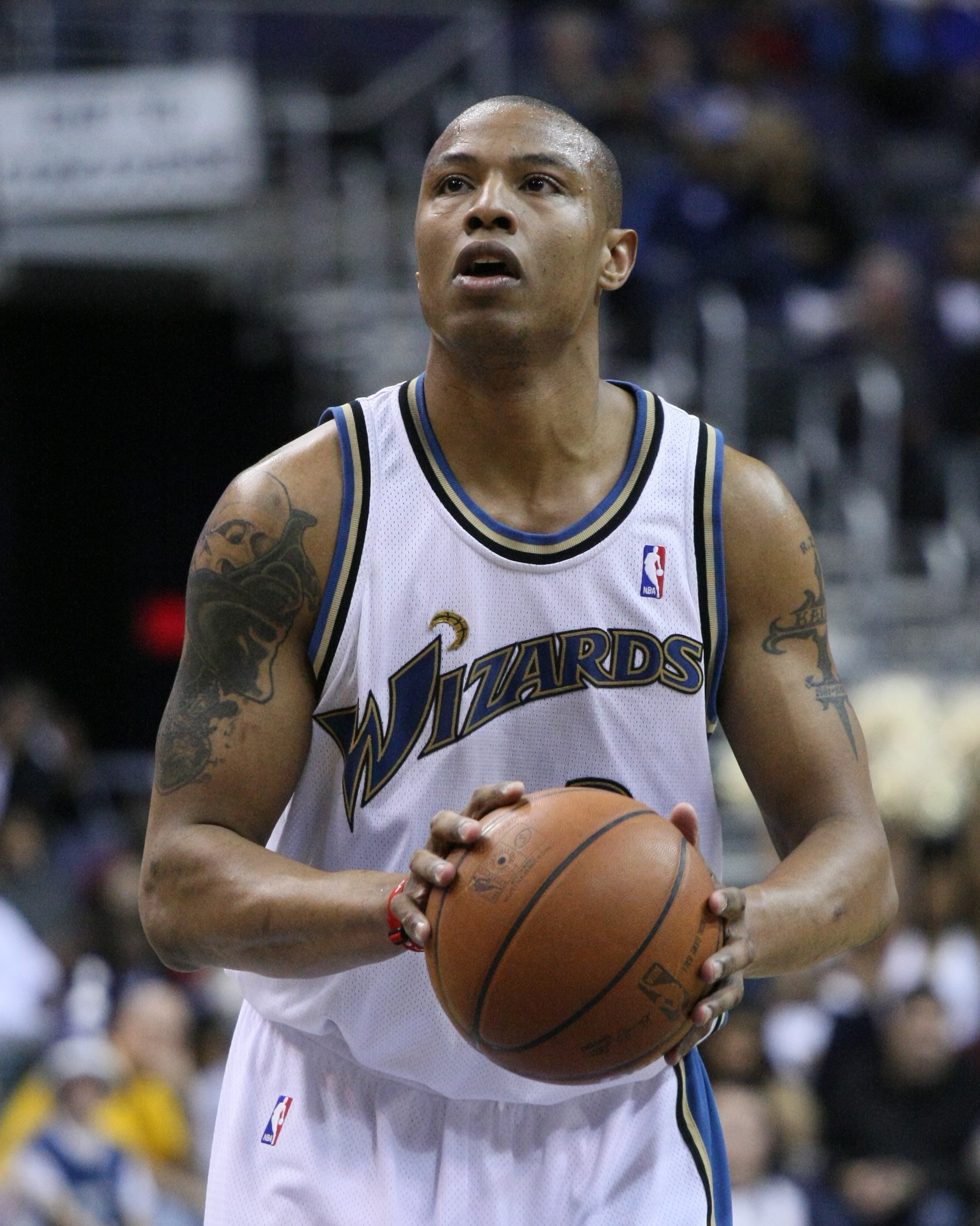
Butler shooting a free throw

In the 2007–08 season, Butler, who was sidelined with a hip injury, but was still selected as a reserve for the East in the 2008 NBA All-Star Game in New Orleans, Louisiana. He missed 20 of the Wizards' last 35 games of the season. Butler returned to the lineup on March 13 (his 28th birthday), when the Wizards hosted the Cavaliers. Butler recorded 19 points (8-for-18 field goals) and five rebounds in 41 minutes in the Wizards' 101–99 victory.

=== Dallas Mavericks (2010–2011) ===
On February 13, 2010, Butler was traded to the Dallas Mavericks along with Brendan Haywood and Deshawn Stevenson for Josh Howard, Drew Gooden, James Singleton, and Quinton Ross. The Mavericks qualified for the 2010 NBA Playoffs as the second seed in the Western Conference, but were upset in six games by the San Antonio Spurs in the first round.

On January 4, 2011, Butler was ruled out for the rest of the 2010–11 season after undergoing surgery to repair a ruptured right patellar tendon. The Mavericks went on to defeat the Miami Heat 4–2 in the 2011 NBA Finals to claim their first NBA championship.

=== Los Angeles Clippers (2011–2013) ===
On December 9, 2011, Butler signed a three-year, $24 million deal with the Los Angeles Clippers. During his two seasons as a starter with the Clippers, Butler helped the team reach the playoffs twice.

=== Milwaukee Bucks (2013–2014) ===
On July 10, 2013, Butler was traded to the Phoenix Suns alongside Eric Bledsoe in a three-way trade that had both Jared Dudley from the Suns and JJ Redick from the Milwaukee Bucks join the Clippers and two different second round picks being sent to the Bucks. On August 29, the Suns traded Butler to the Milwaukee Bucks for Ish Smith and Viacheslav Kravtsov. On November 22, Butler scored a game-leading 38 points, his largest single game total since 2009, during an overtime 115–107 loss to the Philadelphia 76ers.

On February 27, 2014, Butler was bought out of his contract by the Bucks, and in 34 games, he averaged 11.0 points per game.

=== Oklahoma City Thunder (2014) ===
On March 1, 2014, Butler signed with the Oklahoma City Thunder. He finished the season having played in 22 regular season games and 17 playoff games for the Thunder, as they qualified for the Western Conference Finals where they were defeated by the San Antonio Spurs.

=== Detroit Pistons (2014–2015) ===
On July 15, 2014, Butler signed with the Detroit Pistons to a reported two-year, $9 million contract.

On June 11, 2015, Butler was traded, along with Shawne Williams, to the Milwaukee Bucks in exchange for Ersan İlyasova. However, he was later waived on June 30.

=== Sacramento Kings (2015–2016) ===
On July 23, 2015, Butler signed with the Sacramento Kings. He received minimal minutes during the 2015–16 season and made just 17 appearances, averaging 3.7 points and 1.3 rebounds per game.

On June 21, 2016, Butler exercised his player option with the Kings for the 2016–17 season. However, Butler was waived by the Kings on July 4 after reaching an agreement with the team to have his contract bought out.

Butler's final NBA game was on April 11, 2016, a 105–101 victory over the Phoenix Suns, where he recorded seven points, two rebounds, an assist, and a block.

=== Retirement ===
Butler announced his retirement on February 6, 2018.

== Coaching career ==
On November 14, 2020, the Miami Heat announced that they had hired Butler as an assistant coach.

== Other activities ==
In 2015, Butler released an autobiography entitled Tuff Juice: My Journey from the Streets to the NBA. In 2019 Mark Wahlberg signed on as the executive producer of Butler's biopic of the same name.

In 2017, Butler participated within Global Mixed Gender Basketball (GMGB), which is the first professional basketball league to support unified play between men and women, by being a color commentator for games. He also owns a team in the newly developed league known as the Wisconsin Cheeseheads. That same year, Butler joined ESPN as full-time college basketball and NBA analyst. In 2018, he joined FS1 as an NBA analyst.

In 2022, Butler co-wrote Shot Clock, a young adult fiction novel, with Jason A. Reynolds. A sequel, Clutch Time, was published in 2024, and was nominated for the NAACP Image Award for Outstanding Literary Work – Youth/Teens.

== Personal life ==
Butler is a Christian. After being sent to a juvenile institution, he began to change his life by reading Bible verses. Butler began taking his interest in basketball seriously when he looked out his window at a basketball court at Ethan Allen Juvenile Detention. Butler spoke of it saying, "God puts stuff in front of you for a reason." He also said, "God put his hands on my life. [God] said, 'I'm going to touch you so that you can touch others.'"

Butler attended a surprise birthday party for Anthony Fadel, a 16-year-old in the Washington, D.C. area when invited by the boy's family. The party was held in May 2007, and the event was primarily reported by blogs, since Wizards' PR purposely did not cover the event to preserve the sincerity of Butler's gesture.

After working at Burger King in his youth, Butler now owns six of the fast-food restaurants across the United States. He has taken Business Management classes at Duke University.

Butler is the son of Mattie Claybrook Paden. His father left him when he was born to join the Marines. His mother married Melvin, and Butler has younger brother, Melvin III.

Caron and Andrea Pink Butler met at UConn's pre-college summer program. After their sophomore year, they traveled to Las Vegas in 2005 and got married. Butler has a daughter and son from a previous relationship. He and Andrea have three daughters together.

== NBA career statistics ==
Legend
GP	Games played	GS	Games started	MPG	Minutes per game
FG%	Field goal percentage	3P%	3-point field goal percentage	FT%	Free throw percentage
RPG	Rebounds per game	APG	Assists per game	SPG	Steals per game
BPG	Blocks per game	PPG	Points per game	**Bold**	Career high
†	Won an NBA championship

=== Regular season ===
Year	Team	GP	GS	MPG	FG%	3P%	FT%	RPG	APG	SPG	BPG	PPG
2002–03	Miami	**78**	**78**	36.6	.416	.318	.824	5.1	2.7	1.8	**.4**	15.4
2003–04	Miami	68	56	29.9	.380	.238	.756	4.8	1.9	1.1	.2	9.2
2004–05	L.A. Lakers	77	77	35.7	.445	.304	.862	5.8	1.9	1.4	.3	15.5
2005–06	Washington	75	54	36.1	.455	.342	.870	6.2	2.5	1.7	.2	17.6
2006–07	Washington	63	63	39.3	.463	.250	.863	**7.4**	3.7	2.1	.3	19.1
2007–08	Washington	58	58	**39.9**	**.466**	.357	.901	6.7	**4.9**	**2.2**	.3	20.3
2008–09	Washington	67	67	38.6	.453	.310	.858	6.2	4.3	1.6	.3	**20.8**
2009–10	Washington	47	47	39.4	.422	.263	.877	6.7	2.3	1.4	.3	16.9
2009–10	Dallas	27	27	34.4	.440	.340	.760	5.4	1.8	1.8	.3	15.2
2010–11†	Dallas	29	29	29.9	.450	**.431**	.773	4.1	1.6	1.0	.3	15.0
2011–12	L.A. Clippers	63	63	29.7	.407	.358	.813	3.7	1.2	.8	.1	12.0
2012–13	L.A. Clippers	**78**	**78**	24.1	.424	.388	.833	2.9	1.0	.7	.1	10.4
2013–14	Milwaukee	34	13	24.1	.387	.361	.839	4.6	1.6	.7	.3	11.0
2013–14	Oklahoma City	22	0	27.2	.409	.441	.842	3.2	1.2	1.1	.3	9.7
2014–15	Detroit	**78**	21	20.8	.407	.379	**.902**	2.5	1.0	.6	.1	5.9
2015–16	Sacramento	17	1	10.4	.424	.167	.833	1.3	0.6	.5	.1	3.7
Career		881	732	32.2	.434	.348	.847	5.0	2.3	1.3	.2	14.1
All-Star		1	0	16.0	.143	.000	.000	4.0	1.0	.0	.0	2.0

=== Playoffs ===
Year	Team	GP	GS	MPG	FG%	3P%	FT%	RPG	APG	SPG	BPG	PPG
2004	Miami	13	**13**	39.3	.386	.182	.825	8.5	2.4	**2.2**	.5	12.8
2006	Washington	6	6	**43.7**	.416	.214	.828	**10.5**	2.7	2.0	.7	18.5
2008	Washington	6	6	41.0	.460	.238	.871	5.7	**3.8**	1.8	.2	18.7
2010	Dallas	6	6	33.7	.434	.304	.926	5.8	1.3	1.5	**.8**	**19.7**
2012	L.A. Clippers	10	10	26.8	.359	.258	.750	3.0	1.0	.6	.2	8.6
2013	L.A. Clippers	6	6	22.7	**.478**	.250	**1.000**	2.7	.0	.3	.3	8.5
2014	Oklahoma City	**17**	2	23.8	.333	**.368**	.800	3.2	.9	.2	.1	6.5
Career		64	49	31.7	.401	.289	.840	5.3	1.6	1.1	.3	11.8
