= Eddie Jones (basketball) =

American basketball player (born 1971)

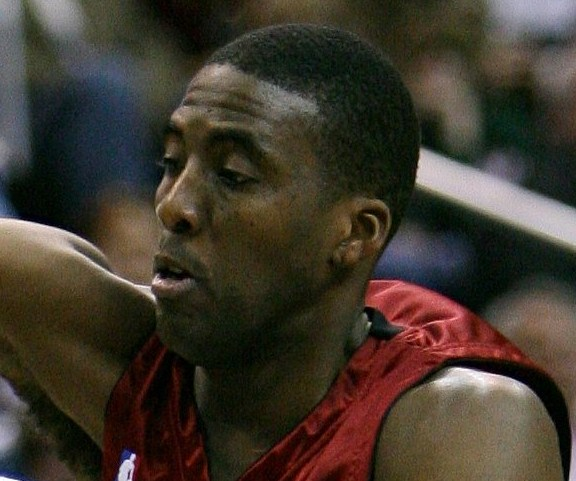
- Jones with the Miami Heat in 2007

Personal information
- Born: October 20, 1971 (age 55) Pompano Beach, Florida, U.S.
- Listed height: 6 ft 6 in (1.98 m)
- Listed weight: 200 lb (91 kg)

Career information
- High school: Blanche Ely (Pompano Beach, Florida)
- College: Temple (1991–1994)
- NBA draft: 1994: 1st round, 10th overall pick
- Drafted by: Los Angeles Lakers
- Playing career: 1994–2008
- Position: Shooting guard / small forward
- Number: 25, 6

Career history
- 1994–1999: Los Angeles Lakers
- 1999–2000: Charlotte Hornets
- 2000–2005: Miami Heat
- 2005–2007: Memphis Grizzlies
- 2007: Miami Heat
- 2007–2008: Dallas Mavericks

Career highlights
- 3× NBA All-Star (1997, 1998, 2000); All-NBA Third Team (2000); 3× NBA All-Defensive Second Team (1998–2000); NBA All-Rookie First Team (1995); NBA steals leader (2000); Atlantic 10 Player of the Year (1994); Robert V. Geasey Trophy winner (1994)

Career NBA statistics
- Points: 14,155 (14.8 ppg)
- Rebounds: 3,857 (4.0 rpg)
- Steals: 1,620 (1.7 spg)
- Stats at NBA.com
- Stats at Basketball Reference
Medals
Men's basketball
Representing United States
FIBA U21 World Championship
Gold medal – first place	1993 Valladolid	National team

Edward Charles Jones (born October 20, 1971) is an American former professional basketball player who played for five teams in his 14-year National Basketball Association (NBA) career.

Jones played college basketball for the Temple Owls and was the 1993–94 Atlantic 10 Player of the Year. He led the Owls to the Elite 8 in the NCAA tournament. The three-time NBA All-Star was selected 10th overall in the 1994 NBA draft by the Los Angeles Lakers.

== College career ==
Jones played college basketball for Temple from 1991 to 1994. In his junior season, he led them to the Elite Eight of the NCAA Tournament, and in his final season with the Owls he averaged 19.2 points. In 1994, he was named Atlantic 10 Player of the Year.

== Professional career ==
=== Los Angeles Lakers (1994–1999) ===
The Los Angeles Lakers selected Jones with the 10th overall selection in the 1994 NBA draft. Lakers general manager Jerry West stated, "We wanted the best pure athlete available, and Eddie was too good to pass up".

In his rookie season Jones averaged 14.0 points per game and 2.05 steals per game as he played in 64 games, 58 of which he started. He also led the NBA in steal/turnover ratio (1.75), placed 4th in the NBA Rookie of the Year ballot, and was on the 1994–95 NBA All-Rookie First Team. In the 94–95 All-Star weekend Rookie Challenge he won the MVP, posting a game-high 25 points, 6 steals, and 4 rebounds. With his combination of size, athleticism, and defense, Jones began to draw favorable comparisons to another former Lakers great, Michael Cooper. (Cooper himself said that looking at Jones on the court was like "looking in a mirror.") Jones would become an integral part of the Lakers squad, along with Nick Van Exel and Cedric Ceballos as the Lakers made the playoffs and upset the Seattle SuperSonics in the first round 3–1 before facing the top-seeded San Antonio Spurs led by league MVP David Robinson. The younger Lakers managed to push the Spurs to six games before losing the series, with Jones averaging 8.7 points off the bench in his first playoff run.

The following year featured Jones solidifying his position as the team's starting shooting guard, as Jones started 66 of 70 games and averaged 12.8 points a game for the season. The Lakers improved their total record to 53 wins, bolstered by the midseason return of franchise legend Magic Johnson out of retirement. The Lakers made the playoffs again, but could not defeat the defending NBA champion Houston Rockets, who defeated the Lakers 3–1 in the first round. Jones averaged 17.3 points in the series.

After his second season, Jones switched from number 25 to 6, as the Lakers had retired 25 for Gail Goodrich. He selected 6 as growing up he was a fan of Julius Erving. In the off-season, the team acquired superstar center Shaquille O'Neal, and traded Vlade Divac to the Hornets for rookie guard Kobe Bryant. Jones played and started in 80 games, placing second in the team in scoring with 17.2 points and fourth in the league in steals with 2.4 a game. He also played in his first NBA All-Star Game, scoring 10 points in 17 minutes in the 1997 NBA All-Star Game. Led by O'Neal, the Lakers won 56 games before defeating the Portland Trail Blazers in the first round of the playoffs, but fell to the top-seeded Utah Jazz in five games in the conference semifinals. Jones struggled in the playoffs, as his scoring average fell to 11.2 in the postseason.

In the 1997–98 season, Jones averaged 16.9 points with 2 steals a game, and scored 15 points with 11 rebounds in the 1998 NBA All-Star Game. His pesky defense also earned him a selection to the NBA All-Defensive Second Team. The Lakers won 61 games and defeated Portland and Seattle in the first and second round of the playoffs. The team failed to win a game in the conference finals against the Jazz, however, as the veteran team swept the Lakers. Jones averaged 17 points with 2 steals in 13 playoff games.

=== Charlotte Hornets (1999–2000) ===
The following season would be shortened to 50 games due to a league lockout, with Jones starting the first 20 games of the season before he and Elden Campbell were traded to the Charlotte Hornets for Glen Rice, J. R. Reid, and B. J. Armstrong on March 10, 1999. Jones started in 30 games for the remainder of the season with the Hornets, who did not make the playoffs, but Jones placed second in the league in steals with 2.5 a game and made the All-Defensive team for the second straight year.

Jones's following campaign with the Hornets, the 1999–2000 season, was his finest statistically, as he averaged 20.1 points, led the league in total steals (192) and steals per game (2.7) along with 4.2 assists and 4.8 rebounds per game. Jones was also voted to start at guard for the Eastern Conference in the 2000 NBA All-Star Game and scored 10 points in 21 minutes. The Hornets won 49 games and made the playoffs, losing in the first round to the Philadelphia 76ers in four games. At the end of the season, Jones was named to the All-NBA Third Team for the first time and was named to his third straight All-Defensive second team.

Jones became a free agent after the 2000 season, and talked with the Chicago Bulls and Orlando Magic, but wanted to play for his hometown of Miami.

=== Miami Heat (2000–2005) ===
After re-signing with the Hornets, Jones was traded with Anthony Mason, Ricky Davis and Dale Ellis to the Miami Heat for Otis Thorpe, Rodney Buford, Jamal Mashburn, Tim James and P. J. Brown. Jones' rerouting was a sign-and-trade. The acquisition of Jones was an attempt by Heat coach Pat Riley to improve his team into a title contender. Before the start of the 2000–01 season however, the team's star center Alonzo Mourning was diagnosed with a rare kidney disease, meaning Jones would have to carry the team's offensive load even more than originally intended. He would go on to play consistently at both ends of the floor, however, averaging 17.4 points a game and leading the team in scoring despite only playing in 63 games for the season. Jones and Mason led the team to 50 wins, and Mourning returned in late March, but the Heat were swept in the first round of the playoffs to the sixth-seeded Hornets, despite Jones averaging 19 points in the three-game series.

Mourning returned to full action in the 2001–02 season, and Jones started 81 games for the team and led in scoring again with 18.3 points a game. The Heat failed to make the playoffs however, and with Mourning's disease returning he would be left out of the entire 2002–03 season, forcing Miami to enter a rebuilding phase. Jones only played in 47 contests in the 2003 season due to his own injuries, but once again led the team in scoring with 18.5 points a game. In the off-season, Riley revamped the roster, as Mourning left to join the New Jersey Nets while Miami drafted Dwyane Wade and acquired Lamar Odom from the Los Angeles Clippers to join Jones and second year player Caron Butler. Riley also stepped down as coach just before the season started, with longtime assistant Stan Van Gundy taking the helm.

Despite starting the season 0–7, the 2003–04 season proved to be a success for Miami, with Jones sharing a balanced offensive attack with Wade, Butler and Odom but still leading the team in overall scoring with 17.3 points a game. Jones finished 3rd in the league in total three point field goals, and Miami finished the season with a 42–40 record to make the playoffs with the fourth seed in the East. The Heat would go on to defeat the New Orleans Hornets in a difficult 7-game series in the first round in which the home team won each game, before losing in six games to the top-seeded Indiana Pacers in the conference semifinals. Jones averaged 13.2 in the postseason.

In the off-season prior to the 2004–05 season, Miami made major roster changes, trading Odom and Butler along with center Brian Grant for Shaquille O'Neal, Jones's old Lakers teammate. Although Jones started the season at the shooting guard position, he would move to the small forward position with Wade taking over as the team's starting shooting guard. The result was a blossoming season for Wade combined with the dominating presence of O'Neal. Jones saw his scoring output dip to 12.7 points a game, but he remained a crucial 3 point shooting option for Miami as the team won 59 games and the top seed in the Eastern Conference. Near the end of the season the Heat also brought back Alonzo Mourning, and the team would sweep New Jersey and the Washington Wizards in the playoffs before facing the defending NBA champion Detroit Pistons. The Heat took a 3–2 series lead after five games, but faced difficulties with an injury to Wade, and the Pistons rallied to win game 6 in Detroit and game 7 in Miami. Jones averaged 13.7 points throughout the playoffs.

=== Memphis Grizzlies (2005–2007) ===
Miami was disappointed to have just missed a chance to make the NBA Finals, and Riley decided to part ways with Jones after five seasons as he was dealt to the Memphis Grizzlies for James Posey and Jason Williams on August 2, 2005, in a record five-team, thirteen-player trade. On November 4, 2005, Jones scored a game-leading 25 points as the Grizzlies beat the Orlando Magic 94–85. His first season in Memphis, Jones started in 75 games in total, averaging 11.8 points with 1.7 steals a game as the Grizzlies made the playoffs but were swept in the first round by the Dallas Mavericks. Jones started in 14 of 29 games the following year for the Grizzlies, before getting waived by the team on January 30, 2007.

=== Return to Miami (2007) ===
On February 1, 2007, Jones signed a minimum contract for his second stint with the Miami Heat, playing increasing minutes after Wade's shoulder injury. The Heat had won the NBA title the previous year, but struggled throughout the season with injuries to Wade, as Miami fell in a four-game sweep to the Chicago Bulls in the first round.

=== Dallas Mavericks (2007–2008) ===
After the 2006–07 season ended, Jones became an unrestricted free agent. On August 3, 2007, Jones agreed to a two-year deal with the Dallas Mavericks.

On October 10, 2008, Jones was traded to the Indiana Pacers. After being traded to the Pacers, Jones had his contract renegotiated which enabled him to pursue playing for another team or retire. On October 16, 2008, he was released from the Pacers in order for them to free up cap room.

== Media and endorsements ==
Jones appeared in a comical Taco Bell commercial that features several people who were related to the Lakers organization at the time. The commercial focuses on Shaquille O'Neal suffering from Taco Neck Syndrome. Along with Michael Finley, Jones appeared in a commercial for the Air Jordan XVI.

Jones was the cover athlete for the 989 Sports basketball game NBA ShootOut '97. He was also one of the original players chosen to endorse Air Jordan, and wear the "Jordan XI". Jones appeared on the sitcom In the House.

On June 8, 2009, Jones was featured in the Spike TV show called Pros vs. Joes. As one of the pros, he was teamed with his former Miami Heat teammates Alonzo Mourning and Antoine Walker.

== Personal life ==
Jones and his wife Trina have three children together. Jones is a cousin of Jalen Suggs of the Orlando Magic and Tyrese Haliburton of the Indiana Pacers.

== NBA career statistics ==
Legend
GP	Games played	GS	Games started	MPG	Minutes per game
FG%	Field goal percentage	3P%	3-point field goal percentage	FT%	Free throw percentage
RPG	Rebounds per game	APG	Assists per game	SPG	Steals per game
BPG	Blocks per game	PPG	Points per game	**Bold**	Career high
*	Led the league

=== Regular season ===
Year	Team	GP	GS	MPG	FG%	3P%	FT%	RPG	APG	SPG	BPG	PPG
1994–95	L.A. Lakers	64	58	31.0	.460	.370	.722	3.9	2.0	2.0	.6	14.0
1995–96	L.A. Lakers	70	66	31.2	**.492**	.366	.739	3.3	3.5	1.8	.6	12.8
1996–97	L.A. Lakers	80	80	37.5	.438	.391	.819	4.1	3.4	2.4	.6	17.2
1997–98	L.A. Lakers	80	80	36.4	.484	.389	.765	3.8	3.1	2.0	.7	16.9
1998–99	L.A. Lakers	20*	20*	36.2	.423	.313	.738	3.8	3.1	1.8	**1.2**	13.6
1998–99	Charlotte	30*	30*	38.6	.446	.359	.801	3.9	**4.2**	**3.0**	1.1	17.0
1999–2000	Charlotte	72	72	**39.0**	.427	.375	**.864**	4.8	**4.2**	2.7*	.7	**20.1**
2000–01	Miami	63	58	36.2	.445	.378	.844	4.6	2.7	1.7	.9	17.4
2001–02	Miami	**81**	**81**	**39.0**	.432	.390	.837	4.7	3.2	1.4	1.0	18.3
2002–03	Miami	47	47	38.1	.423	**.407**	.822	4.8	3.7	1.4	.7	18.5
2003–04	Miami	**81**	**81**	37.0	.409	.370	.835	3.8	3.2	1.1	.4	17.3
2004–05	Miami	80	80	35.5	.428	.372	.806	**5.1**	2.7	1.1	.5	12.7
2005–06	Memphis	75	75	32.5	.404	.356	.781	3.7	2.4	1.7	.4	11.8
2006–07	Memphis	29	14	19.3	.377	.297	.735	2.1	1.1	.8	.1	5.6
2006–07	Miami	35	27	29.5	.446	.378	.829	3.7	2.2	1.3	.2	9.5
2007–08	Dallas	47	33	19.6	.367	.293	.714	2.8	1.5	.6	.2	3.7
Career		954	902	34.4	.437	.373	.809	4.0	2.9	1.7	.6	14.8
All-Star		3	1	21.0	.467	.182	.556	5.3	1.7	1.3	.7	11.7

=== Playoffs ===
Year	Team	GP	GS	MPG	FG%	3P%	FT%	RPG	APG	SPG	BPG	PPG
1995	L.A. Lakers	10	0	28.6	.375	.444	.714	3.2	2.0	.8	.9	8.7
1996	L.A. Lakers	4	4	38.8	**.551**	**.526**	.625	5.3	1.5	2.0	.3	17.3
1997	L.A. Lakers	9	9	31.4	.458	.375	.743	3.4	3.2	1.0	.4	11.2
1998	L.A. Lakers	13	13	36.6	.466	.417	.829	3.9	2.5	2.0	**1.6**	17.0
2000	Charlotte	4	4	**42.8**	.379	.346	.938	5.0	**4.8**	**2.5**	.8	17.0
2001	Miami	3	3	36.0	.500	.438	.857	**6.0**	2.3	1.0	.3	**19.0**
2004	Miami	13	13	36.8	.366	.299	.800	3.6	2.2	1.4	.8	13.2
2005	Miami	**15**	**15**	40.1	.455	.400	.738	5.8	2.6	1.2	.6	13.7
2006	Memphis	4	3	29.8	.483	.429	.667	2.8	2.5	.8	.3	10.3
2007	Miami	3	2	22.0	.222	.167	.833	2.0	1.7	.3	.3	3.3
2008	Dallas	3	0	7.3	.333	.250	**1.000**	1.0	.3	.3	.0	2.0
Career		81	66	34.1	.433	.383	.783	4.0	2.4	1.3	.8	12.8

== See also ==
- List of National Basketball Association career steals leaders
- List of National Basketball Association career 3-point scoring leaders
- List of National Basketball Association single-game steals leaders
