= Georgetown Junior/Senior High School =

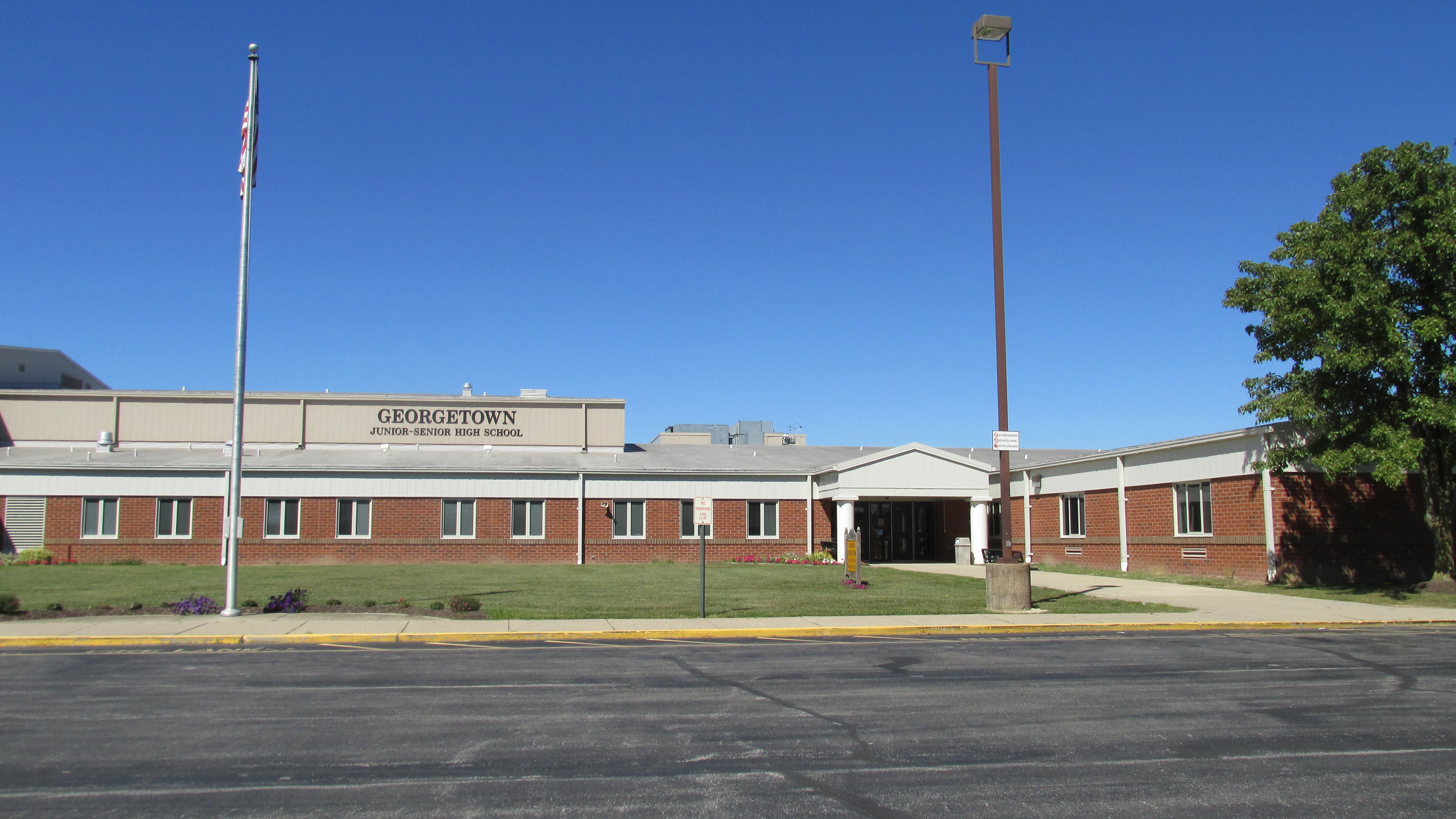

Location
- 987 Mt. Orab Pike; Georgetown Ohio; Georgetown, (Brown County), Ohio 45121; United States
- Coordinates: 38°52′51″N 83°54′4″W

Information
- Type: Public, Coeducational high school
- Superintendent: Brad Winterod
- Principal: Mr. Matt Cameron
- Teaching staff: 27.00 (FTE)
- Grades: 7-12
- Student to teacher ratio: 14.63
- Colors: Black and Gold
- Athletics conference: Southern Buckeye Athletic/Academic Conference
- Sports: Soccer, Basketball, Cross Country, Track, Golf, Baseball, Softball, Volleyball, Academics
- Mascot: G-Man
- Team name: G-Men
- Accreditation: North Central Association of Colleges and Schools
- Website: www.gtown.k12.oh.us

Georgetown Junior/Senior High School (formerly Georgetown High School) is a public high school in Georgetown, Ohio, United States. It is the only high school in the Georgetown Exempted Village School district.

== Athletics ==
=== Ohio High School Athletic Association State Championships ===
- Boys Basketball – 2007
- Boys Cross Country - 1969
