= Lamar Odom =

American basketball player (born 1979)

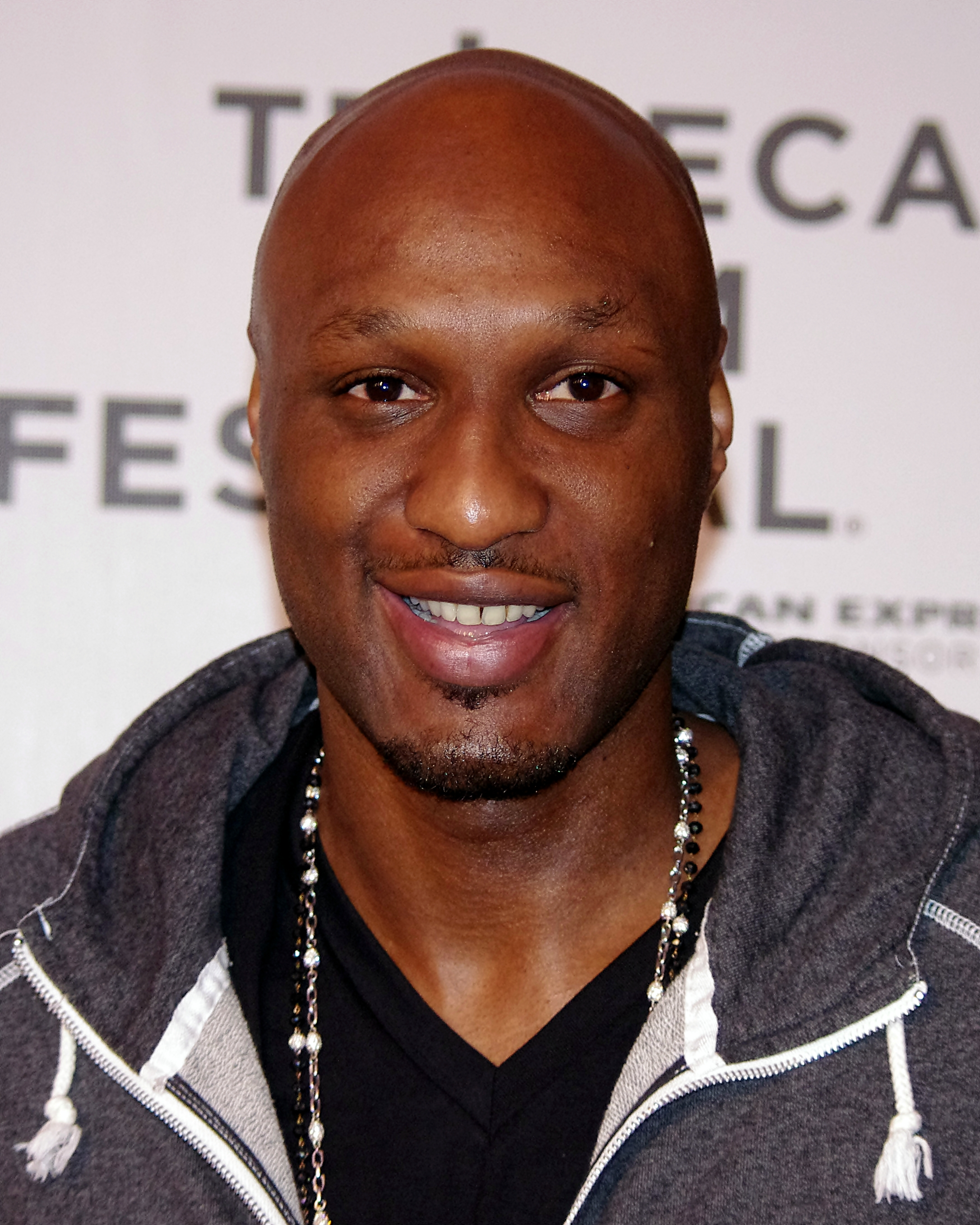
- Odom in 2012

Personal information
- Born: November 6, 1979 (age 47) Queens, New York City, U.S.
- Listed height: 6 ft 10 in (2.08 m)
- Listed weight: 230 lb (104 kg)

Career information
- High school: Christ the King (Queens, New York); Redemption (Troy, New York); St. Thomas Aquinas (New Britain, Connecticut)
- College: Rhode Island (1998–1999)
- NBA draft: 1999: 1st round, 4th overall pick
- Drafted by: Los Angeles Clippers
- Playing career: 1999–2014
- Position: Power forward / small forward
- Number: 7

Career history
- 1999–2003: Los Angeles Clippers
- 2003–2004: Miami Heat
- 2004–2011: Los Angeles Lakers
- 2011–2012: Dallas Mavericks
- 2012–2013: Los Angeles Clippers
- 2014: Laboral Kutxa Baskonia

Career highlights
- 2× NBA champion (2009, 2010); NBA Sixth Man of the Year (2011); NBA All-Rookie First Team (2000); First-team All-Atlantic 10 (1999); Atlantic 10 Rookie of the Year (1999); Atlantic 10 Tournament MVP (1999); McDonald's All-American (1997); Parade Player of the Year (1997); 2× First-team Parade All-American (1996, 1997)

Career statistics
- Points: 12,781 (13.3 ppg)
- Rebounds: 8,059 (8.4 rpg)
- Assists: 3,554 (3.7 apg)
- Stats at NBA.com
- Stats at Basketball Reference
Medals
Representing USA
Men's basketball
Summer Olympics
Bronze medal – third place	2004 Athens	National team
FIBA World Championship
Gold medal – first place	2010 Turkey	National team

Lamar Joseph Odom (born November 6, 1979) is an American former professional basketball player who played for four teams during his 14-year career in the National Basketball Association (NBA), and won back-to-back championships in 2009 and 2010 with the Los Angeles Lakers. He was also named NBA Sixth Man of the Year in 2011.

In high school, Odom received national player of the year honors from Parade in 1997. He played college basketball for the University of Rhode Island, earning all-conference honors during his only season in the Atlantic 10 Conference before turning professional. The Los Angeles Clippers selected Odom with the fourth overall pick in the first round of the 1999 NBA draft. He was named to the NBA All-Rookie Team in the following year; it was during his four seasons with the Clippers, however, that he was twice suspended for violating the league's anti-drug policy. As a restricted free agent, he then signed with the Miami Heat, where he played the 2003–04 season before being traded to the Lakers. Odom spent seven seasons with the Lakers, who traded him to the Dallas Mavericks in 2011. After the move, his career declined. He was traded back to the Clippers in 2012 and played briefly in Spain in 2014.

Odom played on the United States national team, winning a bronze medal in the Olympics in 2004 and a gold medal in the FIBA World Championship (later known as the World Cup) in 2010.

Odom was married to Khloé Kardashian from 2009 to 2016. During their marriage, Odom made several appearances on the reality television show Keeping Up with the Kardashians. He and Kardashian also had their own reality series, Khloé & Lamar. In October 2015, Odom was hospitalized in a comatose state after being discovered unconscious in a Nevada brothel. He later sought treatment for drug and alcohol addiction.

== Early life ==
Odom was born in South Jamaica, Queens, to Joe Odom and Cathy Mercer. His father was a heroin addict. His mother died of colon cancer when he was 12 years old. On her deathbed, she reportedly told him: "Be nice to everybody." Odom was afterwards raised by his maternal grandmother, Mildred Mercer.

In his first three years of high school, Odom played for Christ the King Regional High School in Middle Village, Queens. He left the school at the start of his senior year due to poor grades, transferring first to Redemption Christian Academy in Troy, New York, and then to the now-defunct St. Thomas Aquinas High School in New Britain, Connecticut, where he was coached by Jerry DeGregorio. As a senior, Odom was recognized nationally as the Parade Player of the Year in 1997. Among other distinctions, he earned USA Today All-USA First Team honors and was named to the Parade All-American First Team for the second consecutive year. While still in high school, Odom played on the same AAU team as future NBA teammates Elton Brand and Ron Artest (later known as Metta World Peace); he also played at the Adidas ABCD Camp with future Lakers teammate Kobe Bryant. Adidas executive Sonny Vaccaro commented at the time that Odom possessed a "$2 million smile".

== College career ==
Though he considered entering the NBA directly from high school and consulted Kobe Bryant as a player who had made that jump, Odom ultimately decided that he was not ready and committed to the University of Nevada at Las Vegas instead. However, a Sports Illustrated story questioning the validity of his ACT score and an arrest for soliciting prostitution provided the school cause enough to revoke his scholarship, and for this reason, he never played for the Runnin' Rebels. To the university's further embarrassment, an investigation by the NCAA would later reveal that Odom had received $5,600 in illicit payments from one of its boosters, resulting in the firing of Coach Bill Bayno and UNLV being placed on probation for four years.

Odom transferred to the University of Rhode Island, with the cost of his room and board being covered by funds his father received from the G.I. Bill. Since he was admitted as a non-matriculating student, Odom was forced to sit out the 1997–98 season. After two semesters and a summer session, however, Odom earned his eligibility to play intramural basketball. His career at Rhode Island had been in some jeopardy during his first semester after he once vanished before finals; that is until coach Jim Harrick prevailed upon three of his four instructors to let him make up his extant work. The coach also had Odom work alongside DeGregorio, who had become a Rams assistant and ended up being the player's closest friend in college. Odom also drew inspiration from the example of his maternal grandmother, a nurse who had raised five children and returned to school to earn her degree in 1980 at the age of 56.

Odom played one season (1998–99) for Rhode Island, during which he averaged 17.6 points per game and led the Rams to the conference championship. He earned First Team All-Conference honors and was named the Atlantic 10 Rookie of the Year. He was named the most valuable player of the Atlantic 10 tournament after his three-point shot at the buzzer against Temple gave the Rams their first A-10 title.

== Professional career ==
=== Los Angeles Clippers (1999–2003) ===
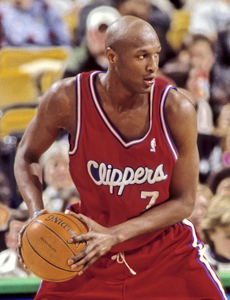
Odom with the Clippers

Odom declared his eligibility for the 1999 NBA draft after his freshman year at Rhode Island. He then tried to return to college, thinking he was not ready for the NBA; but having already signed with an agent, he was no longer eligible to withdraw from the draft. Odom was selected by the Los Angeles Clippers with the fourth overall pick. In his first season with the Clippers, Odom averaged 16.6 points, 7.8 rebounds, and 4.2 assists per game. He put up 30 points and 12 rebounds in his NBA debut. He was named to the 2000 NBA All-Rookie First Team.

In the 2000–01 season, Odom increased his scoring average to 17.2 points a game as he started in 74 games. The Clippers again failed to make the playoffs, however, as the young team could not improve their positioning in the Western Conference. In March 2001, Odom was suspended for five games for violating the terms of the NBA's anti-drug policy. In the following season, he was suspended in November for yet another infraction of the anti-drug policy, his second offense in eight months. He admitted to using marijuana after the suspension. Odom only played 29 games during the season, and his production slipped.

He would only play in 49 games during the 2002–03 season, and would become a restricted free agent the following summer. The Miami Heat offered a deal that the Clippers declined to match after already matching another offer the Heat made to Elton Brand.

=== Miami Heat (2003–2004) ===
The Heat had won only 25 games the previous season but had drafted young talent such as Dwyane Wade and Caron Butler. Odom was brought on to play as the team's starting power forward. Along with a budding Wade and the veteran Eddie Jones, Odom shared the scoring load, scoring 17.1 points to go with a career-high 9.7 rebounds per game. Despite an inauspicious start to the season where they lost seven consecutive games, the Heat ended up playing much better and even competing for a seed in the playoffs. On March 6, Odom posted a triple-double, scoring 30 points with 19 rebounds and 11 assists in a home win over the Sacramento Kings. The Heat would go on to clinch the fourth seed in the playoffs and face off against the New Orleans Hornets in the first round. Each team won at home, but the Heat would win a seventh deciding game to advance to the second round and face a top-seeded Indiana Pacers team. The Pacers won the first two games in Indiana, but the Heat responded with two consecutive home wins, including a game 4 victory that was led by Odom's 22 points, however the Pacers' breadth of experience proved too much for the younger Heat; the Pacers claimed games 5 and 6 to win the series. All in all, Odom had a solid season compared to his previous one with the Clippers.

After the season, Odom was traded in a package with Caron Butler and Brian Grant to the Los Angeles Lakers for All-Star Shaquille O'Neal.

=== Los Angeles Lakers (2004–2011) ===
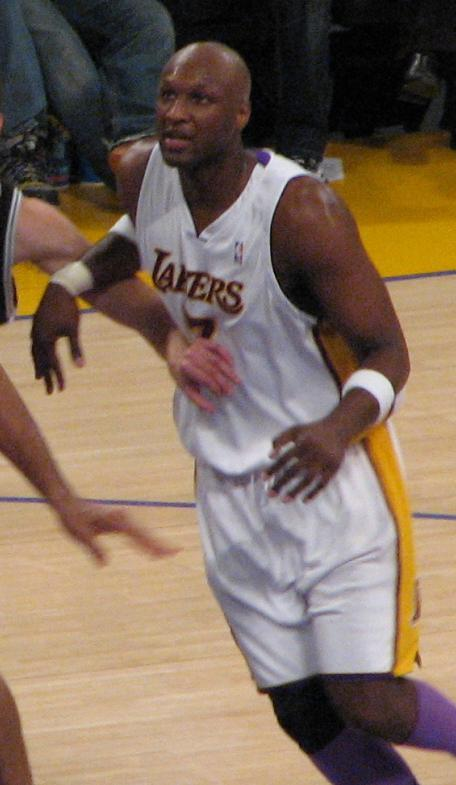
Odom in a Lakers vs Spurs game in 2007

In his first year with the Los Angeles Lakers, Odom incurred a left shoulder injury that forced him to miss the end of the 2004–05 season. Despite Odom averaging 15.2 points and a career-high 10.2 rebounds, the Lakers finished out of the playoffs for only the 5th time in franchise history. Following the 2004–05 season, they re-hired former coach Phil Jackson.

In the first half of the 2005–06 season, Odom showed signs of inconsistency. However, as Los Angeles progressed towards the end of the season, his performance steadily improved. Along the way, he posted consecutive triple-doubles for the first time as a Laker in games against the Golden State Warriors and the Portland Trail Blazers. The Lakers were eliminated in 7 games in their first round playoffs matchup against the Phoenix Suns, having blown a 3–1 series lead. Odom averaged 14.8 points and 9.2 rebounds during the season and increased his scoring (19.1) and rebounds (11) in seven playoff contests.

Battling injuries, Odom was limited to 56 games in 2006–07, but finished with an average of 15.9 points and 9.8 rebounds per game. In a rematch of the previous year's series, the Lakers were again defeated by the Suns in the first round of the 2007 NBA Playoffs.

After young center Andrew Bynum had gone down with a knee injury and Pau Gasol was acquired amid the 2007–08 season, Odom stepped up his production, as he posted averages of 15.3 points, 12 rebounds, and 4 assists across 36 games. He would finish that season averaging 14.2 points, 10.6 rebounds, and 3.5 assists per contest. In the 2008 NBA Finals, however, his numbers would decline to 13.5 points, 9 rebounds, and 3 assists per game, with the Lakers falling to the Boston Celtics.

In 2008–09, Odom arrived to training camp out of shape. Jackson later disclosed his plan to move Odom to the bench as their sixth man, backing up the Lakers' frontcourt consisting of Gasol, Bynum, and Trevor Ariza. A free agent after the season, Odom initially balked at the prospect of playing as a reserve for the first time in his career. But he came around to the assignment soon enough, having resolved to sacrifice his own numbers to make his teammates happy and in hopes of securing his first NBA championship. In January, after Bynum got injured in a game against the Memphis Grizzlies, Odom returned to the starting lineup. Over the month of February, he averaged 16.5 points and 13.4 rebounds while playing 36 minutes a night. This February run included a standout performance at the Quicken Loans Arena in Cleveland. The 15 points Odom scored in the third quarter helped the Lakers turn a 12-point deficit to a 10-point victory, ending Cleveland's 23-game home winning streak in the process. Odom finished the game with 28 points, 17 rebounds, and 2 assists.

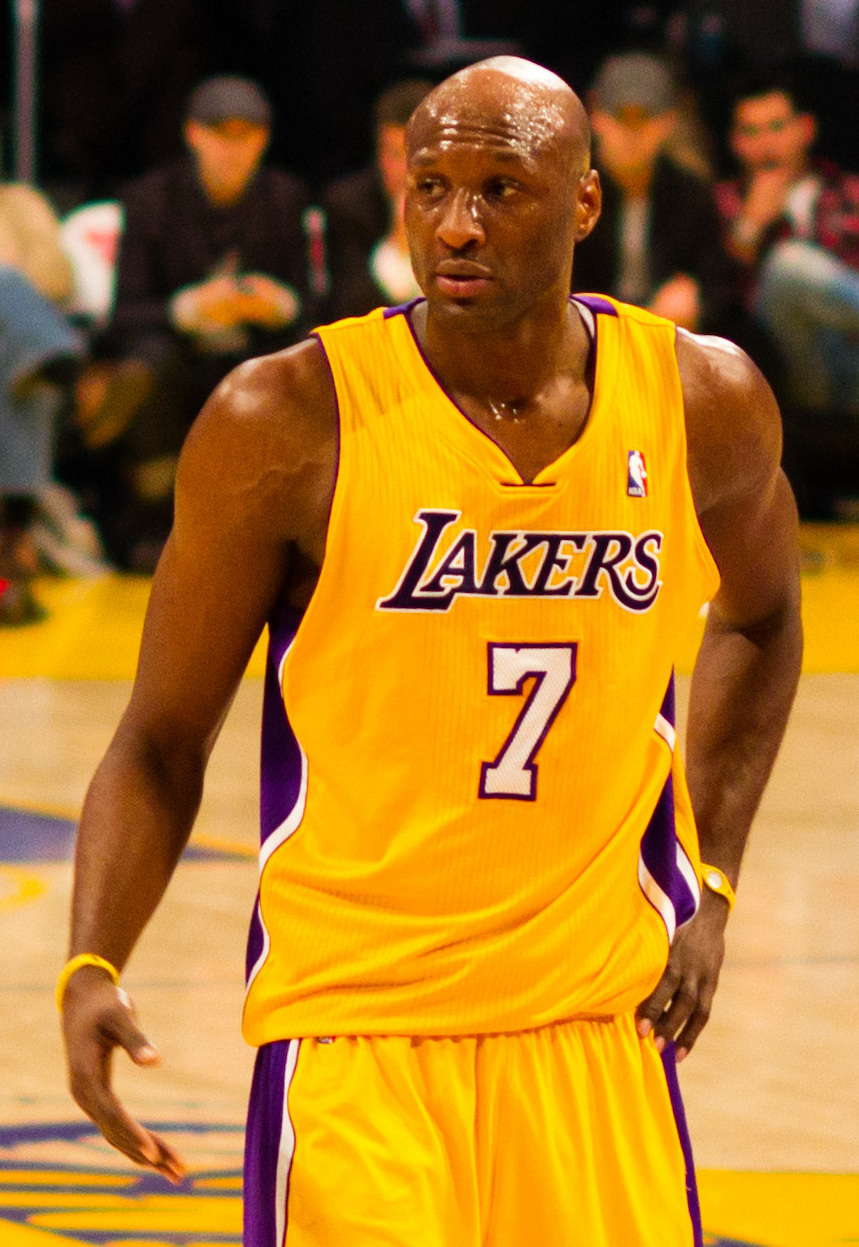
Odom in 2011, when he was named NBA Sixth Man of the Year

When Bynum returned to the hardwood for a home game against the Denver Nuggets, on April 9, Odom adjusted back into his sixth-man role. Odom finished the season with 11.3 points, 8.2 rebounds, 2.6 assists, 1.0 steals, and 1.3 blocks with 29.7 minutes per contest. He won his first NBA championship when the Lakers defeated the Orlando Magic in the 2009 NBA Finals.

Over the 2009 offseason, Odom was heavily courted by his former franchise, the Miami Heat. Despite pleas from Heat guard Dwyane Wade and Heat executive Pat Riley, Kobe Bryant was optimistic that Odom would return to Los Angeles, reasoning that he would prefer to team up with newly acquired asset and fellow New Yorker Ron Artest. On July 31, 2009, after a month of tedious negotiations, the Lakers announced that they had made a four-year, $33 million deal with Odom. The investment paid off as Odom would play a crucial role for the Lakers on their way to another NBA Championship, with the team winning over the Boston Celtics in the 2010 NBA Finals.

Odom continued his strong play for the Lakers with another solid season in 2010–11, as he posted career-highs in both three-point shooting percentage (.382) and overall field goal percentage (.530). He started 35 games in Bynum's absence during the season and averaged 16.3 points and 10.2 rebounds in those games. In 47 games off the bench, Odom averaged 13.5 points, 7.5 rebounds in 28.4 minutes. Meeting the requirement to come in as a reserve more games than he started, Odom was awarded the NBA Sixth Man of the Year Award, becoming the first player in Lakers history to do so. Bryant called it Odom's most "consistent season".

During the offseason, Odom considered taking a break from basketball after a close cousin of his was murdered and he himself was a passenger in a SUV involved in an accident that killed a teenage cyclist. The car accident had occurred the day after Odom attended his cousin's funeral.

=== Dallas Mavericks (2011–2012) ===
On December 11, 2011, Odom was traded to the Dallas Mavericks, the defending NBA champions, for a first-round draft pick and an $8.9 million trade exception after NBA Commissioner David Stern vetoed a proposed three-team trade that would have sent Odom and Houston Rockets teammates Kevin Martin, Luis Scola, and Goran Dragić to the New Orleans Hornets; Chris Paul to the Lakers; and Pau Gasol to the Houston Rockets. Odom felt "disrespected" after he learned of the Hornets trade publicly, and he requested a trade from the Lakers to another contending team. The Lakers were also concerned that Odom's contract was pricey since he was not needed to initiate the triangle offense with Mike Brown replacing Phil Jackson as Lakers coach.

In January 2012, Sports Illustrated reported that "Odom [had] yet to find his niche in Dallas. His struggles [made] him a frequent target of [Mavericks coach Rick] Carlisle, who [harped] on Odom's need to understand the coverages, be more alert, communicate and get in better shape ... Team sources say Odom ... appeared stressed by what they believe [was] the mental burden of an overwhelming offseason." On March 2, 2012, Odom was assigned to the Texas Legends of the NBA D-League. He had missed the prior three games for personal reasons. His stint with the Legends was canceled on March 3, 2012, and he returned to the Mavs' active roster. On March 24, Odom did not play in a 104–87 loss to the San Antonio Spurs; this was the first time he could remember not playing due to a coach's decision.

On April 9, 2012, it was announced that Odom had parted ways with the Mavericks. Instead of releasing him, the team listed Odom as inactive for the remainder of the season. The move allowed the Mavericks to trade him at the end of the season. In a statement to ESPN, Odom said, "I'm sorry that things didn't work out better for both of us, but I wish the Mavs' organization, my teammates and Dallas fans nothing but continued success in the defense of their championship." Mavericks owner Mark Cuban admitted that a clash between the two during halftime in a game against the Memphis Grizzlies on April 7 was the last straw. Odom reportedly responded angrily when Cuban questioned his commitment, asking if he was "in or out". Odom averaged only 6.6 points in 20.5 minutes along with career lows in shooting percentage (35.2), rebounds (4.2) and assists (1.7).

=== Return to the Clippers (2012–2013) ===
On June 29, 2012, Odom was traded back to the Los Angeles Clippers as part of a four-team deal. The deal sent Odom to the Clippers, the rights to Tadija Dragićević and cash considerations to the Dallas Mavericks, Mo Williams and the draft rights to Shan Foster to the Utah Jazz, and the draft rights to Furkan Aldemir to the Houston Rockets. He played all 82 games of the season for the third time in his career, but only started two of them. Out of shape for half the season, he averaged career lows of 4.0 ppg and 1.7 apg in 19.7 mpg during the season. He also averaged 5.9 rebounds, but shot just 39.9 percent. The Clippers finished 56–26 and won their first-ever Pacific Division title.

In July 2013, Odom became a free agent, but did not land an NBA contract despite some interest from the Clippers in his return. The Lakers also contemplated re-signing him, but both teams committed to other players instead.

=== Laboral Kutxa Baskonia (2014) ===
On February 18, 2014, Odom signed with Laboral Kutxa Baskonia of the Spanish League and the Euroleague on a two-month deal with an option to extend it for the remainder of the season. A month later, he returned to the United States due to a back injury after his personal doctors in New York ruled him unfit to play out his contract. He appeared in just two games for Baskonia.

=== Mighty Sports (2018–2019) ===
On April 16, 2014, Odom signed with the New York Knicks for the remainder of the 2013–14 season, but did not appear in the team's season finale. The Knicks finished with a 37–45 win–loss record and missed the playoffs. On July 11, 2014, he was waived by the Knicks.

Odom planned to enter the Chinese Basketball Association (CBA) in early 2018, but concluded that he was not fit enough. In December 2018, he joined Philippine club Mighty Sports, which was set to play in the 30th Dubai International Basketball Tournament on February 1–9, 2019. The roster included fellow imports Justin Brownlee and Randolph Morris, together with local amateur, former professional and Filipino-American basketball players.

Odom considered his Dubai stint to be preparation for his re-entry to professional basketball, particularly in the Big3, a US-based 3x3 basketball league founded by rapper Ice Cube. He was named a co-captain of the Enemies squad, but struggled in his first game before he was deactivated for the 2019 season by the Big3.

== National team career ==
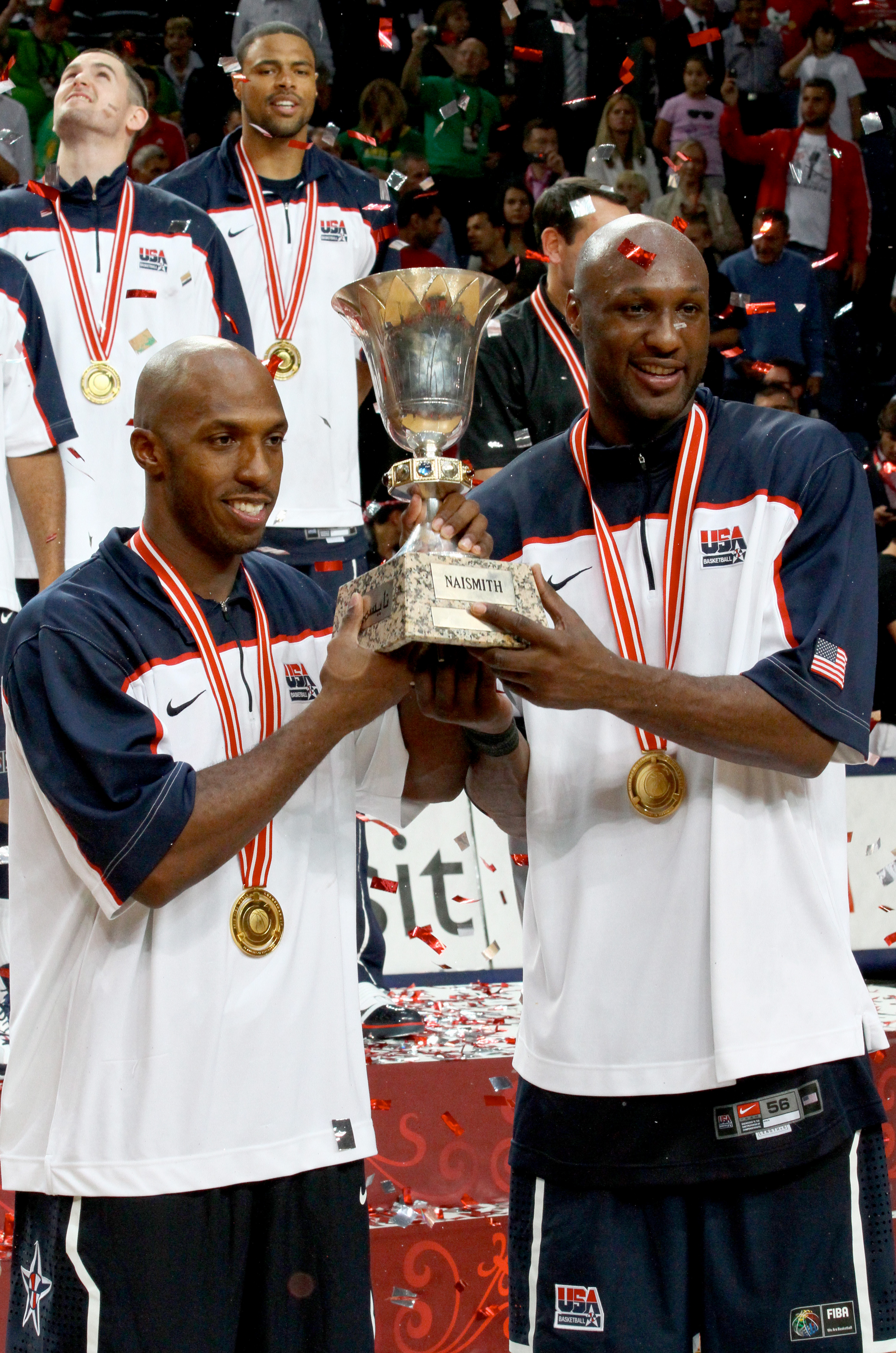
Chauncey Billups (left) and Odom holding the 2010 FIBA World Championship trophy

Odom played for the U.S. national team on the 2004 Olympic team in Athens, averaging 9.3 ppg while helping the U.S. to a bronze medal. He was invited to play for the FIBA World Championships for 2006 but declined the invitation because of the death of his son and in 2007 because of a shoulder injury.

Odom joined the 2010 FIBA World Championship team in Istanbul, Turkey, where the U.S. won gold for the first time since 1994. Odom, being one of the elder statesmen on a young U.S. squad, served as a mentor for many of the younger players and even played out of position at center for the tournament. He led the U.S. in rebounds and finished the FIBA championships with double-doubles in the semi-final and championship games while becoming the first player in history to win both an NBA championship and FIBA gold in the same year.

== Player profile ==
Odom was renowned for the impact his positive personality had on his teams. Lakers general manager Mitch Kupchak called him "the most popular player in our locker room". Odom valued the concept of a team and played unselfishly, and was content deferring to teammates while playing a supporting role. Standing at 6 feet 10 inches (2.08 m), he was still adept at dribbling the ball and directing the offense, and could also rebound proficiently as a small forward. He was able to score as a post player, on mid-range jumpers, as well as from outside. He could start a fast break with an outlet pass, finish it with a layup, or simply drive from coast to coast for a dunk. Though he was a reserve on the Lakers championship teams, he typically finished games in place of starter Andrew Bynum.

Odom was cooperative with the media, and provided both thoughtful and open responses.

== Career statistics ==
Legend
GP	Games played	GS	Games started	MPG	Minutes per game
FG%	Field goal percentage	3P%	3-point field goal percentage	FT%	Free throw percentage
RPG	Rebounds per game	APG	Assists per game	SPG	Steals per game
BPG	Blocks per game	PPG	Points per game	**Bold**	Career high
†	Won an NBA championship	*	Led the league

=== NBA ===
==== Regular season ====
Year	Team	GP	GS	MPG	FG%	3P%	FT%	RPG	APG	SPG	BPG	PPG
1999–00	L.A. Clippers	76	70	36.4	.438	.360	.719	7.8	4.2	**1.2**	1.3	16.6
2000–01	L.A. Clippers	76	74	37.3	.460	.316	.679	7.8	5.2	1.0	**1.6**	**17.2**
2001–02	L.A. Clippers	29	25	34.4	.419	.190	.656	6.1	**5.9**	.8	1.2	13.1
2002–03	L.A. Clippers	49	47	34.3	.439	.326	**.777**	6.7	3.6	.9	.8	14.6
2003–04	Miami	80	**80**	37.5	.430	.298	.742	9.7	4.1	1.1	.9	17.1
2004–05	L.A. Lakers	64	64	36.3	.473	.308	.695	10.2	3.7	.7	1.0	15.2
2005–06	L.A. Lakers	80	**80**	**40.3**	.481	.372	.690	9.2	5.5	.9	.8	14.8
2006–07	L.A. Lakers	56	56	39.3	.468	.297	.700	9.8	4.8	.9	.6	15.9
2007–08	L.A. Lakers	77	77	37.9	.525	.274	.698	**10.6**	3.5	1.0	.9	14.2
2008–09†	L.A. Lakers	78	32	29.7	.492	.320	.623	8.2	2.6	1.0	1.3	11.3
2009–10†	L.A. Lakers	**82***	38	31.5	.463	.319	.693	9.8	3.3	.9	.7	10.8
2010–11	L.A. Lakers	**82**	35	32.2	**.530**	**.382**	.675	8.7	3.0	.6	.7	14.4
2011–12	Dallas	50	4	20.5	.352	.252	.592	4.2	1.7	.4	.4	6.6
2012–13	L.A. Clippers	**82***	2	19.7	.399	.200	.476	5.9	1.7	.8	.7	4.0
Career		961	684	33.4	.463	.312	.693	8.4	3.7	.9	.9	13.3

==== Playoffs ====
Year	Team	GP	GS	MPG	FG%	3P%	FT%	RPG	APG	SPG	BPG	PPG
2004	Miami	13	13	39.4	.445	.308	.681	8.3	2.8	**1.2**	.8	16.8
2006	L.A. Lakers	7	7	**44.9**	.495	.200	.667	11.0	**4.9**	.4	1.1	19.1
2007	L.A. Lakers	5	5	38.4	.482	.273	.500	**13.0**	2.2	.4	1.2	**19.4**
2008	L.A. Lakers	21	**21**	37.4	.491	.273	.661	10.0	3.0	.7	**1.3**	14.3
2009†	L.A. Lakers	**23**	5	32.0	**.524**	**.514**	.613	9.1	1.8	.7	**1.3**	12.3
2010†	L.A. Lakers	**23**	0	29.0	.469	.244	.600	8.6	2.0	.7	.9	9.7
2011	L.A. Lakers	10	1	28.6	.459	.200	**.711**	6.5	2.1	.2	.4	12.1
2013	L.A. Clippers	6	1	17.8	.367	.357	.500	3.8	1.8	.8	.8	5.0
Career		108	53	33.3	.479	.303	.643	8.8	2.4	.7	1.0	13.0

=== International leagues ===
==== Regular season ====
Year	Team	GP	GS	MPG	FG%	3P%	FT%	RPG	APG	SPG	BPG	PPG
2013–14	Baskonia	2	0	11.5	.125	.000	.000	2.0	.5	1.0	1.0	1.0
Career		2	0	11.5	.125	.000	.000	2.0	.5	1.0	1.0	1.0

=== College ===
Year	Team	GP	GS	MPG	FG%	3P%	FT%	RPG	APG	SPG	BPG	PPG
1997–98	Rhode Island	Ineligible due to college admittance as non-matriculating student										
1998–99	Rhode Island	32	32	34.9	.482	.330	.687	9.4	3.8	.8	1.5	17.6

== Personal life ==
Odom had three children, Destiny (b. 1998), Lamar Jr. (b. 2002) and Jayden (2005–2006) with former girlfriend Liza Morales. On June 29, 2006, 6½-month-old Jayden died from sudden infant death syndrome while sleeping in his crib in New York. At the time, Odom was already in town for the funeral of an aunt. Odom developed a relationship with his father, who became drug-free; however, he remains closer to his high school coach, Jerry DeGregorio, who he calls [his] "white dad". DeGregorio is the godfather to Destiny and Lamar Jr.

In September 2009, Odom married Khloé Kardashian after a month of dating. He had met her at a party for Lakers teammate Ron Artest. Their wedding was featured on the E! reality-based series Keeping Up with the Kardashians, in which she stars. Odom became a fixture on the show and a household name to millions who were not already familiar with him as a basketball player. In December 2010, E! announced another spinoff from the series featuring Odom, Kardashian, and his two children from his previous relationship. The series, titled Khloé & Lamar, debuted on April 10, 2011. Soon thereafter, Odom almost opted out of the show as the filming wore him down. The series was canceled in 2012 after two seasons.

On August 30, 2013, Odom was arrested on charges of driving under the influence (DUI). After the arrest, he refused to submit to a chemical test. Almost a week earlier, gossip websites had alleged that Odom had been abusing drugs, which prompted worried tweets from former teammates and coaches. On December 9, Odom pleaded no contest to the DUI charges and accepted a sentence of three years' probation and three months of alcohol abuse treatment. On December 13, after months of speculated separation, Kardashian filed for divorce from Odom and for legal restoration of her last name. Divorce papers were signed by both parties in July 2015; however, the divorce did not receive final approval from a judge before being dismissed by request in October 2015.

On October 13, 2015, Odom was hospitalized after being discovered unconscious at the Love Ranch, a legal brothel in Crystal, Nevada. He visited the ranch seeking the company of two prostitutes. Odom, who had used cocaine in the days prior to his medical emergency, suffered kidney failure, several heart attacks, and 12 strokes. He became comatose and was placed on life support in a hospital in Las Vegas before regaining consciousness. He was transferred from Las Vegas to a Los Angeles hospital by medical transport. In the aftermath of the incident, Kardashian withdrew her request for a divorce; she stated that she had not reconciled with Odom, but wished to assist him in making medical decisions during his recovery.

Odom's recovery went well. On January 8, 2016, Odom's paternal aunt JaNean Mercer told Us Weekly that "the former NBA star is on the road to recovery after finally leaving the hospital earlier in the week." She said, "Lamar continues to make remarkable strides." In early 2016, Khloé Kardashian said, "I'm just there to support and care for him. But he is doing amazing." On May 26, 2016, Kardashian filed for divorce again, and their divorce was finalized in December 2016. In 2017, Odom spoke publicly about his health struggles, his cocaine addiction, and his recovery from that addiction. He called himself a "walking miracle" who had "cheated death", and acknowledged that his past drug use had made "the end of [his basketball] career come along a little faster".

Odom has his own music and film production company, Rich Soil Entertainment. He appeared in a Taco Bell commercial with Charles Barkley during Super Bowl XLIV. Additionally, Odom made a cameo on the second season of the HBO television series Entourage.

Odom is noted for his fondness for candy. Wrigley made a replica of the Larry O'Brien Championship Trophy out of candy in celebration of the Lakers' victory in the 2009 Finals, and Odom's name is featured on the base.

In November 2019, Odom announced his engagement to Sabrina Parr, a health and lifestyle coach. On November 5, 2020, Parr confirmed that their engagement had been called off.

In February 2022, Odom was a HouseGuest on the third season of Celebrity Big Brother.

In 2023, Lamar Odom sold his company, Odom Senior Care to ZNest.com, a senior living platform. He subsequently became Chief Creative Officer at ZNest, where he leverages his personal experiences to help families navigate senior care options and improve access to quality housing for elders.

On May 22, 2025, Odom—seeking to promote his own $ODOM memecoin—was one of 220 holders of President Trump's cryptocurrency memecoin who paid to attend a private dinner at Trump's Virginia golf club.

On January 17, 2026, Odom was arrested in Las Vegas and booked on a DUI charge which also consisted of two traffic violations. As of January 20, 2026, he was no longer in custody.

=== Boxing ===
On June 11, 2021, Odom participated in an exhibition boxing match with singer/rapper Aaron Carter. He defeated Carter by TKO in the second round. On October 2, 2021, Odom defeated actor Ojani Noa in a celebrity boxing match.

== Filmography ==
Year	Title	Role	Notes
1996	Arli$$	Himself	
2000	ESPN Outside the Lines Sunday	Himself	
2002	Van Wilder	Coolidge Chickadee Player	Uncredited
2005	Entourage	Himself	Uncredited
2006	Hood of Horror	Himself	
2009	Fantasy Factory	Himself	Uncredited
2009	Kobe Doin' Work	Himself	TV special
2009–present	Keeping Up with the Kardashians	Himself	Supporting cast
2010	Modern Family	Himself (with Los Angeles Lakers)	Episode: "Family Portrait"
2010	Minute to Win It	Himself	
2010–2013	Kourtney and Khloé Take Miami	Himself	Supporting cast (3 episodes)
2011–2012	Khloé & Lamar	Himself	Main cast (8 episodes)
2011	Jack and Jill	Himself	Cameo with Los Angeles Lakers
2019	Dancing with the Stars	Himself	Contestant (season 28)
2022	Celebrity Big Brother 3	Himself	Contestant
2022	College Hill: Celebrity Edition	Himself	Main cast
2022	13th and Pine	College Coach	
2024	Jersey Shore: Family Vacation	Himself	Episode: "The Bunker"
2026	The Death and Life of Lamar Odom	Himself	Documentary film in Untold series
