= Sir Separanlu =

Sir Separanlu (Persian: سير سپرانلو) may refer to:

- Sir Separanlu-ye Olya
- Sir Separanlu-ye Sofla
