= Nazar Mohammed =

Nazar Mohammad or similar may refer to:

- Nazar Mohammad, Pakistani cricketer
- Nazr Mohammed, American basketball player
- Nazar Mohammad, Iran
- Nazar Mohammad (Afghan communist)
- Mohammad Nazar Faqiri, Afghan politician
