= Smush Parker =

American basketball player (born 1981)

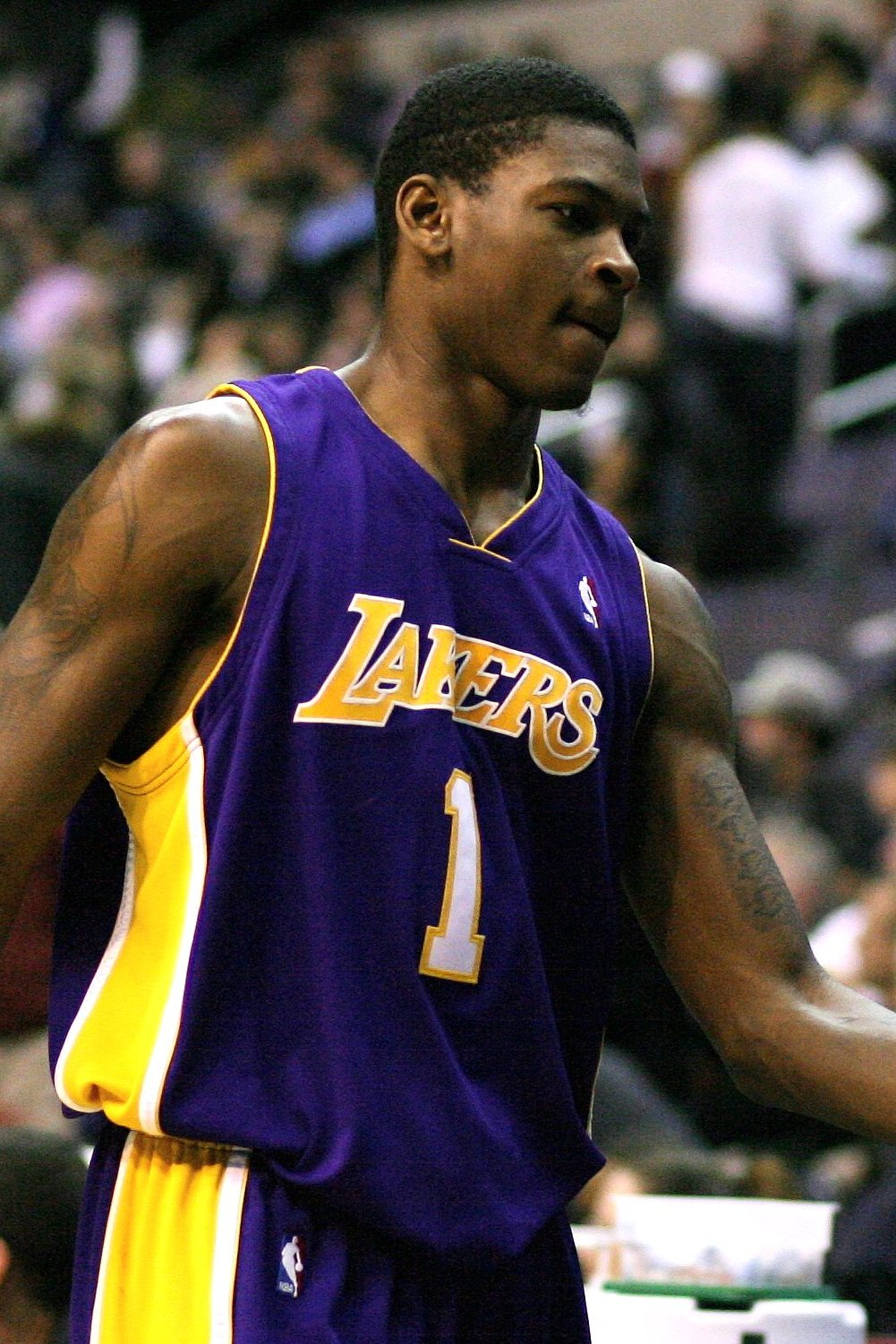
- Parker with the Los Angeles Lakers in 2007

Personal information
- Born: June 1, 1981 (age 45) Brooklyn, New York, U.S.
- Listed height: 6 ft 4 in (1.93 m)
- Listed weight: 190 lb (86 kg)

Career information
- High school: Newtown (Queens, New York)
- College: College of Southern Idaho (1999–2000); Fordham (2001–2002)
- NBA draft: 2002: undrafted
- Playing career: 2002–2018
- Position: Point guard / shooting guard
- Number: 17, 7, 1, 21

Career history
- 2002–2003: Cleveland Cavaliers
- 2003–2004: Aris
- 2004: Idaho Stampede
- 2004–2005: Detroit Pistons
- 2005: Florida Flame
- 2005: Phoenix Suns
- 2005: Florida Flame
- 2005–2007: Los Angeles Lakers
- 2007–2008: Miami Heat
- 2008: Los Angeles Clippers
- 2008: Rio Grande Valley Vipers
- 2009–2010: Guangdong Southern Tigers
- 2010–2011: Spartak Saint Petersburg
- 2011: Iraklis
- 2012: Petrochimi Bandar Imam
- 2012: Guaros de Lara
- 2012: Indios SFM
- 2012–2013: Cibona
- 2013: Peristeri
- 2014: Guaros de Lara
- 2015: Mon-Altius Madimos Falcons (Mongolia)
- 2015: Étoile Sportive de Radès
- 2016: Maghreb de Fes
- 2017–2018: Albany Patroons

Career highlights
- Greek Cup winner (2004); Greek Cup Finals Top Scorer (2004)
- Stats at NBA.com
- Stats at Basketball Reference

William Henry "Smush" Parker III (born June 1, 1981) is an American former professional basketball player. He played in the National Basketball Association (NBA), the NBA G-League and several leagues overseas. Parker played shooting guard in college but moved to point guard in the NBA.

== Early years ==
Parker was born in Brooklyn to parents William "Bill" Henry Parker II and Robin Royal Parker. He attended Newtown High School in Elmhurst, Queens, where he was a star guard on their varsity basketball team. He then enrolled in the College of Southern Idaho as a freshman in the 1999–2000 season and was originally going to be recruited by University of North Carolina due to being connected with Kenny Smith, who founded Parker's AAU basketball team. His recruitment proved unsuccessful due to his high school grades. Parker then transferred to play college basketball at Fordham University. Following his sophomore season at Fordham University, he entered the NBA in 2002 but went undrafted. During his sophomore season, he was Second Team All A-10 and Second Team NABC All-Region.

== Professional career ==
=== Early career ===
While Parker was not drafted out of college, he played with the Orlando Magic in the NBA Summer League in Orlando, against the Boston Celtics in Boston, before travelling west to play against the Utah Jazz in Utah while Parker was a member for the Toronto Raptors. He was then invited by the Cleveland Cavaliers to attend their vet camp and the team finally signed him for the 2002–03 season.

In 2003, Parker signed with Aris Thessaloniki of the Greek League (FIBA Europe) and helped the team win the 2004 Greek Basketball Cup in the final against Olympiacos. He returned to the NBA in 2004 and played for the Detroit Pistons and the Phoenix Suns.

=== Los Angeles Lakers (2005–2007) ===
He then signed a contract with the Los Angeles Lakers during the summer of 2005.

Not well-known entering the 2005 season, Parker gained recognition as the starting point guard for the Lakers under coach Phil Jackson. While many experts thought that either newly signed veteran Aaron McKie or Sasha Vujačić would start at point guard, Parker became the surprise starter in the Lakers' season opener against the Denver Nuggets and went on to score at least 20 points in four of his first five games. This impressed Jackson, and Parker found himself in the starting line-up for the Lakers. From 2005 until 2007, Parker started 162 straight games, averaging 11.5 points. During the last two games of the regular season and the playoffs (2006–2007), Parker lost his starting spot to rookie Jordan Farmar.

While with the Lakers, Parker clashed with Kobe Bryant. Bryant singled out Parker as a bad teammate, saying in 2012 that Parker "shouldn't have been in the NBA, but [the Lakers] were too cheap to pay for a point guard." Parker would later detail in an interview in 2024 on how Bryant was a bad teammate, with Kobe telling Parker he was not worth talking to until he had more accolades. Parker says that he felt small and disrespected while trying to make small talk outside of basketball and called playing for Kobe Bryant 'an overrated experience'. The two men never spoke again before Bryant's death in 2020.

=== Later NBA and overseas career ===
On July 26, 2007, Parker signed with the Miami Heat. For the Heat, Parker wore jersey number 21. His production dropped off dramatically while with the Heat, with averages of 4.8 points, 1.7 assists and 2.1 rebounds, compared to his 11.1 in 164 games with the Los Angeles Lakers. After a physical altercation that Parker had with a parking attendant in November 2007, the Miami Heat put him on paid leave to investigate the matter. On March 10, 2008, the Miami Heat officially waived Parker. The Los Angeles Clippers then signed him for the rest of the season on March 12, 2008.

On July 10, 2008, the Los Angeles Clippers officially renounced their rights to Parker. In the 2008 offseason, Parker was signed by the Denver Nuggets but was released on October 23, 2008, as the Nuggets trimmed their roster to the league-allowed 15. He then played with the Rio Grande Valley Vipers of the NBA Development League.

Parker never played in the NBA after the 2007 - 2008 season with the Clippers and thus his final NBA game ever was played on April 16, 2008, in a 75 - 93 loss to the Houston Rockets. In his final game, Parker recorded 9 points, 2 rebounds and 2 assists.

On January 9, 2009, Parker officially signed with Guangdong Southern Tigers of the Chinese Basketball Association.

In September 2010, he signed a one-year contract with the Russian club Spartak Saint Petersburg.

In January 2011, he returned to Greece and signed a contract with Iraklis Thessaloniki.

In January 2012, Parker signed with Petrochimi Bandar Imam of the Iranian Basketball Super League. He later played in Venezuela, then signed with the Indios de San Francisco de Macorís of the Dominican Republic. In December 2012, Parker signed with Cibona Zagreb of the Adriatic Basketball Association. After only 5 games in Adriatic League, Parker was released.

In March 2013, he returned to Greece and signed a contract with Peristeri of the Greek League.

In January 2014, he signed with his former team Guaros de Lara. He left the team that March. In June, Parker played in The Basketball Tournament. His team reached the semi-finals, and Parker's averages for the tournament were 16.2 points, 7.8 rebounds, 7.0 assists and 1.8 steals per game.

In February 2015, Parker signed with Mon-Altius Madimos Falcons of the Mongolian National Basketball Association (MNBA). He averaged 24 points, 7.0 rebounds, 6.5 assists and 4.1 steals per game.

On November 30, 2017, Parker signed with the Albany Patroons of the North American Premier Basketball.

== NBA career statistics ==
Legend
GP	Games played	GS	Games started	MPG	Minutes per game
FG%	Field goal percentage	3P%	3-point field goal percentage	FT%	Free throw percentage
RPG	Rebounds per game	APG	Assists per game	SPG	Steals per game
BPG	Blocks per game	PPG	Points per game	**Bold**	Career high
*	Led the league

=== Regular season ===
Year	Team	GP	GS	MPG	FG%	3P%	FT%	RPG	APG	SPG	BPG	PPG
2002–03	Cleveland	66	18	16.7	.402	.322	**.831**	1.8	2.5	.7	.2	6.2
2004–05	Detroit	11	1	10.0	.393	.222	.692	.8	1.0	.3	.0	3.0
2004–05	Phoenix	5	0	6.8	**.467**	.250	.000	.6	.8	.4	.0	3.0
2005–06	L.A. Lakers	**82***	**82***	**33.8**	.447	**.366**	.694	**3.3**	**3.7**	**1.7**	.2	**11.5**
2006–07	L.A. Lakers	**82***	80	30.0	.436	.365	.646	2.5	2.8	1.5	.1	11.1
2007–08	Miami	9	0	20.3	.315	.250	.750	2.1	1.7	.6	**.3**	4.8
2007–08	L.A. Clippers	19	2	21.5	.362	.222	.667	1.7	3.6	1.0	.2	6.4
Career		274	183	25.8	.426	.345	.708	2.4	2.9	1.2	.2	9.0

=== Playoffs ===
Year	Team	GP	GS	MPG	FG%	3P%	FT%	RPG	APG	SPG	BPG	PPG
2006	L.A. Lakers	**7**	**7**	**36.9**	**.333**	.154	**1.000**	**3.0**	**1.6**	**2.1**	.1	**8.9**
2007	L.A. Lakers	5	0	11.8	.154	**.167**	**1.000**	1.4	.6	.6	**.2**	1.8
Career		12	7	26.4	.306	.156	1.000	2.3	1.2	1.5	.2	5.9

== Personal life ==
Parker earned his nickname "Smush" at birth from his mother. "Smush" was a term of endearment for his father, so he became Baby Smush at birth. Parker has one daughter from a previous relationship. Parker is currently married to Noelani Parker.
