= Pat Burke =

Irish basketball player

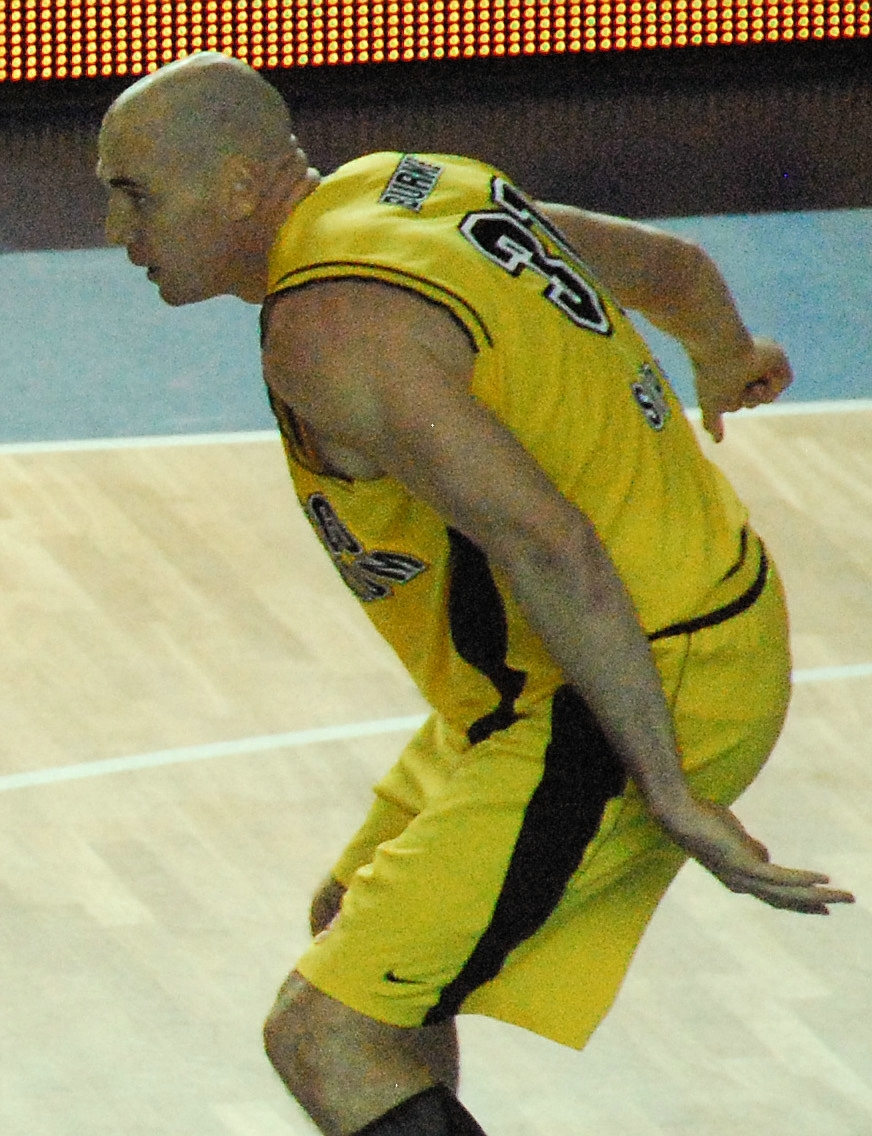
- Burke with Asseco Prokom Sopot in 2009

Personal information
- Born: December 14, 1973 (age 52) Dublin, Ireland
- Listed height: 6 ft 11 in (2.11 m)
- Listed weight: 250 lb (113 kg)

Career information
- High school: Mariner (Cape Coral, Florida)
- College: Auburn (1993–1997)
- NBA draft: 1997: undrafted
- Playing career: 1997–2009
- Position: Center

Career history

Playing
- 1997–1998: TAU Cerámica
- 1998–2001: Panathinaikos
- 2001–2002: Maroussi
- 2002–2003: Orlando Magic
- 2003–2004: Gran Canaria
- 2004–2005: Real Madrid
- 2005–2007: Phoenix Suns
- 2007–2008: Khimki BC
- 2008–2009: Asseco Prokom Sopot

Coaching
- 2025–Present: Beacon College

Career highlights
- EuroLeague champion (2000); 3x GBL champion (1999–2001); Liga ACB champion (2005); Russian Cup winner (2008); PLK champion (2009)
- Stats at NBA.com
- Stats at Basketball Reference

Patrick John Burke (born December 14, 1973) is an Irish former professional basketball player who is currently the men's basketball head coach for Beacon College. He played in the National Basketball Association (NBA) for three seasons between 2002 and 2007, for the Orlando Magic and the Phoenix Suns. To date, he is the only Irishman to have played in the NBA. He also played in Europe, mainly in Greece and Spain, before ending his career with Asseco Prokom Sopot. He was a co-captain of the senior Ireland national team and also represented his country at the World University Games.

== Early life ==
Burke was born in Dublin, Ireland. Burke and his family moved from Tullamore in Ireland, to Cleveland, Ohio in the United States when he was three years old.

Burke played high school basketball at Mariner High School in Cape Coral, Florida. He played college basketball at Auburn University with the Auburn Tigers from 1993 to 1997.

== Professional career ==
=== NBA ===
After not being drafted out of Auburn University in 1997, Burke became the first Irish-born player in NBA history when he signed a contract with the Orlando Magic in 2002. He played in 62 games with them, averaging 4.3 points and 2.4 rebounds per game. He did not play in the NBA during the 2003–04 NBA season, or the 2004–05 NBA season. In his return to the NBA, he played for the Phoenix Suns for two seasons. He was also in training camp with the Golden State Warriors in 2007 before being released.

=== Europe ===
Burke was a EuroLeague champion with Panathinaikos in the 1999–00 season and he also helped the "Greens" to win three consecutive Greek League titles from 1999 to 2001. In Europe, he also played with the Spanish clubs Tau Ceramica, Gran Canaria and Real Madrid, and with Maroussi in Greece. He helped Real to the final of the ULEB Cup (now called EuroCup) in 2004 and to the Spanish League title in 2005.

In November 2007, Burke signed with Russian club Khimki and helped the team win their first Russian Cup title. Burke averaged 8.2 points and 5.2 rebounds per game in 211 career games played over all of the different European leagues that he competed in. In 2008, he moved to the Polish club Asseco Prokom Sopot and he helped the team to win the league's title.

== Coaching ==
Pat Burke was named the new men's basketball head coach at Beacon College in Leesburg, Florida in March 2025. Burke succeeds Sam Vincent, who coached the Beacon NaviGators/Blazers from 2022 to 2025 and helped the athletic program achieve USCAA membership. Burke has had ties with Beacon College since 2015 when he pitched the idea to begin a summer program at the school for Saudi and other international students. He is also the director of athletics.

== NBA Career statistics ==
Legend
GP	Games played	GS	Games started	MPG	Minutes per game
FG%	Field goal percentage	3P%	3-point field goal percentage	FT%	Free throw percentage
RPG	Rebounds per game	APG	Assists per game	SPG	Steals per game
BPG	Blocks per game	PPG	Points per game	**Bold**	Career high

=== Regular season ===
Year	Team	GP	GS	MPG	FG%	3P%	FT%	RPG	APG	SPG	BPG	PPG
2002–03	Orlando	**62**	**8**	**12.6**	.382	.143	**.690**	**2.4**	**.4**	**.3**	**.4**	**4.3**
2005–06	Phoenix	42	0	8.2	**.496**	**.286**	.619	1.7	**.4**	.1	.3	3.4
2006–07	Phoenix	23	0	7.1	.354	.273	.615	2.0	.2	.1	.1	2.6
Career		127	8	10.2	.408	.250	.663	2.1	.3	.2	.3	3.7

=== Playoffs ===
Year	Team	GP	GS	MPG	FG%	3P%	FT%	RPG	APG	SPG	BPG	PPG
2003	Orlando	**6**	0	**7.2**	**.600**	-	**.833**	1.8	**.2**	**.2**	-	**2.8**
2006	Phoenix	3	0	2.3	.500	**.500**	.000	.7	-	-	**.3**	1.7
2007	Phoenix	3	0	2.3	.500	-	-	.3	-	-	.3	.7
Career		12	0	4.8	.563	.500	.714	1.3	.1	.1	.2	2.0

== EuroLeague ==
=== Regular season ===
Year	Team	GP	GS	MPG	FG%	3P%	FT%	RPG	APG	SPG	BPG	PPG
1997–98	TAU Cerámica	34	-	24.9	.616	-	.700	6.4	.4	1.2	1.2	9.6
2001–02	Maroussi Telestet	26	-	31.0	.577	.000	.704	9.8	1.2	1.0	.7	14.4
2003–04	Auna Gran Canaria	20	-	20.4	.509	.395	.727	5.4	.3	.7	.6	10.8
2003–04	Real Madrid	13	-	22.9	.531	.500	.571	5.2	.5	.7	.2	7.7
2004–05	Real Madrid	31	-	19.0	.515	.600	.674	4.4	.5	.5	.7	7.6
Career		-	-	-	-	-	-	-	-	-	-	-

=== Playoffs ===
Year	Team	GP	GS	MPG	FG%	3P%	FT%	RPG	APG	SPG	BPG	PPG
1997–98	TAU Cerámica	8	-	22.9	.517	-	.667	6.6	.4	1.1	-	9.5
1998–99	Panathinaikos	15	-	12.3	.587	.000	.538	1.3	.4	.4	-	4.1
1999–2000	Panathinaikos	21	-	17.3	.632	-	.605	4.3	.5	.5	.1	6.3
2000–01	Panathinaikos	16	-	12.0	.635	-	.696	3.2	.9	.6	.3	6.0
2001–02	Maroussi Telestet	14	-	29.0	.537	-	.722	9.2	1.1	.9	1.1	14.2
2003–04	Real Madrid	7	-	25.0	.551	.111	.667	6.7	.4	.9	.6	9.0
2004–05	Real Madrid	19	-	17.1	.510	.000	.680	4.4	.4	.5	.3	6.5
2007–08	Khimki	11	-	12.1	.350	.000	.875	2.5	.3	.3	.3	3.8
2008-09	Asseco Prokom Sopot	15	-	23.9	.508	.273	.694	6.9	.6	.5	.5	10.7
Career		-	-	-	-	-	-	-	-	-	-	-

== College ==
Year	Team	GP	GS	MPG	FG%	3P%	FT%	RPG	APG	SPG	BPG	PPG
1993–94	Auburn	28	0	13.9	.480	-	.500	2.9	.5	.1	.9	4.0
1994–95	Auburn	29	15	22.1	.532	.333	.642	4.8	1.0	.9	1.0	9.0
1995-96	Auburn	32	31	28.1	.481	.241	.649	8.7	.9	.5	1.4	11.0
1996-97	Auburn	31	25	25.6	.474	.154	.645	7.0	.7	.9	1.1	11.0
Career		120	71	22.7	.491	.222	.631	6.0	.8	.6	1.1	8.9

== Coaching ==
Record table
Season	Team	Overall	Conference	Standing	Postseason
Beacon College Blazers (men) (New South Athletic Conference) (2025–Present)
2025–26	Beacon College	14-12	New South Athletic Conference	4th	
Total:		14–12 (.538)			
National champion Postseason invitational champion Conference regular season champion Conference regular season and conference tournament champion Division regular season champion Division regular season and conference tournament champion Conference tournament champion
