= Sir Separanlu-ye Sofla =

Village in North Khorasan, Iran

Sir Separanlu-ye Sofla سيس پيرانلوسفلي
- Village
- Location within Iran
- Coordinates: 37°41′26″N 58°01′15″E
- Country: Iran
- Province: North Khorasan
- County: Shirvan
- Bakhsh: Sarhad
- Rural District: Jirestan

Population (2006)
  - Total: 95
- Time zone: UTC+3:30 (IRST)
  - Summer (DST): UTC+4:30 (IRDT)

Sir Separanlu-ye Sofla (Persian: سيس پيرانلوسفلي, also Romanized as Sīr Separānlū-ye Soflá; also known as Sīr Separānlū-ye Pā’īn, Sīr Sīrānlū-ye Pā’īn, Sīs Pārānlū-ye Pā’īn, and Sīspārānlū-ye Soflá) is a village in Jirestan Rural District, Sarhad District, Shirvan County, North Khorasan Province, Iran. At the 2006 census, its population was 95, in 27 families.
