= Kuseh, North Khorasan =

Village in North Khorasan province, Iran

Kuseh Persian: كوسه
- Village
- Location within Iran
- Coordinates: 37°42′49″N 57°57′13″E
- Country: Iran
- Province: North Khorasan
- County: Shirvan
- District: Sarhad
- Rural District: Jirestan

Population (2016)
  - Total: 600
- Time zone: UTC+3:30 (IRST)

Kuseh (Persian: كوسه) (Note: Also romanized as Kūseh; also known as Kūseh Takht) is a village in, and the capital of, Jirestan Rural District in Sarhad District of Shirvan County, North Khorasan province, Iran.

== Demographics ==
=== Language ===
The local language is Turkmen.

=== Population ===
At the time of the 2006 National Census, the village's population was 645 in 159 households. The following census in 2011 counted 525 people in 162 households. The 2016 census measured the population of the village as 600 people in 184 households.
