= Nazr Mohammed =

American basketball player (born 1977)

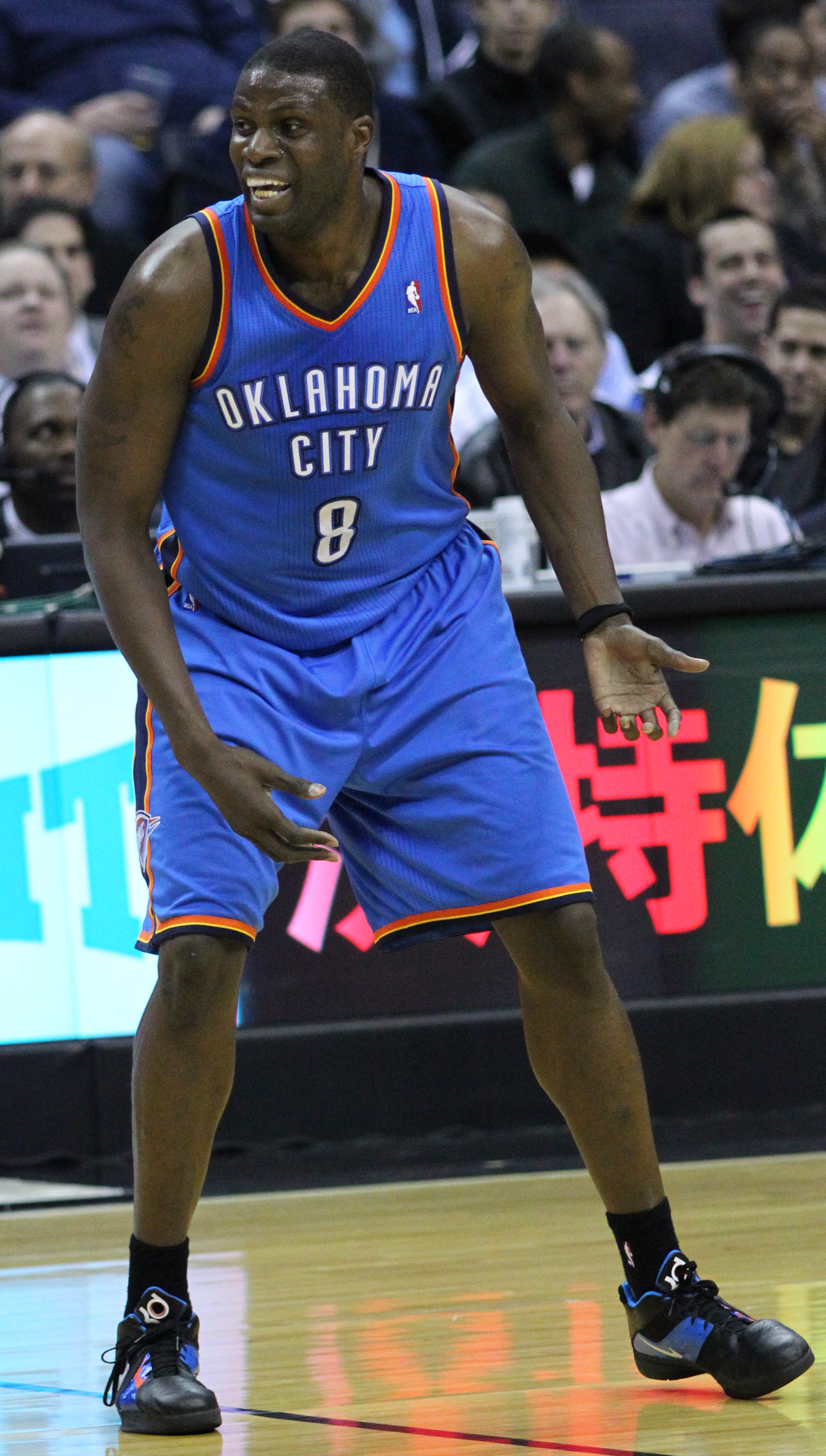
- Mohammed with the Oklahoma City Thunder in 2011

Oklahoma City Blue
- Title: General manager
- League: NBA G League

Personal information
- Born: September 5, 1977 (age 49) Chicago, Illinois, U.S.
- Listed height: 6 ft 10 in (2.08 m)
- Listed weight: 250 lb (113 kg)

Career information
- High school: Kenwood Academy (Chicago, Illinois)
- College: Kentucky (1995–1998)
- NBA draft: 1998: 1st round, 29th overall pick
- Drafted by: Utah Jazz
- Playing career: 1998–2016
- Position: Center
- Number: 14, 2, 13, 6, 8, 48

Career history
- 1998–2001: Philadelphia 76ers
- 2001–2004: Atlanta Hawks
- 2004–2005: New York Knicks
- 2005–2006: San Antonio Spurs
- 2006–2007: Detroit Pistons
- 2007–2011: Charlotte Bobcats
- 2011–2012: Oklahoma City Thunder
- 2012–2015: Chicago Bulls
- 2016: Oklahoma City Thunder

Career highlights
- NBA champion (2005); 2× NCAA champion (1996, 1998); First-team All-SEC (1998)

Career NBA statistics
- Points: 5,827 (5.8 ppg)
- Rebounds: 4,708 (4.7 rpg)
- Blocks: 639 (0.6 bpg)
- Stats at NBA.com
- Stats at Basketball Reference

Nazr Tahiru Mohammed (/ˈnɑːzi/ NAH-zee; born September 5, 1977) is an American former professional basketball player who had a journeyman career in the National Basketball Association (NBA), playing for eight different teams over 18 seasons. He is the current general manager of the Oklahoma City Blue and a pro scout for the Oklahoma City Thunder. He played college basketball for Kentucky.

== Early life ==
The son of Alhaji Muhammad, an entrepreneur from Ghana, Mohammed was raised in Chicago and attended high school at Kenwood Academy, graduating in 1995. Mohammed entered the University of Kentucky in the fall of 1995 at a hefty 315 pounds, and saw little playing time during their NCAA Championship season. After slimming down for his sophomore year, Mohammed shared the starting center spot with Jamaal Magloire and was a key contributor in 1997, when the Wildcats were runners-up to Arizona. Mohammed once again shared the starting post position with Magloire in 1998, and once again they brought the NCAA Championship home to Kentucky, for the second time in three years.

== Professional career ==
=== Philadelphia 76ers (1998–2001) ===
After his junior year, Mohammed decided to enter the 1998 NBA draft. He was selected by the Utah Jazz in the first round, as the 29th pick overall. Utah traded his rights to the Philadelphia 76ers for a future first-round pick, which turned out to be Quincy Lewis in the 1999 NBA draft. He spent two and a half seasons in Philadelphia before being traded in February 2001 to the Atlanta Hawks along with an injured Theo Ratliff in exchange for Hall of Fame center Dikembe Mutombo.

=== Atlanta Hawks (2001–2004) ===
On November 5, 2001, he scored a career-high 30 points against the Los Angeles Clippers. He played for the Hawks through the middle of the 2003–04 season, at which point he was traded to the New York Knicks for Michael Doleac.

=== New York Knicks (2004–2005) ===
Mohammed spent half of the 2004–05 season with the Knicks.

=== San Antonio Spurs (2005–2006) ===
He played for the San Antonio Spurs (who acquired him in a trade for Malik Rose), for the second half of the 2004-05 NBA season. In a combined 77 games for both teams, he averaged 9.5 points, 7.6 rebounds and 1.1 blocks per game. He won his first and only championship in 2005 with the Spurs as a member of their starting lineup.

During his second season in San Antonio, Mohammed shared the starting center position with Rasho Nesterović, averaging 6.2 points and 5.2 rebounds per game during the regular season. On March 17, 2006, he tied his career-high of 30 points against the Phoenix Suns. He was a key contributor to the team's first round series victory over the Sacramento Kings, averaging 7.0 points per game and nailing his second career three-point basket late in Game 1. Mohammed, however, played sparingly in the team's second round series loss to the Dallas Mavericks. After the season, he turned down a four-year contract extension and did not return to the Spurs.

=== Detroit Pistons (2006–2007) ===
In July 2006, he signed with the Detroit Pistons and became their starting center. After beginning the season in the starting five, the arrival of Chris Webber on January 16, 2007 made him gradually fall out of the team's rotation, the culmination being his 5 minutes in two postseason contests. He averaged 5.6 points and 4.5 rebounds in 51 games (33 starts), with about 15 minutes of action per game.

=== Charlotte Bobcats (2007–2011) ===
Mohammed was traded from the Pistons to the Charlotte Bobcats on December 14, 2007, in exchange for Primož Brezec and Walter Herrmann.

=== Oklahoma City Thunder (2011–2012) ===
On February 24, 2011, Mohammed was traded to the Oklahoma City Thunder, while forward D. J. White and guard Morris Peterson were sent to the Charlotte Bobcats. He reached the 2012 NBA Finals with the Thunder, but the team lost to the Miami Heat 4 games to 1.

=== Chicago Bulls (2012–2015) ===
On July 27, 2012, Mohammed signed with his hometown team, the Chicago Bulls. On May 10, 2013, he was involved in an altercation with LeBron James in the 2013 NBA Playoffs, in Game 3 of the Eastern Conference semi-finals. James was called for a technical foul for tying up with Mohammed in transition; Mohammed retaliated by shoving James which got him ejected.

On July 11, 2013, Mohammed re-signed with the Bulls. On September 22, 2014, he again re-signed with the Bulls.

On August 1, 2015, Mohammed played for Team Africa at the 2015 NBA Africa exhibition game. On October 9, 2015, he retired from the NBA.

=== Return to Oklahoma City (2016) ===
In March 2016, Mohammed came out of retirement in order to return to the NBA. On March 5, he signed with the Oklahoma City Thunder, returning to the franchise for a second stint. Four days later, he made his season debut in a 120–108 win over the Los Angeles Clippers.

== NBA career statistics ==
Legend
GP	Games played	GS	Games started	MPG	Minutes per game
FG%	Field goal percentage	3P%	3-point field goal percentage	FT%	Free throw percentage
RPG	Rebounds per game	APG	Assists per game	SPG	Steals per game
BPG	Blocks per game	PPG	Points per game	**Bold**	Career high
†	Won an NBA championship

=== Regular season ===
Year	Team	GP	GS	MPG	FG%	3P%	FT%	RPG	APG	SPG	BPG	PPG
1998–99	Philadelphia	26	0	4.7	.357	.000	.571	1.4	.1	.2	.2	1.6
1999–00	Philadelphia	28	3	6.8	.389	.000	.545	1.8	.1	.1	.4	1.9
2000–01	Philadelphia	30	3	6.5	.466	.000	.500	1.8	.1	.2	.2	3.2
2000–01	Atlanta	28	19	25.6	.480	.000	.765	**9.0**	.6	.8	1.0	**12.3**
2001–02	Atlanta	**82**	**73**	26.4	.461	.000	.617	7.9	.4	.8	.7	9.7
2002–03	Atlanta	35	0	12.7	.421	.000	.634	3.7	.2	.5	.6	4.6
2003–04	Atlanta	53	1	17.7	.493	.000	.627	5.0	.4	.4	.5	6.5
2003–04	New York	27	23	24.9	.563	.000	.525	7.7	.6	**1.2**	.9	9.1
2004–05	New York	54	54	**28.1**	.509	.000	.708	8.1	.5	1.0	1.0	10.9
2004–05†	San Antonio	23	5	18.0	.387	.000	.571	6.4	.3	.2	**1.4**	6.2
2005–06	San Antonio	80	30	17.4	.504	.000	.785	5.2	.5	.3	.6	6.2
2006–07	Detroit	51	33	15.2	.532	.000	.610	4.5	.2	.5	.8	5.6
2007–08	Detroit	**21**	0	10.9	.475	.000	.433	3.5	.3	.3	.4	3.3
2007–08	Charlotte	**61**	29	23.3	.520	.000	.617	6.9	**1.1**	.6	.9	9.3
2008–09	Charlotte	39	1	8.7	.406	.000	.550	2.0	.2	.1	.4	2.7
2009–10	Charlotte	58	29	17.0	.553	.000	.648	5.2	.5	.3	.7	7.9
2010–11	Charlotte	51	30	16.7	.502	.000	.591	4.9	.3	.3	.9	7.3
2010–11	Oklahoma City	24	7	17.9	.573	.000	.625	4.8	.3	.7	.4	6.9
2011–12	Oklahoma City	63	1	11.0	.467	.000	.565	2.7	.2	.3	.6	2.7
2012–13	Chicago	63	12	11.0	.367	.000	.723	3.1	.4	.3	.5	2.6
2013–14	Chicago	80	1	7.0	.429	.000	.533	2.2	.3	.2	.4	1.6
2014–15	Chicago	23	0	5.6	.433	.000	.333	1.7	.1	.2	.2	1.2
2015–16	Oklahoma City	5	0	3.8	**.600**	.000	**1.000**	.8	.0	.0	.0	1.6
Career		1005	354	15.8	.486	.000	.640	4.7	.4	.4	.6	5.8

=== Playoffs ===
Year	Team	GP	GS	MPG	FG%	3P%	FT%	RPG	APG	SPG	BPG	PPG
1999	Philadelphia	3	0	1.0	.000	.000	.000	.0	.0	.0	.0	.0
2004	New York	4	4	**24.3**	.500	.000	.688	5.8	.3	**1.5**	.8	**10.3**
2005†	San Antonio	**23**	**23**	23.0	.528	**1.000**	.638	**6.7**	.3	.6	**1.0**	7.1
2006	San Antonio	8	3	11.8	**.733**	**1.000**	.722	3.9	.1	.4	.8	4.5
2007	Detroit	2	0	3.0	.500	.000	**1.000**	1.5	.0	.0	.0	2.5
2010	Charlotte	4	0	12.0	.579	.000	.667	2.0	**.5**	.3	.5	6.0
2011	Oklahoma City	14	0	10.6	.412	.000	.400	2.3	.0	.3	.4	2.3
2012	Oklahoma City	8	0	10.4	.500	.000	.500	2.0	.1	.0	.4	2.3
2013	Chicago	12	0	9.5	.512	.000	.571	2.7	.3	.2	.6	3.8
2014	Chicago	2	0	2.5	.000	.000	.000	1.0	.0	.0	.0	.0
2015	Chicago	3	0	4.7	.286	.000	.000	1.7	.0	.0	.3	1.3
2016	Oklahoma City	5	0	2.0	.500	.000	.000	0.6	.0	.0	.2	0.4
Career		88	30	13.1	.514	.667	.639	3.5	.2	.3	.6	4.2

== Personal life ==
Mohammed is a practicing Muslim who fasts for Ramadan. He had lost nearly ten pounds during the 2004–05 season because of his fasting.

Mohammed and his wife Mandi have two daughters and a son. Their son, Sir, currently plays college basketball for Penn.

He created The Nazr Mohammed Foundation which is committed to being a charitable member of the global community by supporting a multitude of worthy causes through personal donations, fundraisers, camps, grants and scholarships and in August 2012, his foundation hosted the Kenwood Academy Capital Improvements Fundraiser.

Mohammed studied Business Management at Kentucky and graduated in May 2020 with a Bachelor’s of Arts and Sciences.
