= 2005–06 San Antonio Spurs season =

- Division champions
- Head coach: Gregg Popovich
- General manager: R.C. Buford
- Owners: Peter Holt
- Arena: AT&T Center

Results
- Record: 63–19 (.768)
- Place: Division: 1st (Southwest); Conference: 1st (Western)
- Playoff finish: Conference Semifinals (lost to Mavericks 3–4)
- Stats at Basketball Reference

Local media
- Television: KENS; KRRT; FSN Southwest
- Radio: WOAI

The 2005–06 San Antonio Spurs season was the team's 30th overall season, the 33rd in San Antonio, and the 30th in the NBA. The Spurs entered the season as the defending NBA champions, having defeated the Detroit Pistons in the 2005 NBA Finals in seven games, winning their third NBA championship. They began the season hoping to improve upon their 59–23 output from the previous season. They bested it by four games, finishing 63–19, and qualified for the playoffs for the ninth straight season. After defeating the Sacramento Kings by six games in the first round, the defending champions faced their in-state rival Dallas Mavericks. They were pushed to seven games and the Spurs ended up losing the deciding game of the series.

Tim Duncan and Tony Parker were selected to play in the 2006 NBA All-Star Game in Houston. This is Parker's first All-Star game appearance.

== Draft picks ==
Round	Pick	Player	Position	Nationality	College
1	28	Ian Mahinmi	C	France	

== Roster ==
2005–06 San Antonio Spurs roster
Players

Pos.	No.	Player	Height	Weight	DOB	From
SG	17	Brent Barry	6 ft 6 in (1.98 m)	185 lb (84 kg)	1971–12–31	Oregon State
SF	12	Bruce Bowen	6 ft 7 in (2.01 m)	185 lb (84 kg)	1971–06–14	Cal State Fullerton
PF	21	Tim Duncan	6 ft 11 in (2.11 m)	248 lb (112 kg)	1976–04–25	Wake Forest
SG	4	Michael Finley	6 ft 7 in (2.01 m)	215 lb (98 kg)	1973–03–06	Wisconsin
SG	20	Manu Ginóbili	6 ft 6 in (1.98 m)	210 lb (95 kg)	1977–07–28	Argentina
PF	5	Robert Horry	6 ft 9 in (2.06 m)	180 lb (82 kg)	1970–08–25	Alabama
PF	40	Sean Marks	6 ft 10 in (2.08 m)	250 lb (113 kg)	1975–08–23	California
C	2	Nazr Mohammed	6 ft 10 in (2.08 m)	221 lb (100 kg)	1977–09–05	Kentucky
C	8	Rasho Nesterovic	7 ft 0 in (2.13 m)	248 lb (112 kg)	1976–05–30	Slovenia
C	7	Fabricio Oberto	6 ft 10 in (2.08 m)	245 lb (111 kg)	1975–03–21	Argentina
PG	9	Tony Parker	6 ft 2 in (1.88 m)	180 lb (82 kg)	1982–05–17	France
SG	34	Melvin Sanders	6 ft 5 in (1.96 m)	210 lb (95 kg)	1981–01–03	Oklahoma State
PG	14	Beno Udrih	6 ft 3 in (1.91 m)	205 lb (93 kg)	1982–07–05	Slovenia
PG	31	Nick Van Exel	6 ft 1 in (1.85 m)	170 lb (77 kg)	1971–11–27	Cincinnati

Coaches
Head coach
- Gregg Popovich
Assistant(s)
- Brett Brown
- Mike Budenholzer
- P. J. Carlesimo
- Chip Engelland
- Don Newman
- Will Sevening (trainer)

Legend
- (DP) Unsigned draft pick
- (FA) Free agent
- (S) Suspended
- Injured

Roster
Updated: November 28, 2005

== Regular season ==
=== Season standings ===
Southwest Division	W	L	PCT	GB	Home	Road	Div
y-San Antonio Spurs	63	19	.768	-	34–7	29–12	13–3
x-Dallas Mavericks	60	22	.732	3	34–7	26–15	13–3
x-Memphis Grizzlies	49	33	.598	14	30–11	19–22	6–10
New Orleans/Oklahoma City Hornets	38	44	.463	25	24–17	14–27	7–9
Houston Rockets	34	48	.415	29	15–26	19–22	1–15

#	Western Conference				
#	Team	W	L	PCT	GB
1	c-San Antonio Spurs	63	19	.768	-
2	y-Phoenix Suns	54	28	.659	9
3	y-Denver Nuggets	44	38	.537	19
4	x-Dallas Mavericks	60	22	.732	3
5	x-Memphis Grizzlies	49	33	.598	14
6	x-Los Angeles Clippers	47	35	.573	16
7	x-Los Angeles Lakers	45	37	.549	18
8	x-Sacramento Kings	44	38	.537	19
9	Utah Jazz	41	41	.500	22
10	New Orleans/Oklahoma City Hornets	38	44	.463	25
11	Seattle SuperSonics	35	47	.427	28
12	Golden State Warriors	34	48	.415	29
13	Houston Rockets	34	48	.415	29
14	Minnesota Timberwolves	33	49	.402	30
15	Portland Trail Blazers	21	61	.256	42

== Game log ==
=== Regular season ===
2005–06 game log
Total: 63–19 (home: 34–7; road: 29–12)
November: 11–3 (home: 6–1; road: 5–2)

Game	Date	Team	Score	High points	High rebounds	High assists	Location Attendance	Record
1	November 1	Denver	W 102–91	Tony Parker (26)	Tim Duncan (10)	Tim Duncan (6)	SBC Center; 18,797	1–0
2	November 4	Cleveland	W 102–76	Tim Duncan (21)	Tim Duncan (10)	Tony Parker (8)	SBC Center; 18,797	2–0
3	November 5	@ Dallas	L 84–103	Tony Parker (24)	Tim Duncan (12)	Tim Duncan (5)	American Airlines Center; 20,468	2–1
4	November 7	@ Chicago	W 104–95 (OT)	Tim Duncan (24)	Tim Duncan (16)	Tony Parker (9)	United Center; 21,827	3–1
5	November 9	@ Charlotte	W 94–86	Tim Duncan (29)	Tim Duncan (10)	Tony Parker (6)	Charlotte Bobcats Arena; 17,237	4–1
6	November 11	@ Boston	W 103–82	Tim Duncan (29)	Tim Duncan (12)	Tony Parker (6)	TD Banknorth Garden; 18,624	5–1
7	November 12	@ Washington	L 95–110	Manu Ginóbili (28)	Tim Duncan (14)	Tony Parker (6)	MCI Center; 20,173	5–2
8	November 15	Atlanta	W 103–79	Manu Ginóbili (24)	Fabricio Oberto (8)	Tony Parker (8)	SBC Center; 18,797	6–2
9	November 17	Houston	W 86–80	Tim Duncan (19)	Tim Duncan (9)	Tony Parker (8)	SBC Center; 18,797	7–2
10	November 19	Phoenix	W 97–91	Tim Duncan (24)	Tim Duncan (13)	Bruce Bowen (4)	SBC Center; 18,797	8–2
11	November 21	@ Sacramento	W 96–93	Tony Parker (23)	Tim Duncan (19)	Tim Duncan, Manu Ginóbili (4)	ARCO Arena; 17,317	9–2
12	November 23	@ Golden State	W 113–89	Tony Parker (26)	Tim Duncan (12)	Tony Parker (6)	Oakland Arena; 18,768	10–2
13	November 25	Chicago	L 99–106	Tim Duncan (24)	Tim Duncan (11)	Tony Parker (6)	SBC Center; 18,797	10–3
14	November 29	L. A. Lakers	W 90–84	Manu Ginóbili (22)	Tim Duncan (9)	Tim Duncan, Tony Parker (5)	SBC Center; 18,797	11–3

December: 13–4 (home: 8–0; road: 5–4)

Game	Date	Team	Score	High points	High rebounds	High assists	Location Attendance	Record
15	December 1	@ Dallas	W 92–90	Tony Parker (30)	Tim Duncan (14)	Tony Parker (5)	American Airlines Center; 20,076	12–3
16	December 3	Philadelphia	W 100–91	Tony Parker (20)	Tim Duncan (12)	Tony Parker (7)	SBC Center; 18,797	13–3
17	December 5	@ Orlando	W 110–85	Tim Duncan (26)	Tim Duncan (12)	Tony Parker (7)	TD Waterhouse Centre; 14,661	14–3
18	December 7	Miami	W 98–84	Tim Duncan (28)	Tim Duncan (16)	Tony Parker (11)	SBC Center; 18,797	15–3
19	December 9	Boston	W 101–89	Tim Duncan (20)	Tim Duncan (11)	Nick Van Exel (6)	SBC Center; 18,797	16–3
20	December 10	@ Atlanta	L 84–94	Tony Parker (20)	Manu Ginóbili, Tim Duncan (10)	Michael Finley (6)	Philips Arena; 16,678	16–4
21	December 13	L. A. Clippers	W 95–87 (OT)	Tim Duncan (27)	Tim Duncan (22)	Tony Parker (7)	SBC Center; 18,797	17–4
22	December 15	@ Minnesota	W 90–88	Michael Finley (21)	Tim Duncan (9)	Tony Parker (7)	Target Center; 17,003	18–4
23	December 17	Sacramento	W 90–89	Tony Parker (25)	Tim Duncan (14)	Tony Parker (12)	SBC Center; 18,797	19–4
24	December 18	@ New Orleans/Oklahoma City	L 76–89	Michael Finley, Tony Parker (17)	Tim Duncan (8)	Tony Parker (6)	Ford Center; 19,297	19–5
25	December 20	@ Milwaukee	L 107–109 (OT)	Tim Duncan (34)	Tim Duncan (13)	Tony Parker (11)	Bradley Center; 16,865	19–6
26	December 21	@ New York	W 109–96	Michael Finley (19)	Rasho Nesterovic, Nazr Mohammed, Robert Horry (5)	Tony Parker (10)	Madison Square Garden; 19,763	20–6
27	December 23	Toronto	W 95–90	Tim Duncan (27)	Tim Duncan (10)	Tim Duncan (8)	SBC Center; 18,797	21–6
28	December 25	@ Detroit	L 70–85	Tony Parker (19)	Tim Duncan (11)	Tim Duncan (4)	The Palace of Auburn Hills; 22,076	21–7
29	December 27	Indiana	W 99–86	Tony Parker (27)	Tim Duncan (9)	Tony Parker (6)	SBC Center; 18,797	22–7
30	December 29	New Orleans/Oklahoma City	W 111–84	Michael Finley (18)	Tim Duncan (7)	Tony Parker (7)	SBC Center; 18,797	23–7
31	December 31	@ Denver	W 98–88	Tim Duncan (25)	Tim Duncan (10)	Manu Ginóbili (8)	Pepsi Center; 18,296	24–7

January: 11–3 (home: 7–2; road: 4–1)

Game	Date	Team	Score	High points	High rebounds	High assists	Location Attendance	Record
32	January 4	Portland	W 106–75	Tim Duncan, Tony Parker (18)	Tim Duncan (13)	Tony Parker (7)	SBC Center; 18,797	25–7
33	January 6	Minnesota	W 83–77	Tony Parker (23)	Tim Duncan (14)	Tony Parker (7)	SBC Center; 18,797	26–7
34	January 7	@ Phoenix	L 86–91	Tim Duncan, Manu Ginóbili (19)	Tim Duncan (12)	Tony Parker (6)	America West Arena; 18,422	26–8
35	January 10	New Jersey	W 96–91	Tim Duncan (27)	Tim Duncan (12)	Bruce Bowen (5)	SBC Center; 18,797	27–8
36	January 12	Detroit	L 68–83	Tim Duncan, Tony Parker (17)	Tim Duncan (13)	Michael Finley (3)	SBC Center; 18,797	27–9
37	January 14	Memphis	W 80–79	Manu Ginóbili (20)	Tim Duncan (13)	Manu Ginóbili (7)	SBC Center; 18,797	28–9
38	January 16	@ Memphis	W 93–83	Tony Parker (28)	Tim Duncan (12)	Manu Ginóbili (5)	FedEx Forum; 18,119	29–9
39	January 18	Milwaukee	W 95–92	Tim Duncan (27)	Tim Duncan (9)	Tony Parker, Manu Ginóbili (7)	SBC Center; 18,797	30–9
40	January 20	@ Miami	W 101–94	Tony Parker (38)	Tim Duncan (11)	Tony Parker, Manu Ginóbili (5)	AmericanAirlines Arena; 20,287	31–9
41	January 22	Denver	L 85–89	Nazr Mohammed (17)	Tim Duncan (13)	Tony Parker (7)	SBC Center; 18,797	31–10
42	January 24	Charlotte	W 104–76	Beno Udrih (17)	Tim Duncan (9)	Beno Udrih (8)	SBC Center; 18,797	32–10
43	January 25	@ New Orleans/Oklahoma City	W 84–68	Tim Duncan (17)	Bruce Bowen (8)	Tony Parker (3)	Ford Center; 19,289	33–10
44	January 28	Minnesota	W 102–88	Tim Duncan (28)	Tim Duncan (16)	Tony Parker (5)	SBC Center; 18,797	34–10
45	January 30	@ Utah	W 79–70	Tim Duncan (19)	Nazr Mohammed (9)	Tony Parker (6)	Delta Center; 19,384	35–10

February: 9–2 (home: 3–0; road: 6–2)

Game	Date	Team	Score	High points	High rebounds	High assists	Location Attendance	Record
46	February 1	@ Portland	W 86–82	Manu Ginóbili (22)	Tim Duncan (17)	Manu Ginóbili (4)	Rose Garden Arena; 16,638	36–10
47	February 2	@ Golden State	W 89–86	Tony Parker (23)	Tim Duncan (11)	Beno Udrih, Tony Parker (6)	Oakland Arena; 17,223	37–10
48	February 8	@ Toronto	W 125–118 (OT)	Tony Parker (32)	Rasho Nesterovic (8)	Tony Parker (13)	Air Canada Centre; 19,284	38–10
49	February 10	@ New Jersey	W 83–73	Manu Ginóbili (22)	Tim Duncan (7)	Tim Duncan, Tony Parker (6)	Continental Airlines Arena; 19,096	39–10
50	February 12	@ Indiana	W 92–88	Manu Ginóbili (29)	Tim Duncan (11)	Tony Parker (6)	Conseco Fieldhouse; 18,345	40–10
51	February 13	@ Cleveland	L 87–101	Tim Duncan (19)	Tim Duncan (10)	Tim Duncan (5)	Gund Arena; 19,486	40–11
52	February 15	@ Philadelphia	L 100–103 (OT)	Tony Parker (23)	Nazr Mohammed (20)	Manu Ginóbili (8)	Wachovia Center; 17,335	40–12
All-Star Break
53	February 21	Seattle	W 103–78	Tony Parker (30)	Tim Duncan (16)	Tony Parker (6)	SBC Center; 18,797	41–12
54	February 24	@ Memphis	W 83–80	Tim Duncan (19)	Tim Duncan (16)	Manu Ginóbili (4)	FedEx Forum; 18,119	42–12
55	February 25	Golden State	W 92–75	Nazr Mohammed (15)	Tim Duncan (16)	Tony Parker (6)	SBC Center; 18,797	43–12
56	February 27	New York	W 121–93	Michael Finley (22)	Tim Duncan (7)	Tony Parker (12)	SBC Center; 18,797	44–12

March: 12–4 (home: 6–1; road: 6–3)

Game	Date	Team	Score	High points	High rebounds	High assists	Location Attendance	Record
57	March 2	Dallas	W 98–89	Tony Parker (23)	Bruce Bowen (8)	Tony Parker (4)	SBC Center; 18,797	45–12
58	March 4	Portland	W 101–81	Tim Duncan (22)	Tim Duncan (15)	Tony Parker (5)	SBC Center; 18,797	46–12
59	March 6	@ L. A. Lakers	W 103–96	Tony Parker, Manu Ginóbili, Michael Finley (21)	Tim Duncan (7)	Tim Duncan (9)	Staples Center; 18,997	47–12
60	March 7	@ L. A. Clippers	L 85–98	Tony Parker (20)	Tim Duncan (7)	Tim Duncan (7)	Staples Center; 18,409	47–13
61	March 9	@ Phoenix	W 117–93	Tony Parker (29)	Nazr Mohammed (11)	Brent Barry (7)	America West Arena; 18,422	48–13
62	March 10	L. A. Lakers	L 92–100	Michael Finley, Brent Barry (16)	Michael Finley (9)	Manu Ginóbili (6)	SBC Center; 18,797	48–14
63	March 12	Houston	W 88–81	Tim Duncan (20)	Tim Duncan (10)	Manu Ginóbili (5)	SBC Center; 18,797	49–14
64	March 14	New Orleans/Oklahoma City	W 96–81	Tony Parker (20)	Tim Duncan, Nazr Mohammed (8)	Tony Parker (11)	SBC Center; 18,797	50–14
65	March 17	Phoenix	W 108–102	Nazr Mohammed (30)	Nazr Mohammed (16)	Tim Duncan (7)	SBC Center; 18,797	51–14
66	March 18	@ Houston	W 92–77	Tony Parker (23)	Tim Duncan, Nazr Mohammed (8)	Tony Parker (8)	Toyota Center; 18,234	52–14
67	March 21	Golden State	W 107–96	Tony Parker (29)	Tim Duncan (13)	Tony Parker (7)	SBC Center; 18,797	53–14
68	March 22	@ Denver	L 92–104	Manu Ginóbili (26)	Tim Duncan (6)	Tony Parker (6)	Pepsi Center; 17,455	53–15
69	March 24	@ Portland	W 98–79	Brent Barry (23)	Tim Duncan (7)	Tim Duncan (6)	Rose Garden Arena; 17,018	54–15
70	March 26	@ Seattle	L 102–106	Tim Duncan (28)	Tim Duncan (10)	Tony Parker (12)	KeyArena; 16,861	54–16
71	March 28	@ L. A. Clippers	W 98–87	Tim Duncan, Michael Finley (20)	Tim Duncan (13)	Manu Ginóbili (9)	Staples Center; 17,978	55–16
72	March 30	@ L. A. Lakers	W 96–85	Tim Duncan (20)	Tim Duncan (13)	Manu Ginóbili (6)	Staples Center; 18,997	56–16

April: 7–3 (home: 4–3; road: 3–0)

Game	Date	Team	Score	High points	High rebounds	High assists	Location Attendance	Record
73	April 1	Washington	W 96–85	Tony Parker (28)	Tim Duncan (14)	Tony Parker (6)	SBC Center; 18,797	57–16
74	April 4	Washington	W 95–86	Manu Ginóbili (26)	Tim Duncan (13)	Tony Parker (8)	Delta Center; 18,064	58–16
75	April 5	Sacramento	L 87–97	Tony Parker (16)	Nazr Mohammed (9)	Tony Parker (5)	SBC Center; 18,797	58–17
76	April 7	Dallas	L 86–92	Manu Ginóbili (22)	Tim Duncan (9)	Manu Ginóbili (4)	SBC Center; 18,797	58–18
77	April 9	Memphis	W 83–81	Tim Duncan (23)	Tim Duncan (12)	Tim Duncan (5)	SBC Center; 18,797	59–18
77	April 9	Memphis	W 83–81	Tim Duncan (23)	Tim Duncan (12)	Tim Duncan (5)	SBC Center; 18,797	59–18
78	April 11	Memphis	W 104–95	Tony Parker (27)	Tim Duncan (14)	Tony Parker (9)	SBC Center; 18,797	60–18
79	April 13	Orlando	L 80–92	Tim Duncan (31)	Tim Duncan (13)	Tim Duncan (6)	SBC Center; 18,797	60–19
80	April 16	@ Minnesota	W 103–90	Beno Udrih (15)	Tim Duncan (8)	Bruce Bowen (5)	Target Center; 15,231	61–19
81	April 17	Utah	W 115–82	Manu Ginóbili (18)	Rasho Nesterovic (11)	Nick Van Exel (6)	SBC Center; 18,797	62–19
82	April 19	@ Houston	W 89–87	Brent Barry (19)	Nazr Mohammed, Robert Horry (6)	Manu Ginóbili (6)	Toyota Center; 17,613	63–19

2005–06 season schedule

=== Playoffs ===
2006 playoff game log
First Round: 4–2 (home: 3–0; road: 1–2)

Game	Date	Team	Score	High points	High rebounds	High assists	Location Attendance	Series
1	April 22	Sacramento	W 122–88	Tony Parker (25)	Nazr Mohammed (17)	Brent Barry (6)	AT&T Center; 18,797	1–0
2	April 25	Sacramento	W 128–119 (OT)	Manu Ginóbili (32)	Tim Duncan (13)	Tony Parker (10)	AT&T Center; 18,797	2–0
3	April 28	@ Sacramento	L 93–94	Tim Duncan (29)	Tim Duncan (12)	Tony Parker (6)	ARCO Arena; 17,317	2–1
4	April 30	@ Sacramento	L 84–102	Tony Parker (22)	Tim Duncan (8)	Bruce Bowen (3)	ARCO Arena; 17,317	2–2
5	May 2	Sacramento	W 109–98	Manu Ginóbili (27)	Duncan, Ginóbili (9)	Tim Duncan (5)	AT&T Center; 18,797	3–2
6	May 5	@ Sacramento	W 105–83	Tony Parker (31)	Robert Horry (7)	Manu Ginóbili (5)	ARCO Arena; 17,317	4–2

Conference Semifinals: 3–4 (home: 2–2; road: 1–2)

Game	Date	Team	Score	High points	High rebounds	High assists	Location Attendance	Series
1	May 7	Dallas	W 87–85	Tim Duncan (31)	Tim Duncan (13)	Duncan, Parker (4)	AT&T Center; 18,797	1–0
2	May 9	Dallas	L 91–113	Tim Duncan (28)	Tim Duncan (9)	Tim Duncan (3)	AT&T Center; 18,797	1–1
3	May 13	@ Dallas	L 103–104	Tim Duncan (35)	Tim Duncan (12)	Tony Parker (4)	American Airlines Center; 20,865	1–2
4	May 15	@ Dallas	L 118–123 (OT)	Tony Parker (33)	Tim Duncan (13)	Tim Duncan (6)	American Airlines Center; 20,969	1–3
5	May 17	Dallas	W 98–97	Tim Duncan (36)	Tim Duncan (10)	Manu Ginóbili (5)	AT&T Center; 18,797	2–3
6	May 19	@ Dallas	W 91–86	Manu Ginóbili (30)	Manu Ginóbili (10)	Tony Parker (3)	American Airlines Center; 20,986	3–3
7	May 22	Dallas	L 111–119 (OT)	Tim Duncan (41)	Tim Duncan (15)	Tim Duncan (6)	AT&T Center	3–4

2006 schedule

== Player statistics ==
=== Ragular season ===
Player	POS	GP	GS	MP	REB	AST	STL	BLK	PTS	MPG	RPG	APG	SPG	BPG	PPG
Bruce Bowen	SF	82	82	2,755	320	126	79	30	619	33.6	3.9	1.5	1.0	.4	7.5
Tim Duncan	PF	80	80	2,784	881	253	70	162	1,485	34.8	11.0	3.2	.9	2.0	18.6
Tony Parker	PG	80	80	2,715	261	460	83	4	1,510	33.9	3.3	5.8	1.0	.1	18.9
Rasho Nesterović	C	80	51	1,515	309	33	21	88	362	18.9	3.9	.4	.3	1.1	4.5
Nazr Mohammed	C	80	30	1,389	418	40	21	49	493	17.4	5.2	.5	.3	.6	6.2
Michael Finley	SG	77	18	2,038	247	116	37	7	780	26.5	3.2	1.5	.5	.1	10.1
Brent Barry	SG	74	5	1,259	159	123	39	27	431	17.0	2.1	1.7	.5	.4	5.8
Manu Ginóbili	SG	65	56	1,813	230	235	101	26	981	27.9	3.5	3.6	1.6	.4	15.1
Nick Van Exel	PG	65	2	986	91	123	16	3	355	15.2	1.4	1.9	.2	.0	5.5
Robert Horry	PF	63	3	1,182	242	79	43	51	321	18.8	3.8	1.3	.7	.8	5.1
Fabricio Oberto	C	59	0	490	123	27	9	11	103	8.3	2.1	.5	.2	.2	1.7
Beno Udrih	PG	54	3	586	52	92	14	2	275	10.9	1.0	1.7	.3	.0	5.1
Sean Marks	PF	25	0	181	43	7	5	7	81	7.2	1.7	.3	.2	.3	3.2
Melvin Sanders	SG	16	0	113	23	3	5	0	41	7.1	1.4	.2	.3	.0	2.6
Alex Scales	SG	1	0	0	0	0	0	0	0	.0	.0	.0	.0	.0	.0

=== Playoffs ===
Player	POS	GP	GS	MP	REB	AST	STL	BLK	PTS	MPG	RPG	APG	SPG	BPG	PPG
Tim Duncan	PF	13	13	493	137	43	11	25	336	37.9	10.5	3.3	.8	1.9	25.8
Tony Parker	PG	13	13	475	47	50	13	1	274	36.5	3.6	3.8	1.0	.1	21.1
Bruce Bowen	SF	13	13	442	28	16	11	8	80	34.0	2.2	1.2	.8	.6	6.2
Manu Ginóbili	SG	13	11	426	59	39	19	7	239	32.8	4.5	3.0	1.5	.5	18.4
Robert Horry	PF	13	5	224	48	11	5	9	55	17.2	3.7	.8	.4	.7	4.2
Michael Finley	SG	13	4	411	49	18	8	3	136	31.6	3.8	1.4	.6	.2	10.5
Brent Barry	SG	13	2	301	32	22	9	3	101	23.2	2.5	1.7	.7	.2	7.8
Nick Van Exel	PG	12	0	133	12	17	3	2	26	11.1	1.0	1.4	.3	.2	2.2
Rasho Nesterović	C	9	1	114	30	1	2	5	25	12.7	3.3	.1	.2	.6	2.8
Nazr Mohammed	C	8	3	94	31	1	3	6	36	11.8	3.9	.1	.4	.8	4.5
Beno Udrih	PG	7	0	47	4	8	0	0	25	6.7	.6	1.1	.0	.0	3.6
Fabricio Oberto	C	7	0	34	6	1	1	3	7	4.9	.9	.1	.1	.4	1.0

== Awards and records ==
- Tim Duncan, All-NBA Second Team
- Bruce Bowen, NBA All-Defensive First Team
- Tim Duncan, NBA All-Defensive Second Team
