= Milanlu-ye Olya =

Village in North Khorasan province, Iran

Milanlu-ye Olya Persian: ميلانلوعليا
- Village
- Location within Iran
- Coordinates: 37°42′38″N 58°02′18″E
- Country: Iran
- Province: North Khorasan
- County: Shirvan
- District: Sarhad
- Rural District: Jirestan

Population (2016)
  - Total: 484
- Time zone: UTC+3:30 (IRST)

Milanlu-ye Olya (Persian: ميلانلوعليا) (Note: Also romanized as Mīlānlū-ye ‘Olyā; also known as Mīlānlū Bālā, Mīlānlū-ye Bālā, and Milānlu yi Bāla) is a village in Jirestan Rural District of Sarhad District in Shirvan County, North Khorasan province, Iran.

== Demographics ==
=== Population ===
At the time of the 2006 National Census, the village's population was 377 in 88 households. The following census in 2011 counted 354 people in 100 households. The 2016 census measured the population of the village as 484 people in 126 households.
