= 2005–06 Los Angeles Lakers season =

NBA professional basketball team season

- Head coach: Phil Jackson
- President: Jim Buss (vice)
- General manager: Mitch Kupchak
- Owner: Jerry Buss
- Arena: Staples Center

Results
- Record: 45–37 (.549)
- Place: Division: 3rd (Pacific); Conference: 7th (Western)
- Playoff finish: First Round (lost to Suns 3–4)
- Stats at Basketball Reference

Local media
- Television: KCAL-TV; FSN West
- Radio: KLAC

The 2005–06 Los Angeles Lakers season was the franchise's 58th season in the National Basketball Association (NBA) and 60th season overall. Before the season, the team rehired former coach Phil Jackson. During a January 22, 2006 game against the Toronto Raptors, Lakers superstar Kobe Bryant scored 81 points. The Lakers finished in third place in the Pacific Division and were seeded seventh in the Western Conference; their record was 45-37. The Lakers' season ended when the team was eliminated in seven games by the Phoenix Suns in the first round of the playoffs after holding a 3–1 series lead.

== Draft picks ==
The Lakers had three picks going into the 2005 NBA draft. The Lakers chose seven-footer Andrew Bynum as the 10th pick of the draft. Los Angeles also picked Ronny Turiaf and Von Wafer as the 37th and 39th picks, respectively.

Round	Pick	Player	Position	Nationality	College
1	10	Andrew Bynum	Center	United States	St. Joseph HS (New Jersey)
2	37	Ronny Turiaf	Forward	France	Gonzaga University
2	39	Von Wafer	Guard	United States	Florida State University

== Roster ==
2005–06 Los Angeles Lakers roster
Players

Pos.	No.	Player	Height	Weight	DOB	From
C	54	Kwame Brown	6 ft 11 in (2.11 m)	270 lb (122 kg)	1982-03-10	Glynn Academy (GA)
G	8	Kobe Bryant	6 ft 6 in (1.98 m)	220 lb (100 kg)	1978-08-23	Lower Merion HS (PA)
C	17	Andrew Bynum	7 ft 0 in (2.13 m)	275 lb (125 kg)	1987-10-27	St. Joseph HS (NJ)
F	43	Brian Cook	6 ft 9 in (2.06 m)	258 lb (117 kg)	1980-12-04	Illinois
F	3	Devean George	6 ft 8 in (2.03 m)	220 lb (100 kg)	1977-08-29	Augsburg
G	11	Devin Green	6 ft 7 in (2.01 m)	210 lb (95 kg)	1982-10-25	Hampton
F	24	Jim Jackson	6 ft 6 in (1.98 m)	220 lb (100 kg)	1970-10-14	Ohio State
G	2	Aaron McKie	6 ft 5 in (1.96 m)	209 lb (95 kg)	1972-10-02	Temple
F	14	Slava Medvedenko	6 ft 10 in (2.08 m)	250 lb (113 kg)	1979-04-04	Ukraine
C	31	Chris Mihm	7 ft 0 in (2.13 m)	265 lb (120 kg)	1979-07-16	Texas
F	7	Lamar Odom	6 ft 10 in (2.08 m)	230 lb (104 kg)	1979-11-06	Rhode Island
G	1	Smush Parker	6 ft 4 in (1.93 m)	180 lb (82 kg)	1981-06-01	Fordham
G	9	Laron Profit	6 ft 5 in (1.96 m)	204 lb (93 kg)	1977-08-05	Maryland
C	21	Ronny Turiaf	6 ft 10 in (2.08 m)	249 lb (113 kg)	1983-01-13	Gonzaga
G	18	Sasha Vujačić	6 ft 7 in (2.01 m)	195 lb (88 kg)	1984-03-08	Slovenia
G	23	Von Wafer	6 ft 5 in (1.96 m)	210 lb (95 kg)	1985-07-21	Florida State
F	4	Luke Walton	6 ft 8 in (2.03 m)	232 lb (105 kg)	1980-03-28	Arizona

Coaches
Head coach
- Phil Jackson
Assistant(s)
- Frank Hamblen
- Craig Hodges
- Kurt Rambis
- Brian Shaw
- Kareem Abdul-Jabbar

Legend
- (DP) Unsigned draft pick
- (FA) Free agent
- (S) Suspended
- Injured

Roster

=== Injuries ===
- Wednesday November 16, 2005: Slava Medvedenko was sidelined for the rest of the season after he suffered a herniated disc.
- Friday November 18, 2005: Kwame Brown strained his right hamstring and was sidelined for two weeks.
- Tuesday December 20, 2005: Laron Profit ruptured his Achilles' tendon during a game against the Dallas Mavericks.

=== Player salaries ===
Rank	Player	Salary
1	Kobe Bryant	$15,946,875
2	Lamar Odom	$11,465,334
3	Kwame Brown	$7,500,000
4	Devean George	$5,000,600
5	Chris Mihm	$3,796,875
6	Stanislav Medvedenko	$3,000,000
7	Aaron McKie	$2,500,000
8	Andrew Bynum	$1,888,680
9	Luke Walton	$1,250,000
10	Brian Cook	$865,800
11	Sasha Vujačić	$910,440
12	Smush Parker	$745,248
13	Laron Profit	$835,810
14	Devin Green	$398,762
15	Von Wafer	$398,762

== Regular season ==
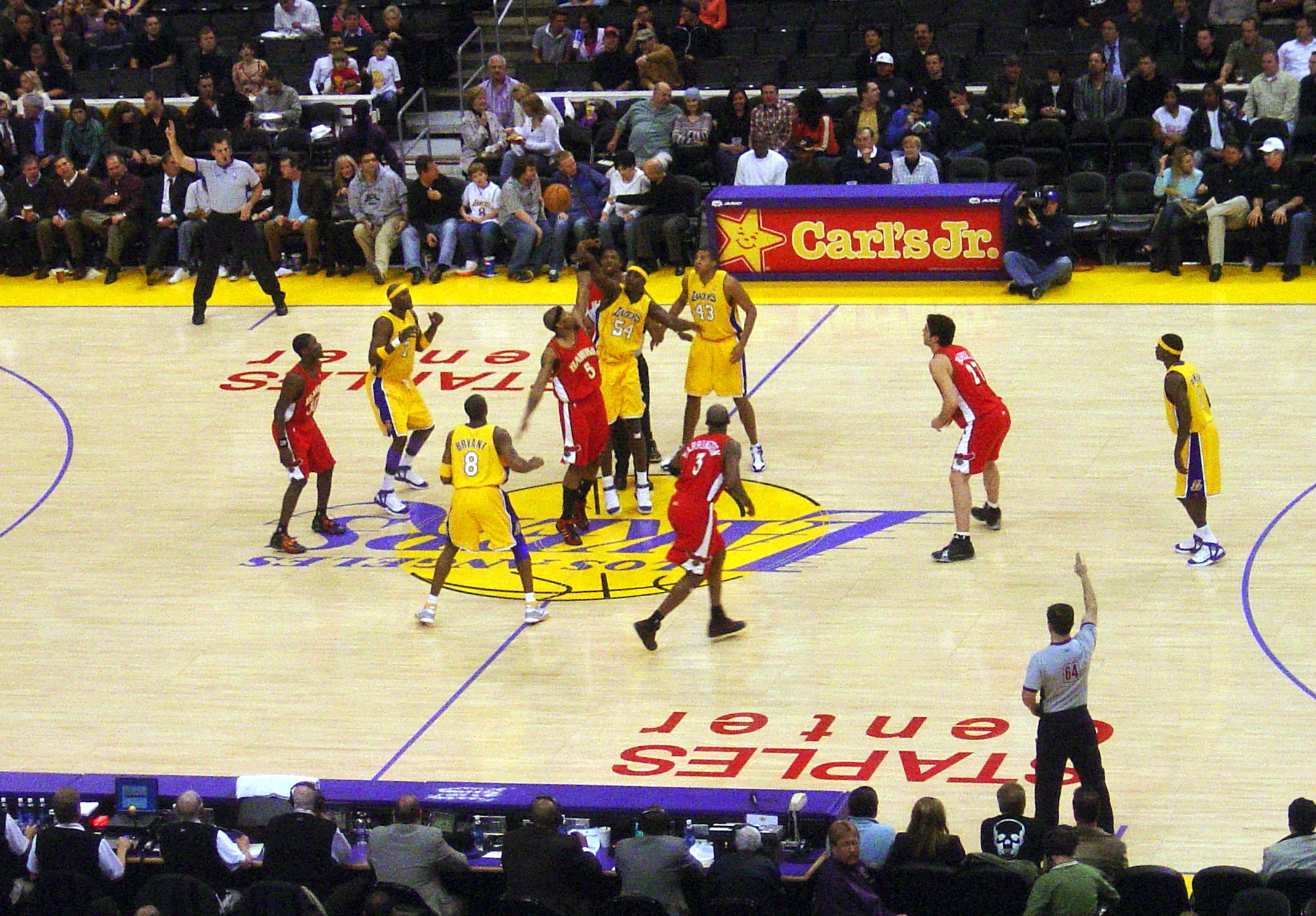
Kwame Brown winning a jump ball against the Atlanta Hawks, February 2006

The Lakers opened the season with an overtime victory against the Denver Nuggets. Despite dipping below .500 during the November, the team recovered and finished 2005 with a 15–14 record. In a January 22, 2006 home game against the Toronto Raptors, Kobe Bryant scored 81 points. The team went into the All Star Break with a 26–26 record. The team finished the season with a five-game winning streak (its longest of the season) and an overall 45–37 record. The Lakers finished third in the Pacific Division and qualified for the playoffs as the seventh seed in the Western Conference.

=== Season standings ===
Pacific Division	W	L	PCT	GB	Home	Road	Div
y-Phoenix Suns	54	28	.659	-	31–10	23–18	10–6
x-Los Angeles Clippers	47	35	.573	7	27–14	20–21	7–9
x-Los Angeles Lakers	45	37	.549	9	27–14	18–23	9–7
x-Sacramento Kings	44	38	.537	10	27–14	17–24	10–6
Golden State Warriors	34	48	.415	20	21–20	13–28	4–12

#	Western Conference				
#	Team	W	L	PCT	GB
1	c-San Antonio Spurs	63	19	.768	-
2	y-Phoenix Suns	54	28	.659	9
3	y-Denver Nuggets	44	38	.537	19
4	x-Dallas Mavericks	60	22	.732	3
5	x-Memphis Grizzlies	49	33	.598	14
6	x-Los Angeles Clippers	47	35	.573	16
7	x-Los Angeles Lakers	45	37	.549	18
8	x-Sacramento Kings	44	38	.537	19
9	Utah Jazz	41	41	.500	22
10	New Orleans/Oklahoma City Hornets	38	44	.463	25
11	Seattle SuperSonics	35	47	.427	28
12	Golden State Warriors	34	48	.415	29
13	Houston Rockets	34	48	.415	29
14	Minnesota Timberwolves	33	49	.402	30
15	Portland Trail Blazers	21	61	.256	42

== Playoffs ==
The Lakers' season ended when the team was eliminated in seven games by the Phoenix Suns in the first round of the playoffs after holding a 3–1 series lead.

== Game log ==
=== Pre-season ===
2005 preseason game log
Total: 6–2
Preseason

Game	Date	Team	Score	High points	High rebounds	High assists	Location Attendance	Record
1	October 11	Golden State	W 101-93	Kobe Bryant (28)	Chris Mihm (9)	Kobe Bryant (5)	Stan Sheriff Center (Honolulu, HI); 7,307	1–0
2	October 12	Golden State	L 81-112	3 players tied (11)	Lamar Odom (9)	Odom & Parker (3)	Stan Sheriff Center (Honolulu, HI); 7,646	1-1
3	October 18	Washington	W 111-108 (OT)	Kobe Bryant (28)	Lamar Odom (8)	Lamar Odom (6)	Rabobank Arena (Bakersfield, CA); 6,536	2–1
4	October 20	Denver	L 94-105	Kwame Brown (16)	Lamar Odom (9)	Lamar Odom (7)	Staples Center; 15,047	2-2
5	October 21	Charlotte	W 109-93	Kobe Bryant (25)	Kwame Brown (7)	Laron Profit (6)	Staples Center; 15,568	3–2
6	October 23	Charlotte	W 98-97	Kobe Bryant (25)	Chris Mihm (11)	Lamar Odom (6)	iPayOne Center (San Diego, CA); 7,058	4–2
7	October 25	Utah	W 95-85	Kobe Bryant (20)	Kwame Brown (9)	Odom & Parker (4)	Arrowhead Pond (Anaheim, CA); 15,253	5–2
8	October 28	Sacramento	W 105-103	Kobe Bryant (24)	Brown & Odom (7)	McKie & Parada (3)	Thomas & Mack Center (Las Vegas, NV); 14,759	6–2

2005–06 season schedule

=== Regular season ===
2005–06 game log
Total: 45–37 (home: 27–14; road: 18-23)
November: 5–8 (home: 3–4; road: 2–4)

Game	Date	Team	Score	High points	High rebounds	High assists	Location Attendance	Record
1	November 2	@ Denver	W 99-97 (OT)	Kobe Bryant (33)	Lamar Odom (9)	Lamar Odom (7)	Pepsi Center; 19,245	1–0
2	November 3	Phoenix	L 112-122	Kobe Bryant (39)	Lamar Odom (16)	Lamar Odom (8)	Staples Center; 18,997	1-1
3	November 6	Denver	W 112-92	Kobe Bryant (37)	Chris Mihm (13)	Bryant & Parker (5)	Staples Center; 18,997	2–1
4	November 8	@ Atlanta	W 103-97	Kobe Bryant (37)	Lamar Odom (11)	Lamar Odom (6)	Philips Arena; 19,523	3–1
5	November 9	@ Minnesota	L 74-88	Kobe Bryant (28)	Kwame Brown (13)	Kobe Bryant (4)	Target Center; 15,192	3–2
6	November 11	@ Philadelphia	L 81-85	Chris Mihm (20)	Lamar Odom (12)	Kobe Bryant (7)	Wachovia Center; 20,292	3-3
7	November 14	@ Memphis	L 73-85	Kobe Bryant (18)	Chris Mihm (10)	Lamar Odom (4)	FedEx Forum; 16,671	3–4
8	November 16	New York	W 97-92	Kobe Bryant (42)	Mihm & Odom (9)	Lamar Odom (6)	Staples Center; 18,997	4-4
9	November 18	L.A. Clippers	L 91-97	Kobe Bryant (36)	Chris Mihm (9)	Bryant & Odom (5)	Staples Center; 18,997	4–5
10	November 20	Chicago	L 93-96	Kobe Bryant (43)	Lamar Odom (10)	Lamar Odom (5)	Staples Center; 18,997	4–6
11	November 24	Seattle	W 108-96	Kobe Bryant (34)	Lamar Odom (12)	Lamar Odom (6)	Staples Center; 18,070	5–6
12	November 27	New Jersey	L 96-102 (OT)	Kobe Bryant (46)	Mihm & Odom (10)	Odom & Walton (5)	Staples Center; 18,528	5–7
13	November 29	@ San Antonio	L 84-90	Lamar Odom (27)	Lamar Odom (16)	3 players tied (3)	SBC Center; 18,797	5–8

December: 10–6 (home: 3–3; road: 7–3)

Game	Date	Team	Score	High points	High rebounds	High assists	Location Attendance	Record
14	December 1	@ Utah	W 105-101 (OT)	Kobe Bryant (30)	Lamar Odom (13)	Lamar Odom (9)	Delta Center; 18,008	6–8
15	December 2	Minnesota	L 108-113	Lamar Odom (24)	Kobe Bryant (9)	Bryant & Odom (8)	Staples Center; 18,997	6–9
16	December 4	Charlotte	W 99-98	Kobe Bryant (29)	Lamar Odom (10)	Lamar Odom (11)	Staples Center; 18,506	7–9
17	December 6	@ Milwaukee	W 111-92	Kobe Bryant (33)	Lamar Odom (9)	Lamar Odom (8)	Bradley Center; 15,185	8–9
18	December 7	@ Toronto	W 102-91	Lamar Odom (19)	George & Mihm (8)	Kobe Bryant (9)	Air Canada Centre; 18,821	9-9
19	December 9	@ Chicago	W 93-80	Kobe Bryant (23)	Kobe Bryant (9)	Kobe Bryant (8)	United Center; 22,410	10–9
20	December 10	@ Minnesota	L 82-95	Kobe Bryant (35)	Chris Mihm (11)	Lamar Odom (4)	Target Center; 18,739	10-10
21	December 12	@ Dallas	W 109-106	Kobe Bryant (43)	Lamar Odom (11)	Lamar Odom (5)	American Airlines Center; 19,680	11–10
22	December 14	@ Memphis	W 94-79	Kobe Bryant (27)	Bryant & Mihm (8)	Odom & Walton (5)	FedEx Forum; 16,591	12–10
23	December 16	Washington	W 97-91	Kobe Bryant (41)	Lamar Odom (11)	Luke Walton (6)	Staples Center; 18,997	13–10
24	December 18	Houston	L 74-76	Kobe Bryant (24)	Lamar Odom (7)	Kobe Bryant (6)	Staples Center; 18,997	13–11
25	December 20	Dallas	W 112-90	Kobe Bryant (62)	3 players tied (8)	Luke Walton (5)	Staples Center; 18,997	14–11
26	December 23	@ Orlando	W 104-88	Kobe Bryant (21)	Kwame Brown (9)	Kobe Bryant (9)	TD Waterhouse Centre; 17,283	15–11
27	December 25	@ Miami	L 92-97	Kobe Bryant (37)	Lamar Odom (16)	Bryant & Odom (6)	American Airlines Arena; 20,277	15–12
28	December 26	@ Washington	L 91-94	Kobe Bryant (31)	Chris Mihm (9)	Lamar Odom (7)	MCI Center; 20,173	15–13
29	December 28	Memphis	L 99-100 (OT)	Kobe Bryant (45)	Lamar Odom (15)	Odom & Parker (5)	Staples Center; 18,997	15–14

January: 9–6 (home: 6–1; road: 3–5)

Game	Date	Team	Score	High points	High rebounds	High assists	Location Attendance	Record
30	January 1	Utah	L 94-98	Brian Cook (19)	Lamar Odom (12)	Lamar Odom (8)	Staples Center; 18,310	15-15
31	January 3	@ Utah	L 80-90	Lamar Odom (25)	Lamar Odom (8)	Odom & Parker (4)	Delta Center; 19,013	15–16
32	January 6	Philadelphia	W 119-93	Kobe Bryant (48)	Kobe Bryant (10)	Lamar Odom (12)	Staples Center; 18,997	16-16
33	January 7	@ L.A. Clippers	W 112-109	Kobe Bryant (50)	3 players tied (10)	Kobe Bryant (8)	Staples Center; 20,154	17–16
34	January 9	Indiana	W 96-90	Kobe Bryant (45)	Lamar Odom (12)	Kobe Bryant (5)	Staples Center; 18,997	18–16
35	January 11	@ Portland	L 103-113	Kobe Bryant (41)	Chris Mihm (7)	Lamar Odom (5)	Rose Garden; 16,421	18–17
36	January 12	Cleveland	W 99-98	Kobe Bryant (27)	Lamar Odom (10)	Lamar Odom (9)	Staples Center; 18,997	19–17
37	January 14	@ Golden State	W 110-104	Kobe Bryant (38)	Brown & Parker (12)	Kobe Bryant (7)	Oakland Arena; 20,179	20–17
38	January 16	Miami	W 100-92	Kobe Bryant (37)	Lamar Odom (10)	Lamar Odom (9)	Staples Center; 18,997	21–17
39	January 19	@ Sacramento	L 109-118 (OT)	Kobe Bryant (51)	Lamar Odom (10)	Lamar Odom (6)	ARCO Arena; 17,317	21–18
40	January 20	@ Phoenix	L 93-106	Kobe Bryant (37)	Lamar Odom (12)	Lamar Odom (4)	American West Arena; 18,422	21–19
41	January 22	Toronto	W 122-104	Kobe Bryant (81)	Brown & Odom (10)	Lamar Odom (7)	Staples Center; 18,997	22–19
42	January 27	Golden State	W 106-105 (OT)	Kobe Bryant (30)	3 players tied (9)	Kobe Bryant (8)	Staples Center; 18,997	23–19
43	January 29	@ Detroit	L 93-102	Kobe Bryant (39)	Chris Mihm (14)	3 players tied (3)	The Palace of Auburn Hills; 22,076	23–20
44	January 31	@ New York	W 130-97	Kobe Bryant (40)	Lamar Odom (13)	Smush Parker (5)	Madison Square Garden; 19,763	24–20

February: 5–8 (home: 4–3; road: 1–5)

Game	Date	Team	Score	High points	High rebounds	High assists	Location Attendance	Record
45	February 1	@ Indiana	L 79-105	Kobe Bryant (26)	Lamar Odom (7)	Luke Walton (3)	Conseco Fieldhouse; 16,127	24–21
46	February 3	@ Charlotte	L 102-112	Kobe Bryant (35)	Bryant & Mihm (9)	Bryant & Walton (5)	Charlotte Bobcats Arena; 19,026	24–22
47	February 4	@ New Orleans/Oklahoma City	L 90-106	Kobe Bryant (35)	Kwame Brown (10)	Smush Parker (6)	Ford Center; 19,344	24–23
48	February 7	@ Dallas	L 87-102	Brian Cook (28)	George & Odom (6)	Lamar Odom (7)	American Airlines Center; 20,379	24-24
49	February 8	@ Houston	W 89-78	Kobe Bryant (32)	Lamar Odom (13)	Kobe Bryant (9)	Toyota Center; 18,291	25–24
50	February 11	Memphis	L 99-100	Kobe Bryant (26)	Kwame Brown (8)	Lamar Odom (7)	Staples Center; 18,997	25-25
51	February 13	Utah	W 94-88	Kobe Bryant (23)	Lamar Odom (9)	Lamar Odom (8)	Staples Center; 18,629	26–25
52	February 15	Atlanta	L 110-114	Kobe Bryant (39)	Brian Cook (6)	Kobe Bryant (9)	Staples Center; 18,259	26-26
All-Star Break
53	February 21	Portland	W 99-82	Kobe Bryant (27)	Lamar Odom (17)	Smush Parker (9)	Staples Center; 18,241	27–26
54	February 23	Sacramento	W 106-85	Kobe Bryant (36)	Devean George (9)	Kobe Bryant (10)	Staples Center; 18,997	28–26
55	February 24	@ L.A. Clippers	L 83-102	Kobe Bryant (39)	Lamar Odom (9)	Kobe Bryant (8)	Staples Center; 19,820	28–27
56	February 26	Boston	L 111-112	Kobe Bryant (40)	Lamar Odom (10)	Lamar Odom (7)	Staples Center; 18,997	28-28
57	February 28	Orlando	W 102-87	Kobe Bryant (28)	Lamar Odom (12)	Kobe Bryant (8)	Staples Center; 18,997	29–28

March: 10–7 (home: 5–3; road: 5–4)

Game	Date	Team	Score	High points	High rebounds	High assists	Location Attendance	Record
58	March 1	@ Portland	L 93-99	Kobe Bryant (35)	Lamar Odom (8)	Kobe Bryant (5)	Rose Garden; 19,454	29-29
59	March 3	@ Golden State	W 106-94	Kobe Bryant (42)	Brown & Vujačić (8)	Kobe Bryant (5)	Oakland Arena; 20,375	30–29
60	March 4	Detroit	W 105-94	Kobe Bryant (40)	Kwame Brown (12)	Lamar Odom (10)	Staples Center; 18,997	31–29
61	March 6	San Antonio	L 96-103	Kobe Bryant (43)	Brown & Odom (7)	Smush Parker (5)	Staples Center; 18,997	31–30
62	March 8	@ New Orleans/Oklahoma City	W 113-107	Kobe Bryant (40)	Lamar Odom (17)	Smush Parker (7)	New Orleans Arena; 17,744	32–30
63	March 10	@ San Antonio	W 100-92	Kobe Bryant (29)	Luke Walton (10)	Lamar Odom (9)	SBC Center; 18,797	33–30
64	March 12	Seattle	L 113-120	Kobe Bryant (22)	Chris Mihm (13)	Kobe Bryant (7)	Staples Center; 18,997	33–31
65	March 14	@ Sacramento	L 98-114	Kobe Bryant (30)	Kwame Brown (8)	Bryant & Odom (7)	ARCO Arena; 17,317	33–32
66	March 15	Minnesota	W 92-89	Kobe Bryant (25)	Lamar Odom (12)	Lamar Odom (8)	Staples Center; 18,997	34–32
67	March 17	@ New Jersey	L 89-92	Kobe Bryant (24)	Lamar Odom (13)	Kobe Bryant (11)	Continental Airlines Arena; 20,098	34–33
68	March 19	@ Cleveland	L 95-96	Kobe Bryant (38)	Lamar Odom (8)	Lamar Odom (9)	Gund Arena; 20,562	34-34
69	March 20	@ Boston	W 105-97	Kobe Bryant (43)	Brown & Odom (9)	Brown & Parker (5)	TD Banknorth Garden; 18,624	35–34
70	March 22	Sacramento	W 87-80	Kobe Bryant (28)	Kwame Brown (12)	Lamar Odom (8)	Staples Center; 18,997	36–34
71	March 24	Milwaukee	W 101-96	Kobe Bryant (43)	Brown & Odom (9)	Smush Parker (8)	Staples Center; 18,745	37–34
72	March 26	New Orleans/Oklahoma City	W 105-94	Kobe Bryant (30)	Lamar Odom (8)	Smush Parker (8)	Staples Center; 18,997	38–34
73	March 30	San Antonio	L 85-96	Kobe Bryant (23)	Kwame Brown (10)	Smush Parker (5)	Staples Center; 18,997	38–35
74	March 31	@ Seattle	W 106-93	Kobe Bryant (43)	Kwame Brown (13)	Smush Parker (7)	KeyArena; 17,072	39–35

April: 6–2 (home: 6–0; road: 0–2)

Game	Date	Team	Score	High points	High rebounds	High assists	Location Attendance	Record
75	April 2	Houston	W 104-88	Kobe Bryant (43)	Odom & Walton (6)	Smush Parker (10)	Staples Center; 18,997	40–35
76	April 6	@ Denver	L 108-110 (OT)	Kobe Bryant (42)	Kwame Brown (13)	Luke Walton (6)	Pepsi Center; 19,629	40–36
77	April 7	@ Phoenix	L 96-107	Kobe Bryant (51)	Lamar Odom (11)	Lamar Odom (5)	American West Arena; 18,422	40–37
78	April 9	L.A. Clippers	W 100-83	Kobe Bryant (38)	Lamar Odom (15)	Bryant & Vujačić (5)	Staples Center; 18,997	41–37
79	April 11	Golden State	W 111-100	Kobe Bryant (31)	Kwame Brown (15)	Lamar Odom (10)	Staples Center; 18,997	42–37
80	April 14	Portland	W 110-99	Kobe Bryant (50)	Lamar Odom (12)	Lamar Odom (12)	Staples Center; 18,997	43–37
81	April 16	Phoenix	W 109-89	Kobe Bryant (43)	Lamar Odom (11)	Lamar Odom (7)	Staples Center; 18,997	44–37
82	April 19	New Orleans/Oklahoma City	W 115-95	Kobe Bryant (35)	Kwame Brown (8)	Lamar Odom (6)	Staples Center; 18,997	45–37

2005–06 season schedule

=== Playoffs ===
2006 playoff game log
Total: 3–4 (home: 2–1; road: 1–3)
First Round: 3–4 (home: 2–1; road: 1–3)

Game	Date	Team	Score	High points	High rebounds	High assists	Location Attendance	Series
1	April 23	@ Phoenix	L 102–107	Kobe Bryant (22)	Lamar Odom (14)	Kobe Bryant (5)	US Airways Center; 18,422	0–1
2	April 26	@ Phoenix	W 99–93	Kobe Bryant (29)	Kobe Bryant (10)	Bryant & Odom (5)	US Airways Center; 18,422	1–1
3	April 28	Phoenix	W 99–92	Smush Parker (18)	Lamar Odom (17)	Kobe Bryant (7)	Staples Center; 18,997	2–1
4	April 30	Phoenix	W 99–98 (OT)	Lamar Odom (25)	Kwame Brown (10)	Kobe Bryant (8)	Staples Center; 18,997	3–1
5	May 2	@ Phoenix	L 97–114	Kobe Bryant (29)	Lamar Odom (15)	Lamar Odom (6)	US Airways Center; 18,422	3–2
6	May 4	Phoenix	L 118–126 (OT)	Kobe Bryant (50)	Lamar Odom (11)	Lamar Odom (9)	Staples Center; 18,997	3–3
7	May 6	@ Phoenix	L 90–121	Kobe Bryant (24)	Sasha Vujačić (6)	Smush Parker (4)	US Airways Center; 18,422	3–4

2006 schedule

== Player statistics ==
Legend
GP	Games played	GS	Games started	MPG	Minutes per game
FG%	Field-goal percentage	3P%	3-point field-goal percentage	FT%	Free-throw percentage
RPG	Rebounds per game	APG	Assists per game	SPG	Steals per game
BPG	Blocks per game	PPG	Points per game

=== Regular season ===
Player	GP	GS	MPG	FG%	3P%	FT%	RPG	APG	SPG	BPG	PPG
Kwame Brown	72	49	27.5	.526	.000	.545	6.6	1.0	.4	.6	7.4
Kobe Bryant	80	80	41.0	.450	.347	.850	5.3	4.5	1.8	.4	35.4
Andrew Bynum	46	0	7.3	.402	.	.296	1.7	.2	.1	.5	1.6
Brian Cook	81	46	19.0	.511	.429	.832	3.4	.9	.5	.4	7.9
Devean George	71	5	21.7	.400	.313	.674	3.9	1.0	.9	.5	6.3
Devin Green	27	0	5.0	.214	.000	.619	.9	.3	.1	.0	.9
Jim Jackson	13	0	7.1	.290	.364	.	.9	.3	.2	.0	1.7
Aaron McKie	14	0	8.6	.250	.000	.500	1.4	.8	.4	.0	.5
Stanislav Medvedenko	2	0	3.0	.500	.	.	.000	.5	.0	.0	1.0
Chris Mihm	59	56	26.1	.501	.	.716	6.3	1.0	0.3	1.2	10.2
Lamar Odom	80	80	40.3	.481	.372	.690	9.2	5.5	.9	.8	14.8
Smush Parker	82	82	33.8	.447	.366	.694	3.3	3.7	1.7	.2	11.5
Laron Profit	25	1	11.2	.476	.167	.875	1.7	.6	.4	.2	4.2
Ronny Turiaf	23	1	7.0	.500	.	.556	1.6	.3	.1	.4	2.0
Saša Vujačić	82	4	17.7	.346	.343	.885	1.9	1.7	.6	.0	3.9
Von Wafer	16	0	4.6	.158	.118	.750	.5	.3	.2	.0	1.3
Luke Walton	69	6	19.3	.412	.327	.750	3.6	2.3	.6	.2	5.0

*Total for entire season including previous team(s)

=== Playoffs ===
Player	GP	GS	MPG	FG%	3P%	FT%	RPG	APG	SPG	BPG	PPG
Kwame Brown	7	7	32.1	.523	.	.710	6.6	1.0	.3	.9	12.9
Kobe Bryant	7	7	44.9	.497	.400	.771	6.3	5.1	1.1	.4	27.9
Andrew Bynum	1	0	2.0	.000	.	.	.0	.0	.0	.0	.0
Brian Cook	7	0	11.1	.391	.364	1.000	3.1	1.1	.1	.0	6.3
Devean George	7	0	17.3	.382	.429	.400	2.3	.6	.6	.1	5.3
Jim Jackson	3	0	7.0	.333	.000	.	1.0	.7	.3	.3	1.3
Aaron McKie	1	0	8.0	.	.	.	.0	.0	.0	.0	.0
Lamar Odom	7	7	44.9	.495	.200	.667	11.0	4.9	.4	1.1	19.1
Smush Parker	7	7	36.9	.333	.154	1.000	3.0	1.6	2.1	.1	8.9
Ronny Turiaf	3	0	8.3	.600	.	.600	2.3	.0	.0	.3	3.7
Saša Vujačić	7	0	18.4	.423	.600	1.000	2.4	.9	.6	.0	6.0
Luke Walton	7	7	33.6	.458	.364	1.000	6.4	1.7	1.0	.1	12.1

== Awards and records ==
- Kobe Bryant, All-NBA First Team
- Kobe Bryant, NBA All-Defensive First Team

== Transactions ==
- On June 14, 2005, the Lakers re-hired former head coach Phil Jackson.
- On August 2, 2005, the Lakers traded guard/forward Caron Butler and guard Chucky Atkins to the Washington Wizards in exchange for forward Kwame Brown and guard Laron Profit.
- The Lakers traded guard Kareem Rush to the Charlotte Bobcats for two future second round draft picks.
- On October 26, 2005, The Lakers traded Jumaine Jones to the Charlotte Bobcats in exchange for a 2007 2nd round pick (Sun Yue).
- Laron Profit was waived on January 16, 2006.
- On March 6, 2006, Jim Jackson was signed as a free agent.
