= 2005–06 Phoenix Suns season =

NBA team season

- Division champions
- Head coach: Mike D'Antoni
- General manager: Bryan Colangelo, Mike D'Antoni
- Owners: Robert Sarver
- Arena: America West Arena, US Airways Center

Results
- Record: 54–28 (.659)
- Place: Division: 1st (Pacific); Conference: 2nd (Western)
- Playoff finish: Western Conference Finals (lost to Mavericks 2–4)

Local media
- Television: KUTP; FSN Arizona
- Radio: KTAR

The 2005–06 Phoenix Suns season was the 38th season of the franchise in the National Basketball Association (NBA). The Suns were led by head coach Mike D'Antoni, posting a 54–28 record, second best in the Western Conference and third best in the league. All home games were played at the former America West Arena, which changed its name to US Airways Center in January 2006.

The Suns looked to improve on their league-best 62–20 record and a trip to the Western Conference finals in the 2004–05 season. The Suns suffered a major setback before the season, when All-Star Amar'e Stoudemire underwent microfracture surgery on his left knee. Stoudemire returned for three games, before undergoing another surgery on his right knee. The team was led by defending MVP Steve Nash and All-Star Shawn Marion. Marion led the team in points (21.8), rebounds (11.8), steals (2.0) and blocks (1.7) per game. Nash led the league in assists with 10.5 a game, while posting a career- high 18.8 points a game, earning his second consecutive MVP award.

With injuries to Stoudemire and backup forward-center Kurt Thomas, the Suns looked to second-year forward Boris Diaw to fill in the middle. Listed in the Suns' media guide as a guard before the season, the 6-foot 8-inch Diaw started at small forward, power forward and center throughout the season, posting 13 points, 7 rebounds, 6 assists and a block a game, earning Most Improved Player honors.

In the first round of the playoffs, the Suns fell into a 1–3 hole against their longtime rivals, the Los Angeles Lakers. They became, at the time, the eighth team in NBA history to recover from a 3–1 deficit, winning the final three games of the series to advance to the semifinals. In the semifinals, they defeated the Lakers' Staples Center co-tenants, the Los Angeles Clippers, in another seven-game series. The Suns fell in the conference finals to the Dallas Mavericks in six games.

== Offseason ==
=== NBA draft ===
Round	Pick	Player	Position	Nationality	College / Club
1	21	Nate Robinson	Guard	United States	Washington
2	57	Marcin Gortat	Center	Poland	(Germany) RheinEnergie Köln

== Roster ==
2005–06 Phoenix Suns roster
Players

Pos.	No.	Player	Height	Weight	DOB	From
G	10	Leandro Barbosa	6 ft 3 in (1.91 m)	176 lb (80 kg)	1982-11-28	Brazil
G/F	19	Raja Bell	6 ft 5 in (1.96 m)	204 lb (93 kg)	1976-09-19	FIU
C	11	Pat Burke	6 ft 11 in (2.11 m)	250 lb (113 kg)	1973-12-14	Auburn
F/C	3	Boris Diaw	6 ft 8 in (2.03 m)	215 lb (98 kg)	1982-04-16	France
F/C	55	Brian Grant	6 ft 9 in (2.06 m)	254 lb (115 kg)	1972-03-05	Xavier
G	50	Eddie House	6 ft 1 in (1.85 m)	180 lb (82 kg)	1978-05-14	Arizona State
SF	22	James Jones	6 ft 8 in (2.03 m)	225 lb (102 kg)	1980-10-04	Miami (FL)
F	31	Shawn Marion	6 ft 7 in (2.01 m)	220 lb (100 kg)	1978-05-07	UNLV
PG	13	Steve Nash	6 ft 3 in (1.91 m)	195 lb (88 kg)	1974-02-07	Santa Clara
F/C	32	Amar'e Stoudemire	6 ft 10 in (2.08 m)	245 lb (111 kg)	1982-11-16	Cypress Creek HS (FL)
F/C	40	Kurt Thomas	6 ft 9 in (2.06 m)	230 lb (104 kg)	1972-10-04	TCU
F/C	2	Tim Thomas	6 ft 10 in (2.08 m)	230 lb (104 kg)	1977-02-26	Villanova
G/F	1	Dijon Thompson	6 ft 7 in (2.01 m)	195 lb (88 kg)	1982-02-23	UCLA
F	15	Nikoloz Tskitishvili	7 ft 0 in (2.13 m)	225 lb (102 kg)	1983-04-14	Georgia

Coaches
Head coach
- (United States) Mike D'Antoni (Marshall)
Assistant(s)
- (United States) Dan D'Antoni (Marshall)
- (United States) Alvin Gentry (Appalachian State)
- (United States) Marc Iavaroni (Virginia)
- (United States) Todd Quinter (Lebanon Valley)
- (United States) Phil Weber (NC State)

Legend
- (DP) Unsigned draft pick
- (FA) Free agent
- (S) Suspended
- Injured

== Regular season ==
=== Standings ===
Pacific Division	W	L	PCT	GB	Home	Road	Div
y-Phoenix Suns	54	28	.659	-	31–10	23–18	10–6
x-Los Angeles Clippers	47	35	.573	7	27–14	20–21	7–9
x-Los Angeles Lakers	45	37	.549	9	27–14	18–23	9–7
x-Sacramento Kings	44	38	.537	10	27–14	17–24	10–6
Golden State Warriors	34	48	.415	20	21–20	13–28	4–12

#	Western Conference				
#	Team	W	L	PCT	GB
1	c-San Antonio Spurs	63	19	.768	-
2	y-Phoenix Suns	54	28	.659	9
3	y-Denver Nuggets	44	38	.537	19
4	x-Dallas Mavericks	60	22	.732	3
5	x-Memphis Grizzlies	49	33	.598	14
6	x-Los Angeles Clippers	47	35	.573	16
7	x-Los Angeles Lakers	45	37	.549	18
8	x-Sacramento Kings	44	38	.537	19
9	Utah Jazz	41	41	.500	22
10	New Orleans/Oklahoma City Hornets	38	44	.463	25
11	Seattle SuperSonics	35	47	.427	28
12	Golden State Warriors	34	48	.415	29
13	Houston Rockets	34	48	.415	29
14	Minnesota Timberwolves	33	49	.402	30
15	Portland Trail Blazers	21	61	.256	42

== Playoffs ==
=== Game log ===
2006 playoff game log
First Round: 4–3 (home: 3–1; road: 1–2)

Game	Date	Team	Score	High points	High rebounds	High assists	Location Attendance	Series
1	April 23	L.A. Lakers	W 107–102	Tim Thomas (22)	Tim Thomas (15)	Steve Nash (10)	US Airways Center; 18,422	1–0
2	April 26	L.A. Lakers	L 93–99	Steve Nash (29)	Marion, Thomas (9)	Steve Nash (9)	US Airways Center; 18,422	1–1
3	April 28	@ L.A. Lakers	L 92–99	Shawn Marion (20)	Marion, Nash (7)	Steve Nash (11)	Staples Center; 18,997	1–2
4	April 30	@ L.A. Lakers	L 98–99 (OT)	Steve Nash (22)	Shawn Marion (12)	Steve Nash (11)	Staples Center; 18,997	1–3
5	May 2	L.A. Lakers	W 114–97	Boris Diaw (25)	Boris Diaw (10)	Boris Diaw (9)	US Airways Center; 18,422	2–3
6	May 4	@ L.A. Lakers	W 126–118 (OT)	Steve Nash (32)	Shawn Marion (12)	Steve Nash (13)	Staples Center; 18,997	3–3
7	May 6	L.A. Lakers	W 121–90	Leandro Barbosa (26)	Shawn Marion (10)	Diaw, Nash (9)	US Airways Center; 18,422	4–3

Conference Semifinals: 4–3 (home: 3–1; road: 1–2)

Game	Date	Team	Score	High points	High rebounds	High assists	Location Attendance	Series
1	May 8	L.A. Clippers	W 130–123	Steve Nash (31)	Shawn Marion (15)	Steve Nash (12)	US Airways Center; 18,422	1–0
2	May 10	L.A. Clippers	L 97–122	Raja Bell (20)	Shawn Marion (6)	Steve Nash (8)	US Airways Center; 18,422	1–1
3	May 12	@ L.A. Clippers	W 94–91	Shawn Marion (32)	Shawn Marion (19)	Steve Nash (10)	Staples Center; 19,877	2–1
4	May 14	@ L.A. Clippers	L 107–114	Raja Bell (33)	Shawn Marion (10)	Steve Nash (11)	Staples Center; 19,897	2–2
5	May 16	L.A. Clippers	W 125–118 (2OT)	Shawn Marion (36)	Shawn Marion (20)	Steve Nash (13)	US Airways Center; 18,422	3–2
6	May 18	@ L.A. Clippers	L 106–118	Shawn Marion (34)	Diaw, Marion (9)	Steve Nash (11)	Staples Center; 19,985	3–3
7	May 22	L.A. Clippers	W 127–107	Shawn Marion (30)	Shawn Marion (9)	Steve Nash (11)	US Airways Center; 18,422	4–3

Conference Finals: 2–4 (home: 1–2; road: 1–2)

Game	Date	Team	Score	High points	High rebounds	High assists	Location Attendance	Series
1	May 24	@ Dallas	W 121–118	Boris Diaw (34)	Shawn Marion (13)	Steve Nash (16)	American Airlines Center; 20,789	1–0
2	May 26	@ Dallas	L 98–105	Boris Diaw (25)	Shawn Marion (19)	Steve Nash (11)	American Airlines Center; 20,934	1–1
3	May 28	Dallas	L 88–95	Steve Nash (21)	Shawn Marion (18)	Steve Nash (7)	US Airways Center; 18,422	1–2
4	May 30	Dallas	W 106–86	Leandro Barbosa (24)	Boris Diaw (9)	Steve Nash (7)	US Airways Center; 18,422	2–2
5	June 1	@ Dallas	L 101–117	Tim Thomas (26)	Shawn Marion (10)	Steve Nash (11)	American Airlines Center; 20,977	2–3
6	June 3	Dallas	L 93–102	Boris Diaw (30)	Diaw, Marion (11)	Steve Nash (9)	US Airways Center; 18,422	2–4

2006 schedule

== Awards and honors ==
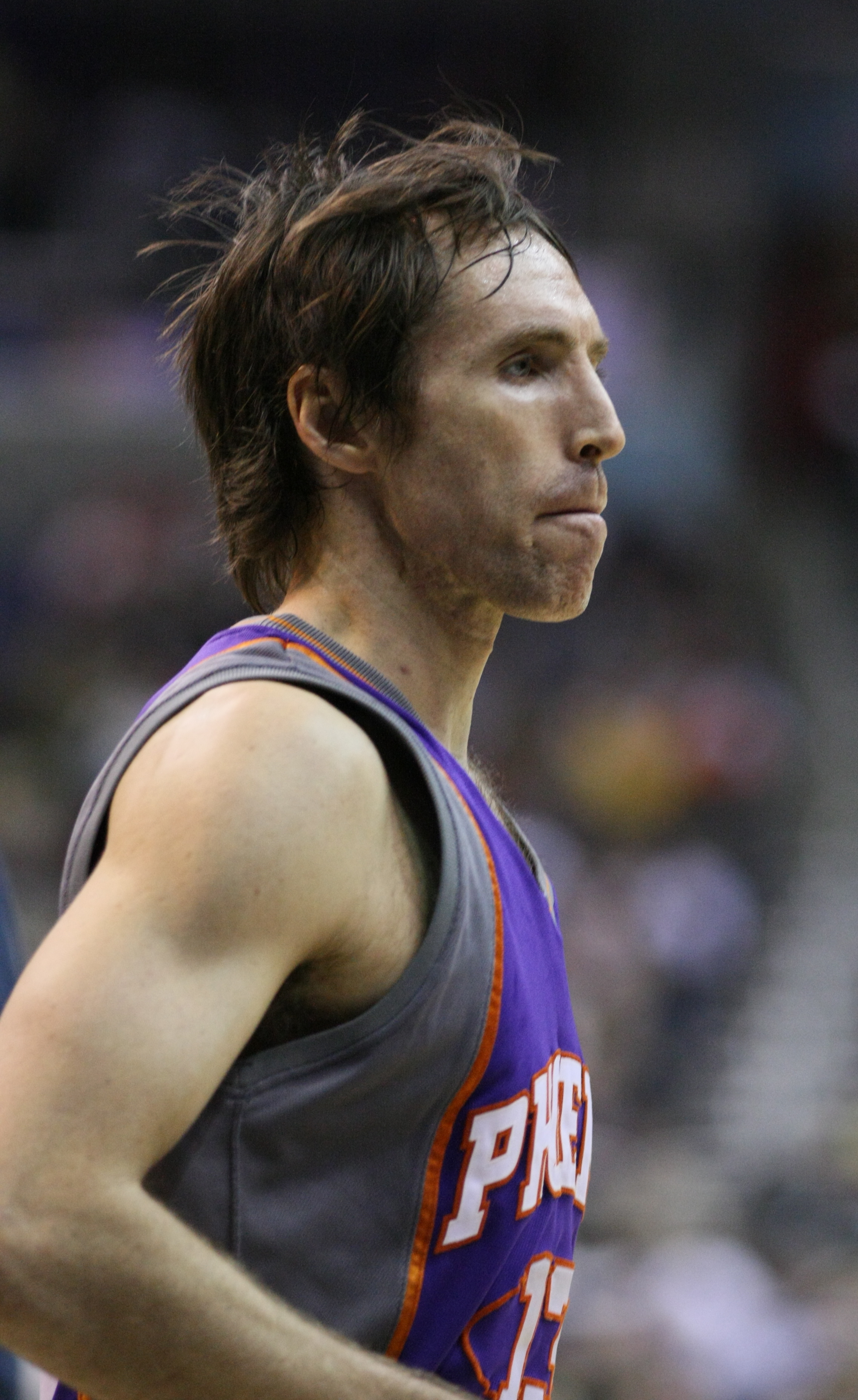
Steve Nash

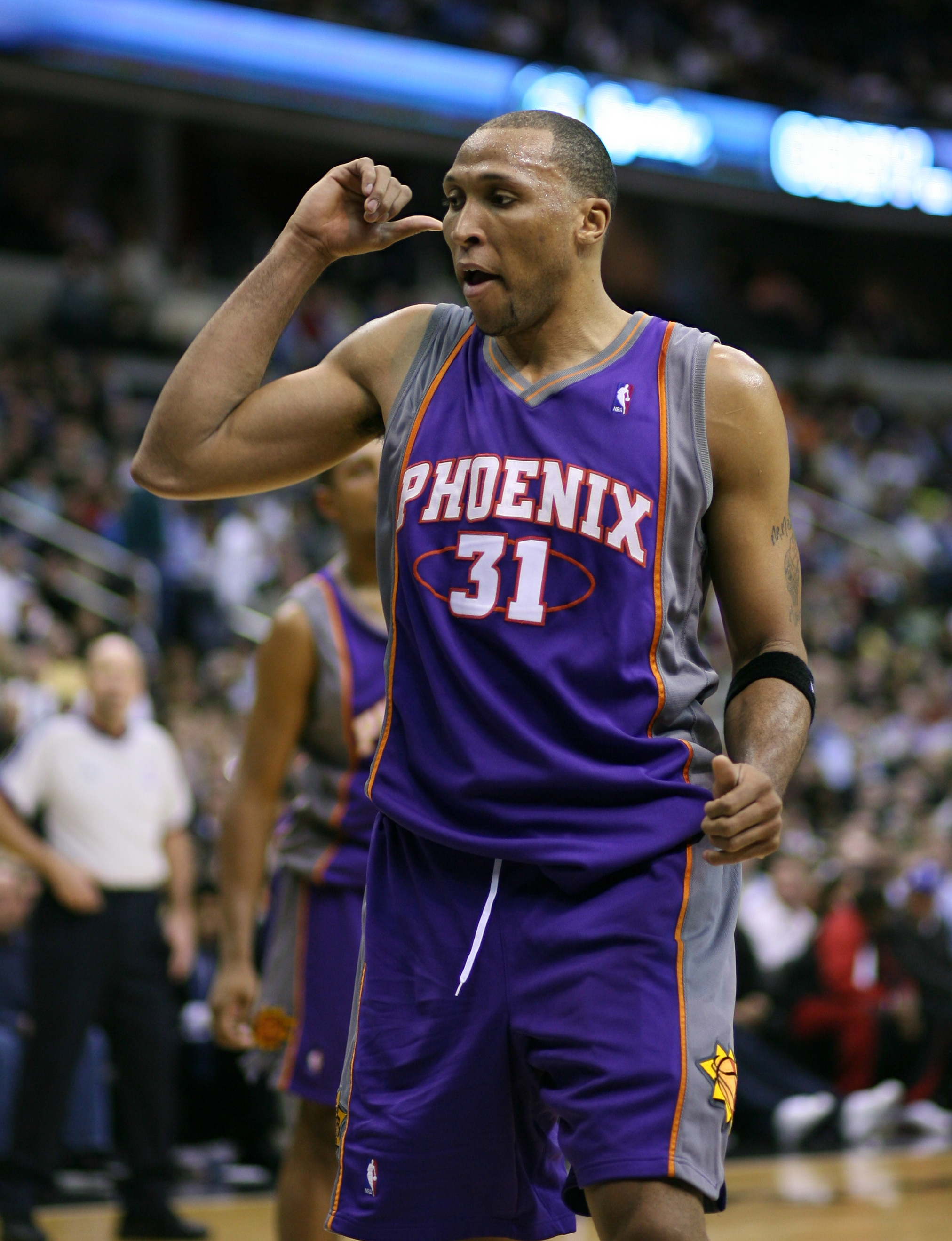
Shawn Marion

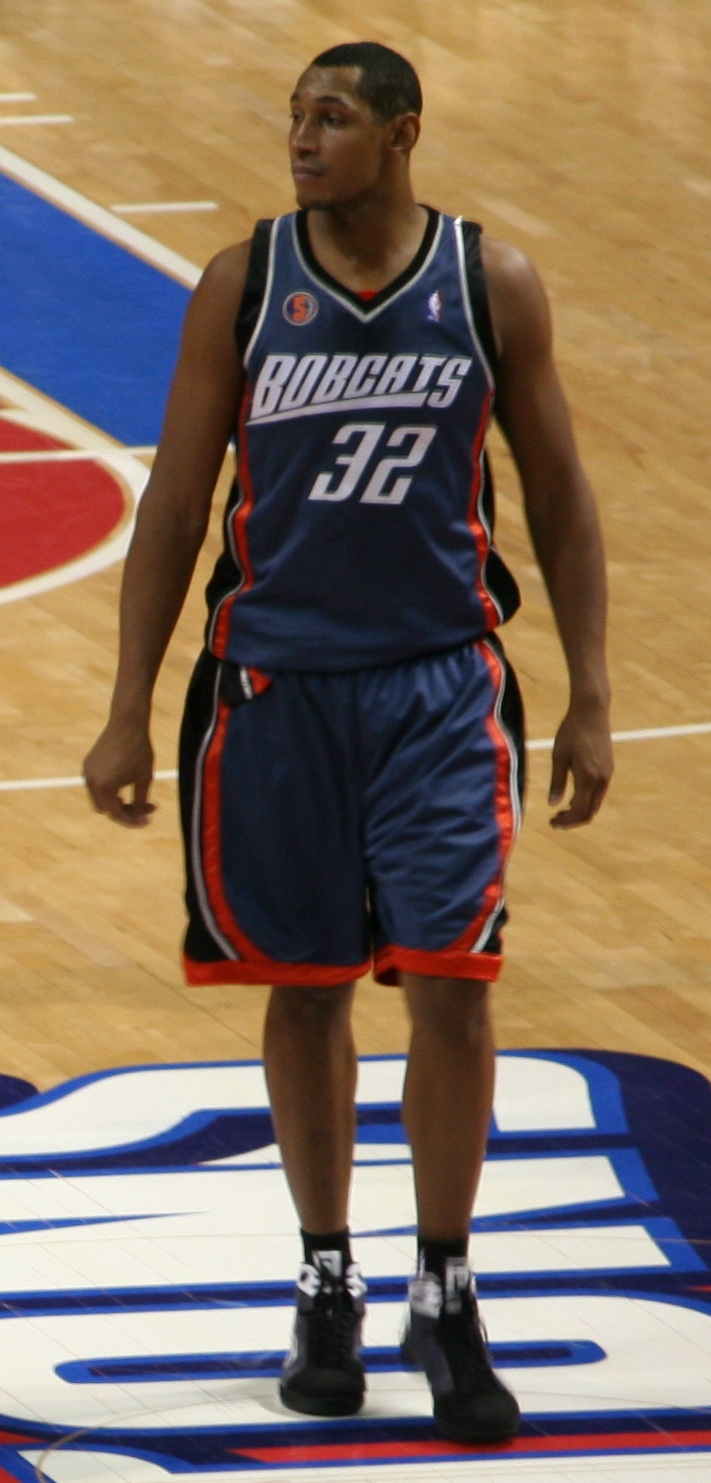
Boris Diaw

=== Week/Month ===
- Shawn Marion was named Western Conference Player of the Month for February.
- Steve Nash was named Western Conference Player of the Week for games played November 21 through November 27.
- Shawn Marion was named Western Conference Player of the Week for games played December 26 through January 1.
- Steve Nash was named Western Conference Player of the Week for games played January 2 through January 8.

=== All-Star ===
- Steve Nash was voted as a starter for the Western Conference in the All-Star Game. It was his fourth All-Star selection. Nash finished second in voting among Western Conference guards with 1,818,230 votes.
- Shawn Marion was selected as a reserve for the Western Conference in the All-Star Game. It was his third All-Star selection. Marion finished ninth in voting among Western Conference forwards with 285,505 votes.
- Raja Bell was selected to compete in the Three-Point Shootout. Bell did not participate due to personal issues and was replaced by Gilbert Arenas.
- Steve Nash was selected to compete in the Skills Challenge. Nash lost the competition to Dwyane Wade.
- Team Phoenix, consisting of Shawn Marion, Kelly Miller and Dan Majerle, competed in the Shooting Stars Competition, losing to Team San Antonio.

=== Season ===
- Steve Nash received the Most Valuable Player Award.
- Boris Diaw received the Most Improved Player Award.
- Steve Nash was named to the All-NBA First Team.
- Shawn Marion was named to the All-NBA Third Team. Marion also finished seventh in Defensive Player of the Year voting.
- Steve Nash led the league in assists per game with a 10.5 average, and total assists with 826.
- Steve Nash led the league in free throw percentage, making 92.1% of his attempts.
- Raja Bell finished 13th in Defensive Player of the Year voting, and 23rd in Most Improved Player voting.
- Leandro Barbosa finished seventh in Sixth Man of the Year voting.
- Eddie House finished 13th in Sixth Man of the Year voting.

== Player statistics ==
Legend
GP	Games played	GS	Games started	MPG	Minutes per game
FG%	Field-goal percentage	3P%	3-point field-goal percentage	FT%	Free-throw percentage
RPG	Rebounds per game	APG	Assists per game	SPG	Steals per game
BPG	Blocks per game	PPG	Points per game

=== Season ===
Player	GP	GS	MPG	FG%	3P%	FT%	RPG	APG	SPG	BPG	PPG
Leandro Barbosa	57	11	27.9	.481	.444	.755	2.6	2.8	.8	.1	13.1
Andre Barrett*	2	0	10.5	.429	.000	1.000^	1.5	1.0	.0	.0	4.5
Raja Bell	79	79	37.5	.457	.442	.788	3.2	2.6	1.0	.3	14.7
Pat Burke	42	0	8.2	.496	.286	.619	1.7	0.4	.1	.3	3.4
Josh Davis*	1	0	5.0	.333	.000	.667	1.0	0.0	1.0	.0	4.0
Boris Diaw	81	70	35.5	.526†	.267	.731	6.9	6.2	.7	1.0	13.3
Sharrod Ford	3	0	4.3	.667†	.	.	1.0	0.0	.0	.3	1.3
Brian Grant	21	2	11.8	.415	.	.875	2.7	0.3	.2	.1	2.9
Eddie House	81	0	17.5	.422	.389	.805	1.6	1.8	.5	.1	9.8
Jim Jackson*	27	1	15.6	.295	.222	.692	2.4	1.1	.4	.2	3.7
James Jones	75	24	23.6	.418	.386	.851	3.4	0.8	.5	.7	9.3
Shawn Marion	81	81	40.3	.525	.331	.809	11.8	1.8	2.0	1.7	21.8
Steve Nash	79	79	35.4	.512	.439	.921^	4.2	10.5	.8	.2	18.8
Amar'e Stoudemire	3	3	16.7	.333	.000	.889	5.3	0.7	.3	1.0	8.7
Kurt Thomas	53	50	26.6	.486	.	.815	7.8	1.1	.4	1.0	8.6
Tim Thomas*	26	10	24.4	.435	.429	.667	4.9	0.7	.6	.2	11.0
Dijon Thompson	10	0	4.3	.440	.364	1.000^	1.1	0.1	.3	.1	2.8
Nikoloz Tskitishvili*	12	0	7.2	.364	.333	.667	1.7	0.3	.1	.2	2.8

* – Stats with the Suns.
† – Minimum 300 field goals made.
^ – Minimum 125 free throws made.

=== Playoffs ===
Player	GP	GS	MPG	FG%	3P%	FT%	RPG	APG	SPG	BPG	PPG
Leandro Barbosa	20	3	31.6	.470	.391	.862	1.6	2.7	.8	.2	14.2
Raja Bell	17	17	39.6	.479	.465^	.829	2.8	2.2	.6	.2	13.6
Pat Burke	3	0	2.3	.500	.500^	.000	1.0	0.0	.0	.3	1.7
Boris Diaw	20	20	39.8	.526	.429	.761	6.7	5.2	.9	1.1	18.7
Brian Grant	5	0	2.4	.333	.	.000	0.4	0.0	.0	.0	0.4
Eddie House	14	0	9.3	.365	.214	.750	0.6	0.4	.1	.1	3.1
James Jones	20	6	17.7	.341	.308	.846	3.6	0.3	.3	.9	4.3
Shawn Marion	20	20	42.5	.489	.314	.881	11.7	1.6	1.9	1.2	20.4
Steve Nash	20	20	39.9	.502	.368	.912	3.7	10.2	.4	.3	20.4
Kurt Thomas	1	0	6.0	.	.	.500	1.0	0.0	.0	.0	1.0
Tim Thomas	20	14	31.8	.491	.444	.776	6.3	1.3	.9	.4	15.1
Nikoloz Tskitishvili	4	0	2.0	.000	.000	.500	0.3	0.5	.0	.0	0.3

^ – Minimum 5 three-pointers made.
