= Sir Separanlu-ye Olya =

Village in North Khorasan province, Iran

Sir Separanlu-ye Olya Persian: سير سپرانلو عليا
- Village
- Location within Iran
- Coordinates: 37°42′00″N 58°00′47″E
- Country: Iran
- Province: North Khorasan
- County: Shirvan
- District: Sarhad
- Rural District: Jirestan

Population (2016)
  - Total: 318
- Time zone: UTC+3:30 (IRST)

Sir Separanlu-ye Olya (Persian: سير سپرانلو عليا) (Note: Also romanized as Sīr Separānlū-ye ‘Olyā and Sīrseprānlū-ye ‘Olyā; also known as Sīr Separānlū Bālā, Sīrseparānlū-ye Bālā, and Sīsparānlū-ye Bālā) is a village in Jirestan Rural District of Sarhad District in Shirvan County, North Khorasan province, Iran.

== Demographics ==
=== Population ===
At the time of the 2006 National Census, the village's population was 196 in 37 households. The following census in 2011 counted 199 people in 53 households. The 2016 census measured the population of the village as 318 people in 89 households.
