= Kalateh-ye Nazar Mohammad =

Village in North Khorasan province, Iran

Kalateh-ye Nazar Mohammad Persian: كلاته نظرمحمد
- Village
- Location within Iran
- Coordinates: 37°42′56″N 57°53′59″E
- Country: Iran
- Province: North Khorasan
- County: Shirvan
- District: Sarhad
- Rural District: Jirestan

Population (2016)
  - Total: 699
- Time zone: UTC+3:30 (IRST)

Kalateh-ye Nazar Mohammad (Persian: كلاته نظرمحمد) (Note: Also romanized as Kalāteh-ye Naz̧ar Moḩammad; also known as Naz̧ar Moḩammad) is a village in Jirestan Rural District of Sarhad District in Shirvan County, North Khorasan province, Iran.

== Demographics ==
=== Population ===
At the time of the 2006 National Census, the village's population was 714 in 144 households. The following census in 2011 counted 735 people in 174 households. The 2016 census measured the population of the village as 699 people in 181 households.
