= Jirestan Rural District =

Rural district in North Khorasan province, Iran

Jirestan Rural District Persian: دهستان جيرستان
- Rural District
- Location within Iran
- Coordinates: 37°43′N 58°01′E
- Country: Iran
- Province: North Khorasan
- County: Shirvan
- District: Sarhad
- Established: 1987
- Capital: Kuseh

Population (2016)
  - Total: 5,604
- Time zone: UTC+3:30 (IRST)

Jirestan Rural District (Persian: دهستان جيرستان) is in Sarhad District of Shirvan County, North Khorasan province, Iran. Its capital is the village of Kuseh.

== Demographics ==
=== Population ===
At the time of the 2006 National Census, the rural district's population was 5,841 in 1,297 households. There were 5,166 inhabitants in 1,402 households at the following census of 2011. The 2016 census measured the population of the rural district as 5,604 in 1,620 households. The most populous of its 18 villages was Namanlu, with 707 people.

=== Other villages in the rural district ===
- Alkhas
- Kalateh-ye Nazar Ali
- Kalateh-ye Nazar Mohammad
- Malvanlu
- Milanlu-ye Olya
- Sir Separanlu-ye Olya
