= 2005–06 NBA season =

60th NBA season

- League: National Basketball Association
- Sport: Basketball
- Duration: November 1, 2005 – April 19, 2006; April 22 – June 3, 2006 (Playoffs); June 8 – 20, 2006 (Finals)
- Games: 82
- Teams: 30
- TV partner(s): ABC, TNT, ESPN, NBA TV

Draft
- Top draft pick: Andrew Bogut
- Picked by: Milwaukee Bucks

Regular season
- Top seed: Detroit Pistons
- Season MVP: Steve Nash (Phoenix)
- Top scorer: Kobe Bryant (L.A. Lakers)

Playoffs
- Eastern champions: Miami Heat
- Eastern runners-up: Detroit Pistons
- Western champions: Dallas Mavericks
- Western runners-up: Phoenix Suns

Finals
- Champions: Miami Heat
- Runners-up: Dallas Mavericks
- Finals MVP: Dwyane Wade (Miami)

NBA seasons
- ← 2004–05 2006–07 →

The 2005–06 NBA season was the 60th season of the National Basketball Association (NBA). The Miami Heat defeated the Dallas Mavericks in the NBA Finals, four games to two, to win their first NBA championship.

This marked the final regular season to be held in November and the following season it would start in October. As of May 2026, LeBron James is the only remaining active player who entered the NBA before this season.

== Notable occurrences ==
- A new league dress code was put into effect at the beginning of the year by commissioner David Stern.
- The Miami Heat win their first NBA championship in franchise history. They become the third franchise (joining the 1969 Boston Celtics and 1977 Portland Trail Blazers, later joined by the 2016 Cleveland Cavaliers and 2021 Milwaukee Bucks) to win the NBA Finals after losing the first two games.
- The All-Star Game was played on February 19, 2006, at the Toyota Center in Houston with the East beating the West 122–120. LeBron James of the Cleveland Cavaliers won the game's MVP honors the youngest ever in All-Star Game history at 21 years, and 51 days old.
- This season marked the first season for the Charlotte Bobcats in their new arena in downtown Charlotte.
- Due to the damages caused by Hurricane Katrina, the New Orleans Hornets played 36 regular season games in the Ford Center in Oklahoma City, 1 game in the Lloyd Noble Center in Norman, Oklahoma, 1 game at LSU's Pete Maravich Assembly Center, and just 3 games at the New Orleans Arena in New Orleans in March. Due to the split, the team was officially referred to as the New Orleans/Oklahoma City Hornets.
- This season marked the first under the NBA's new Collective Bargaining Agreement, agreed upon by the owners and the player union on June 21.
- The season was marked by the 30th anniversary of the absorption of four American Basketball Association members into the league: The Indiana Pacers, the New Jersey Nets, the Denver Nuggets and the San Antonio Spurs all joined in 1976.
- On January 22, 2006, Los Angeles Lakers guard Kobe Bryant scored 81 points in a game against the Toronto Raptors. This was the second-highest single game scoring total in league history, second only to Wilt Chamberlain's 100-point game in 1962.
- Scottie Pippen (Bulls), Karl Malone (Jazz), and Reggie Miller (Pacers) had their numbers retired by their respective franchises.
- The NBA held the Hardwood Classics program for the fifth straight season. The Bulls, Rockets, Clippers, Grizzlies, Heat, Nets, Knicks, Magic, Suns, Sonics, and Wizards all took part by wearing throwback jerseys for select games.
- On the last day of the regular season, Ray Allen broke the single season record for most three-pointers, at 269.
- The NBA Finals was jokingly referred to as the "American Airlines" series since both competing teams played in an arena sponsored by the same airline. The Miami Heat play their games at American Airlines Arena (now as Kaseya Center), while the Dallas Mavericks reside in the American Airlines Center.
- All five teams in the Central Division made the playoffs, marking the first time all teams in a division made the playoffs since the entire Midwest Division made it 20 years before.
- The Los Angeles Clippers made it back to the playoffs for the first time since 1997 and won their first playoff series since 1976 when they were still known as the Buffalo Braves.
- The Los Angeles Lakers and Minnesota Timberwolves sport a patch in their warmups in memory of Hall of Fame player George Mikan, who died June 1, 2005, at the age of 80.
- On June 20, 2006, the Miami Heat clinched the NBA Finals, with Wade being the Finals MVP, averaging the third highest points per game in finals history, at 34.7, the highest points per a four-game stretch in finals history, at 39.3, and the highest PER in finals history, at 33.8.
- This marks the last season that Reebok as the official outfitter for the league until they merged with Adidas the following the season and would continue for the next ten years before Nike became the official outfitter in 2017.
- This also marks the last season for longtime Boston Celtics legend Red Auerbach's official involvement as their longtime executive before he died in October 2006.

=== Coaching changes ===
Offseason
Team	2004–05 coach	2005–06 coach
Cleveland Cavaliers	Brendan Malone	Mike Brown
Detroit Pistons	Larry Brown	Flip Saunders
Los Angeles Lakers	Frank Hamblen	Phil Jackson
Milwaukee Bucks	Terry Porter	Terry Stotts
Minnesota Timberwolves	Kevin McHale	Dwane Casey
New York Knicks	Herb Williams	Larry Brown
Orlando Magic	Chris Jent	Brian Hill
Philadelphia 76ers	Jim O'Brien	Maurice Cheeks
Portland Trail Blazers	Kevin Pritchard	Nate McMillan
Seattle SuperSonics	Nate McMillan	Bob Weiss
In-season
Team	Outgoing coach	Incoming coach
Miami Heat	Stan Van Gundy	Pat Riley
Seattle SuperSonics	Bob Weiss	Bob Hill

== 2005–06 NBA changes ==
- Boston Celtics – added new green and black road alternate uniforms with black side panels to their jerseys and shorts, and they also added another new green and gold road alternate uniforms with gold side panels to their jerseys and shorts for Saint Patrick's day games only.
- Charlotte Bobcats – moved into their new arena the Charlotte Bobcats Arena, (now as Spectrum Center).
- Cleveland Cavaliers – added new dark blue road alternate uniforms added side panels to their jerseys and shorts.
- Denver Nuggets – added new dark blue road alternate uniforms with light blue side panels to their jerseys and shorts.
- Detroit Pistons – added new logo and new uniforms, added new red road alternate uniforms with blue side panels to their jerseys and shorts.
- Indiana Pacers – added new logo and new uniforms, remained with dark navy blue and gold to their color scheme and pinstripes was used during the preseason games was eventually removed to their jerseys and shorts at the start of the season.
- New Orleans/Oklahoma City Hornets – relocation from New Orleans, Louisiana to Oklahoma City, Oklahoma due to temporary move to Oklahoma City in the aftermath of the destruction of Hurricane Katrina added new logo and uniforms and split home games in New Orleans and Oklahoma City during the season.
- Portland Trail Blazers – changed their road uniforms, replacing the "Blazers" wordmark with the hometown "Portland" wordmark.
- Sacramento Kings – added new gold road alternate uniforms with purple, grey and silver side panels to their jerseys and shorts.

== Final standings ==
=== By division ===
Eastern Conference

Atlantic Division	W	L	PCT	GB	Home	Road	Div
y-New Jersey Nets	49	33	.598	-	29–12	20–21	10–6
Philadelphia 76ers	38	44	.463	11	23–18	15–26	10–6
Boston Celtics	33	49	.402	16	21–20	12–29	10–6
Toronto Raptors	27	55	.329	22	15–26	12–29	6–10
New York Knicks	23	59	.280	26	15–26	8–33	4–12

Central Division	W	L	PCT	GB	Home	Road	Div
y-Detroit Pistons	64	18	.780	-	37–4	27–14	13–3
x-Cleveland Cavaliers	50	32	.610	14	31–10	19–22	11–5
x-Indiana Pacers	41	41	.500	23	27–14	14–27	6–10
x-Chicago Bulls	41	41	.500	23	21–20	20–21	4–12
x-Milwaukee Bucks	40	42	.488	24	25–16	15–26	6–10

Southeast Division	W	L	PCT	GB	Home	Road	Div
y-Miami Heat	52	30	.634	-	31–10	21–20	13–3
x-Washington Wizards	42	40	.512	10	27–14	15–26	8–8
Orlando Magic	36	46	.439	16	26–15	10–31	9–7
Charlotte Bobcats	26	56	.317	26	17–24	9–32	5–11
Atlanta Hawks	26	56	.317	26	18–23	8–33	5–11

Western Conference

Northwest Division	W	L	PCT	GB	Home	Road	Div
y-Denver Nuggets	44	38	.537	-	26–15	18–23	10–6
Utah Jazz	41	41	.500	3	22–19	19–22	11–5
Seattle SuperSonics	35	47	.427	9	22–19	13–28	10–6
Minnesota Timberwolves	33	49	.402	11	24–17	9–32	6–10
Portland Trail Blazers	21	61	.256	23	15–26	6–35	3–13

Pacific Division	W	L	PCT	GB	Home	Road	Div
y-Phoenix Suns	54	28	.659	-	31–10	23–18	10–6
x-Los Angeles Clippers	47	35	.573	7	27–14	20–21	7–9
x-Los Angeles Lakers	45	37	.549	9	27–14	18–23	9–7
x-Sacramento Kings	44	38	.537	10	27–14	17–24	10–6
Golden State Warriors	34	48	.415	20	21–20	13–28	4–12

Southwest Division	W	L	PCT	GB	Home	Road	Div
y-San Antonio Spurs	63	19	.768	-	34–7	29–12	13–3
x-Dallas Mavericks	60	22	.732	3	34–7	26–15	13–3
x-Memphis Grizzlies	49	33	.598	14	30–11	19–22	6–10
New Orleans/Oklahoma City Hornets	38	44	.463	25	24–17	14–27	7–9
Houston Rockets	34	48	.415	29	15–26	19–22	1–15

=== By conference ===
Eastern Conference
#	Team	W	L	PCT	GB
1	z-Detroit Pistons	64	18	.780	-
2	y-Miami Heat	52	30	.634	12
3	y-New Jersey Nets	49	33	.598	15
4	x-Cleveland Cavaliers	50	32	.610	14
5	x-Washington Wizards	42	40	.512	22
6	x-Indiana Pacers	41	41	.500	23
7	x-Chicago Bulls	41	41	.500	23
8	x-Milwaukee Bucks	40	42	.488	24
9	Philadelphia 76ers	38	44	.463	26
10	Orlando Magic	36	46	.439	28
11	Boston Celtics	33	49	.402	31
12	Toronto Raptors	27	55	.329	37
13	Charlotte Bobcats	26	56	.317	38
14	Atlanta Hawks	26	56	.317	38
15	New York Knicks	23	59	.280	41

#	Western Conference				
#	Team	W	L	PCT	GB
1	c-San Antonio Spurs	63	19	.768	-
2	y-Phoenix Suns	54	28	.659	9
3	y-Denver Nuggets	44	38	.537	19
4	x-Dallas Mavericks	60	22	.732	3
5	x-Memphis Grizzlies	49	33	.598	14
6	x-Los Angeles Clippers	47	35	.573	16
7	x-Los Angeles Lakers	45	37	.549	18
8	x-Sacramento Kings	44	38	.537	19
9	Utah Jazz	41	41	.500	22
10	New Orleans/Oklahoma City Hornets	38	44	.463	25
11	Seattle SuperSonics	35	47	.427	28
12	Golden State Warriors	34	48	.415	29
13	Houston Rockets	34	48	.415	29
14	Minnesota Timberwolves	33	49	.402	30
15	Portland Trail Blazers	21	61	.256	42

Notes

- z – Clinched home court advantage for the entire playoffs
- c – Clinched home court advantage for the conference playoffs
- x – Clinched playoff spot
- y – Clinched division title

== Playoffs ==
Teams in bold advanced to the next round. The numbers to the left of each team indicate the team's seeding in its conference, and the numbers to the right indicate the number of games the team won in that round. The division champions are marked by an asterisk. Home court advantage does not necessarily belong to the higher-seeded team, but instead the team with the better regular season record; teams enjoying the home advantage are shown in italics.

First Round	Conference semifinals
**E1**	**Detroit***	**4**
E8	Milwaukee	1
**E1**	**Detroit***	**4**
E4	Cleveland	3
**E4**	**Cleveland**	**4**
E5	Washington	2
**Eastern Conference**
**E3**	**New Jersey***	**4**
E6	Indiana	2
E3	New Jersey*	1
**E2**	**Miami***	**4**
**E2**	**Miami***	**4**
E7	Chicago	2
**W1**	**San Antonio***	**4**
W8	Sacramento	2
W1	San Antonio*	3
**W4**	**Dallas**	**4**
**W4**	**Dallas**	**4**
W5	Memphis	0
**Western Conference**
W3	Denver*	1
**W6**	**LA Clippers**	**4**
W6	LA Clippers	3
**W2**	**Phoenix***	**4**
**W2**	**Phoenix***	**4**
W7	LA Lakers	3

Conference finals
E1	Detroit*	2
**E2**	**Miami***	**4**
**W4**	**Dallas**	**4**
W2	Phoenix*	2

NBA Finals
**E2**	**Miami***	**4**
W4	Dallas	2

- * Division winner
- **Bold** Series winner
- Italic Team with home-court advantage

== Statistics leaders ==
Category	Player	Team	Stat
Points per game	Kobe Bryant	Los Angeles Lakers	35.4
Rebounds per game	Kevin Garnett	Minnesota Timberwolves	12.7
Assists per game	Steve Nash	Phoenix Suns	10.5
Steals per game	Gerald Wallace	Charlotte Bobcats	2.51
Blocks per game	Marcus Camby	Denver Nuggets	3.29
FG%	Shaquille O'Neal	Miami Heat	.600
FT%	Steve Nash	Phoenix Suns	.921
3FG%	Richard Hamilton	Detroit Pistons	.458

== Awards ==
=== Yearly awards ===
- Most Valuable Player: Steve Nash, Phoenix Suns
- Defensive Player of the Year: Ben Wallace, Detroit Pistons
- Rookie of the Year: Chris Paul, New Orleans/Oklahoma City Hornets
- Sixth Man of the Year: Mike Miller, Memphis Grizzlies
- Most Improved Player: Boris Diaw, Phoenix Suns
- Coach of the Year: Avery Johnson, Dallas Mavericks
- Executive of the Year: Elgin Baylor, Los Angeles Clippers
- Sportsmanship Award: Elton Brand, Los Angeles Clippers

- All-NBA First Team:
  - F LeBron James – Cleveland Cavaliers
  - F Dirk Nowitzki – Dallas Mavericks
  - C Shaquille O'Neal – Miami Heat
  - G Kobe Bryant – Los Angeles Lakers
  - G Steve Nash – Phoenix Suns
- NBA All-Defensive First Team:
  - Bruce Bowen – San Antonio Spurs
  - Ben Wallace – Detroit Pistons
  - Andrei Kirilenko – Utah Jazz
  - Ron Artest – Sacramento Kings
  - Kobe Bryant – Los Angeles Lakers
  - Jason Kidd – New Jersey Nets
- NBA All-Rookie First Team:
  - Chris Paul – New Orleans/Oklahoma City Hornets
  - Charlie Villanueva – Toronto Raptors
  - Andrew Bogut – Milwaukee Bucks
  - Deron Williams – Utah Jazz
  - Channing Frye – New York Knicks
- All-NBA Second Team:
  - F Elton Brand – Los Angeles Clippers
  - F Tim Duncan – San Antonio Spurs
  - C Ben Wallace – Detroit Pistons
  - G Dwyane Wade – Miami Heat
  - G Chauncey Billups – Detroit Pistons
- NBA All-Defensive Second Team:
  - Tim Duncan – San Antonio Spurs
  - Chauncey Billups – Detroit Pistons
  - Kevin Garnett – Minnesota Timberwolves
  - Marcus Camby – Denver Nuggets
  - Tayshaun Prince – Detroit Pistons
- NBA All-Rookie Second Team:
  - Danny Granger – Indiana Pacers
  - Raymond Felton – Charlotte Bobcats
  - Luther Head – Houston Rockets
  - Marvin Williams – Atlanta Hawks
  - Ryan Gomes – Boston Celtics
- All-NBA Third Team:
  - F Shawn Marion – Phoenix Suns
  - F Carmelo Anthony – Denver Nuggets
  - C Yao Ming – Houston Rockets
  - G Allen Iverson – Philadelphia 76ers
  - G Gilbert Arenas – Washington Wizards

=== Players of the month ===
The following players were named the Eastern and Western Conference Players of the Month.

Month	Eastern Conference	Western Conference	Ref.
October – November	LeBron James (Cleveland Cavaliers) (1/2)	Elton Brand (Los Angeles Clippers) (1/1)	
December	Vince Carter (New Jersey Nets) (1/1)	Dirk Nowitzki (Dallas Mavericks) (1/1)	
January	Chauncey Billups (Detroit Pistons) (1/1)	Kobe Bryant (Los Angeles Lakers) (1/2)	
February	Dwyane Wade (Miami Heat) (1/1)	Shawn Marion (Phoenix Suns) (1/1)	
March	LeBron James (Cleveland Cavaliers) (2/2)	Carmelo Anthony (Denver Nuggets) (1/1)	
April	Dwight Howard (Orlando Magic) (1/1)	Kobe Bryant (Los Angeles Lakers) (2/2)	

=== Rookies of the month ===
The following players were named the Eastern and Western Conference Rookies of the Month.

Month	Eastern Conference	Western Conference	Ref.
October – November	Channing Frye (New York Knicks) (1/1)	Chris Paul (New Orleans / Oklahoma City Hornets) (1/6)	
December	Charlie Villanueva (Toronto Raptors) (1/1)	Chris Paul (New Orleans / Oklahoma City Hornets) (2/6)	
January	Andrew Bogut (Milwaukee Bucks) (1/1)	Chris Paul (New Orleans / Oklahoma City Hornets) (3/6)	
February	Raymond Felton (Charlotte Bobcats) (1/3)	Chris Paul (New Orleans / Oklahoma City Hornets) (4/6)	
March	Raymond Felton (Charlotte Bobcats) (2/3)	Chris Paul (New Orleans / Oklahoma City Hornets) (5/6)	
April	Raymond Felton (Charlotte Bobcats) (3/3)	Chris Paul (New Orleans / Oklahoma City Hornets) (6/6)	

== See also ==
- List of NBA regular season records
