= 2003 NBA playoffs =

Postseason tournament

Tournament details
- Dates: April 19 – June 15, 2003
- Season: 2002–03
- Teams: 16

Final positions
- Champions: San Antonio Spurs (2nd title)
- Runners-up: New Jersey Nets
- Semifinalists: Dallas Mavericks; Detroit Pistons

Tournament statistics
- Scoring leader(s): Tim Duncan (Spurs) (24.7 PPG)

Awards
- MVP: Tim Duncan (Spurs)

The 2003 NBA playoffs was the postseason tournament of the National Basketball Association's 2002–03 season. The tournament concluded with the Western Conference champion San Antonio Spurs defeating the Eastern Conference champion New Jersey Nets, 4 games to 2, in the NBA Finals. Tim Duncan was named NBA Finals MVP for the second time.

== Overview ==
The 2003 Playoffs were notable for several reasons.

- This postseason featured the most series decided by six games in NBA playoff history. (Coincidentally, the Spurs won every single playoff series in six games en route to the championship.)
- For the first time since 1974, all series were conducted in a best-of-seven format. From 1984 to 2002, the first-round series were best of five. It is also notable as the only time the first round did not include any series sweeps.
- This is the first postseason that the NBA Playoffs carried more games on cable television than regular broadcast television, and marks the debut for the NBA Playoffs to be aired on NBA TV, and the return broadcast on ESPN and ABC after the NBA departed from NBC and TBS.
- This was the final postseason appearance for David Robinson, Steve Kerr, Shawn Kemp and John Stockton

The New Orleans Hornets made their first postseason appearance in franchise history. The franchise, which relocated to New Orleans and inherited the assets and personnel of the Charlotte Hornets, were retroactively considered an expansion team by 2014 after Charlotte (reactivated in 2004 as the Bobcats; was an expansion team in the pre-2014 timeline) reclaimed the original Hornets' franchise history in Charlotte from 1988 to 2002, while New Orleans (rebranded as the Pelicans in 2013) retained its franchise records from 2002 onward. In the pre-2014 timeline, the Hornets made the playoffs for a fourth consecutive season.

The Portland Trail Blazers and Utah Jazz continued the longest active Western Conference playoff appearance streaks at the time, entering their 21st and 20th postseason appearances, respectively.

The Minnesota Timberwolves entered their seventh consecutive postseason. In addition, they were awarded home-court advantage for the first time in franchise history in their series against the Los Angeles Lakers.

The Orlando Magic became the seventh team to lose a playoff series despite leading 3–1, losing to the Detroit Pistons in the first round. In an infamous post-game moment following Game 4, Tracy McGrady prematurely declared, "It feels good to get into the second round", not knowing that the NBA changed its first round series to a best-of-seven. The Magic would not win another playoff game again until 2008.

Game 5 of the Kings–Jazz series was the final game featuring Karl Malone and John Stockton as members of the Utah Jazz. Stockton would retire after the season while Malone would sign with the Lakers in the offseason. After this, the Jazz would not return to the playoffs until 2007.

With their first-round series loss to the Los Angeles Lakers, the Minnesota Timberwolves earned the dubious distinction of making their first seven postseason appearances, only to lose in the first round. They would break that streak by winning their first playoff series the following postseason.

The Portland Trail Blazers snapped a ten-game playoff losing streak dating back to 2000 with a Game 4 win in their first-round series against the Dallas Mavericks. The Trail Blazers also became the third team in NBA History to force a Game 7 after trailing 0–3 before bowing out. They would not return to the playoffs until 2009.

With their conference semifinals loss to the New Jersey Nets, the Boston Celtics were swept in a postseason series for the first time since 1983, and would not return to the Conference Semifinals until 2008.

With their conference semifinals loss to the San Antonio Spurs, the Lakers' championship streak was snapped at 3. With the win, the Spurs returned to the Western Conference Finals for the third time in five seasons.

With their conference semifinals win over the Philadelphia 76ers, the Detroit Pistons advanced to the Eastern Conference Finals for the first time since the Isiah Thomas and Joe Dumars-led team was swept by the Chicago Bulls in 1991. The Pistons would go on to appear in six consecutive Eastern Conference Finals through 2008, the most consecutive appearances for any Eastern Conference team since the Bill Russell-led Boston Celtics (1956–69).

With their conference semifinals victory over the Sacramento Kings, the Dallas Mavericks made the conference finals for the first time since 1988.

This was the first Western Conference Finals since 1995 to take place entirely in the state of Texas.

With their Eastern Conference Finals sweep of the Detroit Pistons, the New Jersey Nets won ten straight postseason games, the most since the 2001 Los Angeles Lakers.

In Game 6 of the Spurs–Mavericks series, Steve Kerr and Manu Ginóbili sparked a 42–15 run to help the Spurs advance to the NBA Finals for the first time since 1999. The Mavericks would not return to the Conference Finals (let alone face the Spurs in the playoffs) until 2006.

== Playoff qualifying ==
=== Western Conference ===
Seed	Team	Record
1	San Antonio Spurs	60–22 (2–2 head-to-head vs. DAL, 36–16 record vs. Western Conference)
2	Sacramento Kings	59–23
3	Dallas Mavericks	60–22 (2–2 head-to-head vs. SAS, 34–18 record vs. Western Conference)
4	Minnesota Timberwolves	51–31
5	Los Angeles Lakers	50–32 (2–2 head-to-head vs. POR, 15–9 record vs. Pacific Division, 33–19 record vs. Western Conference)
6	Portland Trail Blazers	50–32 (2–2 head-to-head vs. LAL, 15–9 record vs. Pacific Division, 29–23 record vs. Western Conference)
7	Utah Jazz	47–35
8	Phoenix Suns	44–38

=== Eastern Conference ===
Seed	Team	Record
1	Detroit Pistons	50–32
2	New Jersey Nets	49–33
3	Indiana Pacers	48–34 (2–2 head-to-head vs. PHI, 35–19 record vs. Eastern Conference)
4	Philadelphia 76ers	48–34 (2–2 head-to-head vs. IND, 35–19 record vs. Eastern Conference)
5	New Orleans Hornets	47–35
6	Boston Celtics	44–38
7	Milwaukee Bucks	42–40 (2–2 head-to-head vs. ORL, 32–22 record vs. Eastern Conference)
8	Orlando Magic	42–40 (2–2 head-to-head vs. MIL, 31–23 record vs. Eastern Conference)

== Bracket ==
First Round	Conference Semifinals
E1	Detroit*	4
E8	Orlando	3
E1	Detroit*	4
E4	Philadelphia	2
E4	Philadelphia	4
E5	New Orleans	2
Eastern Conference
E3	Indiana	2
E6	Boston	4
E6	Boston	0
E2	New Jersey*	4
E2	New Jersey*	4
E7	Milwaukee	2
W1	San Antonio*	4
W8	Phoenix	2
W1	San Antonio*	4
W5	LA Lakers	2
W4	Minnesota	2
W5	LA Lakers	4
Western Conference
W3	Dallas	4
W6	Portland	3
W3	Dallas	4
W2	Sacramento*	3
W2	Sacramento*	4
W7	Utah	1

Conference Finals
E1	Detroit*	0
E2	New Jersey*	4
W1	San Antonio*	4
W3	Dallas	2

NBA Finals
E2	New Jersey*	2
W1	San Antonio*	4

- * Division winner
- Bold Series winner
- Italic Team with home-court advantage

== First round ==
=== Eastern Conference first round ===
==== (1) Detroit Pistons vs. (8) Orlando Magic ====
TNT

April 20
12:30 PM

Boxscore

Orlando Magic 99, Detroit Pistons 94
Scoring by quarter: 24–19, 25–21, 27–32, 23–22
Pts: Tracy McGrady 43; Rebs: Drew Gooden 15; Asts: Jacque Vaughn 6	Pts: Richard Hamilton 28; Rebs: Ben Wallace 13; Asts: Chauncey Billups 8
Orlando leads series, 1–0

The Palace of Auburn Hills, Auburn Hills, Michigan
Attendance: 21,261
Referees: Tim Donaghy, Bennett Salvatore, Derrick Stafford

NBA TV

April 23
8:00 PM

Boxscore

Orlando Magic 77, Detroit Pistons 89
Scoring by quarter: 14–31, 26–23, 21–16, 16–19
Pts: Tracy McGrady 46; Rebs: Drew Gooden 11; Asts: Jacque Vaughn 6	Pts: Richard Hamilton 30; Rebs: Ben Wallace 16; Asts: Richard Hamilton 5
Series tied, 1–1

The Palace of Auburn Hills, Auburn Hills, Michigan
Attendance: 22,076
Referees: Sean Corbin, Dan Crawford, Greg Willard

ESPN

April 25
8:00 PM

Boxscore

Detroit Pistons 80, Orlando Magic 89
Scoring by quarter: 29–19, 17–29, 17–25, 17–16
Pts: Richard Hamilton 22; Rebs: Ben Wallace 22; Asts: Chauncey Billups 5	Pts: Tracy McGrady 29; Rebs: Gooden, McGrady 7 each Asts: Darrell Armstrong 8
Orlando leads series, 2–1

TD Waterhouse Centre, Orlando, Florida
Attendance: 17,283
Referees: Jess Kersey, Ken Mauer, Eddie F. Rush

ESPN

April 27
5:30 PM

Boxscore

Detroit Pistons 92, Orlando Magic 100
Scoring by quarter: 29–19, 21–35, 17–27, 25–19
Pts: Chauncey Billups 25; Rebs: Ben Wallace 24; Asts: Barry, Billups 3 each	Pts: Tracy McGrady 27; Rebs: Drew Gooden 13; Asts: Tracy McGrady 9
Orlando leads series, 3–1

TD Waterhouse Centre, Orlando, Florida
Attendance: 17,283
Referees: James Capers, Bob Delaney, Tom Washington

NBA TV

April 30
8:00 PM

Boxscore

Orlando Magic 67, Detroit Pistons 98
Scoring by quarter: 13–26, 24–24, 20–23, 10–25
Pts: Tracy McGrady 19; Rebs: Drew Gooden 15; Asts: Tracy McGrady 4	Pts: Richard Hamilton 24; Rebs: Ben Wallace 21; Asts: Billups, Robinson 4 each
Orlando leads series, 3–2

The Palace of Auburn Hills, Auburn Hills, Michigan
Attendance: 22,076
Referees: Tony Brothers, Mike Callahan, Steve Javie

NBA TV

May 2
7:00 PM

Boxscore

Detroit Pistons 103, Orlando Magic 88
Scoring by quarter: 30–21, 24–24, 23–21, 26–22
Pts: Chauncey Billups 40; Rebs: Ben Wallace 17; Asts: Chauncey Billups 4	Pts: Tracy McGrady 37; Rebs: Drew Gooden 12; Asts: Tracy McGrady 5
Series tied, 3–3

TD Waterhouse Centre, Orlando, Florida
Attendance: 16,909
Referees: Dick Bavetta, Jim Clark, Monty McCutchen

ABC

May 4
12:30 PM

Boxscore

Orlando Magic 93, Detroit Pistons 108
Scoring by quarter: 22–27, 24–31, 18–27, 29–23
Pts: Tracy McGrady 21; Rebs: Drew Gooden 17; Asts: Tracy McGrady 6	Pts: Chauncey Billups 37; Rebs: Ben Wallace 12; Asts: Michael Curry 6
Detroit wins series, 4–3

The Palace of Auburn Hills, Auburn Hills, Michigan
Attendance: 22,076
Referees: Dan Crawford, Bernie Fryer, Ron Garretson

The Pistons became the 7th team in NBA history to overcome a 3–1 series deficit. Additionally, the Pistons would again overcome a 3–1 series deficit against the Magic in the first round of the 2026 playoffs.

Regular-season series
Detroit won 2–1 in the regular-season series

December 25, 2002

Recap

Detroit Pistons 99, Orlando Magic 104

TD Waterhouse Centre, Orlando, Florida

January 13, 2003

Recap

Detroit Pistons 101, Orlando Magic 86

TD Waterhouse Centre, Orlando, Florida

February 13, 2003

Recap

Orlando Magic 88, Detroit Pistons 98

The Palace of Auburn Hills, Auburn Hills, Michigan

This was the second playoff meeting between these two teams, with the Magic winning the first meeting.

Previous playoff series
Orlando leads 1–0 in all-time playoff series

1996

Detroit Pistons 0, Orlando Magic 3

1996 Eastern Conference First Round

==== (2) New Jersey Nets vs. (7) Milwaukee Bucks ====
ABC

April 19
12:30 PM

Boxscore

Milwaukee Bucks 96, New Jersey Nets 109
Scoring by quarter: 20–29, 15–26, 25–34, 36–20
Pts: Tim Thomas 25; Rebs: Desmond Mason 8 Asts: Gary Payton 10	Pts: Kenyon Martin 21; Rebs: Kenyon Martin 15; Asts: Jason Kidd 14
New Jersey leads series, 1–0

Continental Airlines Arena, East Rutherford, New Jersey
Attendance: 16,102
Referees: Tony Brothers, Bernie Fryer, Ron Garretson

ESPN

April 22
7:00 PM

Boxscore

Milwaukee Bucks 88, New Jersey Nets 85
Scoring by quarter: 26–26, 23–23, 22–20, 17–16
Pts: Gary Payton 22; Rebs: Anthony Mason 8 Asts: Gary Payton 7	Pts: Kenyon Martin 22; Rebs: Kenyon Martin 12; Asts: Jason Kidd 8
Series tied, 1–1

Continental Airlines Arena, East Rutherford, New Jersey
Attendance: 17,633
Referees: Bob Delaney, Nolan Fine, Eddie F. Rush

TNT

April 24
7:30 PM

Boxscore

New Jersey Nets 103, Milwaukee Bucks 101
Scoring by quarter: 30–20, 24–19, 25–32, 24–30
Pts: Jason Kidd 26; Rebs: Collins, Martin 8 each Asts: Jason Kidd 7	Pts: Sam Cassell 24; Rebs: Tim Thomas 11; Asts: Gary Payton 8
New Jersey leads series, 2–1

Bradley Center, Milwaukee, Wisconsin
Attendance: 17,539
Referees: Joe DeRosa, Scott Foster, Tom Washington

TNT

April 26
4:00 PM

Boxscore

New Jersey Nets 114, Milwaukee Bucks 119 (OT)
Scoring by quarter: 26–25, 26–26, 23–36, 25–13, Overtime: 14–19
Pts: Kenyon Martin 30; Rebs: Jason Collins 8 Asts: Jason Kidd 10	Pts: Toni Kukoč 23; Rebs: Desmond Mason 8 Asts: Gary Payton 14
Series tied, 2–2

Bradley Center, Milwaukee, Wisconsin
Attendance: 18,391
Referees: Dick Bavetta, Steve Javie, Blane Reichelt

TNT

April 29
7:00 PM

Boxscore

Milwaukee Bucks 82, New Jersey Nets 89
Scoring by quarter: 22–20, 16–24, 23–17, 21–28
Pts: Toni Kukoč 18; Rebs: Desmond Mason 12; Asts: Gary Payton 5	Pts: Jason Kidd 19; Rebs: Richard Jefferson 16; Asts: Kidd, Martin 5 each
New Jersey leads series, 3–2

Continental Airlines Arena, East Rutherford, New Jersey
Attendance: 16,601
Referees: James Capers, Joe Crawford, Bill Spooner

TNT

May 1
7:00 PM

Boxscore

New Jersey Nets 113, Milwaukee Bucks 101
Scoring by quarter: 30–18, 26–26, 32–26, 25–31
Pts: Kenyon Martin 29; Rebs: Jason Kidd 11; Asts: Jason Kidd 11	Pts: Gary Payton 24; Rebs: Tim Thomas 6 Asts: Gary Payton 8
New Jersey wins series, 4–2

Bradley Center, Milwaukee, Wisconsin
Attendance: 18,717
Referees: David Jones, Jack Nies, Derrick Stafford

- In Game 3, Rodney Rogers hit the game-winner with 2 seconds left.
- This would be their last playoff match up until 2021, when the Nets already moved to Brooklyn was renamed to the Brooklyn Nets.
- As of 2026, this remains the Nets only playoff series win over Milwaukee.

Regular-season series
Tied 2–2 in the regular-season series

November 6, 2002

Recap

New Jersey Nets 93, Milwaukee Bucks 99

Bradley Center, Milwaukee

December 27, 2002

Recap

Milwaukee Bucks 90, New Jersey Nets 110

Continental Airlines Arena, East Rutherford, New Jersey

December 28, 2002

Recap

New Jersey Nets 104, Milwaukee Bucks 96

Bradley Center, Milwaukee

March 19, 2003

Recap

Milwaukee Bucks 104, New Jersey Nets 85

Continental Airlines Arena, East Rutherford, New Jersey

This was the third playoff meeting between these two teams, with the Bucks winning the first two meetings.

Previous playoff series
Milwaukee leads 2–0 in all-time playoff series

1984

Milwaukee Bucks 4, New Jersey Nets 2

1984 Eastern Conference Semifinals

1986

Milwaukee Bucks 3, New Jersey Nets 0

1986 Eastern Conference First Round

==== (3) Indiana Pacers vs. (6) Boston Celtics ====
ESPN

April 19
2:00 PM

Boxscore

Boston Celtics 103, Indiana Pacers 100
Scoring by quarter: 26–29, 26–29, 17–21, 34–21
Pts: Paul Pierce 40; Rebs: Paul Pierce 11; Asts: Paul Pierce 6	Pts: Ron Artest 26; Rebs: Jermaine O'Neal 9 Asts: Jamaal Tinsley 9
Boston leads series, 1–0

Conseco Fieldhouse, Indianapolis, Indiana
Attendance: 16,380
Referees: Ted Bernhardt, Sean Corbin, Joe Crawford

NBA TV

April 21
7:30 PM

Boxscore

Boston Celtics 77, Indiana Pacers 89
Scoring by quarter: 24–33, 24–21, 17–16, 12–19
Pts: Antoine Walker 19; Rebs: Tony Battie 11; Asts: Paul Pierce 6	Pts: Jermaine O'Neal 23; Rebs: Jermaine O'Neal 20; Asts: Jamaal Tinsley 7
Series tied, 1–1

Conseco Fieldhouse, Indianapolis, Indiana
Attendance: 15,881
Referees: Tony Brothers, Bernie Fryer, Ron Garretson

TNT

April 24
6:00 PM

Boxscore

Indiana Pacers 83, Boston Celtics 101
Scoring by quarter: 15–31, 29–17, 14–27, 25–26
Pts: Jermaine O'Neal 21; Rebs: Jermaine O'Neal 16; Asts: Jamaal Tinsley 8	Pts: Paul Pierce 21; Rebs: Paul Pierce 12; Asts: Walter McCarty 6
Boston leads series, 2–1

FleetCenter, Boston, Massachusetts
Attendance: 18,624
Referees: Mike Callahan, James Capers, Steve Javie

ESPN2

April 27
12:00 PM

Boxscore

Indiana Pacers 92, Boston Celtics 102
Scoring by quarter: 25–19, 23–17, 14–37, 30–29
Pts: Jermaine O'Neal 25; Rebs: Jermaine O'Neal 19; Asts: Jamaal Tinsley 13	Pts: Paul Pierce 37; Rebs: Antoine Walker 11; Asts: Paul Pierce 7
Boston leads series, 3–1

FleetCenter, Boston, Massachusetts
Attendance: 18,624
Referees: Joe DeRosa, Nolan Fine, Eddie F. Rush

NBA TV

April 29
8:30 PM

Boxscore

Boston Celtics 88, Indiana Pacers 93 (OT)
Scoring by quarter: 24–22, 26–26, 21–14, 17–26, Overtime: 0–5
Pts: Antoine Walker 21; Rebs: Eric Williams 8 Asts: Paul Pierce 8	Pts: Ron Artest 26; Rebs: Jermaine O'Neal 22; Asts: Tim Hardaway 6
Boston leads series, 3–2

Conseco Fieldhouse, Indianapolis, Indiana
Attendance: 15,326
Referees: Bob Delaney, Ronnie Nunn, Derrick Stafford

NBA TV

May 1
7:00 PM

Boxscore

Indiana Pacers 90, Boston Celtics 110
Scoring by quarter: 15–33, 19–17, 24–29, 32–31
Pts: Jermaine O'Neal 25; Rebs: Jermaine O'Neal 19; Asts: Erick Strickland 5	Pts: Paul Pierce 27; Rebs: Pierce, Williams 8 each Asts: Antoine Walker 5
Boston wins series, 4–2

FleetCenter, Boston, Massachusetts
Attendance: 18,624
Referees: Joe Crawford, Luis Grillo, Bill Spooner

- This would be both Boston's last playoff series win until 2008 & their last against Indiana until 2019.

Regular-season series
Tied 2–2 in the regular-season series

January 17, 2003

Recap

Indiana Pacers 93, Boston Celtics 98

FleetCenter, Boston

February 1, 2003

Recap

Boston Celtics 100, Indiana Pacers 109

Conseco Fieldhouse, Indianapolis

February 26, 2003

Recap

Indiana Pacers 69, Boston Celtics 71

FleetCenter, Boston

March 19, 2003

Recap

Boston Celtics 72, Indiana Pacers 102

Conseco Fieldhouse, Indianapolis

This was the third playoff meeting between these two teams, with the Celtics winning the first two meetings.

Previous playoff series
Boston leads 2–0 in all-time playoff series.

1991

Boston Celtics 3, Indiana Pacers 2

1991 Eastern Conference First Round

1992

Boston Celtics 3, Indiana Pacers 0

1992 Eastern Conference First Round

==== (4) Philadelphia 76ers vs. (5) New Orleans Hornets ====
TNT

April 20
8:00 PM

Boxscore

New Orleans Hornets 90, Philadelphia 76ers 98
Scoring by quarter: 20–27, 24–22, 24–21, 22–28
Pts: Jamal Mashburn 28; Rebs: P. J. Brown 8 Asts: Baron Davis 6	Pts: Allen Iverson 55; Rebs: Keith Van Horn 10; Asts: Eric Snow 10
Philadelphia leads series, 1–0

First Union Center, Philadelphia, Pennsylvania
Attendance: 19,711
Referees: Dick Bavetta, Bob Delaney, David Jones

TNT

April 23
7:00 PM

Boxscore

New Orleans Hornets 85, Philadelphia 76ers 90
Scoring by quarter: 22–27, 16–23, 28–26, 19–14
Pts: David Wesley 24; Rebs: Jamaal Magloire 8 Asts: Jamal Mashburn 6	Pts: Allen Iverson 29; Rebs: Kenny Thomas 16; Asts: Derrick Coleman 6
Philadelphia leads series, 2–0

First Union Center, Philadelphia, Pennsylvania
Attendance: 20,229
Referees: Tim Donaghy, Bernie Fryer, Ron Garretson

TNT

April 26
7:30 PM

Boxscore

Philadelphia 76ers 85, New Orleans Hornets 99
Scoring by quarter: 27–27, 19–20, 19–21, 20–31
Pts: Allen Iverson 28; Rebs: Keith Van Horn 9 Asts: Allen Iverson 7	Pts: Baron Davis 28; Rebs: P. J. Brown 12; Asts: Baron Davis 8
Philadelphia leads series, 2–1

New Orleans Arena, New Orleans, Louisiana
Attendance: 17,320
Referees: Luis Grillo, Jack Nies, Mark Wunderlich

TNT

April 28
7:30 PM

Boxscore

Philadelphia 76ers 96, New Orleans Hornets 87
Scoring by quarter: 25–20, 27–25, 22–21, 22–21
Pts: Allen Iverson 22; Rebs: Kenny Thomas 8 Asts: Eric Snow 12	Pts: Baron Davis 34; Rebs: P. J. Brown 9 Asts: Baron Davis 7
Philadelphia leads series, 3–1

New Orleans Arena, New Orleans, Louisiana
Attendance: 16,243
Referees: Mike Callahan, Steve Javie, Blane Reichelt

TNT

April 30
6:00 PM

Boxscore

New Orleans Hornets 93, Philadelphia 76ers 91
Scoring by quarter: 26–29, 21–21, 24–24, 22–17
Pts: Jamal Mashburn 21; Rebs: Jamaal Magloire 12; Asts: Baron Davis 10	Pts: Allen Iverson 30; Rebs: Kenny Thomas 14; Asts: Iverson, Snow 7 each
Philadelphia leads series, 3–2

First Union Center, Philadelphia, Pennsylvania
Attendance: 19,403
Referees: Jim Clark, Dan Crawford, Monty McCutchen

ESPN

May 2
8:30 PM

Boxscore

Philadelphia 76ers 107, New Orleans Hornets 103
Scoring by quarter: 25–31, 27–24, 31–32, 24–16
Pts: Allen Iverson 45; Rebs: Keith Van Horn 18; Asts: Eric Snow 9	Pts: Jamal Mashburn 36; Rebs: three players 8 each Asts: Baron Davis 11
Philadelphia wins series, 4–2

New Orleans Arena, New Orleans, Louisiana
Attendance: 18,570
Referees: Nolan Fine, Ken Mauer, Eddie F. Rush

Regular-season series
New Orleans won 2–1 in the regular-season series.

November 19, 2002

Recap

Philadelphia 76ers 98, New Orleans Hornets 99

New Orleans Arena, New Orleans, Louisiana

November 25, 2002

Recap

New Orleans Hornets 87, Philadelphia 76ers 108

First Union Center, Philadelphia, Pennsylvania

April 13, 2003

Recap

New Orleans Hornets 94, Philadelphia 76ers 89

First Union Center, Philadelphia, Pennsylvania

This was the first playoff meeting between the 76ers and the New Orleans Pelicans/Hornets franchise.

=== Western Conference first round ===
==== (1) San Antonio Spurs vs. (8) Phoenix Suns ====
ESPN

April 20
4:30 PM

Boxscore

Phoenix Suns 96, San Antonio Spurs 95 (OT)
Scoring by quarter: 16–23, 19–17, 25–23, 27–24, Overtime: 9–8
Pts: Stephon Marbury 26; Rebs: Shawn Marion 12; Asts: Stephon Marbury 6	Pts: Stephen Jackson 23; Rebs: Tim Duncan 13; Asts: Tony Parker 7
Phoenix leads series, 1–0

SBC Center, San Antonio, Texas
Attendance: 19,217
Referees: Scott Foster, Ken Mauer, Eddie F. Rush

TNT

April 21
7:00 PM

Boxscore

Phoenix Suns 76, San Antonio Spurs 84
Scoring by quarter: 23–16, 18–31, 21–16, 14–21
Pts: Stephon Marbury 32; Rebs: Shawn Marion 12; Asts: Stephon Marbury 5	Pts: Stephen Jackson 23; Rebs: Tim Duncan 12; Asts: Speedy Claxton 7
Series tied, 1–1

SBC Center, San Antonio, Texas
Attendance: 19,217
Referees: Joe Crawford, Luis Grillo, Mark Wunderlich

NBA TV

April 25
7:00 PM

Boxscore

San Antonio Spurs 99, Phoenix Suns 86
Scoring by quarter: 25–18, 28–18, 16–20, 30–30
Pts: Tony Parker 29; Rebs: Tim Duncan 23; Asts: Tim Duncan 6	Pts: Stephon Marbury 25; Rebs: Joe Johnson 9 Asts: Stephon Marbury 7
San Antonio leads series, 2–1

America West Arena, Phoenix, Arizona
Attendance: 19,023
Referees: Jim Clark, Dan Crawford, Monty McCutchen

TNT

April 27
7:30 PM

Boxscore

San Antonio Spurs 84, Phoenix Suns 86
Scoring by quarter: 17–19, 23–15, 23–22, 21–30
Pts: Tim Duncan 24; Rebs: Tim Duncan 11; Asts: Manu Ginóbili 5	Pts: Stephon Marbury 18; Rebs: Shawn Marion 14; Asts: Hardaway, Marbury 7 each
Series tied, 2–2

America West Arena, Phoenix, Arizona
Attendance: 18,756
Referees: Bernie Fryer, David Jones, Derrick Stafford

NBA TV

April 29
6:00 PM

Boxscore

Phoenix Suns 82, San Antonio Spurs 94
Scoring by quarter: 14–27, 16–27, 23–18, 29–22
Pts: Shawn Marion 22; Rebs: Amar'e Stoudemire 14; Asts: Stephon Marbury 7	Pts: Malik Rose 27; Rebs: Tim Duncan 17; Asts: Tim Duncan 6
San Antonio leads series, 3–2

SBC Center, San Antonio, Texas
Attendance: 19,217
Referees: Ted Bernhardt, Sean Corbin, Bennett Salvatore

TNT

May 1
9:30 PM

Boxscore

San Antonio Spurs 87, Phoenix Suns 85
Scoring by quarter: 25–21, 16–22, 23–18, 23–24
Pts: Stephen Jackson 21; Rebs: Tim Duncan 20; Asts: Tim Duncan 10	Pts: Shawn Marion 24; Rebs: Shawn Marion 15; Asts: Penny Hardaway 5
San Antonio wins series, 4–2

America West Arena, Phoenix, Arizona
Attendance: 18,913
Referees: Bob Delaney, Joe DeRosa, Joe Forte

In Game 1, after Amar'e Stoudemire banks in a game-tying 3 with 7.9 seconds left in regulation, Stephon Marbury hits the game-winning 3 at the buzzer in OT.

Regular-season series
Phoenix won 3–1 in the regular-season series

November 29, 2002

Recap

San Antonio Spurs 87, Phoenix Suns 94

America West Arena, Phoenix, Arizona

January 14, 2003

Recap

Phoenix Suns 100, San Antonio Spurs 108 (OT)

SBC Center, San Antonio, Texas

March 4, 2003

Recap

Phoenix Suns 104, San Antonio Spurs 97

SBC Center, San Antonio, Texas

April 13, 2003

Recap

San Antonio Spurs 85, Phoenix Suns 92

America West Arena, Phoenix, Arizona

This was the sixth playoff meeting between these two teams, with the Suns winning three of the first five meetings.

Previous playoff series
Phoenix leads 3–2 in all-time playoff series.

1992

Phoenix Suns 3, San Antonio Spurs 0

1992 Western Conference First Round

1993

Phoenix Suns 4, San Antonio Spurs 2

1993 Western Conference Semifinals

1996

Phoenix Suns 1, San Antonio Spurs 3

1996 Western Conference First Round

1998

Phoenix Suns 1, San Antonio Spurs 3

1998 Western Conference First Round

2000

Phoenix Suns 3, San Antonio Spurs 1

2000 Western Conference First Round

==== (2) Sacramento Kings vs. (7) Utah Jazz ====
TNT

April 19
7:30 PM

Boxscore

Utah Jazz 90, Sacramento Kings 96
Scoring by quarter: 25–19, 8–19, 21–23, 36–35
Pts: Karl Malone 25; Rebs: Greg Ostertag 11; Asts: Karl Malone 8	Pts: Chris Webber 27; Rebs: Chris Webber 11; Asts: Bobby Jackson 6
Sacramento leads series, 1–0

ARCO Arena, Sacramento, California
Attendance: 17,317
Referees: Hue Hollins, Jack Nies, Mark Wunderlich

TNT

April 21
7:30 PM

Boxscore

Utah Jazz 95, Sacramento Kings 108
Scoring by quarter: 22–25, 20–32, 22–25, 31–26
Pts: Andrei Kirilenko 17; Rebs: Matt Harpring 8 Asts: Mark Jackson 4	Pts: Peja Stojaković 29; Rebs: Clark, Divac 7 each Asts: Bobby Jackson 6
Sacramento leads series, 2–0

ARCO Arena, Sacramento, California
Attendance: 17,317
Referees: Ronnie Nunn, Blane Reichelt, Bill Spooner

ESPN

April 26
8:00 PM

Boxscore

Sacramento Kings 104, Utah Jazz 107
Scoring by quarter: 26–30, 29–29, 21–21, 28–27
Pts: Chris Webber 24; Rebs: Chris Webber 11; Asts: Mike Bibby 7	Pts: Greg Ostertag 22; Rebs: Greg Ostertag 12; Asts: John Stockton 7
Sacramento leads series, 2–1

Delta Center, Salt Lake City, Utah
Attendance: 19,911
Referees: Ted Bernhardt, Leroy Richardson, Bennett Salvatore

TNT

April 28
8:30 PM

Boxscore

Sacramento Kings 99, Utah Jazz 82
Scoring by quarter: 20–28, 17–13, 36–18, 26–23
Pts: Peja Stojaković 27; Rebs: Chris Webber 11; Asts: Mike Bibby 9	Pts: Karl Malone 24; Rebs: Greg Ostertag 14; Asts: John Stockton 7
Sacramento leads series, 3–1

Delta Center, Salt Lake City, Utah
Attendance: 19,911
Referees: Dick Bavetta, Ken Mauer, Ron Olesiak

TNT

April 30
8:00 PM

Boxscore

Utah Jazz 91, Sacramento Kings 111
Scoring by quarter: 15–29, 26–24, 27–32, 23–26
Pts: Harpring, Padgett 16 each Rebs: Scott Padgett 6 Asts: John Stockton 7	Pts: Chris Webber 26; Rebs: Chris Webber 11; Asts: Mike Bibby 7
Sacramento wins series, 4–1

ARCO Arena, Sacramento, California
Attendance: 17,317
Referees: Bernie Fryer, Tom Washington, Greg Willard

Game 5 was John Stockton's final NBA game. It was also Karl Malone's last game in Utah as he joined the Los Angeles Lakers during the following offseason.

Regular-season series
Sacramento won 3–1 in the regular-season series.

December 14, 2002

Recap

Sacramento Kings 98, Utah Jazz 96

Delta Center, Salt Lake City, Utah

January 28, 2003

Recap

Utah Jazz 102, Sacramento Kings 92

ARCO Arena, Sacramento, California

March 7, 2003

Recap

Sacramento Kings 108, Utah Jazz 105 (OT)

Delta Center, Salt Lake City, Utah

April 16, 2003

Recap

Utah Jazz 84, Sacramento Kings 95

ARCO Arena, Sacramento, California

This was the third playoff meeting between these two teams, with each team winning one series apiece.

Previous playoff series
Tied 1–1 in all-time playoff series

1999

Sacramento Kings 2, Utah Jazz 3

1999 Western Conference First Round

2002

Sacramento Kings 3, Utah Jazz 1

2002 Western Conference First Round

==== (3) Dallas Mavericks vs. (6) Portland Trail Blazers ====
TNT

April 19
7:00 PM

Boxscore

Portland Trail Blazers 86, Dallas Mavericks 96
Scoring by quarter: 21–23, 31–19, 12–28, 22–26
Pts: Rasheed Wallace 26; Rebs: Davis, Wells 10 each Asts: Scottie Pippen 5	Pts: Dirk Nowitzki 46; Rebs: Dirk Nowitzki 10; Asts: Steve Nash 9
Dallas leads series, 1–0

American Airlines Center, Dallas, Texas
Attendance: 20,336
Referees: Mike Callahan, Steve Javie, Ron Olesiak

TNT

April 23
8:30 PM

Boxscore

Portland Trail Blazers 99, Dallas Mavericks 103
Scoring by quarter: 19–23, 23–25, 29–24, 28–31
Pts: Bonzi Wells 45; Rebs: Dale Davis 15; Asts: Damon Stoudamire 5	Pts: Steve Nash 28; Rebs: Dirk Nowitzki 9 Asts: Steve Nash 8
Dallas leads series, 2–0

American Airlines Center, Dallas, Texas
Attendance: 20,356
Referees: Ted Bernhardt, Joe Forte, Bennett Salvatore

ESPN

April 25
7:30 PM

Boxscore

Dallas Mavericks 115, Portland Trail Blazers 103
Scoring by quarter: 30–22, 34–39, 20–24, 31–18
Pts: Dirk Nowitzki 42; Rebs: Dirk Nowitzki 10; Asts: Steve Nash 10	Pts: Ruben Patterson 19; Rebs: Zach Randolph 10; Asts: Bonzi Wells 6
Dallas leads series, 3–0

Rose Garden, Portland, Oregon
Attendance: 19,980
Referees: Joe Crawford, Hue Hollins, Greg Willard

TNT

April 27
5:00 PM

Boxscore

Dallas Mavericks 79, Portland Trail Blazers 98
Scoring by quarter: 23–26, 29–23, 10–33, 17–16
Pts: Dirk Nowitzki 26; Rebs: Dirk Nowitzki 11; Asts: Nick Van Exel 7	Pts: Zach Randolph 25; Rebs: Zach Randolph 15; Asts: Damon Stoudamire 11
Dallas leads series, 3–1

Rose Garden, Portland, Oregon
Attendance: 19,980
Referees: Jim Clark, Dan Crawford, Monty McCutchen

TNT

April 30
7:30 PM

Boxscore

Portland Trail Blazers 103, Dallas Mavericks 99
Scoring by quarter: 15–21, 28–29, 28–27, 32–22
Pts: Zach Randolph 22; Rebs: Zach Randolph 9 Asts: Bonzi Wells 7	Pts: Dirk Nowitzki 35; Rebs: Dirk Nowitzki 11; Asts: Steve Nash 11
Dallas leads series, 3–2

American Airlines Center, Dallas, Texas
Attendance: 20,438
Referees: Dick Bavetta, Scott Foster, Ken Mauer

ESPN

May 2
7:30 PM

Boxscore

Dallas Mavericks 103, Portland Trail Blazers 125
Scoring by quarter: 24–27, 14–37, 28–33, 37–28
Pts: Steve Nash 21; Rebs: Adrian Griffin 8 Asts: Steve Nash 6	Pts: Zach Randolph 21; Rebs: Zach Randolph 10; Asts: McInnis, Wallace 6 each
Series tied, 3–3

Rose Garden, Portland, Oregon
Attendance: 20,602
Referees: Bernie Fryer, Tom Washington, Mark Wunderlich

ABC

May 4
2:30 PM

Boxscore

Portland Trail Blazers 95, Dallas Mavericks 107
Scoring by quarter: 22–19, 23–26, 28–26, 22–36
Pts: Stoudamire, Wallace 17 each Rebs: Zach Randolph 10; Asts: Damon Stoudamire 9	Pts: Dirk Nowitzki 31; Rebs: Dirk Nowitzki 11; Asts: Steve Nash 7
Dallas wins series, 4–3

American Airlines Center, Dallas, Texas
Attendance: 20,281
Referees: Joe Crawford, Bob Delaney, Steve Javie

The Trail Blazers became the third NBA team to force a Game 7 after being down 0–3, after the New York Knicks in the 1951 NBA Finals and the Denver Nuggets in the 1994 Western Conference semifinals. This would not happen again until 2023.

Regular-season series
Tied 2–2 in the regular-season series

November 11, 2002

Recap

Portland Trail Blazers 73, Dallas Mavericks 82

American Airlines Center, Dallas, Texas

December 4, 2002

Recap

Dallas Mavericks 103, Portland Trail Blazers 88

Rose Garden Arena, Portland, Oregon

January 26, 2003

Recap

Portland Trail Blazers 100, Dallas Mavericks 93

American Airlines Center, Dallas, Texas

March 28, 2003

Recap

Dallas Mavericks 95, Portland Trail Blazers 112

Rose Garden Arena, Portland, Oregon

This was the third playoff meeting between these two teams, with the Trail Blazers winning the first two meetings.

Previous playoff series
Portland leads 2–0 in all-time playoff series

1985

Dallas Mavericks 1, Portland Trail Blazers 3

1985 Western Conference First Round

1990

Dallas Mavericks 0, Portland Trail Blazers 3

1990 Western Conference First Round

==== (4) Minnesota Timberwolves vs. (5) Los Angeles Lakers ====
ABC

April 20
2:00 PM

Boxscore

Los Angeles Lakers 117, Minnesota Timberwolves 98
Scoring by quarter: 39–23, 27–29, 22–24, 29–22
Pts: Kobe Bryant 39; Rebs: Shaquille O'Neal 10; Asts: Bryant, Horry 8 each	Pts: Kevin Garnett 23; Rebs: Kevin Garnett 14; Asts: Kevin Garnett 7
LA Lakers lead series, 1–0

Target Center, Minneapolis, Minnesota
Attendance: 17,097
Referees: Dan Crawford, Joe DeRosa, Jess Kersey

TNT

April 22
8:30 PM

Boxscore

Los Angeles Lakers 91, Minnesota Timberwolves 119
Scoring by quarter: 23–28, 20–29, 24–31, 24–31
Pts: Bryant, O'Neal 27 each Rebs: Shaquille O'Neal 14; Asts: Kobe Bryant 8	Pts: Troy Hudson 37; Rebs: Kevin Garnett 20; Asts: Troy Hudson 10
Series tied, 1–1

Target Center, Minneapolis, Minnesota
Attendance: 17,132
Referees: Scott Foster, Jack Nies, Tom Washington

TNT

April 24
8:00 PM

Boxscore

Minnesota Timberwolves 114, Los Angeles Lakers 110 (OT)
Scoring by quarter: 29–24, 23–22, 28–25, 21–30, Overtime: 13–9
Pts: Kevin Garnett 33; Rebs: Kevin Garnett 14; Asts: Rod Strickland 7	Pts: Kobe Bryant 30; Rebs: Shaquille O'Neal 17; Asts: Kobe Bryant 6
Minnesota leads series, 2–1

Staples Center, Los Angeles, California
Attendance: 18,997
Referees: Ronnie Nunn, Leroy Richardson, Bill Spooner

ABC

April 27
12:00 PM

Boxscore

Minnesota Timberwolves 97, Los Angeles Lakers 102
Scoring by quarter: 26–25, 19–18, 29–28, 23–31
Pts: Garnett, Hudson 28 each Rebs: Kevin Garnett 18; Asts: Kevin Garnett 5	Pts: Shaquille O'Neal 34; Rebs: Shaquille O'Neal 23; Asts: Shaquille O'Neal 6
Series tied, 2–2

Staples Center, Los Angeles, California
Attendance: 18,997
Referees: Joe Crawford, Joe Forte, Greg Willard

TNT

April 29
8:30 PM

Boxscore

Los Angeles Lakers 120, Minnesota Timberwolves 90
Scoring by quarter: 28–25, 30–23, 36–25, 26–17
Pts: Kobe Bryant 32; Rebs: Shaquille O'Neal 11; Asts: Devean George 6	Pts: Kevin Garnett 25; Rebs: Kevin Garnett 16; Asts: Troy Hudson 7
LA Lakers lead series, 3–2

Target Center, Minneapolis, Minnesota
Attendance: 20,098
Referees: Tim Donaghy, Eddie F. Rush, Mark Wunderlich

TNT

May 1
9:30 PM

Boxscore

Minnesota Timberwolves 85, Los Angeles Lakers 101
Scoring by quarter: 30–25, 13–22, 20–22, 22–32
Pts: Garnett, Hudson 18 each Rebs: Kevin Garnett 12; Asts: Garnett, Szczerbiak 5 each	Pts: Kobe Bryant 31; Rebs: Shaquille O'Neal 17; Asts: Shaquille O'Neal 9
LA Lakers win series, 4–2

Staples Center, Los Angeles, California
Attendance: 18,997
Referees: Ron Garretson, Blane Reichelt, Bennett Salvatore

Regular-season series
Tied 2–2 in the regular-season series

December 1, 2002

Recap

Minnesota Timberwolves 110, Los Angeles Lakers 107

Staples Center, Los Angeles, California

December 17, 2002

Recap

Los Angeles Lakers 80, Minnesota Timberwolves 96

Target Center, Minneapolis, Minnesota

March 7, 2003

Recap

Minnesota Timberwolves 96, Los Angeles Lakers 106

Staples Center, Los Angeles, California

March 14, 2003

Recap

Los Angeles Lakers 106, Minnesota Timberwolves 99

Target Center, Minneapolis, Minnesota

This was the first playoff meeting between the Lakers and the Timberwolves.

== Conference semifinals ==
=== Eastern Conference semifinals ===
==== (1) Detroit Pistons vs. (4) Philadelphia 76ers ====
ESPN

May 6
8:00 PM

Boxscore

Philadelphia 76ers 87, Detroit Pistons 98
Scoring by quarter: 21–24, 19–25, 26–24, 21–25
Pts: Allen Iverson 27; Rebs: Derrick Coleman 8 Asts: Allen Iverson 8	Pts: Richard Hamilton 25; Rebs: Ben Wallace 12; Asts: Billups, Robinson 4 each
Detroit leads series, 1–0

The Palace of Auburn Hills, Auburn Hills, Michigan
Attendance: 22,076
Referees: Joe Crawford, Joe Forte, Ronnie Nunn

ESPN

May 8
7:00 PM

Boxscore

Philadelphia 76ers 97, Detroit Pistons 104 (OT)
Scoring by quarter: 25–30, 19–22, 27–19, 21–21, Overtime: 5–12
Pts: Allen Iverson 31; Rebs: Kenny Thomas 19; Asts: Allen Iverson 7	Pts: Atkins, Hamilton 23 each Rebs: Ben Wallace 15; Asts: Richard Hamilton 6
Detroit leads series, 2–0

The Palace of Auburn Hills, Auburn Hills, Michigan
Attendance: 22,076
Referees: Bob Delaney, Monty McCutchen, Bennett Salvatore

ESPN

May 10
7:00 PM

Boxscore

Detroit Pistons 83, Philadelphia 76ers 93
Scoring by quarter: 19–23, 18–25, 15–21, 31–24
Pts: Richard Hamilton 24; Rebs: Mehmet Okur 10; Asts: Billups, Robinson 4 each	Pts: Allen Iverson 25; Rebs: Kenny Thomas 14; Asts: Allen Iverson 11
Detroit leads series, 2–1

First Union Center, Philadelphia, Pennsylvania
Attendance: 20,743
Referees: Joe DeRosa, Eddie F. Rush, Bill Spooner

ESPN

May 11
8:00 PM

Boxscore

Detroit Pistons 82, Philadelphia 76ers 95
Scoring by quarter: 18–21, 14–22, 21–18, 29–34
Pts: Richard Hamilton 30; Rebs: Ben Wallace 15; Asts: three players 3 each	Pts: Allen Iverson 36; Rebs: Derrick Coleman 15; Asts: Allen Iverson 11
Series tied, 2–2

First Union Center, Philadelphia, Pennsylvania
Attendance: 20,549
Referees: Dick Bavetta, Bernie Fryer, Greg Willard

ESPN

May 14
8:00 PM

Boxscore

Philadelphia 76ers 77, Detroit Pistons 78
Scoring by quarter: 23–30, 13–15, 21–18, 20–15
Pts: Derrick Coleman 23; Rebs: Derrick Coleman 11; Asts: Allen Iverson 9	Pts: Richard Hamilton 20; Rebs: Ben Wallace 17; Asts: Atkins, Hamilton 5 each
Detroit leads series, 3–2

The Palace of Auburn Hills, Auburn Hills, Michigan
Attendance: 22,076
Referees: Mike Callahan, Jim Clark, Steve Javie

ESPN

May 16
7:30 PM

Boxscore

Detroit Pistons 93, Philadelphia 76ers 89 (OT)
Scoring by quarter: 15–24, 21–20, 27–20, 18–17, Overtime: 12–8
Pts: Chauncey Billups 28; Rebs: Ben Wallace 18; Asts: Chauncey Billups 5	Pts: Allen Iverson 38; Rebs: Kenny Thomas 14; Asts: Allen Iverson 9
Detroit wins series, 4–2

First Union Center, Philadelphia, Pennsylvania
Attendance: 20,888
Referees: Ron Garretson, Ken Mauer, Bennett Salvatore

- In Game 5, Chucky Atkins hit the game-winning layup with 0.9 seconds left after Derrick Coleman was called for goaltending on the shot.

Regular-season series
Tied 2–2 in the regular-season series

January 8, 2003

Recap

Detroit Pistons 103, Philadelphia 76ers 94 (OT)

First Union Center, Philadelphia, Pennsylvania

January 22, 2003

Recap

Philadelphia 76ers 92, Detroit Pistons 83

The Palace of Auburn Hills, Auburn Hills, Michigan

March 20, 2003

Recap

Philadelphia 76ers 85, Detroit Pistons 113

The Palace of Auburn Hills, Auburn Hills, Michigan

April 8, 2003

Recap

Detroit Pistons 74, Philadelphia 76ers 91

First Union Center, Philadelphia, Pennsylvania

This was the second playoff meeting between these two teams, with the 76ers winning the first meeting, which occurred when the Nationals/76ers franchise were in Syracuse and the Pistons franchise were in Fort Wayne.

Previous playoff series
Philadelphia/ Syracuse leads 1–0 in all-time playoff series

1955

Fort Wayne Pistons 3, Syracuse Nationals 4

1955 NBA Finals

==== (2) New Jersey Nets vs. (6) Boston Celtics ====
TNT

May 5
7:00 PM

Boxscore

Boston Celtics 93, New Jersey Nets 97
Scoring by quarter: 23–20, 23–29, 27–23, 20–25
Pts: Paul Pierce 34; Rebs: Antoine Walker 8 Asts: Paul Pierce 8	Pts: Kenyon Martin 21; Rebs: Jefferson, Williams 9 each Asts: Jason Kidd 9
New Jersey leads series, 1–0

Continental Airlines Arena, East Rutherford, New Jersey
Attendance: 17,343
Referees: Scott Foster, Bennett Salvatore, Tom Washington

TNT

May 7
7:00 PM

Boxscore

Boston Celtics 95, New Jersey Nets 104
Scoring by quarter: 25–19, 20–32, 21–31, 29–22
Pts: Paul Pierce 32; Rebs: Paul Pierce 10; Asts: Paul Pierce 11	Pts: Richard Jefferson 25; Rebs: Jason Kidd 11; Asts: Jason Kidd 8
New Jersey leads series, 2–0

Continental Airlines Arena, East Rutherford, New Jersey
Attendance: 19,934
Referees: Dick Bavetta, Jim Clark, Steve Javie

TNT

May 9
8:00 PM

Boxscore

New Jersey Nets 94, Boston Celtics 76
Scoring by quarter: 24–15, 23–24, 29–17, 18–20
Pts: Kenyon Martin 25; Rebs: Jason Kidd 9 Asts: Jason Kidd 11	Pts: Paul Pierce 23; Rebs: Antoine Walker 15; Asts: Tony Delk 6
New Jersey leads series, 3–0

FleetCenter, Boston, Massachusetts
Attendance: 18,624
Referees: Dan Crawford, Derrick Stafford, Greg Willard

TNT

May 12
8:00 PM

Boxscore

New Jersey Nets 110, Boston Celtics 101 (2OT)
Scoring by quarter: 21–23, 29–26, 21–20, 19–21, Overtime: 7–7, 13–4
Pts: Jason Kidd 29; Rebs: Kidd, Martin 10 each Asts: Jason Kidd 8	Pts: Paul Pierce 27; Rebs: Paul Pierce 10; Asts: Pierce, Walker 7 each
New Jersey wins series, 4–0

FleetCenter, Boston, Massachusetts
Attendance: 18,624
Referees: Joe Crawford, Hue Hollins, Bill Spooner

Regular-season series
New Jersey won 3–1 in the regular-season series

November 20, 2002

Recap

New Jersey Nets 79, Boston Celtics 96

FleetCenter, Boston

December 25, 2002

Recap

Boston Celtics 81, New Jersey Nets 117

Continental Airlines Arena, East Rutherford, New Jersey

March 13, 2003

Recap

Boston Celtics 75, New Jersey Nets 90

Continental Airlines Arena, East Rutherford, New Jersey

March 18, 2003

Recap

New Jersey Nets 87, Boston Celtics 74

FleetCenter, Boston

This was the second playoff meeting between these two teams, with the Nets winning the first meeting.

Previous playoff series
New Jersey leads 1–0 in all-time playoff series

2002

Boston Celtics 2, New Jersey Nets 4

2002 Eastern Conference Finals

=== Western Conference semifinals ===
==== (1) San Antonio Spurs vs. (5) Los Angeles Lakers ====
TNT

May 5
8:30 PM

Boxscore

Los Angeles Lakers 82, San Antonio Spurs 87
Scoring by quarter: 16–20, 19–18, 17–22, 30–27
Pts: Kobe Bryant 37; Rebs: Shaquille O'Neal 21; Asts: Shaquille O'Neal 3	Pts: Tim Duncan 28; Rebs: David Robinson 11; Asts: Tim Duncan 7
San Antonio leads series, 1–0

SBC Center, San Antonio, Texas
Attendance: 18,797
Referees: Mike Callahan, James Capers, Eddie F. Rush

TNT

May 7
8:30 PM

Boxscore

Los Angeles Lakers 95, San Antonio Spurs 114
Scoring by quarter: 18–31, 25–29, 24–34, 28–20
Pts: Bryant, O'Neal 27 each Rebs: Shaquille O'Neal 10; Asts: Jannero Pargo 3	Pts: Bruce Bowen 27; Rebs: Tim Duncan 13; Asts: Tim Duncan 7
San Antonio leads series, 2–0

SBC Center, San Antonio, Texas
Attendance: 18,797
Referees: Bernie Fryer, Ken Mauer, Derrick Stafford

TNT

May 9
7:30 PM

Boxscore

San Antonio Spurs 95, Los Angeles Lakers 110
Scoring by quarter: 17–29, 19–21, 31–31, 28–29
Pts: Tim Duncan 28; Rebs: Tim Duncan 11; Asts: Jackson, Parker 4 each	Pts: Kobe Bryant 39; Rebs: Shaquille O'Neal 16; Asts: Shaquille O'Neal 8
San Antonio leads series, 2–1

Staples Center, Los Angeles, California
Attendance: 18,997
Referees: Ron Garretson, Steve Javie, Mark Wunderlich

ABC

May 11
12:30 PM

Boxscore

San Antonio Spurs 95, Los Angeles Lakers 99
Scoring by quarter: 24–19, 22–20, 21–32, 28–28
Pts: Tim Duncan 36; Rebs: Stephen Jackson 10; Asts: Tim Duncan 5	Pts: Kobe Bryant 35; Rebs: Shaquille O'Neal 17; Asts: Shaquille O'Neal 5
Series tied, 2–2

Staples Center, Los Angeles, California
Attendance: 18,997
Referees: Jack Nies, Bennett Salvatore, Tom Washington

TNT

May 13
8:30 PM

Boxscore

Los Angeles Lakers 94, San Antonio Spurs 96
Scoring by quarter: 18–29, 20–27, 26–24, 30–16
Pts: Kobe Bryant 36; Rebs: Shaquille O'Neal 12; Asts: Kobe Bryant 6	Pts: Tim Duncan 27; Rebs: Tim Duncan 14; Asts: Tim Duncan 5
San Antonio leads series, 3–2

SBC Center, San Antonio, Texas
Attendance: 18,797
Referees: Ed Bernhardt, Dan Crawford, Bob Delaney

ABC

May 15
5:00 PM

Boxscore

San Antonio Spurs 110, Los Angeles Lakers 82
Scoring by quarter: 29–25, 25–25, 24–19, 32–13
Pts: Tim Duncan 37; Rebs: Tim Duncan 16; Asts: Tony Parker 5	Pts: Shaquille O'Neal 31; Rebs: Shaquille O'Neal 10; Asts: Kobe Bryant 6
San Antonio wins series, 4–2

Staples Center, Los Angeles, California
Attendance: 18,997
Referees: Dick Bavetta, Joe Crawford, Joe DeRosa

- In Game 5, the Lakers nearly overcame a 25-point deficit, but Robert Horry's potential game-winning 3 went in and out.

Regular-season series
San Antonio won 4–0 in the regular-season series

October 29, 2002

Recap

San Antonio Spurs 87, Los Angeles Lakers 82

Staples Center, Los Angeles, California

November 20, 2002

Recap

Los Angeles Lakers 88, San Antonio Spurs 95

SBC Center, San Antonio, Texas

February 14, 2003

Recap

San Antonio Spurs 103, Los Angeles Lakers 95

Staples Center, Los Angeles, California

March 23, 2003

Recap

Los Angeles Lakers 89, San Antonio Spurs 98

SBC Center, San Antonio, Texas

This was the ninth playoff meeting between these two teams, with the Lakers winning six of the first eight meetings.

Previous playoff series
Los Angeles leads 6–2 in all-time playoff series

1982

Los Angeles Lakers 4, San Antonio Spurs 0

1982 Western Conference Finals

1983

Los Angeles Lakers 4, San Antonio Spurs 2

1983 Western Conference Finals

1986

Los Angeles Lakers 3, San Antonio Spurs 0

1986 Western Conference First Round

1988

Los Angeles Lakers 3, San Antonio Spurs 0

1988 Western Conference First Round

1995

Los Angeles Lakers 2, San Antonio Spurs 4

1995 Western Conference Semifinals

1999

Los Angeles Lakers 0, San Antonio Spurs 4

1999 Western Conference Semifinals

2001

Los Angeles Lakers 4, San Antonio Spurs 0

2001 Western Conference Finals

2002

Los Angeles Lakers 4, San Antonio Spurs 1

2002 Western Conference Semifinals

==== (2) Sacramento Kings vs. (3) Dallas Mavericks ====
ESPN

May 6
8:00 PM

Boxscore

Sacramento Kings 124, Dallas Mavericks 113
Scoring by quarter: 33–24, 29–26, 36–26, 26–37
Pts: Peja Stojaković 26; Rebs: Christie, Stojaković 9 each Asts: Chris Webber 9	Pts: three players 20 each Rebs: Dirk Nowitzki 11; Asts: Steve Nash 7
Sacramento leads series, 1–0

American Airlines Center, Dallas, Texas
Attendance: 20,525
Referees: Tony Brothers, Dan Crawford, Jack Nies

ESPN

May 8
8:30 PM

Boxscore

Sacramento Kings 110, Dallas Mavericks 132
Scoring by quarter: 40–44, 21–39, 24–30, 25–19
Pts: Chris Webber 31; Rebs: Bobby Jackson 8 Asts: Doug Christie 9	Pts: Nick Van Exel 36; Rebs: Dirk Nowitzki 12; Asts: Steve Nash 7
Series tied, 1–1

American Airlines Center, Dallas, Texas
Attendance: 20,491
Referees: Ted Bernhardt, Joe DeRosa, Eddie F. Rush

ESPN

May 10
6:30 PM

Boxscore

Dallas Mavericks 141, Sacramento Kings 137 (2OT)
Scoring by quarter: 23–36, 39–28, 20–27, 31–22, Overtime: 12–12, 16–12
Pts: Nick Van Exel 40; Rebs: Dirk Nowitzki 20; Asts: Steve Nash 11	Pts: Peja Stojaković 39; Rebs: Bobby Jackson 11; Asts: Doug Christie 7
Dallas leads series, 2–1

ARCO Arena, Sacramento, California
Attendance: 17,317
Referees: Mike Callahan, Joe Crawford, Hue Hollins

TNT

May 11
7:30 PM

Boxscore

Dallas Mavericks 83, Sacramento Kings 99
Scoring by quarter: 20–24, 17–28, 24–29, 22–18
Pts: Bell, Finley 16 each Rebs: Dirk Nowitzki 11; Asts: Steve Nash 6	Pts: Hedo Türkoğlu 17; Rebs: Peja Stojaković 12; Asts: Doug Christie 7
Series tied, 2–2

ARCO Arena, Sacramento, California
Attendance: 17,317
Referees: Ron Garretson, Steve Javie, Mark Wunderlich

TNT

May 13
6:00 PM

Boxscore

Sacramento Kings 93, Dallas Mavericks 112
Scoring by quarter: 33–24, 28–30, 10–29, 22–29
Pts: Doug Christie 21; Rebs: Christie, Pollard 9 each Asts: Doug Christie 7	Pts: Steve Nash 25; Rebs: Dirk Nowitzki 15; Asts: Dirk Nowitzki 9
Dallas leads series, 3–2

American Airlines Center, Dallas, Texas
Attendance: 20,556
Referees: Ken Mauer, Bennett Salvatore, Tom Washington

TNT

May 15
7:30 PM

Boxscore

Dallas Mavericks 109, Sacramento Kings 115
Scoring by quarter: 24–21, 28–36, 35–32, 22–26
Pts: Nick Van Exel 35; Rebs: Dirk Nowitzki 12; Asts: Finley, Nash 4 each	Pts: Peja Stojaković 24; Rebs: Jim Jackson 12; Asts: Doug Christie 6
Series tied, 3–3

ARCO Arena, Sacramento, California
Attendance: 17,317
Referees: Dan Crawford, Bob Delaney, Joe Forte

ABC

May 17
7:00 PM

Boxscore

Sacramento Kings 99, Dallas Mavericks 112
Scoring by quarter: 19–23, 24–25, 24–28, 32–36
Pts: Mike Bibby 25; Rebs: Peja Stojaković 9 Asts: Bibby, Jackson 5 each	Pts: Dirk Nowitzki 30; Rebs: Dirk Nowitzki 19; Asts: Steve Nash 13
Dallas wins series, 4–3

American Airlines Center, Dallas, Texas
Attendance: 20,595
Referees: Bernie Fryer, Steve Javie, Eddie F. Rush

Regular-season series
Sacramento won 3–1 in the regular-season series

January 15, 2003

Recap

Dallas Mavericks 94, Sacramento Kings 123

ARCO Arena, Sacramento, California

February 4, 2003

Recap

Sacramento Kings 110, Dallas Mavericks 109

American Airlines Center, Dallas, Texas

February 27, 2003

Recap

Sacramento Kings 126, Dallas Mavericks 124 (OT)

American Airlines Center, Dallas, Texas

March 16, 2003

Recap

Dallas Mavericks 129, Sacramento Kings 123 (OT)

ARCO Arena, Sacramento, California

This was the second playoff meeting between these two teams, with the Kings winning the first meeting.

Previous playoff series
Sacramento leads 1–0 in all-time playoff series

2002

Dallas Mavericks 1, Sacramento Kings 4

2002 Western Conference Semifinals

== Conference finals ==
=== Eastern Conference finals ===
==== (1) Detroit Pistons vs. (2) New Jersey Nets ====
ABC

May 18
1:30 pm

Boxscore

New Jersey Nets 76, Detroit Pistons 74
Scoring by quarter: 22–16, 21–20, 12–27, 21–11
Pts: Kenyon Martin 16; Rebs: Jason Collins 10; Asts: Jason Kidd 7	Pts: Richard Hamilton 24; Rebs: Ben Wallace 22; Asts: Chauncey Billups 6
New Jersey leads series, 1–0

The Palace of Auburn Hills, Auburn Hills, Michigan
Attendance: 22,076
Referees: Dan Crawford, Jack Nies, Derrick Stafford

ESPN

May 20
8:00 pm

Boxscore

New Jersey Nets 88, Detroit Pistons 86
Scoring by quarter: 20–19, 19–23, 19–25, 30–19
Pts: Kenyon Martin 25; Rebs: Jason Collins 14; Asts: Jason Kidd 5	Pts: Richard Hamilton 24; Rebs: Ben Wallace 19; Asts: Chauncey Billups 10
New Jersey leads series, 2–0

The Palace of Auburn Hills, Auburn Hills, Michigan
Attendance: 22,076
Referees: Joe DeRosa, Bernie Fryer, Tom Washington

ABC

May 22
8:30 pm

Boxscore

Detroit Pistons 85, New Jersey Nets 97
Scoring by quarter: 23–28, 23–29, 19–23, 20–17
Pts: Richard Hamilton 21; Rebs: Ben Wallace 15; Asts: Five players 3 each	Pts: Jason Kidd 34; Rebs: Jason Kidd 12; Asts: Jason Kidd 6
New Jersey leads series, 3–0

Continental Airlines Arena, East Rutherford, New Jersey
Attendance: 19,923
Referees: Mike Callahan, Ken Mauer, Eddie F. Rush

ESPN

May 24
8:00 pm

Boxscore

Detroit Pistons 82, New Jersey Nets 102
Scoring by quarter: 23–28, 18–22, 23–23, 18–29
Pts: Clifford Robinson 21; Rebs: Ben Wallace 13; Asts: Chauncey Billups 6	Pts: Jason Kidd 26; Rebs: Jason Kidd 12; Asts: Jason Kidd 7
New Jersey wins series, 4–0

Continental Airlines Arena, East Rutherford, New Jersey
Attendance: 19,923
Referees: Dick Bavetta, Steve Javie, Greg Willard

- Jason Kidd hit the game-winning jumper with 1.4 seconds left in Game 1.

Regular-season series
Detroit won 2–1 in the regular-season series

December 15, 2002

Recap

New Jersey Nets 91, Detroit Pistons 101

The Palace of Auburn Hills, Auburn Hills, Michigan

December 21, 2002

Recap

Detroit Pistons 92, New Jersey Nets 100

Continental Airlines Arena, East Rutherford, New Jersey

February 1, 2003

Recap

New Jersey Nets 84, Detroit Pistons 106

The Palace of Auburn Hills, Auburn Hills, Michigan

This was the second playoff meeting between these two teams, with the Pistons winning the first meeting.

Previous playoff series
Detroit leads 1–0 in all-time playoff series

1985

Detroit Pistons 3, New Jersey Nets 0

1985 Eastern Conference First Round

=== Western Conference finals ===
==== (1) San Antonio Spurs vs. (3) Dallas Mavericks ====
TNT

May 19
8:30 PM

Boxscore

Dallas Mavericks 113, San Antonio Spurs 110
Scoring by quarter: 23–36, 34–30, 26–25, 30–19
Pts: Dirk Nowitzki 38; Rebs: Dirk Nowitzki 15; Asts: Steve Nash 3	Pts: Tim Duncan 40; Rebs: Tim Duncan 15; Asts: Tim Duncan 7
Dallas leads series, 1–0

SBC Center, San Antonio, Texas
Attendance: 18,797
Referees: Ron Garretson, Bennett Salvatore, Greg Willard

TNT

May 21
7:30 PM

Boxscore

Dallas Mavericks 106, San Antonio Spurs 119
Scoring by quarter: 24–35, 20–34, 31–25, 31–25
Pts: Michael Finley 29; Rebs: Finley, Nowitzki 10 each Asts: Steve Nash 8	Pts: Tim Duncan 32; Rebs: Tim Duncan 15; Asts: Duncan, Jackson 5 each
Series tied, 1–1

SBC Center, San Antonio, Texas
Attendance: 18,797
Referees: Dick Bavetta, Ted Bernhardt, Joe Crawford

TNT

May 23
8:00 PM

Boxscore

San Antonio Spurs 96, Dallas Mavericks 83
Scoring by quarter: 18–18, 20–28, 31–20, 27–17
Pts: Tim Duncan 34; Rebs: Tim Duncan 24; Asts: Tim Duncan 6	Pts: Nick Van Exel 16; Rebs: Dirk Nowitzki 9 Asts: Steve Nash 9
San Antonio leads series, 2–1

American Airlines Center, Dallas, Texas
Attendance: 20,695
Referees: Dan Crawford, Bob Delaney, Bill Spooner

TNT

May 25
7:30 PM

Boxscore

San Antonio Spurs 102, Dallas Mavericks 95
Scoring by quarter: 21–24, 26–28, 30–18, 25–25
Pts: Tony Parker 25; Rebs: Tim Duncan 20; Asts: Tim Duncan 7	Pts: Finley, Nash 25 each Rebs: Van Exel, Williams 8 each Asts: Van Exel, Williams 3 each
San Antonio leads series, 3–1

American Airlines Center, Dallas, Texas
Attendance: 20,561
Referees: Joe DeRosa, Bernie Fryer, Derrick Stafford

TNT

May 27
8:00 PM

Boxscore

Dallas Mavericks 103, San Antonio Spurs 91
Scoring by quarter: 23–30, 24–28, 27–23, 29–10
Pts: Michael Finley 31; Rebs: three players 8 each Asts: Steve Nash 6	Pts: Tim Duncan 23; Rebs: Tim Duncan 15; Asts: three players 6 each
San Antonio leads series, 3–2

SBC Center, San Antonio, Texas
Attendance: 18,797
Referees: Mike Callahan, Jack Nies, Eddie F. Rush

TNT

May 29
8:00 PM

Boxscore

San Antonio Spurs 90, Dallas Mavericks 78
Scoring by quarter: 22–22, 18–24, 16–23, 34–9
Pts: Stephen Jackson 24; Rebs: Duncan, Rose 11 each Asts: three players 4 each	Pts: Nick Van Exel 19; Rebs: Raef LaFrentz 12; Asts: Steve Nash 11
San Antonio wins series, 4–2

American Airlines Center, Dallas, Texas
Attendance: 20,812
Referees: Ron Garretson, Steve Javie, Tom Washington

Steve Kerr puts on a shooting performance for the ages connecting on 4 3-pointers closing out Dallas in game 6. Dirk Nowitzki missed the final three games with a knee injury.

Regular-season series
Tied 2–2 in the regular-season series

December 11, 2002

Recap

Dallas Mavericks 104, San Antonio Spurs 111

SBC Center, San Antonio, Texas

February 20, 2003

Recap

San Antonio Spurs 87, Dallas Mavericks 95

American Airlines Center, Dallas, Texas

March 20, 2003

Recap

San Antonio Spurs 112, Dallas Mavericks 110 (OT)

American Airlines Center, Dallas, Texas

April 16, 2003

Recap

Dallas Mavericks 93, San Antonio Spurs 72

SBC Center, San Antonio, Texas

This was the second playoff meeting between these two teams, with the Spurs winning the first meeting.

Previous playoff series
San Antonio leads 1–0 in all-time playoff series

2001

Dallas Mavericks 1, San Antonio Spurs 4

2001 Western Conference Semifinals

== NBA Finals (W1) San Antonio Spurs vs. (E2) New Jersey Nets ==
ABC

June 4
7:30 pm

Recap

New Jersey Nets 89, San Antonio Spurs 101
Scoring by quarter: 21–18, 21–24, 17–32, 30–27
Pts: Kenyon Martin 21; Rebs: Kenyon Martin 12; Asts: Jason Kidd 10	Pts: Tim Duncan 32; Rebs: Tim Duncan 20; Asts: Tim Duncan 6
San Antonio leads series, 1–0

SBC Center, San Antonio, Texas
Attendance: 18,797
Referees: Dick Bavetta, Joe Crawford, Joe DeRosa

ABC

June 6
7:30 pm

Recap

New Jersey Nets 87, San Antonio Spurs 85
Scoring by quarter: 19–18, 22–17, 25–21, 21–29
Pts: Jason Kidd 30; Rebs: Jason Kidd 7 Asts: Kenyon Martin 4	Pts: Tony Parker 21; Rebs: Tim Duncan 12; Asts: Tony Parker 5
Series tied, 1–1

SBC Center, San Antonio, Texas
Attendance: 18,797
Referees: Dan Crawford, Bob Delaney, Bennett Salvatore

ABC

June 8
8:30 pm

Recap

San Antonio Spurs 84, New Jersey Nets 79
Scoring by quarter: 15–21, 18–9, 21–27, 30–22
Pts: Tony Parker 26; Rebs: Tim Duncan 16; Asts: Tim Duncan 7	Pts: Kenyon Martin 23; Rebs: Kenyon Martin 11; Asts: Jason Kidd 11
San Antonio leads series, 2–1

Continental Airlines Arena, East Rutherford, New Jersey
Attendance: 19,280
Referees: Ron Garretson, Steve Javie, Jack Nies

ABC

June 11
8:30 pm

Recap

San Antonio Spurs 76, New Jersey Nets 77
Scoring by quarter: 18–16, 16–29, 23–11, 19–21
Pts: Tim Duncan 23; Rebs: Tim Duncan 16; Asts: Parker, Jackson 3 each	Pts: Kenyon Martin 20; Rebs: Kenyon Martin 13; Asts: Jason Kidd 9
Series tied, 2–2

Continental Airlines Arena, East Rutherford, New Jersey
Attendance: 19,280
Referees: Mike Callahan, Bernie Fryer, Eddie F. Rush

ABC

June 13
8:30 pm

Recap

San Antonio Spurs 93, New Jersey Nets 83
Scoring by quarter: 19–18, 23–16, 24–23, 27–26
Pts: Tim Duncan 29; Rebs: Tim Duncan 17; Asts: Duncan, Parker 4 each	Pts: Jason Kidd 29; Rebs: Kenyon Martin 9 Asts: Jason Kidd 7
San Antonio leads series, 3–2

Continental Airlines Arena, East Rutherford, New Jersey
Attendance: 19,280
Referees: Dick Bavetta, Joe Crawford, Bennett Salvatore

ABC

June 15
7:30 pm

Recap

New Jersey Nets 77, San Antonio Spurs 88
Scoring by quarter: 25–17, 16–21, 22–19, 14–31
Pts: Jason Kidd 21; Rebs: Kenyon Martin 10; Asts: Jason Kidd 7	Pts: Tim Duncan 21; Rebs: Tim Duncan 20; Asts: Tim Duncan 10
San Antonio wins series, 4–2

SBC Center, San Antonio, Texas
Attendance: 18,797
Referees: Dan Crawford, Bob Delaney, Ron Garretson

- Game 6 is David Robinson's final NBA game.

The Spurs become the first team to win all playoff series in 6 games.

Regular-season series
Tied 1–1 in the regular-season series

November 13, 2002

Recap

San Antonio Spurs 82, New Jersey Nets 91

Continental Airlines Arena, East Rutherford, New Jersey

March 6, 2003

Recap

New Jersey Nets 78, San Antonio Spurs 92

SBC Center, San Antonio, Texas

This was the first NBA playoff meeting between the Nets and the Spurs. As members of the ABA, both teams met in the 1976 ABA Semifinals, where the Nets won 4–3.

== Statistical leaders ==
Category	Game high			Average			
Category	Player	Team	High	Player	Team	Avg.	GP
Points	Allen Iverson	Philadelphia 76ers	55	Kobe Bryant	Los Angeles Lakers	32.1	12
Rebounds	Tim Duncan; Ben Wallace	San Antonio Spurs; Detroit Pistons	24	Jermaine O'Neal	Indiana Pacers	17.5	6
Assists	Gary Payton; Jason Kidd	Milwaukee Bucks; New Jersey Nets	14	Gary Payton	Milwaukee Bucks	8.7	6
Steals	Ben Wallace	Detroit Pistons	7	Ben Wallace	Detroit Pistons	2.5	17
Blocks	Tim Duncan	San Antonio Spurs	8	Tim Duncan	San Antonio Spurs	3.3	24
