= Trent Tucker Rule =

Rule in basketball

The Trent Tucker Rule is a basketball rule that disallows any regular shot to be taken on the court if the ball is put into play with under 0.3 seconds left in game or shot clock. The rule was adopted in the 1990–91 NBA season and named after New York Knicks player Trent Tucker, and officially adopted in FIBA play starting in 2010. When the WNBA was established in 1997, this rule was adopted too.

== Rule ==
Named after New York Knicks player Trent Tucker, the Trent Tucker Rule is a basketball rule that disallows any regular shot to be taken on the court if the ball is put into play with under 0.3 seconds left in game or shot clock. The Official Rules of the National Basketball Association state

NO LESS THAN :00.3 must expire on the game clock and shot clock when a ball is thrown inbounds and then hit instantly out-of-bounds. If under :00.3 expires in such a situation, the timer will be instructed to deduct AT LEAST :00.3 from the game clock and shot clock. If, in the judgment of the official, the play took longer than :00.3, he will instruct the timer to deduct more time. If under :00.3 remain on the game clock when this situation occurs, the period is over. If under 0.3 remain on the shot clock when this situation occurs, a shot clock violation is called.

The game clock and shot clock must show at least .3 in order for a player to secure possession of the ball on a rebound or throw-in to attempt a field goal. Instant replay shall be utilized if the basket is successful on this type of play and the game clock runs to 0.0 or the shot clock expires on a made basket and the officials are not reasonably certain that the ball was released prior to the expiration of the shot clock. The only type of field goal which may be scored if the game clock and/or shot clock are at 0.2 or 0.1 is a "tip-in" (Note: Per the Official Rules of the National Basketball Association, '"tip-in" is defined as any action in which the ball is deflected, not controlled, by a player and then enters the basket ring.') or "high lob". (Note: Per the Official Rules of the National Basketball Association, '"high lob" is defined as a pass which is tipped by an offensive player while in mid-air, and is followed instantaneously by a field goal attempt.')

Article 16.2.5 of the 2010 FIBA Official Rules states:

The game clock must indicate 0.3 (three tenths of a second) or more for a player to gain control of the ball on a throw-in or on a rebound after the last or only free throw in order to attempt a shot for a field goal. If the game clock indicates 0.2 or 0.1 the only type of a valid field goal made is by tapping or directly dunking the ball.

== Incident ==
Chicago Bulls	New York Knicks
106	109
	1	2	3	4	Total
Chicago Bulls	29	28	25	24	106
New York Knicks	28	37	23	21	109
- Date: January 15, 1990
- Venue: Madison Square Garden, New York City, New York
- Referees: Woody Mayfield; Paul Mihalak; Ronnie Nunn
- Attendance: 18,212

The rule was born out of a game between the Knicks and the Chicago Bulls on January 15, 1990, at Madison Square Garden. The game was tied at 106 with one-tenth of a second left in regulation and the Knicks in possession. During a time-out called by the Knicks, both teams prepared for what was seen as the only possible way the Knicks could win in regulation: an alley oop tap-in from out of bounds by Patrick Ewing.

When play resumed, the Knicks player throwing the ball in, Mark Jackson, saw the alley-oop play get broken up. He proceeded to throw the ball inbounds to Tucker, who was the only player open. Tucker then caught the pass in mid-air, turned, landed, and shot a three-point jump shot before the buzzer, giving the Knicks the win: 109–106. Replays showed that the clock was not started until Tucker's shot was already in mid-air and coming down towards the basket.

=== Protest ===
The Bulls, led by first-year head coach Phil Jackson, a former Knicks player and later executive, later filed an official protest with the NBA about the play. By their estimate, the play took closer to 0.4 seconds. However, timekeeper Bob Billings and referee Ronnie Nunn, who were working that game, claimed everything went perfectly fine. The protest was disallowed.

The NBA's vice president of operations, Rod Thorn, was the only NBA executive to side with the Bulls. (Incidentally, Thorn was once the general manager of the Bulls). Thorn argued that it was physically impossible for a player to receive an inbounds pass and release it for a shot in less than a tenth of a second. He pointed out that tests in European basketball leagues, which had counted down the final minute of a period in tenths of seconds for many years (the NBA had just adopted it for 1989–90), proved that a catch-and-shoot takes at least three tenths of a second.

== Rule implementation ==
=== NBA ===
Although the Bulls lost the protest, the dispute became the backbone for the time requirements of the new rule. Teams with the possession of the ball with less than 00.3 left also have the option of trying a Hail Mary shot like the one that the Knicks were going to try before Tucker's shot, or to simply let the clock run to zero.

At the start of the 1989–90 season, the NBA had adopted a rule from FIBA making game clocks register tenths of seconds in the final minute of a period. Madison Square Garden, like the majority of NBA venues at the time, used an American Sign & Indicator scoreboard and timing system. During the first weeks of the season, it was evident the manufacturer's scoreboards would have frequent calibration flaws with tenths in the final minute. In some cases, the clock would be very inconsistent in timing tenths, while in other cases after calibration, the clock would actually "freeze" at one-tenth of a second before the "00.0" appeared, triggering the final horn.

Further changes in 1991 were designed to eliminate the problem with the AS&I units with a new directive for 1991–92 to add shot clocks with duplicate game time. At that point, most venues purchased new scoreboards from White Way Sign, Fair-Play, or Daktronics, because of the calibration consistency of the new units.

Very few NBA teams purchased the AS&I (or later, Trans-Lux) units when the new rule was adopted in 1991. The last NBA arena to use the manufacturer's unit was the Charlotte Coliseum, which installed a successor Trans-Lux unit for the 2001–02 season (the Hornets' last in Charlotte, but the arena closed after the 2004–05 season, the Bobcats' inaugural season, after its replacement, the Spectrum Center, opened (with a new Daktronics unit). By 2011, all NBA venues used either a Daktronics or OES system.

In 2002, the NBA instituted new rules regarding the end of period indicators. An LED light strip on the backboard and the scorer's table replaced the traditional electric red light behind the backboard, and a shot clock visible to all three viewable sides was mandated.

Venues using Daktronics units installed new four-sided shot clocks with red indicator lights on the sides of the shot time to further assist the electric light. By 2004, shot clocks were available with a perimeter light strip around the clock that also lit up when the clock read "00.0". Today, see-through shot clock units have light strips that surround the shot clock to turn on upon the clock registering 0.0.

In the late 1990s, NBA timekeeping rules changed with the implementation of a system where the blowing of an official's whistle stops the clock at the instant of the whistle, along with a rule change where the on-court official (not an official at the scorer's table) starts the clock by pressing a button attached to the official's belt.

On December 20, 2006, New York Knicks forward David Lee scored a game-winning basket with only 0.1 left on the clock. The shot counted because Lee deflected in the inbounds pass into the basket (just like what was foreseen by the Knicks and Bulls in their game years before). This was the first occurrence of a team winning an NBA game with 0.1 left since Trent Tucker, and coincidentally from the same team. Also by chance, Michael Jordan, Charles Oakley and Patrick Ewing—all of whom participated in the original Trent Tucker game—were in attendance at the David Lee game in Madison Square Garden.

The NBA in 2016 adopted an official timekeeper sponsorship with Tissot, which had the aim of unifying all game timekeeping tasks, with the official clock connected to the scoreboard system and shot clocks all being manufactured by the company. All NBA venues since now utilize identical Tissot timekeeping systems.

=== Other organizations ===
When the WNBA was established in 1997, the Trent Tucker rule was adopted.

In 2004, FIBA adopted a rule where the system would be mandatory in international competitions. In 2010, FIBA instituted Article 16.2.5 to officially institute the Trent Tucker Rule in international basketball.

Another example of this rule being invoked occurred at the end of a game between the University of South Florida and Florida Gulf Coast University on December 17, 2013, when FGCU appeared to tie the game at 68 on a Chase Fieler shot off a full-court inbounds pass with 0.3 seconds remaining in double overtime. Replays showed that Fieler got the shot off before the 0.3 expired, but the equivalent NCAA rule (Rule 5, Section 18, Article 1) was invoked to waive the Fieler basket, giving USF the win. However, under the FIBA and NBA interpretation, the restrictions only apply to 0.2 or 0.1, as the ball was put in play at 0.3.

3x3 basketball also has the Trent Tucker rule.

== See also ==
- Bulls–Knicks rivalry
- Phantom Buzzer Game
- The Shot
