= NBA referee travel expense scandal =

1994 sports controversy

An Internal Revenue Service investigation nicknamed Operation Slam Dunk began in 1994 surrounding untaxed income of at least 43 National Basketball Association referees regarding downgraded first-class or full-fare coach plane tickets that were paid for by the NBA with the cost difference being pocketed by the referees without reporting that income on their tax returns.

== Background ==
In 1994, the National Basketball Association employed 54 referees. Each made between $72,000 and $177,000 a year, working about 70 to 75 games a year. The travel expenses for referees were to be reimbursed by the NBA once a travel report was submitted. The NBA paid for a first class airline ticket for flights lasting longer than two hours and a full fare coach seat on flights shorter than two hours. In turn, the referees were permitted to downgrade their first class tickets and pocket the cost difference. This was considered a fringe benefit of the position and a way to supplement their income. The NBA did not withhold taxes on this income or report it to the IRS and the referees did not declare this income on their tax returns considering it a fringe benefit provided by their employer.

In 1989, the IRS introduced new regulations that required an arrangement like the fringe benefits supported by the NBA to be reported as income. However, during the introduction of these new regulations, the NBA and the referees association were locked in a bargaining period over a new contract. During the negotiations the NBA changed the rules frequently which resulted in an unclear process on how to report the income causing many referees to continue the fringe benefits as they had in the past.

== Investigation ==
In 1993 the IRS received a tip that the referees were not declaring the airline ticket money as income resulting in the IRS launching "Operation Slam Dunk." On September 12, 1994, the IRS announced its investigation and notified more than 50 referees that they were part of a criminal tax investigation. The estimates of cash received ranged from $8,000 to $100,000.

Over the next four years, the cases grew and dragged on resulting in 25 referees being turned over to the IRS civil division to be audited. Although the amount of lost tax revenue did not reach the IRS guidelines for criminal prosecution, the United States Department of Justice still decided to indict 12 referees.

== Aftermath ==
11 of the 12 indicted referees in 1998 pleaded guilty with only Steve Javie taking the case to trial and successfully being acquitted. More referees would become involved with a total of 43 choosing to plea bargain. The only additional referee to take his case to trial would be Ken Mauer, later found guilty. All of the referees involved were forced to resign from the NBA but were subsequently rehired after their guilty pleas.

=== Notable consequences ===
Jesse Ray Kersey pled guilty in 1997 and was sentenced to three years probation, ordered to pay a $20,000 fine, and file accurate amended tax returns and pay all taxes, interest, and penalties owed.

George T. Tolliver pleaded guilty to one count of filing a false tax return and was confined to six months of home detention, placed on probation for two years, ordered to completed 100 hours of community service and pay a $10,000 fine.

Steve Javie was the only one to take his case to trial out of the original 12 indicted referees and was subsequently acquitted more than four years after the investigation began. Javie argued that he didn't owe taxes on more than $84,000 in income over three years because the money was value-earned from frequent flyer miles, which are non-taxable. The IRS case was cross-examined and put under much scrutiny when asked why only some of the referees involved were indicted and questioning inconsistencies in arithmetic submitted as evidence by the IRS.

Ken Mauer was the only referee to be found guilty when he refused to accept a plea bargain. Mauer was convicted of a felony, three counts of tax evasion and one count of obstruction of justice. He was confined to house arrest for five months, three years of supervised release, and 800 hours of community service. After the sentence Mauer remarked, "I'm not saying a mistake wasn't made. I'm not saying I've never made a mistake. But I never intended to commit a criminal act. I stood up for what I believe in. That is the only way I know how to live my life." After the punishment was served, Mauer was reinstated as an NBA referee.
