= Steve Javie =

American basketball referee (born 1955)

Deacon Steve Javie
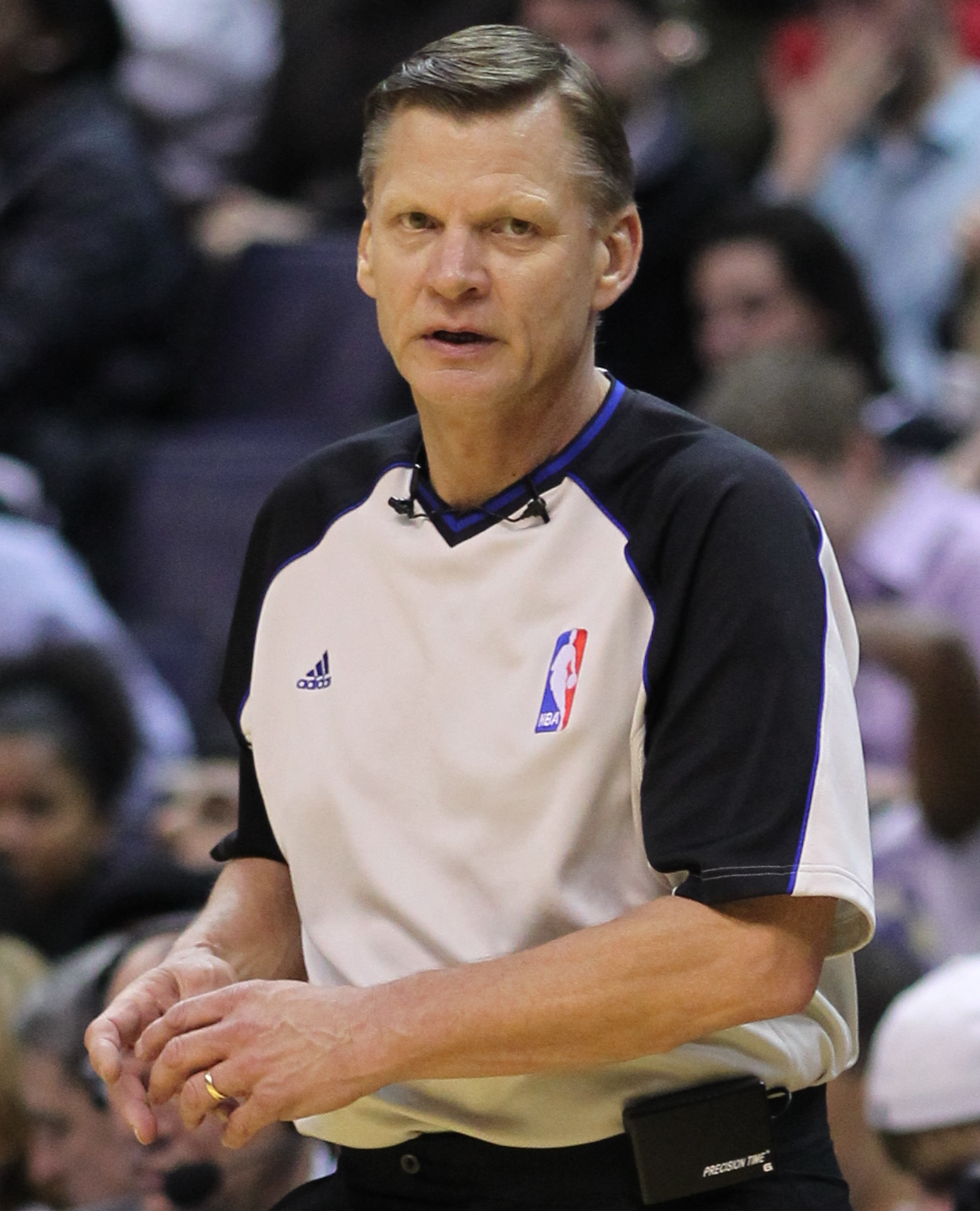
- Javie in 2011
- Born: January 17, 1955 (age 71); Philadelphia, Pennsylvania, U.S.
- Education: Temple University (Bachelor's degree, 1976)
- Spouse: Mary-ellen
- Parent(s): Stan and Stella
- Basketball career
- Position: NBA referee
- Officiating career: 1986–2011

Steve Javie (/ˈstiːvˈdʒæviː/; born January 17, 1955) is an American retired professional basketball referee who is currently an analyst with ESPN and a Catholic permanent deacon. He refereed in the National Basketball Association (NBA) from the 1986–87 NBA season to the 2010–11 season, officiating 1,514 regular season, 243 playoff, and 23 NBA Finals games (a total of 1,780 games); he is one of few NBA referees to officiate 1,000 games. According to Referee magazine, Javie was a highly regarded referee in the NBA, and he was respected within the officiating community for his game management skills. He was also notable during his NBA officiating career for his quickness in assessing technical fouls.

Prior to his NBA career, he played and graduated from La Salle College High School. He later played baseball for Temple University from 1974 to 1976 and later was an umpire in the Florida State League (Class-A) from 1978 to 1981. Transitioning to basketball, he officiated in the Continental Basketball Association (CBA) from 1981 to 1986.

== Personal ==
=== Early life ===
Steve Javie was born on January 17, 1955, in Philadelphia, Pennsylvania, to Stan and Stella Javie. During his childhood, he attended and later graduated from La Salle College High School in Philadelphia, Pennsylvania, where he played baseball, football, and basketball, earning All-League honors in baseball and basketball. Following high school, he continued a baseball career at Temple University. He graduated from the university in 1976 with a bachelor's degree in business administration. As a prospect in baseball, Javie signed with the Baltimore Orioles minor league organization. He was released from the Orioles minor league system (Class-A) after one year due to an arm injury suffered as a pitcher.

=== Family ===
Steve Javie's father, Stan Javie, was also a sports official. Stan Javie worked in the National Football League from 1951 to 1980 as a field judge and back judge, and was assigned to officiate four Super Bowls. In an interview with Referee magazine, Steve Javie described his father as "a guy you'd go to war with. He had a passion. He was probably the official that everyone strives to be, but can't, because you have to be yourself. I can't be a Stan Javie and you can't be, but if you took all the characteristics and makeup, you'd want to be that kind of official." His godfather, Johnny Stevens, was an American League umpire and worked four World Series in a career that spanned from 1948 to 1975.

Javie resides in Blue Bell, Pennsylvania. He is married to Mary-ellen, whom he met in 1990 at the Philadelphia International Airport, where she was employed. The couple was married in August 1991.

=== Charity ===
Along with his wife, Steve Javie started the Javie Foundation for Charity to raise money for the homeless, disabled, abused and neglected children. He hosts an annual fundraising golf tournament to support a variety of causes in the Philadelphia metropolitan area. The two-day event, which also includes a dinner, dance, and silent auction, has raised US$1 million since its inception.

In 2007, he participated in a summer clinic at Don Guanella High School in Springfield, Pennsylvania, along with four other NBA officials, teaching developmentally delayed boys the rules of basketball and how to signal violations.

== Baseball umpire ==
After his baseball playing career was over at age 22, Javie began working at Johnson & Johnson in their baby products line. Becoming uninterested in his job at Johnson & Johnson, he decided to pursue an occupation within sports, and became a baseball umpire in 1978. Having no prior experience as an arbiter, Javie attended an umpire school operated by Major League Baseball (MLB) umpire Bill Kinnamon. Upon completion of training, he was selected to work in the Florida State League. Looking to be promoted to the Class-AA Eastern League, he was denied entrance into the league due to scheduling conflicts and later a players' strike. In June 1981, after two and a half years in the Florida State League, Javie left the organization over disagreements with executives due to the lack of promotion opportunities, and being forced to split from an experienced umpire crew that included Jerry Layne, who later worked in the major leagues.

== Basketball referee ==
=== CBA career ===
While serving as an umpire, Javie had officiated basketball games at the high school level in Pennsylvania during the baseball off-season. In addition, he was invited to NBA camps for prospective officials. Within a week of return home following the end of his umpiring career, Javie contacted his father's friend, NBA referee Earl Strom, who assisted Javie in reaching then-CBA supervisor Cecil Watkins about the possibility of working in the CBA. After officiating games in Philadelphia's Baker League, he was hired by the CBA in the fall of 1981. He arrived to the CBA with a "baseball mentality" and had to make quick decisions on the court because of the league's reputation for fighting among players and arguing by coaches. During a game at The Armory in Albany, New York, Javie was chased down a staircase by then-Albany Patroons coach Phil Jackson, who had received a technical foul. He worked CBA games for five years before being hired by the NBA in 1986.

=== NBA career ===
==== Early years ====
Upon arriving in the NBA, Javie developed a reputation early for having a "quick trigger finger", and he was believed to be one of the league leaders in calling technical fouls during the late 1980s and early 1990s. Reflecting on his early years in the league, Javie told Sports Illustrated in October 2000, "I'd get so mad I'd lose control for two or three minutes, and that's when I would miss calls." Javie developed mentorships with referees Joe Crawford and Jack Madden to assist in the maturation process. Working his debut game with Crawford at the Pontiac Silverdome in Detroit, Michigan, Javie received a grade of 40 points out of 100 by supervisor Darell Garretson. While reviewing game film later at the hotel, Crawford noted errors made throughout the game by himself. As a result of this film study, Javie learned that experienced officials make mistakes and admitting error will improve a referee's ability in the long-term. Ninety minutes after the conclusion of a game, Javie reviews game film. In addition to film review, Madden taught Javie not to lose focus when players and coaches were upset, and to walk away from them rather than becoming angry. Javie credited his mentors for success as a referee saying, "My mentors have made me what I am today. I'm a little part of each of them. It's their success in teaching me."

Javie had an on-court incident during the 1990–91 NBA season in a game between the Portland Trail Blazers and Washington Bullets. Bullets' forward Pervis Ellison threw the ball at referee Billy Spooner prompting Javie to run across the court to impose a technical foul on Ellison. In the sequence of events that followed, Javie ejected Ellison after protesting the call, the Bullets' head coach Wes Unseld for protesting the dismissal of Ellison, and the Bullets' mascot, "Hoops", for making gestures to incite the crowd. Rod Thorn, then the NBA's vice president for operations, ruled that Javie overreacted in ejecting Ellison and would be subject to discipline. The extent of the disciplinary action was not disclosed. Javie reflected on the experience saying, "My fatal mistake was getting involved with Billy [Spooner] and Pervis [Ellison] in the first place. You have to be there for your partners, but most of the time you've got to let them call their game."

Nearly three years later in another game involving the Portland Trail Blazers, Trail Blazers radio broadcast analyst Mike Rice was ejected by Javie for disputing calls from his broadcast position.

During the 2002–03 NBA season, Javie was fined $1,000 by the league for a verbal altercation with Pat Riley, then-head coach of the Miami Heat.

In April 2003, Javie was the referee in Michael Jordan's final game of his fifteen-year NBA career. During a game break towards the end of regulation, Javie congratulated Jordan on his career and told him he was a "class act". Javie then turned around and told the younger players on the court, "You could do a lot worse than modeling yourselves after this guy."

==== Income tax evasion trial ====
In January 1999, Javie was the only one of fifteen referees to be acquitted of tax evasion charges as a result of not reporting income he received by downgrading airline tickets provided by the league. Other referees were sentenced to probation or a period of house arrest, and ordered to pay the taxes. He fought the charges because he believed he did not intentionally do anything wrong. Discussing the trial, Javie told Referee magazine, "My job is about my name. My dad taught me your name is the most important thing. I had to fight for my name." During the trial, Javie argued that he didn't owe taxes on more than $84,000 in income over three years because the money was value-earned from frequent flyer miles, which are non-taxable. He later described the trial as "the hardest two weeks" of his life.

==== Retirement ====
Javie announced his retirement before the beginning of the 2011–12 season.

On June 22, 2017, Javie was one of four new inductees into the National Polish-American Sports Hall of Fame in Troy, Michigan. He was the recipient of Sports Faith International's Father Smyth Award on May 22, 2021.

He is a permanent deacon in the Catholic Church.

=== Media career ===
In June 2012, it was announced that Javie would join NBA on ESPN, serving as a rules analyst working marquee games during the season and throughout the NBA Playoffs. Javie also appears on ESPN programming to discuss controversial referee occurrences.
