= Joey Crawford =

American basketball referee (born 1951)

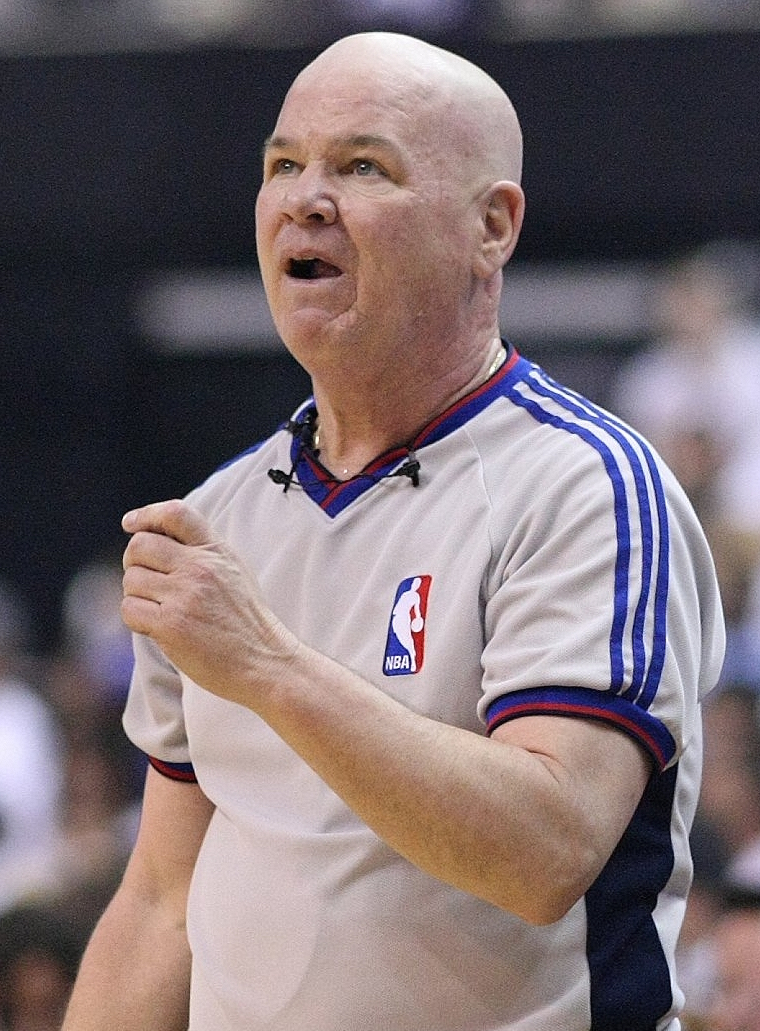
- Crawford in 2008
- Born: August 30, 1951 (age 75); Havertown, Pennsylvania, U.S.
- Education: Cardinal O'Hara High School
- Occupation: Referee (NBA)
- Spouse: Mary Crawford (m. 1971)
- Children: 3
- Parent(s): Shag Crawford; Vivian Crawford
- Basketball career

Career information
- Position: NBA referee
- Officiating career: 1977–2016
- Basketball Hall of Fame

Joseph Crawford (born August 30, 1951, in Havertown, Pennsylvania) is an American retired professional basketball referee who worked in the National Basketball Association (NBA) between 1977 and 2016. Crawford, who wore uniform number 17, was regarded as one of the most punitive and controversial officials in the NBA and developed a reputation for assessing technical fouls against both players and coaches. As of the conclusion of the 2014–15 NBA season, Crawford had worked more playoff (313) and NBA Finals games (50) than any other active referee in the league. He officiated in every NBA Finals series from 1986 to 2015, only missing 2007 due to suspension. In addition to playoff games, Crawford officiated the NBA All-Star Game in 1986, 1992 and 2000.

== Early career ==
Crawford officiated high school games in Pennsylvania for eight years from 1970 to 1977 and the Eastern Basketball Association (later the Continental Basketball Association, or CBA) in 1974 and 1977. Following his work in the CBA, Crawford was hired by the NBA in 1977 at the age of 26.

== NBA referee career ==
=== Airline ticket income investigation ===
In 1998, Crawford was one of eight NBA referees charged with filing false income tax returns after an Internal Revenue Service investigation found that cash was being pocketed by referees when airline tickets provided by the league were downgraded. At the conclusion of a four-year investigation, Crawford pleaded guilty on July 1, 1998 to falsely stating income of $82,500 from 1991 to 1993 and resigned from the NBA, effective immediately. He was reinstated by NBA commissioner David Stern in 1999 and did not miss a game due to the players' lockout that preceded the 1998–99 NBA season.

=== Games officiated milestone ===
Crawford officiated his 2,000th NBA game between the Los Angeles Lakers and Philadelphia 76ers on November 11, 2005. He was the sixth NBA referee in history to reach 2,000 games, joining Mendy Rudolph, Jake O'Donnell, Dick Bavetta, Earl Strom, and Tommy Nuñez.

=== Tim Duncan incident ===
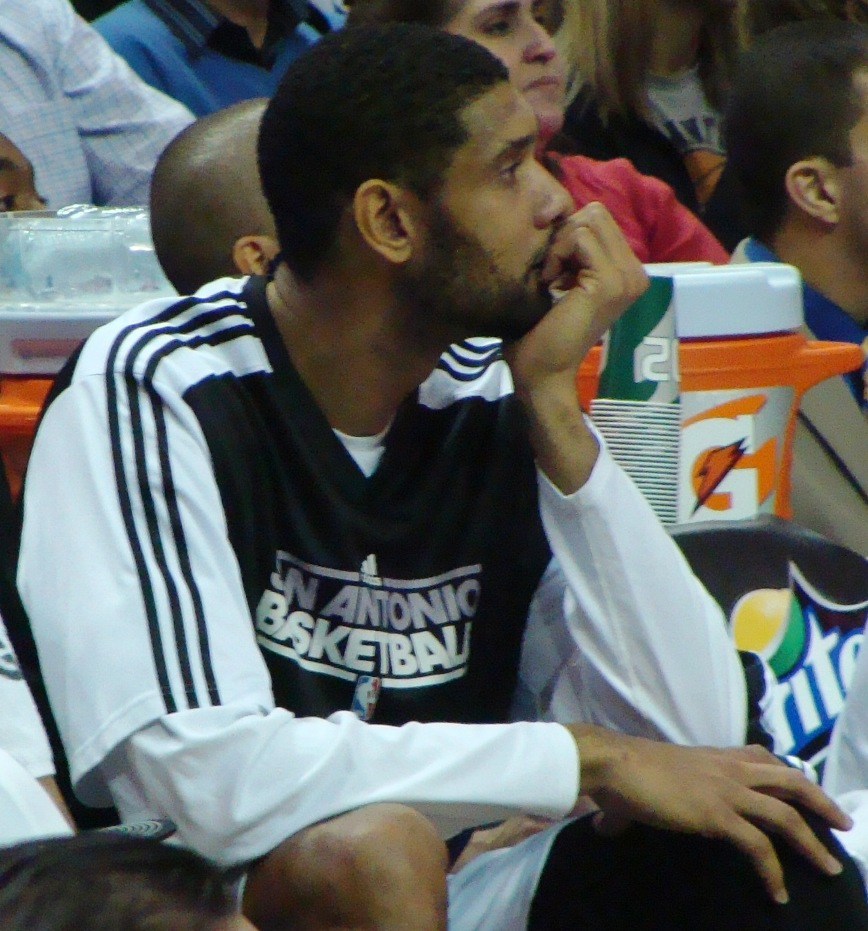
Tim Duncan was ejected from a 2007 game after Crawford gave him two technical fouls, both while on the bench.

On April 15, 2007, Crawford ejected San Antonio Spurs player Tim Duncan during a game against the Dallas Mavericks. Duncan had been sitting on the bench when Crawford assessed two technical fouls. Crawford said that Duncan had been laughing at him and insulted him with an expletive, while Duncan said that Crawford asked him if he wanted to fight. On April 17, Crawford was fined $100,000 and suspended for the remainder of the 2006–07 season and the 2007 playoffs, ending his streak of officiating 21 consecutive NBA Finals. The league also fined Duncan $25,000 for verbal abuse of an official and warned that a repeat incident in the future would result in an ejection. Commissioner David Stern said Crawford's actions "failed to meet the standards of professionalism and game management we expect of NBA referees."

Crawford met with league officials on July 30. On September 17, the NBA announced Crawford's reinstatement. Commissioner Stern said, "Based on my meeting with Joey Crawford, his commitment to an ongoing counseling program and a favorable professional evaluation that was performed at my direction, I am satisfied that Joey understands the standards of game management and professionalism the NBA expects from him and that he will be able to conduct himself in accordance with those standards."

In a 2012 interview, Crawford named the Duncan incident as one of his two regrets from his career, saying "The Duncan thing probably changed my life. It was just—you come to the realization that maybe the way you've been doing things is not the proper way and you have to regroup, not only on the court but off the court. I had seen a sports psychologist before that. But after, I saw him a lot more. [...] It gave me a new perspective."

=== Retirement ===
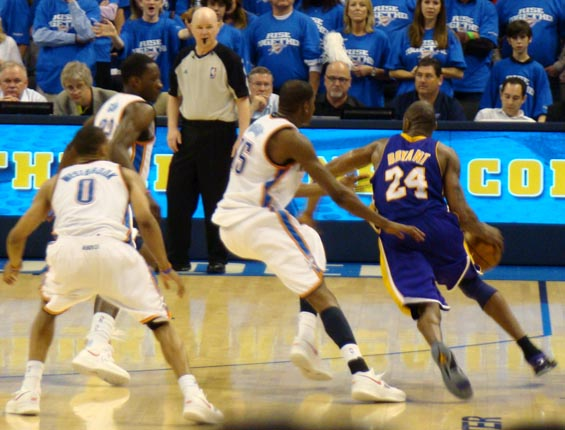
Crawford (above) officiating during the first-round series between the Los Angeles Lakers and the Oklahoma City Thunder in the 2010 NBA playoffs

On January 2, 2016, Crawford announced that the 2015–2016 NBA season would be his last. A nagging knee injury prevented him from officiating much of the season. Crawford briefly returned in March, but on March 10, 2016, Crawford announced his retirement effective immediately, due to medical issues. Over his 39-year career, he officiated 2,561 regular-season games, 374 playoff games, and 50 NBA Finals games. The 374 playoff games is a record high for any NBA referee.

== Legacy ==
Crawford will be inducted into the Naismith Basketball Hall of Fame as part of the Class of 2026. As a referee in the NBA he ranks second all-time in games officiated (2,561), first in playoff games officiated (374) and first in NBA Finals games officiated (50).

== Personal life ==
Crawford is the son of Vivian Crawford and Shag Crawford. Crawford's father, Shag, was a Major League Baseball umpire in the National League from 1956 to 1975 and his brother, Jerry, was a major league umpire from 1976 through 2010.

Crawford currently resides in Newtown Square, Pennsylvania. From 1965 to 1969 Crawford attended Cardinal O'Hara High School, the same high school as fellow NBA referees Mike Callahan, Ed Malloy, and Tim Donaghy.

He married Mary Crawford in 1971 and had three children and ten grandchildren. Crawford's son-in-law, Chris Day, is the former head women's basketball coach at Vermont.
