= Hue Hollins =

American basketball referee (1940–2013)

Hue Spencer Hollins Sr. (November 28, 1940 – July 4, 2013) was an American professional basketball referee for the National Basketball Association (NBA). During his 27-year career in the NBA, Hollins officiated 19 NBA Finals games and five NBA All-Star Games. He is notable for working the Finals every year during the 1990s and for a notorious call during a 1994 NBA Playoffs game between the Chicago Bulls and New York Knicks. Hollins was probed by the Federal Bureau of Investigation (FBI) over the 2007 NBA betting scandal involving former referee Tim Donaghy.

== Personal ==
=== Early life ===
Hollins grew up in Waco, Texas. He was involved in sports, playing basketball and baseball throughout his childhood, while focusing on baseball during high school. Following high school, Hollins was offered a contract to join the Pittsburgh Pirates organization, but declined and opted to join the military. Spending four years in the United States Navy, Hollins enrolled at California State University, Dominguez Hills. He graduated from the school with a double major in sociology and psychology and was later hired as a high school counselor.

== Officiating career ==
=== 1994 NBA Playoffs ===
Hollins was one of the referees assigned to officiate Game 5 of the 1994 NBA Playoffs series between the Chicago Bulls and New York Knicks; the resulting incident was described as the most controversial moment of Hollins' career by Referee magazine. With 2.1 seconds left in the fourth quarter, the Knicks' Hubert Davis attempted a 2-point shot which was contested by the Bulls' Scottie Pippen. Pippen was called for a personal foul by Hollins, who determined that Pippen made contact with Davis. Television replays indicated that contact was made after Davis had released the ball. Davis successfully made both free throw attempts to assist in the Knicks' 87–86 victory, and gave his team a three to two games advantage in the series.

Hollins defended the call after the game saying, "I saw Scottie make contact with his shooting motion. I'm positive there was contact on the shot." Darell Garretson, the league's supervisor of officials and who also officiated in the league, agreed with Hollins and issued a statement, "The perception is that referees should put their whistles in their pockets in the last minutes. But it all comes down to what is sufficient contact. There's an old, old adage that refs don't make those calls in the last seconds. Obviously, you hope you don't make a call that will decide a game. But the call was within the context of how we had been calling them all game." Garretson later changed his stance of the call the next season. Speaking to a Chicago Tribune reporter, Garretson described Hollins' call as "terrible". Chicago head coach Phil Jackson, upset over the outcome of the game, was fined US$10,000 for comparing the loss to the gold medal game controversy at the 1972 Summer Olympics.

The Knicks went on to win the Bulls-Knicks series in seven games, and proceeded all the way to the NBA Finals, where they lost to the Houston Rockets, also in seven games.
