= Bob Delaney (basketball) =

American basketball referee (born 1951)

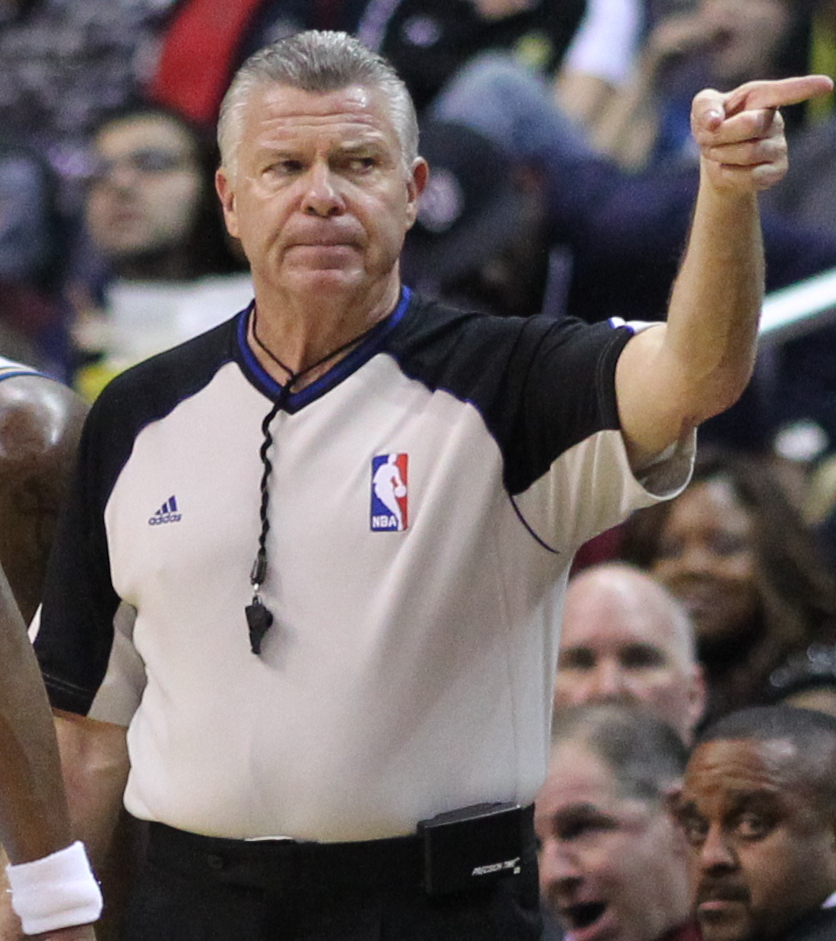
- Born: November 1, 1951 (age 74); Paterson, New Jersey, U.S.
- Education: Saint Mary's College of California (Master of Arts, 2010); New Jersey City University (Bachelor's degree, 1973)
- Occupations: NBA referee Retired New Jersey State Police state trooper

Robert J. Delaney (born November 1, 1951) is a former undercover New Jersey state trooper and professional basketball referee in the National Basketball Association (NBA) who officiated from the 1987–88 NBA season up until the 2010–11 NBA season. He officiated more than 1,500 regular season games, 200 playoff games, nine NBA Finals, and was assigned to the 1998 and 2011 NBA NBA All-Star Game. He wore the uniform number 26.

Delaney is a 1985 graduate of New Jersey City University with a Bachelor of Science degree in criminology. He is a 2006 inductee into NJCU's Athletics Hall of Fame. After finishing college, Delaney joined the New Jersey State Police. During the mid-1970s, Delaney worked as an undercover officer as part of an operation known as "Project Alpha".

While serving as a police officer, Delaney was also a high school basketball referee in New Jersey from 1972 to 1982 and later officiated in the Continental Basketball Association (CBA) for four years before being selected by scouts to officiate in the NBA, beginning in 1987.

In the early 1980s, Delaney retired as a law enforcement officer and devoted full-time to becoming a basketball referee. In 2008, he wrote about his undercover experience in Covert: My Years Infiltrating the Mob, with co-author Dave Scheiber. He completed a Master of Arts degree in leadership from Saint Mary's College of California.

In August 2018, Delaney was given the newly created position of Special Advisor for Officiating Development and Performance by the Southeastern Conference. He will serve as a consultant to the officiating coordinators in each of the college conference's sports, as well as assist the men's and women's coordinators of basketball officials with training, development, and evaluation.

On January 22, 2020, Delaney received the Theodore Roosevelt Award, the highest honor accorded by the NCAA.

In September 2021, Delaney joined the advisory board of the international organization Awareness 360.

== Awards and Recognitions ==
Delaney has received several awards and honors for his contributions to law enforcement, sports officiating, and military resilience programs. In 2011, he was presented with the U.S. Army Outstanding Civilian Service Medal by General Robert Cone for his ongoing post-trauma and resilience work with troops at Fort Hood. He received the same honor again in 2012 from General Raymond Odierno in recognition of his outreach and support for U.S. troops in Afghanistan and Iraq. He is also a recipient of the Naismith Memorial Basketball Hall of Fame Mannie Jackson Human Spirit Award (2014), the New Jersey Bar Association’s Colonel “Sandy” Award (2025), and the New Jersey Crime Investigators Lifetime Achievement Award (2025). In 2025, Delaney was presented with the United States Special Operations Command Medal by General Bryan Fenton for his ongoing contributions to Special Operations Force members and their families. In 2026, Delaney was inducted into the Irish American Hall of Fame in Chicago.
