= Greg Willard =

American basketball referee

- Born: November 5, 1958; Pasadena, California, U.S.
- Died: April 1, 2013 (aged 54); Huntington Beach, California, U.S.
- Education: Long Beach State, Orange Coast College
- Occupation: Referee (NBA)
- Spouse: Laurie (m. 1990)
- Children: 3

James Greg Willard (November 5, 1958 – April 1, 2013) was an American professional basketball referee in the National Basketball Association (NBA) since 1988 and wore the uniform number 57. Willard officiated 1,515 regular season, 134 playoff, and three NBA Finals games.

== Early career ==
While attending Long Beach State University, Willard officiated football as a member of the Orange County Football Officials Association and worked as a high school basketball official before advancing to the Continental Basketball Association where he spent four years. Willard also spent four years officiating basketball in college's PCAA (now Big West) and Pac-10 (now Pac-12) conferences. Willard earned his Associate of Arts degree from Orange Coast College.

== NBA referee career ==
As the NBA moved from a referee alignment of utilizing two-person officiating crews to that of a three-person crew in 1988, the League recruited top college and CBA officials to fill the new vacancies created by the officiating department's expansion, including Willard. The League previously experimented with three person mechanics during the 1978–79 NBA season when officials went on strike in protest of the move. Willard officiated his 1,500th career regular season game during the 2011–12 NBA season.

== Personal life ==
Since joining the NBA, Willard remained active with the Orange County Football Officials Associations as well as the Musical Youth Artist Repertory Theatre. He was a married father of three and was active in coaching local youth sports leagues. Willard resided in Huntington Beach, California.

=== Cancer ===
After working 10 games during the 2012 NBA Playoffs, Willard withdrew from his June 6, 2012 assignment, Game 6 of the Western Conference Finals between the San Antonio Spurs and Oklahoma City Thunder, after being diagnosed as having pancreatic cancer. It was his last assignment of the 2011–12 season. NBA officials working the 2012 NBA Finals wore a #57 patch on their jerseys to recognize Willard.

Willard worked one game during the 2012–13 pre-season, a Utah Jazz vs. Los Angeles Lakers contest at the Honda Center in Anaheim, California. Willard took a leave of absence during the 2012–13 season in order to continue receiving treatment.

On October 20, 2012, the Pancreatic Cancer Action Network ("PCAN") selected Willard as its Spirit of Hope Award recipient for displaying "tremendous courage and fortitude in coping with pancreatic cancer" and inspiring others to do the same. In honor of PCAN and Willard, NBA referees wore purple awareness bracelets during the 2012–13 NBA season. Additionally, Willard was named honoree of the March 24, 2013 event "Cheers to a Cure" with proceeds benefiting PCAN and cancer research endeavors.

Willard died on April 1, 2013, from pancreatic cancer. NBA officials wore a #57 patch on their jerseys for the remainder of the 2012–13 season in his honor.
