= Jake O'Donnell =

American basketball and baseball referee

- Born: January 25, 1937 (age 89); Philadelphia, Pennsylvania, United States
- Occupations: NBA referee (1967–1995); AL umpire (1968–1971)

James Michael "Jake" O'Donnell (born January 25, 1937, in Philadelphia) is a former sports official who worked as a National Basketball Association (NBA) referee for 28 seasons from 1967 to 1995, and also as an umpire in Major League Baseball for four seasons from 1968 to 1971. He is the only person to officiate All-Star games in both Major League Baseball and the NBA. At the time of his NBA retirement in 1995, he held the record for most regular season games officiated.

== Early life ==
O'Donnell was born on January 25, 1937, in Philadelphia. He was raised in an orphanage until he was 14. He then had a home with Charles and Dolores Scanlan, who became like parents to him, in Clifton Heights, Pennsylvania; a poor and tough mill town outside of Philadelphia. O'Donnell was given the nickname Jake by other teenagers on the playgrounds of Clifton Heights. It has been reported that he did not attend high school and obtained a General Educational Development diploma. In May 1971, O'Donnell described himself as having no formal education. He became involved in sale of electronic appliances in the early 1960s.

It has also been reported that O'Donnell graduated from North Catholic High School, commuting from his home in Clifton Heights; and that he attended Pennsylvania State University (Penn State) for one year. He was not on any sports team at either school, but developed an interest in officiating in the early 1960s, beginning with local Delaware County, Pennsylvania youth basketball leagues. He attended Lou Bonder's school for college basketball officials, but did not officiate in college basketball.

In 1962, at the suggestion of a friend, O'Donnell began umpiring baseball games for five dollars a game. In 1963, he started umpiring for Len Heller in local softball and baseball games, and used his savings to enter Al Somers umpiring school in Daytona Beach, Florida in 1964. He graduated second among 84 students in the six-week program, and received a job umpiring in the Single-A New York-Pennsylvania baseball league. After two years, he was promoted to umpiring in the Double-A Southern Association. After one-year there, he was given the opportunity to umpire American League (AL) spring training games, but was sent back to the Southern Association for more experience for the 1967 season, before joining the AL for the 1968 season.

From early on, O'Donnell's focus on officiating successfully in both sports was the need for consistency.

== NBA career ==
After five years of officiating youth basketball leagues in Delaware County, Pennsylvania, O'Donnell asked the NBA for a tryout as a referee. The Baltimore Bullets gave O'Donnell the opportunity to referee NBA exhibition games in the summer of 1967, and he was among four of 110 applicants the NBA hired as part-time referees. He began officiating in the 1967–68 season, and by January 1968, O'Donnell was assured he would be made a full-time referee for the following season. At the time, he was the second youngest official in NBA history.

As a referee, O'Donnell officiated in 2,134 NBA games (a record held until February 2006 that was broken by Dick Bavetta), 279 playoff games, and 39 NBA Finals games. O'Donnell was a respected official for his no-nonsense, flamboyant style. Early in his NBA career, while also still working as a Major League Baseball (MLB) umpire, O'Donnell said "'In basketball you run the whole game and try to be consistent by working both ends of the floor. The basketball people, more than the baseball people, try to keep a book on you. You can win their respect by being consistent and positive in your calls'". He was the NBA's highest ranked referee for more than a decade during one period of his career.

O’Donnell was not inclined to be intimidated or swayed by the home crowds. According to Harvey Pollack, a long-time statistician for the Philadelphia 76ers, O'Donnell was the most even-handed referee in regards to percentage of wins by road teams in games he officiated compared to other referees. Game 3 of the 1994 NBA Finals between the New York Knicks and Houston Rockets was played in New York, a 93–89 Rockets' win. With less than 29 seconds left in the game, and the Knicks behind by one point, O'Donnell called an offensive foul against future Hall of Fame Knicks' center Patrick Ewing, which resulted in the Rockets gaining offensive possession. When questioned about the call after that game, O'Donnell said "'It was a judgment call. The play was a pick-and-roll. He [Ewing] moved his hip out and then he did it again. I'm not going to let it happen twice'".

O'Donnell was also respected for making the correct call and admitting errors when they occurred. He once took a group of reporters in a rental car to a local TV station to review the game tapes following a controversial finish to a 1981 NBA Playoffs game in Philadelphia that involved the 24-second shot clock and a complaint by then-Milwaukee Bucks head coach Don Nelson. He described Hall of Fame coach and noted referee baiter Red Auerbach as a loudmouth who hated all referees, especially those from Philadelphia. O’Donnell was one of the many top referees coming out of Philadelphia.

O'Donnell announced his retirement as an official in the NBA on December 7, 1995, the same day the league's referees agreed to return to work following a lockout to start the 1995–96 NBA season. Commissioner David Stern said at the time "'Jake has been, without question, one of the greatest referees this league has ever had. ... Every fan and every person associated with the NBA owes him an enormous debt of gratitude for his work'".

=== Clyde Drexler ejection ===
O'Donnell's final game of his officiating career was marred by a controversial ejection of the Houston Rockets' Clyde Drexler during the 1995 NBA Playoffs, which allegedly stemmed from a personal feud between the two at the time. In Game 1 of the second-round playoff matchup between the Rockets and Phoenix Suns, Drexler picked up two technical fouls, which resulted in an ejection, after arguing with O'Donnell over a questionable "clear path" foul against him while going for a loose ball with the Suns' Dan Majerle. This incident occurred after O'Donnell refused to shake hands at a pregame meeting with Drexler before the opening tipoff, which was the history during the previous couple of years. The Rockets complained to the league over O'Donnell's actions and sent a video tape to Commissioner David Stern showing the meeting of O'Donnell refusing to shake Drexler's hand. Elyse Lanier, the wife of Houston Mayor Bob Lanier, personally phoned Stern to complain about O'Donnell.

The league responded to the incident by not assigning O'Donnell to officiate any additional playoff games that year, including the 1995 NBA Finals, which ended a string of 23 consecutive appearances in the Finals. The league also rescinded the standard $1,000 ejection fine to Drexler. The NBA never formally announced the suspension of O'Donnell, but paid him for working the first three playoff rounds, although he did not work past the second round.

Both O'Donnell and the NBA have denied the impression that this incident led to O'Donnell being forced out of the league. At the time, O'Donnell claimed there was no feud between him and Drexler, stating, "I just don't take any crap from anyone, and he couldn't handle that. If he thinks it was personal, fine, but it wasn't from my standpoint." However a year later in an interview with ESPN O'Donnell commented, "I wouldn't give Clyde Drexler much leeway because of the way he reacted with me all the time. I thought at times he would give cheap shots to people, and I just would not allow it".

== MLB career ==
The American League (AL) purchased O'Donnell's contact in 1966, and he was first called up as an MLB umpire in late 1968; umpiring nine games that season. O'Donnell was called up along with former major league player and NBA referee Bill Kunkel, after two AL umpires, Al Salerno and Bill Valentine, were fired by league president Joe Cronin for attempting to organize a union among Junior Circuit umpires. At the time, O'Donnell was the youngest umpire in AL history; and was the only major league official working in two major American sports leagues. Kunkel had been an NBA referee during the 1967–68 season; but jumped to the American Basketball Association for the 1968–69 season. O'Donnell still was the only person officiating in two major American sports leagues in 1971.

O'Donnell's first game as an AL umpire was on September 17, 1968, between the Washington Senators and Cleveland Indians. O'Donnell was the home plate umpire for Mickey Mantle's final game when the New York Yankees played the Boston Red Sox at Fenway Park on September 28, 1968.

During his short career in the majors, principally 1969 to 1971, O'Donnell worked 489 regular season games, the 1971 American League Championship Series between the Baltimore Orioles and the Oakland Athletics, and as the second-base umpire in the 1971 All-Star Game at Tiger Stadium. He is the only person to officiate All-Star games in both Major League Baseball and the NBA. This game was most notable for Reggie Jackson's home run which hit off the right-center field rooftop transformer. O'Donnell was also the third-base umpire for Jim Palmer's no-hitter on August 13, 1969.

O'Donnell resigned from the AL after the 1971 season to concentrate on his burgeoning basketball officiating career. When four veteran NBA referees jumped to the American Basketball Association before the 1969–70 season, O'Donnell's role as an NBA referee would become more prominent, though he was early in his NBA career. This included officiating playoff games that took place in the spring and conflicted with MLB's spring training schedule. After the 1971 season, the AL did not agree to allow O'Donnell to start his umpiring job until after the NBA playoffs were complete; and O'Donnell resigned from his career as an MLB umpire, choosing to remain an NBA official.

O'Donnell's final regular-season baseball game saw him at second base when the Washington Senators were forced to forfeit their final game at Robert F. Kennedy Memorial Stadium to the New York Yankees on September 30, 1971. The Senators held a 7–5 lead with two outs in the ninth inning when unruly fans invaded the field, prompting crew chief Jim Honochick to declare the Yankees the victors by a 9–0 count. The Senators moved to Arlington, Texas, prior to the 1972 season and became the Texas Rangers. Due to the timing of O'Donnell's resignation from the AL, he did not work an event in the Dallas-Fort Worth area until the Dallas Mavericks joined the NBA in October 1980. O'Donnell also did not work another event in the District of Columbia, since the NBA's Bullets were in Baltimore at the time of his resignation and moved to Landover, Maryland, in 1973, where they played at the Capital Centre before moving to the MCI Center in downtown Washington in 1997.

Jim Evans, who was a fill-in for a handful of American League games in 1971, was named as O'Donnell's permanent replacement for the 1972 season. Evans went on to work nearly 28 seasons before he was forced out in 1999 by the failed mass resignation strategy of Major League Umpires Association President Richie Phillips, who coincidentally was a friend of O'Donnell's, as both lived in Philadelphia. Phillips was also the NBA Referee's Association President until he was forced out by Darell Garretson, with whom O'Donnell frequently clashed, in the 1980s.

== See also ==
- List of Major League Baseball umpires (disambiguation)
