= Jack Nies =

American basketball referee

- Born: November 11, 1937 (age 88); Jersey City, New Jersey, U.S.
- Education: University of Saint Mary (Kansas)
- Spouse: Kimberly D. Nies (m. 1999)
- Children: Eric Nies; John Nies; Kim A. Nies; Tara Nies Kolesar
- Parent(s): Mary Balas Nies and John J. Nies
- Basketball career
- Position: NBA referee
- Officiating career: 1978–2009

Jack Nies (pronounced niece, not "nize") (born November 11, 1937) is an American retired National Basketball Association (NBA) referee. Nies officiated 2,046 regular-season games throughout his 31-year career, and wore uniform number 35. In addition, Nies oversaw 150 playoff games, 10 NBA Finals games, two NBA All-Star Games (1996 and 2005), and the 1987 Legends Classic. Internationally, he was part of the referee crew for the 1994 Mexico Challenge and the 1997 McDonald's Championship; 2007 Istanbul, Turkey; Malaga and Madrid Spain—NBA Preseason Games

Nies retired from the NBA following the 2008–09 season.

== Biography ==
Nies graduated from St. Peter's Preparatory School. He led the school to a state championship in 1955, and was awarded an All-State selection. Nies then played basketball for University of Saint Mary in Kansas before graduating in 1961 with a degree in Psychology and Philosophy.

Nies then moved back to New Jersey, and lived in Ocean Township, Monmouth County, New Jersey. He started refereeing high school basketball games while working as a special education teacher in the local school district. He then officiated Eastern League games from 1971 until 1978, when he was hired by the NBA. Then-New York Knicks coach Red Holzman helped by giving the league a letter of recommendation, having been impressed by his refereeing in a game he had seen in 1970.

On April 15, 2008, Nies refereed his 2,000th NBA game as his home state New Jersey Nets overcame a 20-point deficit against the Charlotte Bobcats 112–108. On April 13, 2009, he officiated his last NBA game as the Portland Trail Blazers defeated the Oklahoma City Thunder.

== NBA Finals games worked ==
1997 NBA Finals 1997 Finals, Game 3 1998 NBA Finals 1998 Finals, Game 4

- 2000 Finals, Games 1 and 6
- 2001 Finals, Game 4
- 2002 Finals, Game 1
- 2003 Finals, Game 3
- 2004 Finals, Game 4 (Lead official)
- 2005 Finals, Game 2
- 2006 Finals, Game 3
