= Darell Garretson =

American basketball referee (1932–2008)

- Born: Darell Lee Garretson; March 18, 1932; Long Point, Illinois, U.S.
- Died: April 21, 2008 (aged 76); Mesa, Arizona, U.S.
- Occupations: NBA referee (1967–1994); NBA Supervisor of Officials (1981–1998)
- Spouse: Jeanne
- Children: Ron and Rick

Darell Lee Garretson (March 18, 1932 – April 21, 2008) was an American professional basketball referee in the National Basketball Association (NBA) for 27 years from 1967 to 1994, wearing uniform number 10, and also served as NBA Supervisor of Officials for 17 years from 1981 to 1998. During his career, Garretson officiated over 2,000 games, including 1,798 regular-season NBA games, 269 playoff games, 39 Finals games and five All-Star games.

On April 4, 2016, Garretson was elected into the Naismith Memorial Basketball Hall of Fame as an official.

== Personal ==
=== Early life ===
Born in Long Point, Illinois, Garretson attended Illinois State Normal University (now Illinois State University) during the 1950s and later served in the U.S. Navy, stationed in San Diego, California. Discharging from the Navy in 1960, Garretson remained in California along with his wife, Jeanne. Becoming involved with sports, he served as manager of the Garden Grove, California, team in the Little League World Series in 1968. He also officiated recreational, high school, and college basketball games, while working as a salesman, before being hired by the NBA.

=== Family ===
Darell Garretson and Jeanne Garretson have two sons, Ron, and Rick. Ron Garretson became a basketball official, and was a referee in the NBA until 2019.

=== Death ===
Darell Garretson died in his sleep on April 24, 2008, at his home in Mesa, Arizona, at age 76. The cause of death is an unknown at this time, but it was reported that Garretson's health had been in decline following recent surgery and effects of illnesses.

Following the news of his death, NBA commissioner David Stern said in a statement, "We are saddened by the passing of Darell Garretson. Darell was a man of extraordinary character, who touched many lives during his 31-year tenure as an NBA official and supervisor of officials." Lamell McMorris, spokesman for the National Basketball Referees Association (NBRA), the union representing NBA officials, said, "Our grief at losing Darell Garretson is not just about the loss of an icon, a refereeing legend, although he certainly is both of those things. It is much more personal. Darell discovered and developed so many of our current referees. ... He took them and he coached them, tirelessly, and he made them some of the most elite referees in the world. And they love him for it."

== Income tax fraud ==
In 2000, Garretson pleaded guilty to fraud in an airline-ticket scheme involving purchasing less expensive tickets and pocketing the difference without reporting the additional income to the Internal Revenue Service. He was sentenced to 180 days' home detention, three years of probation, and a US$5,000 fine.

== Legacy ==
As a referee, Garretson was credited for creating and heading the first union for NBA referees, known as the National Association of Basketball Referees, a predecessor to the present day NBRA.

Later when he became officiating supervisor, Garretson was an advocate for increasing the number of officials per NBA game from two to three, beginning with the 1988–89 NBA season, rejecting arguments against the three-official system made by fellow veteran Earl Strom. The addition of the third official allowed for better coverage of the court and also provided mentoring for younger officials with two more experienced officials.

Working in the NBA's front office, he also was involved with scouting prospective officials and providing instruction. He developed the concept of "refereeing the defense", a practice in which officials focus attention on a defensive player instead of watching the ball. He urged all officials to continue improving skills and achieving personal goals by focusing on every possible aspect. Former referee and current director of officiating, Ronnie Nunn said of Garretson, "[he] was a guy who drilled into you to get plays right."

As an official and supervisor in the NBA, Garretson was the target of criticism by the media and notable officials including, Jake O'Donnell, Richie Powers, and Earl Strom. Critics of Garretson claimed that he developed the current generation of referees into "robots" by suppressing individual personality. On the court, Garretson was also known to minimize the amount of communication between himself and players and coaches, which was considered an unpopular approach among members of the media.
