= Eddie Rush =

American basketball player

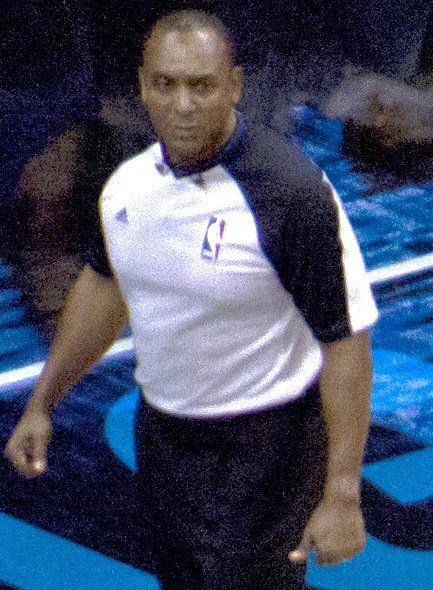
Rush officiating the December 21, 2011 preseason game between the Miami Heat and Orlando Magic at the Amway Center in Orlando

Eddie Fernanzo Rush (born September 19, 1961) is a professional basketball referee in the National Basketball Association (NBA). As of the 2006–07 NBA season, he had officiated 1,245 regular season, and 140 playoff games, including nine NBA Finals games.

== Early life ==
Rush attended W.H. Spencer High School in Columbus, Georgia. At Spencer, he played basketball and baseball. Following high school, he attended college and graduated from Georgia State University in 1983.

== Officiating career ==
Prior to joining the NBA, Rush worked high school games for ten years before progressing to college and professional basketball leagues. At the collegiate level, he officiated for eight years in the Big Ten and Southeastern Conferences, as well as Conference USA. He worked First Round games in the 1991 and 1992 NCAA Tournaments. Later he officiated for five years of Continental Basketball Association officiating experience.

Rush is no relation to long-time NBA referee and former Supervisor of Officials Ed T. Rush, or to musician Ed Rush.

Rush is the only NBA ref to have officiated the last game of the NBA Finals for four straight seasons (2005, 2006, 2007, and 2008).
