= Ron Garretson =

American basketball referee (born 1958)

- Born: July 1, 1958 (age 67); Long Beach, California, U.S.
- Education: Golden West Junior College
- Basketball career
- Position: NBA referee
- Officiating career: 1987–2019

Ronald Garretson (born July 1, 1958, in Long Beach, California) is an American former professional basketball referee for the National Basketball Association (NBA). In his 30-plus NBA seasons, from 1987 until 2019, he had officiated over 1,600 games, including 1,397 regular season NBA games, 157 playoff games and 11 Finals games. He also officiated the 1993 Europe Tour in London and the 1997 and 2013 NBA All-Star Games. He is the son of former NBA referee Darell Garretson, who died in April 2008 at the age of 76.

== Career ==
Garretson attended Servite High School in Anaheim, California, where he played basketball and football. He then earned an Associate of Arts degree from Golden West Junior College. Before joining the NBA as a referee, he spent two years officiating high school games in Arizona and two more in the Continental Basketball Association (CBA).

In a game during the 1995–96 season, Garretson was involved in an on-court incident with Los Angeles Lakers guard Nick Van Exel. After a timeout with 3 minutes left, Garretson called a technical foul on Van Exel for arguing a call. Van Exel continued to argue and reportedly called Garretson a "little midget." Garretson then called another technical foul, which automatically ejected Van Exel. He walked toward the locker room before returning to shove Garretson into the scorer's table. He was immediately restrained by teammates as he continued to swear at the referee. The league later fined him a record-high $25,000 and suspended him for seven regular-season games. Van Exel publicly apologized for his action, though he refused to apologize to Garretson.

In a 2000 playoff game between the Los Angeles Lakers and the Portland Trail Blazers, Garretson ejected then-Blazer Rasheed Wallace after granting a timeout to Los Angeles because he believed that Wallace displayed a negative attitude towards him. Wallace's former teammate, Steve Smith, argued to Garretson that Wallace did not say anything to him. Garretson told Smith that Wallace was warned three times about staring at him.

Garretson was one of three referees who worked the Pacers–Pistons brawl at The Palace of Auburn Hills on November 19, 2004, which ended in a fight between Pacers players and Pistons fans.

Garretson was inducted into Servite High School's Athletic Hall of Fame in May 2000.
