= Dick Bavetta =

American basketball referee (born 1939)

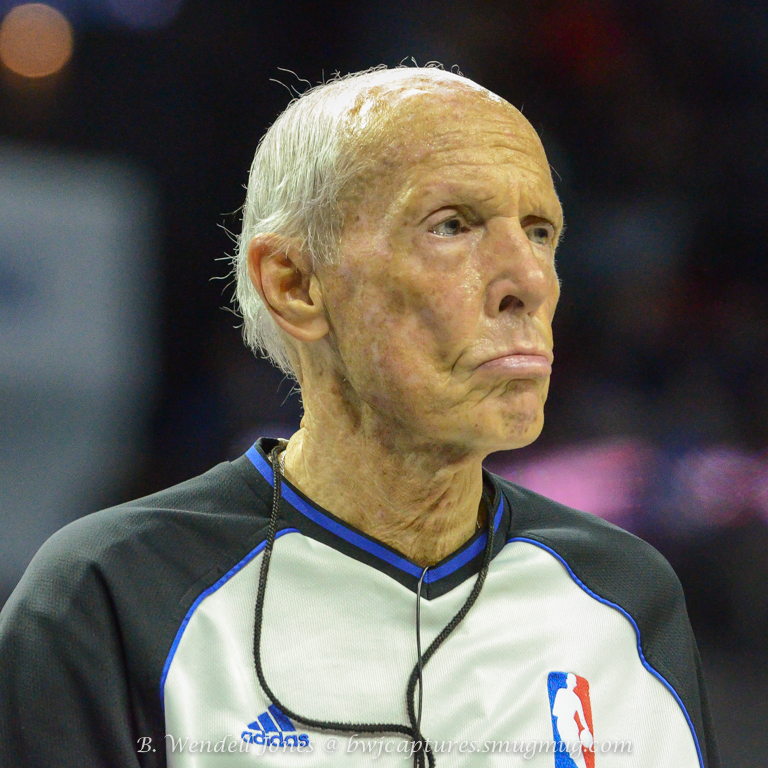
- Bavetta in 2013
- Born: Richard William Bavetta; December 10, 1939 (age 86); New York City, U.S.
- Education: St. Francis College
- Spouse: Paulette
- Children: Christine & Michele
- Basketball career

Personal information
- Listed height: 6 ft 0 in (183 cm)
- Listed weight: 156 lb (71 kg)
- Position: NBA referee
- Officiating career: 1975–2014
- Basketball Hall of Fame

Richard William Bavetta (born December 10, 1939) is an American retired referee for the National Basketball Association (NBA). He debuted in the league in 1975 and never missed an assigned game until 2014, and he holds the league record for most officiated games with 2,635.

His game on April 12, 2013, in Washington was his 2,600th consecutive game as an NBA official.

== Early life ==
Bavetta was born in the Park Slope neighborhood of Brooklyn, New York on December 10, 1939. His father was an officer for the New York Police Department, and his mother was a homemaker. Bavetta attended Power Memorial Academy in New York City (the same school future NBA star Kareem Abdul-Jabbar attended) and is a 1962 graduate of St. Francis College in New York and played on the schools' basketball teams. He began officiating after his brother, Joe, who officiated for the American Basketball Association, convinced him that it would be an interesting career. A Wall Street broker for Salomon Brothers with an MBA in finance from the New York Institute of Finance, Bavetta began officiating games between fellow brokers in the Wall Street League, played at New York's Downtown Athletic Club, and later worked high school games. For ten years, he officiated Public and Catholic High School leagues in New York and later nine years in the Eastern Professional Basketball League, which later became the Continental Basketball Association.

== NBA officiating career ==
In the mid-1960s, he began to attend regional referee tryouts in the hopes of becoming an NBA referee; however, he was rejected for eight straight years due to his small physique and unimposing size. Bavetta was finally hired by the NBA in 1975 following the retirement of Mendy Rudolph. He debuted December 2, 1975 at Madison Square Garden in an NBA game between the New York Knicks and the Boston Celtics. His first ten years in the league were tough as he was constantly ranked bottom among NBA referees in performance evaluations and led the league in technical fouls and ejections called.

To improve his officiating, Bavetta refereed games for the New Jersey pro league and Rucker League in Harlem during the off-seasons and studied NBA rulebooks. In 1983, he became the first referee to undergo rigorous physical training. He ran six to eight miles and took three-hour naps every day. His effort paid off when he emerged as one of the best referees. In the 1980s, he was named chief referee, who has the power to approve or overrule calls made by other officials. He was assigned to officiate his first playoff game in 1986.

Bavetta's most memorable game occurred during a 1980s nationally televised contest between the Philadelphia 76ers and Boston Celtics when he was forced to officiate an NBA game by himself after his partner, Jack Madden, broke his leg in a collision with Celtics guard Dennis Johnson. At one point in the game, Celtics forward Larry Bird and 76ers forward Julius Erving began to strangle each other and were ejected by Bavetta. Bavetta believed that this game assisted in the progression of his career in the NBA.

From 1990 to 2000, Bavetta regularly refereed playoff games and was ranked at the top among referees in terms of performance evaluation. In 2000, he was one of the highest-paid referees in the NBA, earning over $200,000 a year. Among those playoff games included Game 6 of the 1998 NBA Finals, in which Bavetta ruled that a three-point basket made by Howard Eisley of the Utah Jazz was released after the shot clock buzzer sounded and thus would not count. However, television replays on NBC showed otherwise. Bavetta's career was threatened when he was accidentally hit in the nose by Pacers forward Jalen Rose, who was trying to punch Knicks center Patrick Ewing during a 1999 game between the Indiana Pacers and the New York Knicks. Bavetta did not leave the game immediately, opting to wait until later in the day to have surgery. He returned the next day to officiate an Atlanta Hawks-New Jersey Nets game.

On February 8, 2006, Bavetta officiated his 2,135th NBA game, setting a league record for most games officiated that was previously held by Jake O'Donnell. Bavetta said the secret to his longevity was "wearing five pairs of socks", which he claims helped keep his feet in good shape. Contributing to his good health, Bavetta says he runs five to eight miles every day. For his longevity in the league, he has received the nickname "the Cal Ripken Jr. of referees".

During the 2006–07 season, Bavetta officiated a December 16, 2006 game between the New York Knicks and Denver Nuggets. The game involved a brawl where all ten players on the court were ejected by Bavetta and his officiating crew. The league eventually suspended seven players for a total of 47 games and fined both teams $500,000.

After 39 years of officiating in the NBA, Bavetta officially retired on August 19, 2014, having officiated 2,635 consecutive regular season games.

=== Charitable works ===
Bavetta is also actively involved in charitable works. He has established and financed the Lady Bavetta Scholarships since 1986 in honor of his daughters, awarded to high school minority children based on their needs. He has volunteered since 1992 with Double H Hole in the Woods Ranch working with children and teens with a multitude of medical special needs. He also works with the Juvenile Diabetes Research Foundation and serves as the Upstate New York Regional Director for the Juvenile Diabetes Foundation.

During the 2007 NBA All-Star Weekend, Bavetta raced Turner Network Television (TNT) studio analyst and former NBA player Charles Barkley for a $75,000 charitable donation ($50,000 contributed by the NBA and $25,000 by TNT) to the Las Vegas Boys & Girls Clubs of America, but lost by a narrow margin. The distance of the race was three and one half full lengths of the court (or 329 feet). Bavetta lost the race despite a last-second dive and Barkley running the last portion of the race backwards. The dive resulted in an abrasion injury to Bavetta's right knee.

== Controversies ==
=== Altercations with Earl Strom ===
According to Darryl Dawkins' autobiography, Bavetta was officiating an NBA game during the mid-1970s between the Philadelphia 76ers and New Jersey Nets with Earl Strom as his partner for that game. Bavetta overruled Strom on a crucial last-second personal foul call against the Nets, which would have been a victory for the 76ers. When the game ended and players were walking to their respective locker rooms, the door to the referees' locker room flew open and Bavetta came staggering out. His uniform was allegedly ripped and he was wearing a big welt over his eye, running to get away from Strom. Strom stepped out into the hallway and hollered after Bavetta, "You'll take another one of my fucking calls again, right, you motherfucker?" Strom was fined for the incident.

Bavetta had another altercation with Strom when Strom tried to choke Bavetta before an NBA game in 1989. Strom reportedly apologized within two weeks of the incident.

=== Allegations of game fixing ===
Bavetta was one of three referees for the Game 6 of the 2002 Western Conference Finals between the Kings and the Lakers. Former referee Tim Donaghy has alleged that at least one of the referees working this game had subjective motives for wanting the Lakers to defeat the Kings, and made officiating calls to effectuate this outcome. NBA rules prohibited active referees from commenting on the situation publicly. The New York Times reported on June 12, 2008, that the Federal Bureau of Investigation investigated allegations that Game 6 of the 2002 Western Conference Finals had been manipulated to extend the series to a seventh game.

In a 2002 article, Bill Simmons named the worst officiated games of the prior four years, alleging that the games involved either extending a series so it did not end quickly or advancing a large market team for the NBA's benefit. All seven games named had been officiated by Bavetta.

== Other achievements ==
- Inducted into the New York City Catholic High School Hall of Fame on June 1, 2000.
- Received the National Pro-Am Lifetime Achievement Award on October 14, 2002.
- Inducted into the Naismith Memorial Basketball Hall of Fame in 2015.
- Was the recipient of the 2016 Jerry Colangelo Award at the Athletes in Action All Star Breakfast, which is held each year during the NBA All Star Weekend.
