= Ronnie Nunn =

American basketball referee

Ronnie Nunn (born in Brooklyn, New York) is a former professional basketball referee in the National Basketball Association (NBA) for nineteen seasons and served for five years as the league's director of officials, until being reassigned in 2008 in the wake of the Tim Donaghy scandal. Nunn continued to provide officiating insights as a co-host of the NBA's Show, Making the Call With Ronnie Nunn for seven seasons on NBA TV. He officiated 1,134 regular season, 73 playoff, four NBA Finals games, and the 1996 NBA All-Star Game.

Nunn has continued his officiating teaching expertise to further elevate official's performances worldwide. Nunn worked a number of years as a developmental clinician to the Euroleague and currently works similarly for the National Basketball League (NBL) of Australia, the Basketball Super League (BSL) of Canada, The Basketball League (TBL) in the USA.

Nunn created his ongoing NunnBetterRefs (NBR) Camp that includes a Training & Developmental Initiative providing a season-long "curriculum and practicum" officiating experience which culminates in certain selected officials invited to the NBR's Summer Performance Showcase Tournament. The emphasis for all NBR officials is to elevate their abilities to become viable candidates for higher level officiating appointments in amateur, professional, domestic or international leagues.

In 2014, Nunn also worked for a season with the NY Knicks as a "specialty coach". As a former player, college coach and ultimately NBA Official, he created a program for players that emphasized fouling reduction techniques, while also providing methods for successful engagements by players with officials during moments of disagreements on calling decisions.

== Early life ==
Nunn attended Brooklyn Technical High School where he was an All City Basketball player and an All City Honorable Mention Baseball player. He later played for George Washington Revolutionaries. He was inducted into the GWU Basketball Hall of Fame as well as being part of GWU's Basketball's All Century Team After college, he played two seasons of professional basketball for Leon Lechugueros of the Circuito Nacional de basket Mexico and was named by the Mexico press as the North American player of the decade during the 70's while only playing two seasons in the league. After a season in Mexico, he was invited to the ABA's Denver Rockets Training Camp and after his second season invited to the NY Knicks pre-season camp.

Previous to his appointment to the NBA's Officiating staff, Nunn was a ten-year special education teacher and administrator while he also became a Pace University assistant basketball coach from 1978 to 1982. Nunn began to explore basketball officiating and joined an NBA pro-oriented officiating program entitled the National ProAm League in 1980. After an invitation to the NBA's Summer league in 1982, Nunn became a staff official for the Continental Basketball Association (CBA). In 1984 he was appointed to the NBA officiating staff. In his 27-year career with the NBA, he served the league as an Official, Director of Officiating and the co-host of an NBATV Show, Making the Call with Ronnie Nunn.
