= Tim Thomas (basketball) =

American basketball player (born 1977)

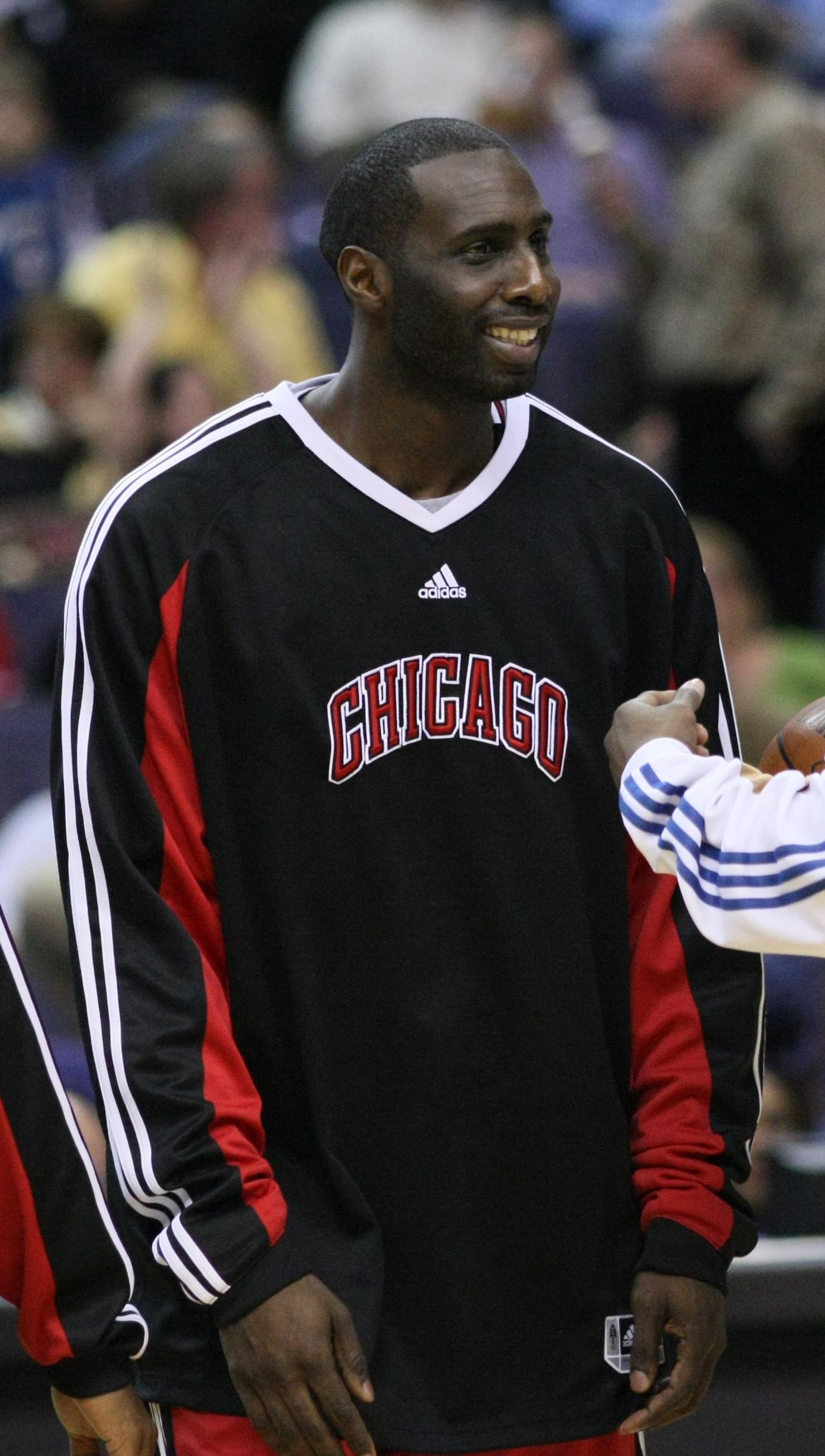
- Thomas with the Chicago Bulls in 2009

Personal information
- Born: February 26, 1977 (age 49) Paterson, New Jersey, U.S.
- Listed height: 6 ft 10 in (2.08 m)
- Listed weight: 240 lb (109 kg)

Career information
- High school: Paterson Catholic (Paterson, New Jersey)
- College: Villanova (1996–1997)
- NBA draft: 1997: 1st round, 7th overall pick
- Drafted by: New Jersey Nets
- Playing career: 1997–2010
- Position: Small forward / power forward
- Number: 1, 5, 2, 7
- Coaching career: 2023–present

Career history

Playing
- 1997–1999: Philadelphia 76ers
- 1999–2004: Milwaukee Bucks
- 2004–2005: New York Knicks
- 2005–2006: Chicago Bulls
- 2006: Phoenix Suns
- 2006–2008: Los Angeles Clippers
- 2008–2009: New York Knicks
- 2009: Chicago Bulls
- 2009–2010: Dallas Mavericks

Coaching
- 2023–present: Paramus Catholic HS

Career highlights
- NBA All-Rookie Second Team (1998); Third-team All-Big East (1997); Big East Freshman of the Year (1997); McDonald's All-American (1996); 2× First-team Parade All-American (1995, 1996); Second-team Parade All-American (1994)

Career NBA statistics
- Points: 9,454 (11.5 ppg)
- Rebounds: 3,379 (4.1 rpg)
- Assists: 1,272 (1.5 apg)
- Stats at NBA.com
- Stats at Basketball Reference

Timothy Mark Thomas (born February 26, 1977) is an American basketball coach and former professional player. He was a highly ranked prospect while playing at Paterson Catholic High School in his hometown of Paterson, New Jersey. Thomas played college basketball for the Villanova Wildcats and declared for the 1997 NBA draft after his freshman season. He spent thirteen seasons in the National Basketball Association (NBA) for the Philadelphia 76ers, Milwaukee Bucks, New York Knicks, Chicago Bulls, Phoenix Suns, Los Angeles Clippers and Dallas Mavericks. Thomas serves as the head coach of the boys basketball team at Paramus Catholic High School in Paramus, New Jersey.

== High school ==
A versatile 6 ft 10 in (2.08 m) forward with a soft shooting touch, Thomas was tabbed as a future NBA star when he was still in high school, and was selected to the McDonald's All-American team after averaging 25.3 points and 14.5 rebounds per game as a senior at Paterson Catholic High School. He was ranked as the no. 2 recruit in the nation behind only Kobe Bryant the two both played in the 1996 High School McDonald's All-American game, the All-Star Magic Johnson Roundball Classic game, as well as AAU which they dominated together. Thomas considered making the jump straight to the NBA from high school, waiting to declare his decision to attend college at Villanova until just days before the deadline to enter the NBA draft.

== College career ==
Thomas made his mark in his one season of college basketball at Villanova University. Joining a future NBA talent-laden team with Alvin Williams, Jason Lawson, John Celestand and Malik Allen, he filled the void of former Big East Player of the Year Kerry Kittles from the year before and helped lead the Wildcats to a Big East regular season title under head coach Steve Lappas. Villanova took second place in the Big East tournament, while Thomas was named to both All-Big East and All-Big East Tournament teams as well as win Big East Rookie of the Year award while averaging 17 points and 6 rebounds per game. Villanova would make the 1997 NCAA tournament but lost in second round to California, which featured future NFL Hall of Famer Tony Gonzalez.

== NBA career ==
Following his freshman year at Villanova, he was drafted seventh overall by the New Jersey Nets in the 1997 NBA draft and was immediately traded to the Philadelphia 76ers in exchange for the 76ers' draft pick (Keith Van Horn).

=== Philadelphia 76ers ===
Thomas enjoyed a solid rookie season, averaging 11 points per game, and was named to the NBA's All-Rookie Second Team. On February 14, 1998, in possibly the best game of his rookie season, Thomas scored 27 points and grabbed 6 rebounds in a loss against the Nets. The 76ers would grow impatient with a sophomore slump from Thomas, though, and in 1999 he and Scott Williams were traded to the Milwaukee Bucks for Jerald Honeycutt and Tyrone Hill.

=== Milwaukee Bucks ===
Milwaukee was enamored with Thomas's raw talent and versatility, and hoped he could blossom into a star with more seasoning. On May 13, 1999, in the deciding game of Milwaukee's first round series versus the Indiana Pacers, Thomas scored 12 points and grabbed 5 rebounds in a 99–91 loss. On March 2, 2000, Thomas scored 26 points and grabbed 5 rebounds in a loss against the Knicks. During the 2000–01 season, he averaged a career-high 13.4 ppg for the Bucks. On January 5, 2001, Thomas connected on eight three-point field goals in the second half of Milwaukee's 119–115 loss to Portland in which he finished with a career-high 39 points.

During that year's postseason, on April 28, Thomas scored 18 points and grabbed 7 rebounds in a Game 4 win against Tracy McGrady and the Orlando Magic. The Bucks would ultimately come up short against that season's MVP, Allen Iverson, in a tightly contested Eastern Conference Finals against the 76ers, Thomas' former team. Nevertheless, after a strong playoff performance that year, Thomas signed a new deal with the Bucks worth roughly $66 million over six years, despite being offered more money by Chicago. Upon signing the deal, Bucks owner Herb Kohl said "Tim is a very vital part of this team, and we were willing to take any steps we needed to keep him in town.″

On January 11, 2002, Thomas scored 25 points and grabbed 6 rebounds in a 105–86 win against the Washington Wizards. Four days later, Thomas again scored 25 points, this time in a 106–102 win over the Indiana Pacers. The Bucks would miss that season's playoffs, their first postseason miss during Thomas' tenure.

On December 9, 2002, Thomas scored 22 points and grabbed 9 rebounds in a 140–133 double overtime win against the Cleveland Cavaliers. On April 19, 2003, Thomas scored a playoff career-high 25 points in a Game 1 loss versus the New Jersey Nets. The Bucks would go on to lose the series in 6 games.

During his time with the Bucks, then-teammate Ray Allen was quoted as saying, "If he wanted to, Tim Thomas could be the best player in the league." While on the Bucks, Thomas was known to wear a customized version of his own jersey that said "Notorious T.I.M." on the back while making public appearances at events.

=== New York Knicks ===
On February 16, 2004, Thomas was traded to the New York Knicks in a three-team trade that also included the Atlanta Hawks. The trade also sent Keith Van Horn, whom Thomas was also traded for during the 1997 draft, from the Knicks to the Bucks, Nazr Mohammed from the Hawks to the Knicks, Joel Przybilla from the Bucks to the Hawks, and Michael Doleac from the Knicks to the Hawks.

During game 1 of the Knicks' first-round playoff series against the Nets, Thomas suffered an injury that kept him out of the remainder of the playoffs, when he was fouled by Jason Collins and taken out of the game on a stretcher. The incident started a long feud with Nets forward Kenyon Martin, whom Thomas called a fake tough guy, that continued past both players' playing careers.

In 2017, Thomas rehashed their feud on an episode of the Scoop B Radio Podcast. Thomas told Brandon Scoop B Robinson that he'd like to settle his feud with Martin once and for all with a boxing match. The proceeds would go to the charity of their choice. Martin declined.

=== Chicago Bulls ===
Prior to the 2005–06 season, Thomas was traded to the Chicago Bulls, along with Jermaine Jackson, Mike Sweetney, a 2006 1st-round draft pick, a 2007 1st-round draft pick, a 2007 2nd-round draft pick and a 2009 2nd-round draft pick, in exchange for Eddy Curry, Antonio Davis and a 2007 1st-round draft pick.

Playing in the final year of his contract, Thomas was given minimal minutes from the rebuilding Bulls. After playing just three games for Chicago, Thomas was deactivated while dealing with ankle and back injuries. After not playing for nearly four months, Thomas was granted his release from the Bulls.

=== Phoenix Suns ===
On March 1, 2006, Thomas agreed to terms with the Phoenix Suns to a contract for the remainder of the season. He made his debut with the Suns two days later, scoring 20 points off the bench in a 123–118 win over Orlando. Playing alongside reigning NBA MVP Steve Nash (who won a consecutive MVP award that year), Thomas rejuvenated his career in Phoenix.

In the playoffs, Thomas played a crucial role in the Suns run to the Western Conference Finals. Starting in place of injured All-Star Amar'e Stoudemire (who did not play the entirety of the playoffs), Thomas scored a game-high 22 points with 15 rebounds in a game 1 victory in the first round over the Lakers. In game 6, Thomas hit the game-tying three at the end of regulation and an important three-pointer late in overtime to seal the Suns' win. The Suns won game 7, overcoming a 3–1 series deficit.

In the Suns' second-round series against the Clippers, Thomas was credited for his defense on Elton Brand, helping the team to another seven-game series win. In the Western Conference Finals, Phoenix fell to the Dallas Mavericks in six games. In game five of that series, Thomas "blew a kiss" to Maverick Dirk Nowitzki, who then proceeded to score a total of 50 points for the game. Thomas expressed an interest in re-signing with Phoenix, though the Suns were over the salary cap and expected Stoudemire to return as their starter.

=== Los Angeles Clippers ===
On July 13, 2006, Thomas signed a four-year, $24 million contract with the Los Angeles Clippers. He frequently started in place of Elton Brand and Chris Kaman, though Thomas himself also battled injuries.

=== Second stint with New York ===
On November 21, 2008, Thomas and Cuttino Mobley were traded to the New York Knicks, in exchange for Zach Randolph and Mardy Collins. In his return to the Knicks, Thomas was reunited with Mike D'Antoni, who was his coach in Phoenix.

=== Second stint with Chicago ===
On February 19, 2009, Thomas was traded again to the Bulls along with center Jerome James and guard Anthony Roberson in exchange for guard Larry Hughes just before the trade deadline. His second stint in Chicago was more successful than his first, as he provided veteran leadership to the young team, helping the Bulls make a late-season push to qualify for the playoffs. Though entering the playoffs as the seventh seed, they were able to push their first-round series against the defending-champion Boston Celtics to a full seven games.

On July 14, 2009, the Bulls negotiated a buyout of Thomas's $6.5 million contract.

=== Dallas Mavericks ===
On July 28, 2009, the Dallas Mavericks signed free agent Thomas. In late January, however, he left the team temporarily to take care of his wife, who had an undisclosed illness.

In August 2010 Thomas agreed to a one-year deal with the Mavericks worth the veteran minimum. In September of that year, however, he told the club that he would not report to the team so that he could care for his sick wife.

== Coaching career ==
On March 30, 2023, Thomas was named as head coach of the boys basketball team at Paramus Catholic High School in Paramus, New Jersey.

== NBA career statistics ==
Legend
GP	Games played	GS	Games started	MPG	Minutes per game
FG%	Field goal percentage	3P%	3-point field goal percentage	FT%	Free throw percentage
RPG	Rebounds per game	APG	Assists per game	SPG	Steals per game
BPG	Blocks per game	PPG	Points per game	**Bold**	Career high

=== Regular season ===
Year	Team	GP	GS	MPG	FG%	3P%	FT%	RPG	APG	SPG	BPG	PPG
1997–98	Philadelphia	77	48	23.1	.447	.363	.740	3.7	1.2	.7	.2	11.0
1998–99	Philadelphia	17	0	11.1	.403	.263	.792	1.9	.9	.2	.2	4.6
1998–99	Milwaukee	33	26	18.9	**.495**	.327	.614	2.8	.9	.7	.3	8.5
1999–2000	Milwaukee	**80**	1	26.2	.461	.346	.774	4.2	1.4	.7	.4	11.8
2000–01	Milwaukee	76	16	27.4	.430	.412	.771	4.1	1.8	**1.0**	**.6**	12.6
2001–02	Milwaukee	74	22	26.9	.420	.326	.793	4.1	1.4	.9	.4	11.7
2002–03	Milwaukee	**80**	**70**	29.5	.443	.366	.780	4.9	1.3	.9	**.6**	13.3
2003–04	Milwaukee	42	42	**32.0**	.443	.362	.762	4.9	2.1	**1.0**	.4	14.1
2003–04	New York	24	23	31.1	.452	.406	.813	4.8	1.4	**1.0**	.2	**15.8**
2004–05	New York	71	68	27.3	.439	.409	.786	3.3	1.5	.6	.2	12.0
2005–06	Chicago	3	0	10.7	.375	.167	—	1.3	.7	.0	.3	4.3
2005–06	Phoenix	26	10	24.4	.435	.429	.667	4.9	.7	.6	.2	11.0
2006–07	L.A. Clippers	76	24	27.0	.414	.382	.708	5.0	2.3	.7	.4	11.0
2007–08	L.A. Clippers	63	51	30.8	.413	.306	.752	**5.1**	**2.7**	.6	.5	12.4
2008–09	L.A. Clippers	10	5	22.0	.378	.300	.618	4.6	1.0	.3	.1	9.5
2008–09	New York	36	1	21.5	.461	.421	.806	3.1	1.3	.6	.3	9.6
2008–09	Chicago	18	0	14.1	.400	**.442**	.700	2.3	.7	.3	.0	5.8
2009–10	Dallas	18	1	15.8	.462	.372	**.875**	2.3	.8	.6	.1	7.5
Career		824	408	25.9	.437	.369	.758	4.1	1.5	.7	.4	11.5

=== Playoffs ===
Year	Team	GP	GS	MPG	FG%	3P%	FT%	RPG	APG	SPG	BPG	PPG
1999	Milwaukee	3	3	20.0	.444	.000	.583	4.0	.3	.3	.3	7.7
2000	Milwaukee	5	0	28.4	**.492**	.333	**.824**	4.8	2.0	.2	.8	15.4
2001	Milwaukee	18	0	26.6	.448	.431	.815	4.5	1.6	.5	.6	11.3
2003	Milwaukee	6	5	**31.8**	.462	**.571**	.719	4.8	1.3	.5	**1.0**	**17.8**
2004	New York	1	1	22.0	.400	.000	.800	5.0	**3.0**	.0	.0	12.0
2006	Phoenix	**20**	**14**	**31.8**	.491	.444	.776	**6.3**	1.3	**.9**	.4	15.1
2009	Chicago	2	0	7.5	.300	.250	—	1.5	.0	.0	.0	3.5
Career		55	23	28.1	.468	.436	.772	5.1	1.4	.6	.5	13.3
