= Wilson Chandler =

American basketball player (born 1987)

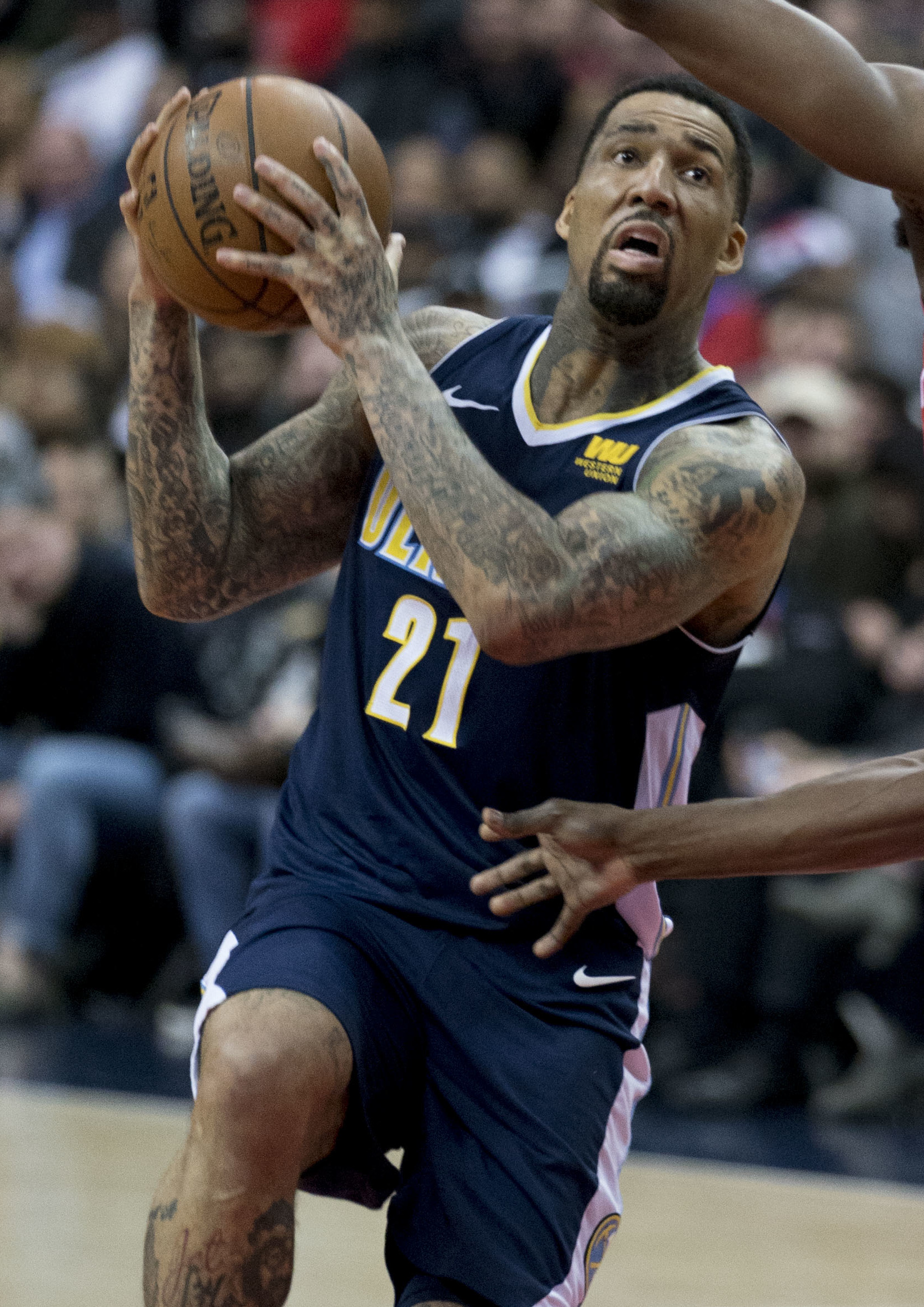
- Chandler with the Denver Nuggets in 2018

Personal information
- Born: May 10, 1987 (age 39) Benton Harbor, Michigan, U.S.
- Listed height: 6 ft 8 in (2.03 m)
- Listed weight: 235 lb (107 kg)

Career information
- High school: Benton Harbor (Benton Harbor, Michigan)
- College: DePaul (2005–2007)
- NBA draft: 2007: 1st round, 23rd overall pick
- Drafted by: New York Knicks
- Playing career: 2007–2020
- Position: Small forward
- Number: 21, 22

Career history
- 2007–2011: New York Knicks
- 2011: Denver Nuggets
- 2011–2012: Zhejiang Lions
- 2012–2018: Denver Nuggets
- 2018–2019: Philadelphia 76ers
- 2019: Los Angeles Clippers
- 2019–2020: Brooklyn Nets
- 2020: Zhejiang Guangsha Lions

Career highlights
- Second-team All-Big East (2007); Big East All-Rookie Team (2006); Third-team Parade All-American (2005); Mr. Basketball of Michigan (2005)
- Stats at NBA.com
- Stats at Basketball Reference

Wilson Jamall Chandler (born May 10, 1987) is an American former professional basketball player who played in the NBA for 13 seasons, mainly with the New York Knicks and Denver Nuggets. He also played for Zhejiang Guangsha of the Chinese Basketball Association (CBA) during the 2011 NBA lockout. He played college basketball for the DePaul Blue Demons for two years before declaring for the 2007 NBA draft, where he was a first-round selection of the Knicks. Chandler was listed at 6 ft 8 in. and 225 lbs. He could play both forward positions.

== Early life ==
When growing up in Benton Harbor, Michigan, a three-hour drive from Detroit and two hours from Chicago, Chandler was raised by his grandparents. He started playing basketball at Fairplain East Elementary School in the Benton Harbor Area Schools when he was in fifth grade; he later attended Benton Harbor High School. There he received Michigan All-State mentions as a sophomore and junior; while averaging 22.4 points and 12 rebounds as a junior, he helped the BHHS Tigers to a 19–4 record. He was also named to the first team All-State by the Basketball Coaches Association of Michigan. As a senior, he averaged 24 points, 12 rebounds, five assists, and four blocks per game. That year, Chandler and the Tigers went undefeated during the regular season and were ranked #1 in the state. They were beaten by eventual state champion Holt High School in the regional final. Chandler was named Mr. Basketball of Michigan for 2005.

== College career ==
Chandler was recruited by and considered Michigan State, Ohio State, Indiana University, Purdue University and the University of Dayton; however, he committed to DePaul University late in 2004. During his freshman season at DePaul, he achieved an average of 10.6 points and 7.2 rebounds (ranked 10th in the Big East) per game. On November 30, 2005, Chandler had his first breakout game, putting up 17 points, 8 rebounds and 4 blocks in a Blue Demons win over Creighton University. On December 10, 2005, he recorded 16 rebounds against Dayton, the most by a freshman since Quentin Richardson grabbed 16 in 1999. He earned Big East Rookie of the Week honors twice that season. He was also named to the Big East freshman team. Chandler scored 20 or more points 4 times, with a career-high of 26. During his sophomore season, he averaged 14.7 points, 6.9 rebounds, and 1.4 blocks per game. As a sophomore, Chandler was named to the Big East all second team, and recorded eight double-doubles, while leading the team to a 20-win season. They made it to the quarterfinals of the NIT. He left the college tenth on DePaul's all-time list for blocked shots with 86.

== Professional career ==
=== New York Knicks (2007–2011) ===
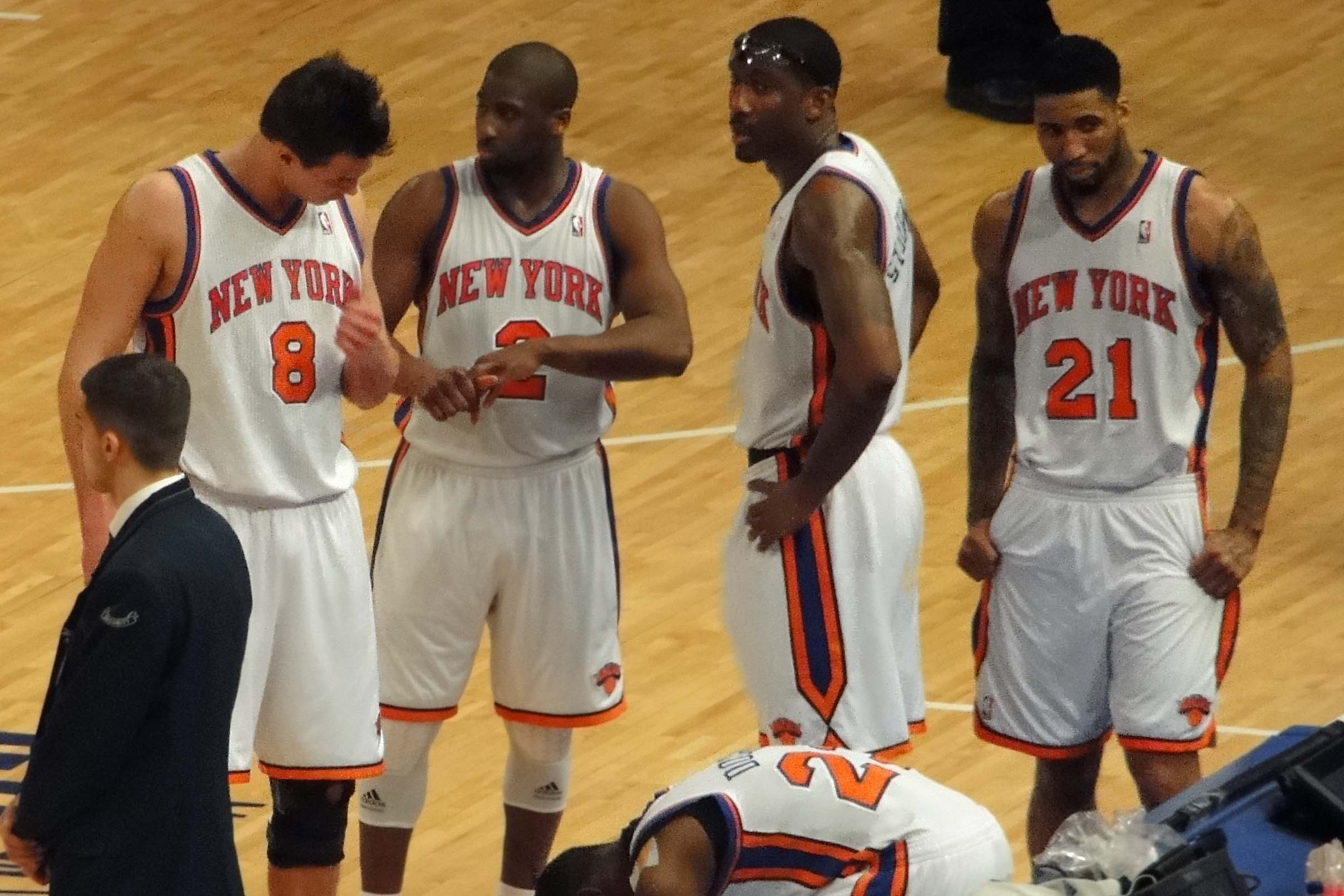
Chandler (#21) with the Knicks in January 2011

In April 2007, Chandler decided to enter his name in the 2007 NBA draft after careful consideration. Before entering the draft, he hired Chris Grier as his agent. He had not worked out for many teams prior to the draft. He was injured in Atlanta before being able to work out with any other teams. The Knicks talked to his agent and told him they were interested in him. Isiah Thomas, the team's general manager, had very good contacts at DePaul University and knew about him from watching him play in college.

On June 28, 2007, Chandler was taken 23rd overall in the 2007 NBA draft by the Knicks. In his first game on November 13, 2007, he recorded 8 points, 2 rebounds and a steal. He had his best game on April 6, 2008, scoring 23 points vs. the Orlando Magic. He finished the season averaging 7.3 points per game.

In the 2008–09 season under head coach Mike D'Antoni, Chandler saw his role with the Knicks expand. He finished the season averaging 14.4 points and 5.4 rebounds per game, while playing in all 82 games. Chandler had a breakout game against the Toronto Raptors, scoring 32 points on 12–23 shooting, including 6–10 from beyond the arc. Chandler participated in the 2009 Rookie Challenge, where he was tied for most rebounds on the sophomore squad.

In 65 games in 2009–10, Chandler averaged 15.3 points, 5.4 rebounds and 2.1 assists.

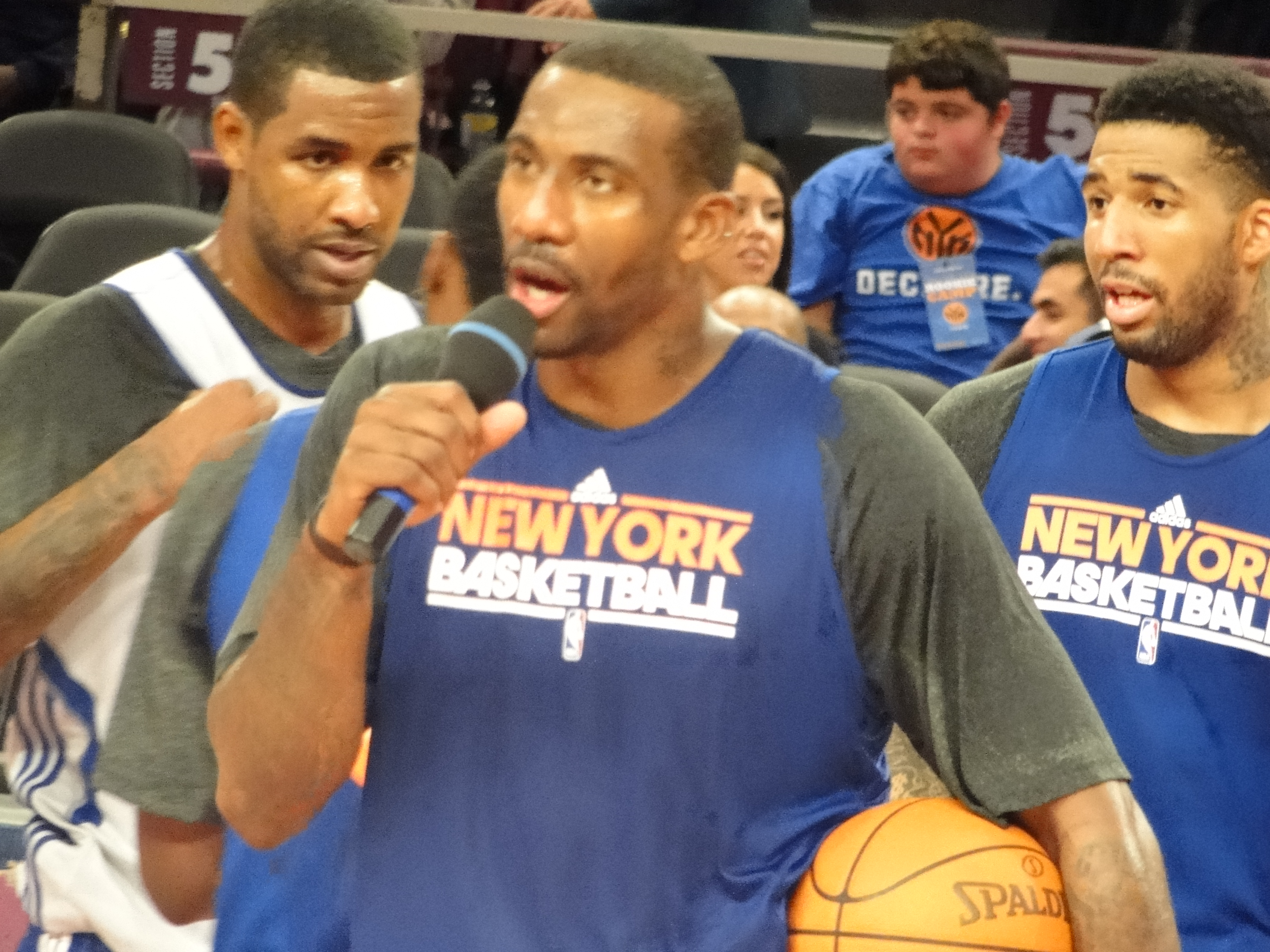
Chandler (right) in October 2010

On November 11, 2010, in a loss to the Golden State Warriors, Chandler had his front tooth inadvertently knocked out by former teammate David Lee. Chandler sat out for a few minutes before returning to the game to finish with 27 points and 3 blocks. On February 9, 2011, Chandler set a new career-high with 35 points against the Sacramento Kings, but the Knicks lost 118–114. Chandler assisted teammate Nate Robinson in the dunk contest during the All-Star Weekend. In the dunk, Nate Robinson used Chandler's back as a trampoline to dunk the basketball. During the season Chandler provided a clutch play down the stretch in a game against the Atlanta Hawks. Chandler had struggled all game but came up with a big block on a Josh Smith dunk attempt. The blocked shot was rebounded by Al Horford, who attempted a put-back but released the shot too late according to the referees. The Knicks once again finished the season with a poor record at 29–53, missing the playoffs. The Knicks made moves such as trading for Tracy McGrady in order to have cap space to make a big signing during the offseason and put talent around Chandler. The big signing ended up being Amar'e Stoudemire. Chandler scored 22 points in a season opening win for the new-look Knicks on October 27, 2010.

On January 6, 2011, Knicks GM Donnie Walsh indicated his intentions to sign Chandler to a long-term deal. Chandler was enjoying his best season as a Knick and embraced the new sixth man role coach Mike D'Antoni appointed him to. Chandler would come off the bench and play positions 2 to 4 on the floor. During the season Chandler also became one of the best shot-blocking wing players. Chandler's best game of the season was a 31-point effort against the San Antonio Spurs on January 4, 2011. The Spurs at the time were the NBA's best team and were easily defeated under Chandler's big game.

=== Denver Nuggets (2011) ===
On February 22, 2011, Chandler was traded to the Nuggets in a three-way blockbuster deal which also involved the Minnesota Timberwolves, and sent Carmelo Anthony to New York. Chandler immediately made an impact in his debut for the Nuggets, scoring 16 points, including 8 key fourth quarter points, in a victory over the Boston Celtics. In Denver, Chandler had to adapt to a more open offense. The Nuggets with the addition of him and teammates Danilo Gallinari and Raymond Felton had one of the deepest, most explosive teams in the NBA. The Nuggets ended up playing better without superstar Carmelo Anthony, clinching the fifth seed in the playoffs with a 50–32 record. On March 23, 2011, in a 115–112 win over the San Antonio Spurs, he played through a sprained ankle and finished the game with a remarkable 6 blocks. Though he finished with 8 points, he made a clutch jumper with 29.3 seconds left to give the Nuggets the lead for good, 114–112. Chandler made his first trip to the playoffs where the Nuggets would match up against the Oklahoma City Thunder, led by Kevin Durant. In his first playoff game Chandler scored 9 points to go along with 8 rebounds. Chandler struggled in the playoffs, averaging only 4.8 points and 5.0 rebounds in only 23 minutes a game. The Nuggets were defeated in five games.

=== Zhejiang Guangsha Lions (2011–2012) ===
In August 2011, in the midst of an NBA lockout, Chandler signed with the Zhejiang Guangsha Lions of the Chinese Basketball Association. With Zhejiang Guangsha, he played under former Dallas Mavericks head coach Jim Cleamons. About his decision, Chandler said, "Maybe I'll lose out, but I think it can be a great experience. I haven't been in any [labor negotiation] meetings. I can't call it. I'm just taking a risk, at the end of the day." His deal didn't have an out-clause, which meant that Chandler wouldn't return until after the All-Star break. Had Chandler not signed with a Chinese team, he would have been a restricted free agent. Zhejiang Guangsha attempted to put more NBA talent around Chandler by signing Earl Clark, who asked to leave the team over family reasons. They later attempted to sign Tyson Chandler, but he declined the team's offer. In his debut, Chandler scored 43 points along with 22 rebounds and 4 assists in 50 minutes in a 118–115 double overtime win over Tianjin Ronggang. He followed his debut performance by recording 28 points, 12 rebounds and 2 assists against Qingdao DoubleStar in a 111–94 win. Chandler recorded 42 points, 10 rebounds and 3 steals in Zhejiang Guangsha's first loss against the Shandong Lions. With the help of Chandler, the Lions ended up reaching the playoffs to play against the Beijing Ducks in the first round. Unfortunately, he didn't participate in the playoffs, and as a result, Zhejiang was swept by Beijing.

=== Return to Denver (2012–2018) ===
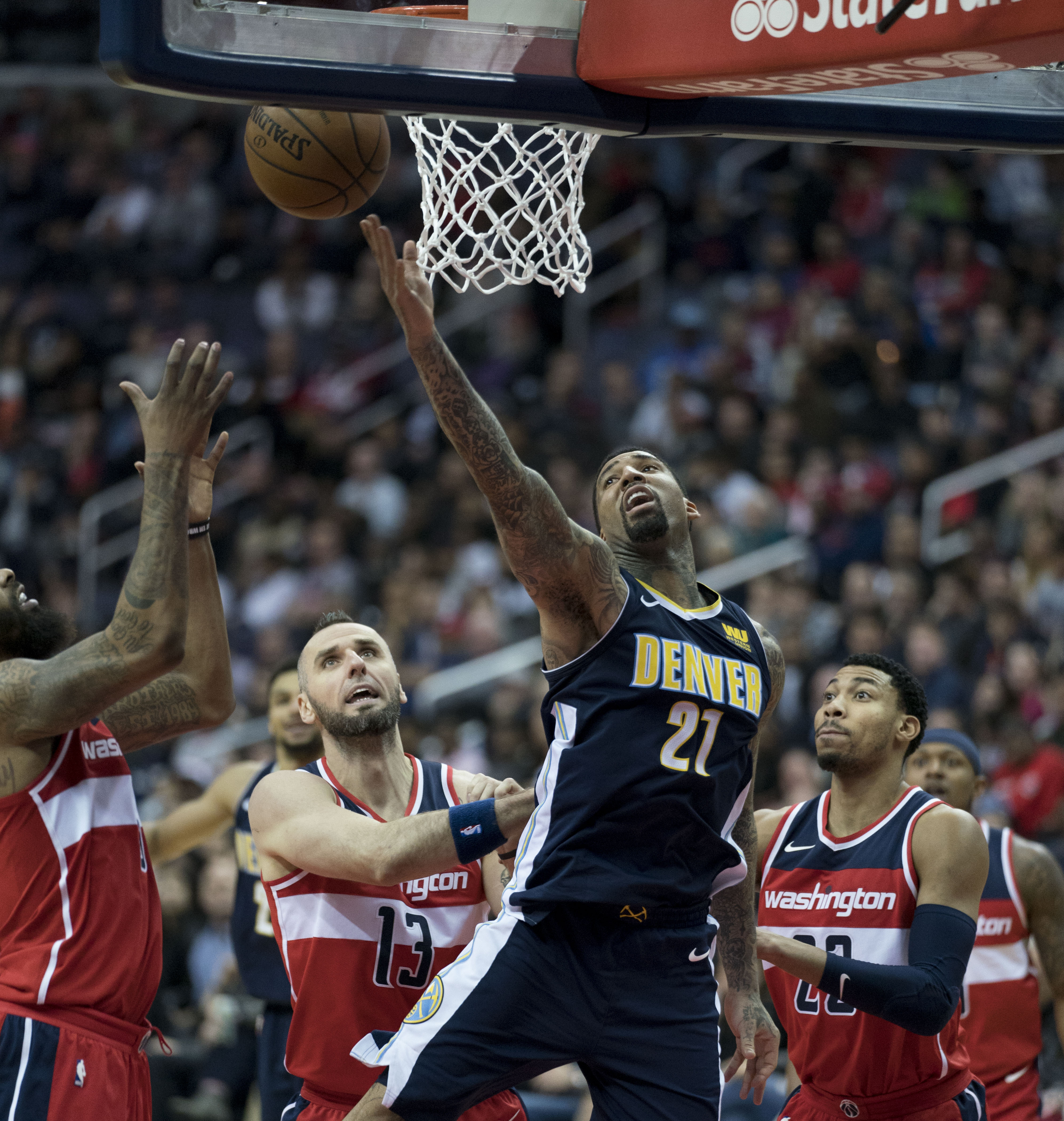
Chandler with the Nuggets in March 2018

After Zhejiang was swept in the playoffs, Chandler was able to re-sign with the Nuggets, thus returning to the NBA. On March 18, 2012, Chandler signed a contract with the Denver Nuggets reportedly worth $37 million for 5 years. However, his season would then rapidly come to an end after playing only 8 games for the Nuggets, as he suffered a labral tear in his left hip and had to undergo surgery, which also made him unable to participate in the playoffs.

On July 11, 2015, Chandler signed a multi-year contract extension with the Nuggets. On November 11, 2015, he was ruled out for the entire 2015–16 season after requiring surgery to repair a labral tear in his right hip.

On March 7, 2017, Chandler scored a career-best 36 points in a 108–96 win over the Sacramento Kings.

=== Philadelphia 76ers (2018–2019) ===
On July 6, 2018, Chandler and a future second-round draft pick were traded to the Philadelphia 76ers in exchange for cash considerations. He missed the first nine games of the 2018–19 season with a hamstring injury, making his debut on November 3 against the Detroit Pistons, going scoreless with four rebounds in 10 minutes.

=== Los Angeles Clippers (2019) ===
On February 6, 2019, Chandler was traded, along with Mike Muscala, Landry Shamet and a number of future draft picks, to the Los Angeles Clippers in exchange for Tobias Harris, Boban Marjanović and Mike Scott.

=== Brooklyn Nets (2019–2020) ===
On July 8, 2019, Chandler signed with the Brooklyn Nets on a one-year, veteran minimum contract. On August 29, Chandler was suspended by the NBA for 25 games for use of performance-enhancing drugs (PED). He was flagged for Ipamorelin, a growth hormone that has been on the NBA's list of banned substances since 2016. During his treatment for a quadriceps injury sustained during the 2018–19 season, Chandler was given small doses of the drug by his personal physician. Chandler returned from his suspension and made his season debut with the Nets on December 15 in a 109–89 win against the Philadelphia 76ers.

=== Return to Zhejiang (2020) ===
On September 8, 2020, it was reported that Chandler had returned to the Zhejiang Guangsha Lions.

== Career statistics ==
Legend
GP	Games played	GS	Games started	MPG	Minutes per game
FG%	Field goal percentage	3P%	3-point field goal percentage	FT%	Free throw percentage
RPG	Rebounds per game	APG	Assists per game	SPG	Steals per game
BPG	Blocks per game	PPG	Points per game	**Bold**	Career high
*	Led the league

=== NBA ===
==== Regular season ====
Year	Team	GP	GS	MPG	FG%	3P%	FT%	RPG	APG	SPG	BPG	PPG
2007–08	New York	35	16	19.6	.438	.300	.630	3.6	.9	.4	.5	7.3
2008–09	New York	**82***	70	33.4	.432	.328	.795	5.4	**2.1**	.9	.9	14.4
2009–10	New York	65	64	**35.7**	**.479**	.267	.806	5.4	**2.1**	.7	.8	15.3
2010–11	New York	51	30	34.5	.461	.351	.807	5.9	1.7	.7	**1.4**	**16.4**
2010–11	Denver	21	19	30.6	.419	.347	.810	5.0	1.6	.7	1.1	12.5
2011–12	Denver	8	6	26.9	.392	.250	.833	5.1	**2.1**	.8	.8	9.4
2012–13	Denver	43	8	25.1	.462	**.413**	.793	5.1	1.3	**1.0**	.3	13.0
2013–14	Denver	62	55	31.1	.416	.348	.724	4.7	1.8	.7	.5	13.6
2014–15	Denver	78	**75**	31.7	.429	.342	.775	6.1	1.7	.7	.4	13.9
2016–17	Denver	71	33	30.9	.461	.337	.727	**6.5**	2.0	.7	.4	15.7
2017–18	Denver	74	71	31.7	.445	.358	.772	5.4	**2.1**	.6	.5	10.0
2018–19	Philadelphia	36	32	26.4	.440	.390	.722	4.7	2.0	.6	.5	6.7
2018–19	L.A. Clippers	15	1	15.1	.348	.325	.714	3.1	.7	.2	.2	4.3
2019–20	Brooklyn	35	3	21.0	.404	.306	**.870**	4.1	1.1	.5	.3	5.9
Career		676	483	30.0	.443	.341	.770	5.3	1.8	.7	.6	12.5

==== Playoffs ====
Year	Team	GP	GS	MPG	FG%	3P%	FT%	RPG	APG	SPG	BPG	PPG
2011	Denver	5	2	23.0	.276	.143	.778	4.4	.4	.6	**.8**	4.8
2013	Denver	**6**	**6**	**34.2**	**.355**	**.310**	.750	**5.5**	**1.3**	**1.3**	.5	**12.0**
2019	L.A. Clippers	4	0	13.0	.313	.100	**1.000**	1.5	.5	.5	.0	3.8
Career		15	8	24.8	.331	.239	.800	4.1	.8	.9	.5	7.4

=== CBA ===
Year	Team	GP	GS	MPG	FG%	3P%	FT%	RPG	APG	SPG	BPG	PPG
2011–12	Zhejiang	32	29	34.6	.514	.291	.763	11.6	2.3	1.4	0.8	26.6
2020–21	Zhejiang	3	3	21.0	.500	.348	.667	7.7	1.7	1.0	0.7	15.3

=== College ===
Year	Team	GP	GS	MPG	FG%	3P%	FT%	RPG	APG	SPG	BPG	PPG
2005–06	DePaul	25	20	30.2	.436	.211	**.667**	**7.2**	1.0	**.8**	**1.6**	10.6
2006–07	DePaul	**34**	**32**	**31.7**	**.450**	**.333**	.654	6.9	**1.4**	.6	1.4	**14.6**
Career		59	52	31.1	.445	.303	.659	7.1	1.2	.7	1.5	12.9

== See also ==
- List of people banned or suspended by the NBA
