= 2008–09 New York Knicks season =

Season of National Basketball Association team the New York Knicks

- Head coach: Mike D'Antoni
- President: Donnie Walsh
- General manager: Donnie Walsh
- Owner: Cablevision
- Arena: Madison Square Garden

Results
- Record: 32–50 (.390)
- Place: Division: 3rd (Atlantic); Conference: 11th (Eastern)
- Playoff finish: Did not qualify
- Stats at Basketball Reference

Local media
- Television: MSG Network, MSG Plus
- Radio: WEPN

The 2008–09 New York Knicks season was the 63rd season of the franchise in the National Basketball Association (NBA).

== Key dates ==
- Patrick Ewing was selected for induction into the Naismith Memorial Basketball Hall of Fame in early September. Ewing headlined a class that included fellow legends Hakeem Olajuwon, former Knicks coach Pat Riley, Adrian Dantley, Cathy Rush, Dick Vitale and Bill Davidson.
- June 26: The 2008 NBA draft took place in New York City.
- July 1: Start of free agency period.
- November 21: Mardy Collins and Zach Randolph traded to Los Angeles Clippers for Tim Thomas and Cuttino Mobley. Traded Jamal Crawford to Golden State Warriors for Al Harrington.
- February 19: Traded Jerome James, Anthony Roberson and Tim Thomas to Chicago Bulls for Larry Hughes. Traded Malik Rose to Oklahoma City Thunder for Chris Wilcox.
- February 25: Waived Stephon Marbury.

== Draft ==
Round	Pick	Player	Position(s)	Nationality	College / Club
1	6	Danilo Gallinari	SF/PF	Italy	Olimpia Milano (Italy)

== Roster ==
2008–09 New York Knicks roster
Players

Pos.	No.	Player	Height	Weight	DOB	From
F	21	Wilson Chandler	6 ft 8 in (2.03 m)	220 lb (100 kg)	1987-05-10	DePaul
G/F	5	Joe Crawford	6 ft 5 in (1.96 m)	207 lb (94 kg)	1986-06-17	Kentucky
C	34	Eddy Curry	6 ft 11 in (2.11 m)	285 lb (129 kg)	1982-12-05	Thornwood HS (IL)
G	1	Chris Duhon	6 ft 1 in (1.85 m)	185 lb (84 kg)	1982-08-31	Duke
F	8	Danilo Gallinari (injured)	6 ft 10 in (2.08 m)	225 lb (102 kg)	1988-08-08	Italy
F	7	Al Harrington	6 ft 9 in (2.06 m)	250 lb (113 kg)	1980-02-17	St. Patrick HS (NJ)
G	0	Larry Hughes	6 ft 5 in (1.96 m)	185 lb (84 kg)	1979-01-23	Saint Louis
F/C	31	Chris Hunter	6 ft 11 in (2.11 m)	240 lb (109 kg)	1984-07-07	Michigan
F	20	Jared Jeffries	6 ft 11 in (2.11 m)	240 lb (109 kg)	1981-11-25	Indiana
F/C	42	David Lee	6 ft 9 in (2.06 m)	240 lb (109 kg)	1983-04-29	Florida
G	32	Cuttino Mobley (injured)	6 ft 4 in (1.93 m)	215 lb (98 kg)	1975-09-01	Rhode Island
G/F	23	Quentin Richardson	6 ft 6 in (1.98 m)	235 lb (107 kg)	1980-04-13	DePaul
G	4	Nate Robinson	5 ft 9 in (1.75 m)	180 lb (82 kg)	1984-05-31	Washington
C	18	Mouhamed Sene	6 ft 11 in (2.11 m)	230 lb (104 kg)	1986-05-12	Senegal
F/C	9	Chris Wilcox	6 ft 10 in (2.08 m)	235 lb (107 kg)	1982-09-03	Maryland

Coaches
Head coach
- Mike D'Antoni
Assistant(s)
- Kenny Atkinson
- Greg Brittenham
- Dan D'Antoni
- Phil Weber
- Herb Williams

Legend
- (DP) Unsigned draft pick
- (FA) Free agent
- (S) Suspended
- Injured

Roster
Updated: February 19, 2009

== Standings ==
Atlantic Division	W	L	PCT	GB	Home	Road	Div
y-Boston Celtics	62	20	.756	—	35–6	27–14	15–1
x-Philadelphia 76ers	41	41	.500	21	24–17	17–24	6–10
New Jersey Nets	34	48	.415	28	19–22	15–26	8–8
Toronto Raptors	33	49	.402	29	18–23	15–26	6–10
New York Knicks	32	50	.390	30	20–21	12–29	5–11

#	Eastern Conference				
#	Team	W	L	PCT	GB
1	z-Cleveland Cavaliers	66	16	.805	—
2	y-Boston Celtics	62	20	.756	4
3	y-Orlando Magic	59	23	.720	7
4	x-Atlanta Hawks	47	35	.573	19
5	x-Miami Heat	43	39	.524	23
6	x-Philadelphia 76ers	41	41	.500	25
7	x-Chicago Bulls	41	41	.500	25
8	x-Detroit Pistons	39	43	.476	27
9	Indiana Pacers	36	46	.439	30
10	Charlotte Bobcats	35	47	.427	31
11	New Jersey Nets	34	48	.415	32
12	Milwaukee Bucks	34	48	.415	32
13	Toronto Raptors	33	49	.402	33
14	New York Knicks	32	50	.390	34
15	Washington Wizards	19	63	.232	47

== Game log ==
2008–09 game log
Total: 32–50 (Home: 20–21; Road: 12–29)
October: 1–1 (home: 1–0; road: 0–1)

Game	Date	Team	Score	High points	High rebounds	High assists	Location Attendance	Record
1	October 29	Miami	W 120–115	Jamal Crawford (29)	David Lee (11)	Nate Robinson (7)	Madison Square Garden; 19,763	1–0
2	October 31	@ Philadelphia	L 87–116	Jamal Crawford (14)	David Lee (11)	Chris Duhon (7)	Wachovia Center; 11,717	1–1

November: 7–7 (home: 5–3; road: 2–4)

Game	Date	Team	Score	High points	High rebounds	High assists	Location Attendance	Record
3	November 2	Milwaukee	L 86–94	Quentin Richardson (28)	Zach Randolph (13)	Nate Robinson, Jamal Crawford (4)	Madison Square Garden; 18,190	1–2
4	November 5	Charlotte	W 101–98	Zach Randolph (25)	Zach Randolph (13)	Chris Duhon (6)	Madison Square Garden; 17,977	2–2
5	November 7	@ Washington	W 114–108	Jamal Crawford (23)	Zach Randolph (13)	Chris Duhon (12)	Verizon Center; 20,173	3–2
6	November 9	Utah	W 107–99	Jamal Crawford (32)	Zach Randolph (14)	Chris Duhon (9)	Madison Square Garden; 19,344	4–2
7	November 11	@ San Antonio	L 80–92	Jamal Crawford (28)	Zach Randolph (13)	Chris Duhon (7)	AT&T Center; 16,569	4–3
8	November 12	@ Memphis	W 132–103	Wilson Chandler (27)	Zach Randolph (10)	Jamal Crawford (8)	FedExForum; 10,129	5–3
9	November 14	Oklahoma City	W 116–106	Jamal Crawford, Zach Randolph (29)	Zach Randolph (19)	Chris Duhon (8)	Madison Square Garden; 18,008	6–3
10	November 16	Dallas	L 114–124 (OT)	Zach Randolph (27)	Zach Randolph (18)	Chris Duhon (12)	Madison Square Garden; 19,271	6–4
11	November 18	@ Boston	L 101–110	Wilson Chandler (23)	Zach Randolph (8)	Chris Duhon (5)	TD Banknorth Garden; 18,624	6–5
12	November 21	@ Milwaukee	L 87–104	Chris Duhon (20)	David Lee (12)	Chris Duhon, Nate Robinson, Wilson Chandler (4)	Bradley Center; 14,898	6–6
13	November 22	Washington	W 122–117	Quentin Richardson (34)	Quentin Richardson, David Lee (12)	Chris Duhon (11)	Madison Square Garden; 19,763	7–6
14	November 25	Cleveland	L 101–119	Quentin Richardson (22)	David Lee (13)	Chris Duhon (6)	Madison Square Garden; 19,763	7–7
15	November 26	@ Detroit	L 96–110	Al Harrington (25)	David Lee (15)	Chris Duhon (9)	The Palace of Auburn Hills; 22,076	7–8
16	November 29	Golden State	W 138–125	David Lee (37)	David Lee (21)	Chris Duhon (22)	Madison Square Garden; 19,317	8–8

December: 4–10 (home: 1–4; road: 3–6)

Game	Date	Team	Score	High points	High rebounds	High assists	Location Attendance	Record
17	December 2	Portland	L 97–104	Chris Duhon (23)	David Lee (12)	Chris Duhon (13)	Madison Square Garden; 18,664	8–9
18	December 3	@ Cleveland	L 82–118	Al Harrington (20)	David Lee (16)	Anthony Roberson, Chris Duhon (4)	Quicken Loans Arena; 20,562	8–10
19	December 5	@ Atlanta	L 95–98	Al Harrington (27)	David Lee (11)	Chris Duhon (8)	Philips Arena; 16,366	8–11
20	December 7	Detroit	W 104–92	Chris Duhon (25)	David Lee (19)	Chris Duhon (9)	Madison Square Garden; 19,763	9–11
21	December 9	@ Chicago	L 100–105	Al Harrington (28)	David Lee (15)	Chris Duhon (14)	United Center; 19,519	9–12
22	December 10	@ New Jersey	W 121–109	Al Harrington (39)	Al Harrington (13)	Chris Duhon (10)	Izod Center; 16,722	10–12
23	December 13	@ Sacramento	W 114–90	Al Harrington (33)	David Lee (19)	Chris Duhon (5)	ARCO Arena; 12,155	11–12
24	December 15	@ Phoenix	L 103–111	Nate Robinson (27)	David Lee (12)	Chris Duhon (9)	US Airways Center; 18,422	11–13
25	December 16	@ L.A. Lakers	L 114–116	Nate Robinson (33)	David Lee (14)	Chris Duhon (11)	Staples Center; 18,997	11–14
26	December 19	Milwaukee	L 81–105	Nate Robinson (21)	David Lee (14)	Chris Duhon (7)	Madison Square Garden; 19,009	11–15
27	December 21	@ Boston	L 105–124	Quentin Richardson (29)	David Lee (8)	Chris Duhon (10)	TD Banknorth Garden; 18,624	11–16
28	December 26	Minnesota	L 107–120	Al Harrington, Nate Robinson (26)	David Lee (13)	Chris Duhon (5)	Madison Square Garden; 19,763	11–17
29	December 28	Denver	L 110–117	Nate Robinson (20)	David Lee (12)	Chris Duhon (11)	Madison Square Garden; 19,763	11–18
30	December 30	@ Charlotte	W 93–89	Wilson Chandler (19)	David Lee (16)	Chris Duhon (8)	Time Warner Cable Arena; 15,108	12–18

January: 9–7 (home: 7–2; road: 2–5)

Game	Date	Team	Score	High points	High rebounds	High assists	Location Attendance	Record
31	January 2	Indiana	L 103–105	Al Harrington (27)	David Lee (11)	Chris Duhon (7)	Madison Square Garden; 19,763	12–19
32	January 4	Boston	W 100–88	Wilson Chandler (31)	David Lee (14)	Chris Duhon (5)	Madison Square Garden; 19,763	13–19
33	January 6	@ Oklahoma City	L 99–107	Al Harrington (21)	David Lee (13)	Chris Duhon (6)	Ford Center; 18,487	13–20
34	January 8	@ Dallas	L 94–99	Chris Duhon (24)	David Lee (15)	Chris Duhon (7)	American Airlines Center; 19,779	13–21
35	January 10	@ Houston	L 76–96	Tim Thomas (18)	David Lee (11)	Chris Duhon (6)	Toyota Center; 18,280	13–22
36	January 12	@ New Orleans	W 101–95	David Lee (24)	Al Harrington (10)	Chris Duhon (9)	New Orleans Arena; 16,177	14–22
37	January 14	Washington	W 128–122	David Lee (30)	David Lee (10)	Chris Duhon (9)	Madison Square Garden; 18,020	15–22
38	January 16	@ Washington	L 89–96	Al Harrington (18)	David Lee (21)	Chris Duhon (8)	Verizon Center; 17,526	15–23
39	January 17	Philadelphia	L 97–107	Al Harrington (26)	David Lee (11)	Nate Robinson (7)	Madison Square Garden; 19,408	15–24
40	January 19	Chicago	W 102–98	Quentin Richardson (24)	David Lee (10)	Chris Duhon, Nate Robinson, David Lee (3)	Madison Square Garden; 18,807	16–24
41	January 21	Phoenix	W 114–109	David Lee (25)	David Lee (16)	Chris Duhon (7)	Madison Square Garden; 19,256	17–24
42	January 23	Memphis	W 108–88	David Lee (19)	David Lee (14)	Chris Duhon (7)	Madison Square Garden; 18,391	18–24
43	January 24	@ Philadelphia	L 110–116	Nate Robinson (26)	David Lee (10)	Nate Robinson (6)	Wachovia Center; 19,239	18–25
44	January 26	Houston	W 104–98	Nate Robinson (19)	David Lee (13)	Chris Duhon (11)	Madison Square Garden; 19,155	19–25
45	January 28	Atlanta	W 112–104	Nate Robinson (24)	David Lee (16)	Chris Duhon (11)	Madison Square Garden; 18,180	20–25
46	January 31	@ Indiana	W 122–113	Al Harrington (31)	David Lee (17)	Chris Duhon (7)	Conseco Fieldhouse; 15,067	21–25

February: 3–10 (home: 3–5; road: 0–5)

Game	Date	Team	Score	High points	High rebounds	High assists	Location Attendance	Record
47	February 2	L.A. Lakers	L 117–126	Al Harrington (24)	David Lee (12)	Chris Duhon (9)	Madison Square Garden; 19,763	21–26
48	February 4	Cleveland	L 102–107	Al Harrington (39)	Al Harrington (13)	Chris Duhon (5)	Madison Square Garden; 19,763	21–27
49	February 6	Boston	L 100–110	Al Harrington (27)	David Lee (18)	Chris Duhon (7)	Madison Square Garden; 19,763	21–28
50	February 8	@ Portland	L 108–109	David Lee (29)	David Lee (11)	Chris Duhon (10)	Rose Garden; 20,609	21–29
51	February 10	@ Golden State	L 127–144	Nate Robinson (30)	David Lee (11)	Chris Duhon (9)	Oracle Arena; 19,098	21–30
52	February 11	@ L.A. Clippers	L 124–128 (OT)	Nate Robinson (33)	David Lee (12)	Nate Robinson (15)	Staples Center; 16,928	21–31
53	February 17	San Antonio	W 112–107 (OT)	Nate Robinson (32)	David Lee (12)	Chris Duhon (8)	Madison Square Garden; 19,763	22–31
54	February 20	Toronto	W 127–97	Wilson Chandler (32)	David Lee (15)	Nate Robinson (7)	Madison Square Garden; 19,763	23–31
55	February 22	@ Toronto	L 100–111	Al Harrington (31)	David Lee (15)	Nate Robinson (8)	Air Canada Centre; 19,800	23–32
56	February 23	Indiana	W 123–119	Nate Robinson (41)	David Lee (13)	Chris Duhon (5)	Madison Square Garden; 17,283	24–32
57	February 25	Orlando	L 109–114	Nate Robinson (32)	David Lee (10)	Chris Duhon (10)	Madison Square Garden; 19,763	24–33
58	February 27	Philadelphia	L 103–108	Larry Hughes (25)	David Lee (11)	Chris Duhon (6)	Madison Square Garden; 19,763	24–34
59	February 28	@ Miami	L 115–120	Nate Robinson (29)	David Lee (13)	Chris Duhon (9)	American Airlines Arena; 19,600	24–35

March: 5–11 (home: 2–5; road: 3–6)

Game	Date	Team	Score	High points	High rebounds	High assists	Location Attendance	Record
60	March 4	Atlanta	W 109–105	Larry Hughes (23)	David Lee (14)	Chris Duhon (5)	Madison Square Garden; 18,931	25–35
61	March 7	Charlotte	L 105–114	Al Harrington (24)	Quentin Richardson (9)	Nate Robinson, Larry Hughes (4)	Madison Square Garden; 19,763	25–36
62	March 8	@ New Jersey	L 101–106	David Lee (19)	David Lee (14)	David Lee (7)	Izod Center; 18,846	25–37
63	March 10	@ Milwaukee	W 120–112	Larry Hughes (39)	David Lee (18)	Nate Robinson (7)	Bradley Center; 13,781	26–37
64	March 11	@ Detroit	W 116–111 (OT)	Nate Robinson (30)	David Lee (18)	Nate Robinson (6)	The Palace of Auburn Hills; 20,135	27–37
65	March 13	@ Minnesota	W 102–94	Nate Robinson (25)	David Lee (13)	Nate Robinson (7)	Target Center; 14,311	28–37
66	March 15	@ Cleveland	L 93–98	Al Harrington (26)	David Lee (14)	Nate Robinson (7)	Quicken Loans Arena; 20,562	28–38
67	March 18	New Jersey	L 89–115	Al Harrington (21)	Wilson Chandler (10)	Larry Hughes (5)	Madison Square Garden; 19,763	28–39
68	March 20	Sacramento	L 94–121	Nate Robinson (19)	Chris Wilcox (9)	Nate Robinson, Wilson Chandler (3)	Madison Square Garden; 19,763	28–40
69	March 21	@ Orlando	L 103–110	Quentin Richardson (33)	Wilson Chandler (12)	Nate Robinson, Jared Jeffries, Wilson Chandler, Al Harrington (3)	Amway Arena; 17,461	28–41
70	March 23	Orlando	L 102–106	Nate Robinson (19)	David Lee (13)	Nate Robinson (6)	Madison Square Garden; 19,763	28–42
71	March 25	L.A. Clippers	L 135–140 (OT)	Al Harrington (38)	David Lee (13)	Chris Duhon (10)	Madison Square Garden; 19,041	28–43
72	March 27	New Orleans	W 103–93	Al Harrington (23)	David Lee (11)	Chris Duhon (7)	Madison Square Garden; 19,763	29–43
73	March 28	@ Charlotte	L 85–96	Al Harrington, Wilson Chandler (18)	David Lee (10)	Chris Duhon (8)	Time Warner Cable Arena; 19,133	29–44
74	March 30	@ Utah	L 104–112	Al Harrington (24)	David Lee (10)	Chris Duhon (7)	EnergySolutions Arena; 19,911	29–45
75	March 31	@ Denver	L 104–111	Nate Robinson (30)	David Lee (12)	Chris Duhon (11)	Pepsi Center; 17,851	29–46

April: 3–4 (home: 1–2; road: 2–2)

Game	Date	Team	Score	High points	High rebounds	High assists	Location Attendance	Record
76	April 4	Toronto	L 95–102	Al Harrington, Chris Duhon (22)	Al Harrington, David Lee (7)	David Lee (6)	Madison Square Garden; 19,763	29–47
77	April 5	@ Toronto	W 112–103	Wilson Chandler (17)	David Lee, Al Harrington (10)	Nate Robinson (7)	Air Canada Centre; 18,879	30–47
78	April 7	@ Chicago	L 103–110	Wilson Chandler (26)	David Lee (13)	David Lee, Chris Duhon (6)	United Center; 20,764	30–48
79	April 8	Detroit	L 86–113	Al Harrington (26)	Wilson Chandler (8)	Nate Robinson, Chris Duhon (4)	Madison Square Garden; 19,763	30–49
80	April 10	@ Orlando	W 105–95	Al Harrington (27)	David Lee (16)	Chris Duhon, Al Harrington, David Lee (4)	Amway Arena; 17,461	31–49
81	April 12	@ Miami	L 105–122	Wilson Chandler, Al Harrington (21)	David Lee (11)	Larry Hughes, Nate Robinson (4)	American Airlines Arena; 19,600	31–50
82	April 15	New Jersey	W 102–73	Wilson Chandler (16)	David Lee (12)	Chris Duhon (6)	Madison Square Garden; 19,763	32–50

2008–09 season schedule

== Player statistics ==
Legend
GP	Games played	GS	Games started	MPG	Minutes per game
FG%	Field-goal percentage	3P%	3-point field-goal percentage	FT%	Free-throw percentage
RPG	Rebounds per game	APG	Assists per game	SPG	Steals per game
BPG	Blocks per game	PPG	Points per game

=== Regular season ===
New York Knicks statistics
Player	GP	GS	MPG	FG%	3P%	FT%	RPG	APG	SPG	BPG	PPG
Wilson Chandler	82	70	33.4	.431	.328	.795	5.4	2.1	.9	.9	14.4
Mardy Collins^{†}	9	0	8.3	.348	.000	.444	.9	1.1	.2	.0	2.2
Jamal Crawford^{†}	11	11	35.6	.432	.455	.761	1.5	4.4	.8	.0	19.6
Joe Crawford	2	0	11.5	.300	.250	1.000	2.0	.5	.5	.0	4.5
Eddy Curry	3	0	4.0	1.000	.000	.333	1.3	.0	.0	.0	1.7
Chris Duhon	79	78	36.8	.422	.391	.856	3.1	7.2	.9	.1	11.1
Danilo Gallinari	28	2	14.7	.448	.444	.963	2.0	.5	.5	.1	6.1
Al Harrington^{†}	68	51	35.0	.446	.362	.804	6.3	1.4	1.2	.3	20.7
Larry Hughes^{†}	25	14	27.5	.390	.385	.794	2.6	2.4	1.4	.2	11.2
Jerome James	2	0	5.0	.375	.000	.000	1.5	.0	.5	.5	3.0
Jared Jeffries	56	36	23.4	.440	.083	.611	4.1	1.4	.8	.6	5.3
David Lee	81	74	34.9	.549	.000	.755	11.7	2.1	1.0	.3	16.0
Demetris Nichols^{†}	2	0	4.5	.400	.000	.500	1.0	.0	.0	.5	2.5
Zach Randolph^{†}	11	11	35.3	.434	.292	.821	12.5	1.4	1.2	.3	20.5
Quentin Richardson	72	51	26.3	.393	.365	.761	4.4	1.6	.7	.1	10.2
Anthony Roberson^{†}	23	0	11.0	.379	.338	1.000	.7	.8	.4	.0	4.7
Nate Robinson	74	11	29.9	.437	.326	.841	3.9	4.1	1.3	.1	17.2
Malik Rose^{†}	18	0	8.9	.268	.000	.727	1.7	.6	.1	.1	1.7
Cheikh Samb^{†}	2	0	4.0	.000	.000	.000	1.0	.0	.0	.0	.0
Mouhamed Sene^{†}	1	0	6.0	.500	.000	1.000	5.0	.0	.0	1.0	3.0
Courtney Sims^{†}	1	0	11.0	.500	.000	.000	4.0	.0	.0	.0	6.0
Tim Thomas^{†}	36	1	21.5	.461	.421	.806	3.1	1.3	.6	.3	9.6
Chris Wilcox^{†}	25	0	13.2	.529	.000	.509	3.3	.6	.3	.2	5.4

- ^{†} Denotes player spent time with another team in the season. Stats reflect time with the Knicks only.

== Transactions ==
=== Trades ===
July 28, 2008	To Denver Nuggets Renaldo Balkman	To New York Knicks Taurean Green; Bobby Jones; 2010 second round draft pick
August 29, 2008	To Houston Rockets Frédéric Weis	To New York Knicks Patrick Ewing Jr.
November 21, 2008	To Golden State Warriors Jamal Crawford	To New York Knicks Al Harrington
November 21, 2008	To Los Angeles Clippers Zach Randolph; Mardy Collins	To New York Knicks Tim Thomas; Cuttino Mobley
February 19, 2009	To Chicago Bulls Jerome James; Anthony Roberson; Tim Thomas	To New York Knicks Larry Hughes
February 19, 2009	To Oklahoma City Thunder Malik Rose	To New York Knicks Chris Wilcox

=== Free agents ===
==== Additions ====
Player	Date signed	Former team
Chris Duhon	July 4	Chicago Bulls
Anthony Roberson	July 16	TTNet Beykoz
Cheikh Samb	March 2	Los Angeles Clippers
Mouhamed Sene	April 9	Oklahoma City Thunder

==== Subtractions ====
Player	Left	New team
Stephon Marbury	February 27	Boston Celtics

== See also ==
- 2008–09 NBA season
