= Larry Hughes =

American basketball player (born 1979)

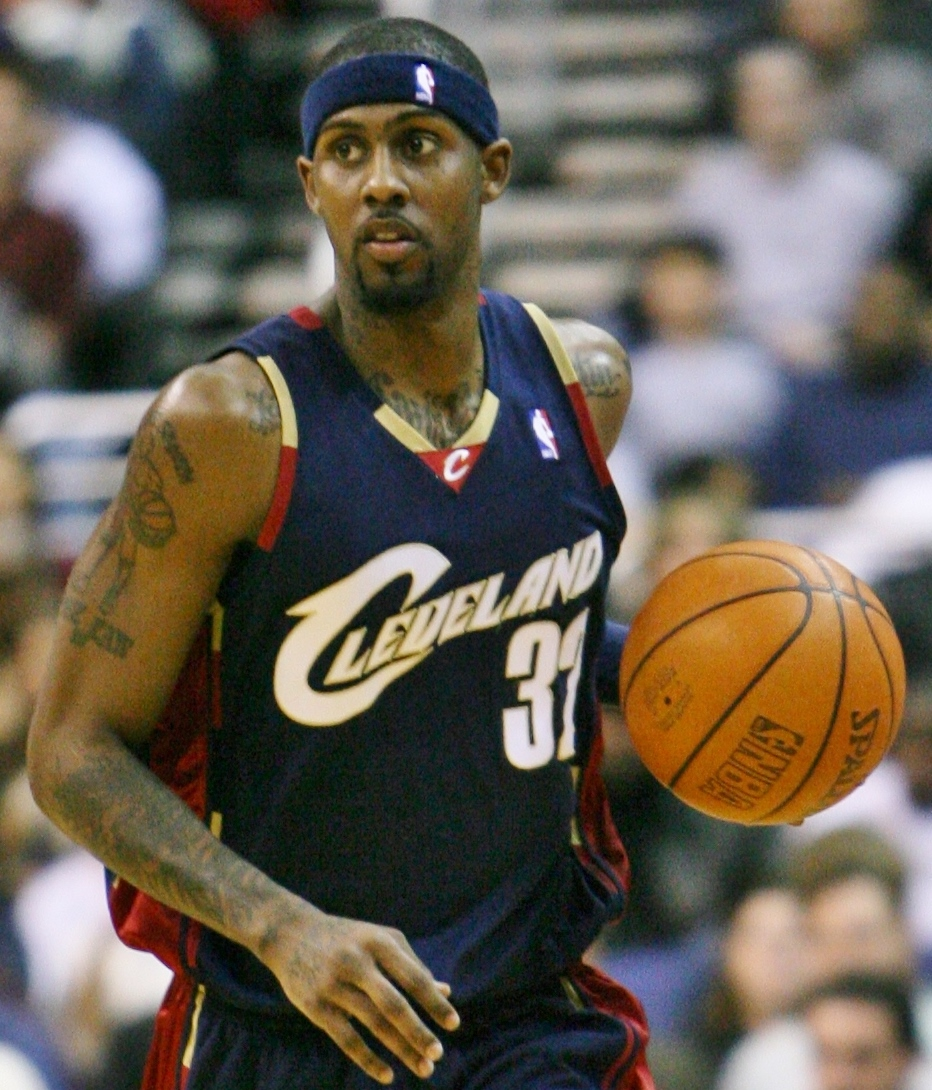
- Hughes with the Cleveland Cavaliers in 2007

Personal information
- Born: January 23, 1979 (age 47) St. Louis, Missouri, U.S.
- Listed height: 6 ft 5 in (1.96 m)
- Listed weight: 185 lb (84 kg)

Career information
- High school: Christian Brothers College HS (St. Louis, Missouri)
- College: Saint Louis (1997–1998)
- NBA draft: 1998: 1st round, 8th overall pick
- Drafted by: Philadelphia 76ers
- Playing career: 1998–2012
- Position: Shooting guard
- Number: 21, 20, 32, 0

Career history
- 1998–2000: Philadelphia 76ers
- 2000–2002: Golden State Warriors
- 2002–2005: Washington Wizards
- 2005–2008: Cleveland Cavaliers
- 2008–2009: Chicago Bulls
- 2009–2010: New York Knicks
- 2010: Charlotte Bobcats
- 2011–2012: Orlando Magic

Career highlights
- NBA All-Defensive First Team (2005); NBA steals leader (2005); USBWA National Freshman of the Year (1998); First-team All-Conference USA (1998); McDonald's All-American (1997); Second-team Parade All-American (1997); Mr. Show-Me Basketball (1997)

Career statistics
- Points: 10,242 (14.1 ppg)
- Rebounds: 3,039 (4.2 rpg)
- Assists: 2,290 (3.1 apg)
- Stats at NBA.com
- Stats at Basketball Reference

Larry Darnell Hughes Sr. (born January 23, 1979) is an American former professional basketball player. Hughes played for eight different teams during his 14-year career in the National Basketball Association (NBA). Hughes played collegiately for the Saint Louis Billikens for one season before being selected with the eighth overall pick in the 1998 NBA draft. Hughes is the founder of the Larry Hughes Basketball Academy.

== Early years ==
One of the most heralded basketball players to come out of St. Louis, Hughes started his basketball career at Christian Brothers College High School (CBC), which won the Missouri state championship in 1997. He also led the St. Louis Eagles to an AAU National Championship, the summer prior. He played in the 1997 McDonald's American Game scoring 21 points.

Hughes played one season of college basketball at Saint Louis University. He finished the 1997–98 season with per game averages of 20.9 points, 5.1 rebounds, 2.4 assists, and 2.16 steals. He led the Billikens to the NCAA Tournament that year, making it to the second round after a win over University of Massachusetts.

== NBA career ==
Hughes has played for the Philadelphia 76ers, Golden State Warriors, Washington Wizards, Cleveland Cavaliers, Chicago Bulls, New York Knicks, Sacramento Kings, Charlotte Bobcats, and Orlando Magic. He was drafted by Philadelphia in the 1st round of the 1998 NBA draft out of Saint Louis University, where he was named Freshman of the Year. He was known for being a versatile and athletic guard with strong defensive abilities. During his 76ers tenure, he and fellow guard Allen Iverson were nicknamed "the Flight Brothers", for their above-the-rim play style. He was selected to the 2004–05 NBA All-Defensive 1st Team as a member of the Wizards. He led the league in steals per game with 2.89 in 2004–05.

Hughes participated in the 2000 Slam Dunk Contest in Oracle Arena (home of the Golden State Warriors) in Oakland, California. During the 2000 trade deadline, Hughes was traded to the Warriors with Billy Owens in a three-team deal that sent Toni Kukoč from the Chicago Bulls to the 76ers. In 2002, Hughes signed with the Washington Wizards.

Hughes signed a five-year $70 million contract with the Cleveland Cavaliers as a free agent in the summer of 2005. He was brought into Cleveland to provide assistance to young superstar LeBron James, the Cavs' first overall draft pick in 2003. In the 2005–06 season he helped LeBron and the Cavs to an 18–10 record before requiring surgery on his broken finger. His last performance before the injury came in a 97–84 home upset of the Detroit Pistons, in which he scored 16 points on 7–10 shooting to go with two steals, five rebounds and three assists.

Prior to injuries in 2005, he averaged 16.2 points, and 37.6 minutes per game. Both of those statistics were the second best on the team, to LeBron James. He has an ongoing rivalry with former backcourt partner Gilbert Arenas, with whom he played for three seasons, two in Washington and one in Golden State.

On May 2, 2006, Hughes was recipient of the inaugural Austin Carr Good Guy Award, designed to recognize the Cavaliers player who is cooperative and understanding of the media, the community and the public.

On February 21, 2008, Hughes was traded to the Chicago Bulls, in a three-team trade, along with Drew Gooden, Cedric Simmons and Shannon Brown in exchange for Ben Wallace and Joe Smith.

On February 19, 2009, just before the trade deadline, Hughes was traded from the Bulls to the New York Knicks for Tim Thomas, Jerome James, and Anthony Roberson.

On February 18, 2010, Hughes was traded to the Sacramento Kings in a three team deal that also moved Tracy McGrady to the Knicks. He was waived by the Kings on February 23, 2010. On March 13, 2010, he signed with the Charlotte Bobcats for the rest of the season.

On December 9, 2011, Hughes signed a non-guaranteed contract with the Orlando Magic. He was waived on February 1, 2012, after averaging 1.3 points in nine games.

Hughes was selected to play in Ice Cube's BIG3 League on the "Killer 3s" team in the summer of 2017.

== NBA career statistics ==
Legend
GP	Games played	GS	Games started	MPG	Minutes per game
FG%	Field goal percentage	3P%	3-point field goal percentage	FT%	Free throw percentage
RPG	Rebounds per game	APG	Assists per game	SPG	Steals per game
BPG	Blocks per game	PPG	Points per game	**Bold**	Career high
*	Led the league

=== Regular season ===
Year	Team	GP	GS	MPG	FG%	3P%	FT%	RPG	APG	SPG	BPG	PPG
1998–99	Philadelphia	50*	1	19.8	.411	.154	.709	3.8	1.5	.9	.3	10.0
1999–2000	Philadelphia	50	5	20.4	.416	.216	.746	3.2	1.5	1.1	.2	10.0
1999–2000	Golden State	32	32	**40.8**	.389	.243	.736	5.9	4.1	1.9	.5	**22.7**
2000–01	Golden State	50	45	36.9	.383	.187	.766	5.5	4.5	1.9	**.6**	16.5
2001–02	Golden State	**73**	56	28.1	.423	.194	.737	3.4	4.3	1.5	.3	12.3
2002–03	Washington	67	56	31.9	**.467**	.367	.731	4.6	3.1	1.3	.4	12.8
2003–04	Washington	61	61	33.8	.397	.341	.797	5.3	2.4	1.6	.4	18.8
2004–05	Washington	61	61	38.7	.430	.282	.777	**6.3**	**4.7**	**2.9***	.3	22.0
2005–06	Cleveland	36	31	35.6	.409	.368	.756	4.5	3.6	1.5	**.6**	15.5
2006–07	Cleveland	70	**68**	37.1	.400	.333	.676	3.8	3.7	1.3	.4	14.9
2007–08	Cleveland	40	32	30.3	.377	.341	.815	3.6	2.4	1.5	.3	12.3
2007–08	Chicago	28	25	28.9	.387	.353	.775	3.1	3.1	1.4	.2	12.0
2008–09	Chicago	30	6	26.4	.412	**.392**	.817	3.1	2.0	1.2	.3	12.0
2008–09	New York	25	14	27.5	.390	.385	.794	2.6	2.4	1.4	.2	11.2
2009–10	New York	31	14	26.5	.366	.289	.823	3.5	3.5	1.3	.4	9.6
2009–10	Charlotte	14	2	21.1	.327	.357	**.853**	2.3	2.0	.9	.3	8.1
2011–12	Orlando	9	0	12.7	.227	.143	.500	.6	.8	.2	.0	1.3
Career		727	509	30.8	.406	.309	.757	4.2	3.1	1.5	.4	14.1

=== Playoffs ===
Year	Team	GP	GS	MPG	FG%	3P%	FT%	RPG	APG	SPG	BPG	PPG
1999	Philadelphia	8	2	24.8	**.403**	.000	**.833**	4.6	2.0	1.9	**1.1**	10.3
2005	Washington	10	10	40.1	.376	.212	.831	**7.1**	3.7	2.0	.7	**20.7**
2006	Cleveland	9	8	37.3	.319	.278	.742	3.0	**4.0**	**2.2**	.1	11.1
2007	Cleveland	**18**	**18**	35.5	.347	.352	.746	3.9	2.4	1.4	.4	11.3
2010	Charlotte	4	0	14.5	**.471**	**.400**	.571	3.3	1.5	.0	.0	6.0
Career		49	38	33.3	.361	.287	.782	4.5	2.8	1.6	.5	12.6

== Personal life ==
Hughes played Kelly Rowland's boyfriend in the music video for Nelly's single "Dilemma".

In 2014, Hughes started a basketball clinic that later became known as the Larry Hughes Basketball Academy. Since 2019 it has operated out of a facility in Chesterfield as well as Fenton, Missouri.

In November 2020, Hughes announced plans to open two cannabis dispensaries in St. Louis with former Knicks teammate Al Harrington.

Hughes is the godfather of Boston Celtics player Jayson Tatum, whose father, Justin, was Hughes' high school and college teammate.

== See also ==
- List of NBA single-season steals per game leaders
