= Jerome James =

American basketball player (born 1975)

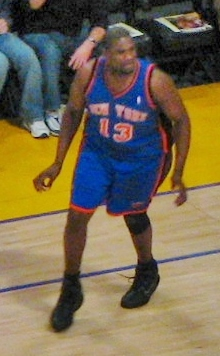
- James with the New York Knicks in 2007

Personal information
- Born: November 17, 1975 (age 50) Tampa, Florida, U.S.
- Listed height: 7 ft 1 in (2.16 m)
- Listed weight: 285 lb (129 kg)

Career information
- High school: Pentecostal Church of God Christian Academy (Winter Haven, Florida)
- College: Florida A&M (1995–1998)
- NBA draft: 1998: 2nd round, 36th overall pick
- Drafted by: Sacramento Kings
- Playing career: 1998–2015
- Position: Center
- Number: 53, 33, 13, 31

Career history
- 1998: Harlem Globetrotters
- 1999: Sacramento Kings
- 2000–2001: KK Budućnost
- 2001: ASVEL Villeurbanne
- 2001–2005: Seattle SuperSonics
- 2005–2009: New York Knicks
- 2012: Caciques de Humacao
- 2015: Atenienses de Manatí

Career highlights
- YUBA League champion (2001); NCAA blocks leader (1998); 2× First-team All-MEAC (1997, 1998)

Career NBA statistics
- Points: 1,540 (4.3 ppg)
- Rebounds: 1,099 (3.1 rpg)
- Blocks: 384 (1.1 bpg)
- Stats at NBA.com
- Stats at Basketball Reference

Jerome Keith James (born November 17, 1975) is an American former professional basketball player. Originally from Tampa, Florida, James played college basketball for the Florida A&M Rattlers for three seasons and was the national leader in blocks per game in the 1997–98 season, his junior year. James declared for the 1998 NBA draft after his junior year, and the Sacramento Kings selected James in the second round of the draft. Over the course of his career, he has played for the Kings, Seattle SuperSonics and New York Knicks. He has also played for KK Budućnost Podgorica and the Harlem Globetrotters.

== Early life and college years ==
James was born and raised in the neighborhood of Northview Hills Tampa, Florida, one of ten children. His father Jessie was a Port Of Tampa longshoreman and his mother Ruth, a Hillsborough County school teacher. After graduating from the Pentecostal Church of God Christian Academy of Winter Haven in 1993, James worked driving delivery trucks for Sunny Florida Dairy and also part-time at a local feed lot in the Tampa Bay Area and learned the meaning of hard work from his father. A friend of James's mother saw James playing pickup basketball at a community center and called Ron Brown, coach of the Florida A&M University Rattlers basketball team. Brown came and saw James's basketball skills and immediately offered James an athletic scholarship to Florida A&M.

James redshirted the 1994–95 season and played for Florida A&M from 1995 to 1998. In an interview with The Seattle Times, James said that meeting Shaquille O'Neal at an Orlando Magic practice inspired him to pursue a professional basketball career. With Florida A&M, James played 81 games with career averages of 16.0 points, 9.2 rebounds, and 4.48 blocks, with 49.5% on field goal attempts. In his junior season (1997–98), James led NCAA Division I basketball with 4.63 blocks per game. James was an All-MEAC selection in his sophomore and junior seasons. One class short of a pre-law degree, James declared for the 1998 NBA draft after his junior season.

== Professional career ==
=== Harlem Globetrotters and Sacramento Kings (1998–2000) ===
The Sacramento Kings selected James in the second round as the 36th overall pick in the 1998 NBA draft. Due to the NBA lockout, James played for the Harlem Globetrotters in the fall of 1998 in a nine-country tour of Europe. James joined the Kings once the NBA lockout ended in 1999. Playing 16 games for the Kings as a reserve, James averaged 1.5 points and 1.1 rebounds. James sat out the entire 1999–2000 season due to a knee injury. The Kings waived James on October 20, 2000.

=== KK Budućnost and ASVEL Villeurbanne (2000–2001) ===
For the 2000–01 season, James played 10 games for KK Budućnost of the YUBA League with 12.1 points and 6.7 rebounds per game and was part of the 2001 league championship team. James later signed with ASVEL Basket of the French LNB Pro A. Competing with ASVEL in the LNB playoffs, James averaged 9.5 points, 6.2 rebounds, and 2 blocks.

=== Seattle SuperSonics (2001–2005) ===
On September 5, 2001, James returned to the NBA and signed with the Seattle SuperSonics. In the 2001–02 season, James played 56 games with 40 starts and averaged 5.3 points, 4.1 rebounds, and 0.4 steals and scored on 49.1% of field goal attempts. James also led the team in blocks with 86.

James has averaged 4.3 points and 3.1 rebounds per game in 358 career games (180 games started). James played well for the Seattle SuperSonics during the 2005 NBA playoffs, averaging 12.5 points, 6.8 rebounds and 1.8 blocks in 11 games against the Kings and San Antonio Spurs.

=== New York Knicks (2005–2009) ===
After the 2004–05 season, James signed a 5-year, $30 million free-agent contract with the Knicks on the strength of an outstanding performance in the 2005 playoffs in which he greatly exceeded his regular-season statistics. He arrived at his first training camp out of shape and in his first season he only averaged 3.1 points and 2.1 rebounds in 9 minutes per game. James missed much of the season due to injury and when he was not injured, he frequently played insignificant minutes. James was suspended on January 2, 2006, for not being prepared to practice.

James is often cited as one of many questionable signings by Knicks general manager Isiah Thomas. He is also sometimes cited as an example of the "contract year phenomenon", where an athlete with impending free agency plays at a higher level than he ever has before, only to return to his normal level of play once he signs a new long-term contract. Chris Mannix of Sports Illustrated wrote "James was a chronic underachiever who cashed in on a brief moment of excellence".

In the 2007–08 NBA season he played in only two games (January 18 and 21) for a total of five minutes, while earning a salary of $5.8 million. James made his only field goal shot and two free throws of the season at Washington. He played another 2 games the following season, scoring 6 points, but suffered a season-ending torn Achilles tendon injury.

On February 19, 2009, James was traded by the Knicks along with Tim Thomas and Anthony Roberson to the Chicago Bulls in exchange for Larry Hughes. James never played any minutes for the Chicago Bulls due to injury. He was waived by the Bulls shortly before the 2010 playoffs.

=== Puerto Rico ===
James returned to professional basketball in 2012, signing with the Caciques de Humacao of the Puerto Rican BSN league on February 28. In 7 games, James made 43% of field goal attempts and averaged 9.1 points and 7.4 rebounds.

James returned to Puerto Rico in 2015, signing with Atenienses de Manatí. He was released by Atenienses on March 18 but stuck around with the club for a further three games pending the arrival of Ekene Ibekwe.

== NBA career statistics ==
Legend
GP	Games played	GS	Games started	MPG	Minutes per game
FG%	Field goal percentage	3P%	3-point field goal percentage	FT%	Free throw percentage
RPG	Rebounds per game	APG	Assists per game	SPG	Steals per game
BPG	Blocks per game	PPG	Points per game	**Bold**	Career high

=== Regular season ===
Year	Team	GP	GS	MPG	FG%	3P%	FT%	RPG	APG	SPG	BPG	PPG
1998–99	Sacramento	16	0	2.6	.375	.000	.500	1.1	.1	.1	.4	1.5
2001–02	Seattle	56	40	**16.9**	.491	.000	.500	4.1	.4	.4	1.5	5.3
2002–03	Seattle	51	16	15.0	.478	.000	.587	**4.2**	**.5**	.2	**1.6**	**5.4**
2003–04	Seattle	65	24	15.2	.498	.000	.660	3.5	**.5**	.3	.9	5.0
2004–05	Seattle	**80**	**80**	16.6	.509	.000	.723	3.0	.2	.3	1.4	4.9
2005–06	New York	45	9	9.0	.463	.000	.625	2.0	.3	.1	.5	3.0
2006–07	New York	41	11	6.7	.418	.000	.556	1.6	.1	.1	.4	1.9
2007–08	New York	2	0	2.5	**1.000**	.000	**1.000**	1.5	.0	.0	.0	2.0
2008–09	New York	2	0	5.0	.375	.000	.000	1.5	.0	**.5**	.5	3.0
Career		358	180	13.3	.485	.000	.617	3.1	.3	.3	1.1	4.3

=== Playoffs ===
Year	Team	GP	GS	MPG	FG%	3P%	FT%	RPG	APG	SPG	BPG	PPG
1999	Sacramento	1	0	4.0	.500	.000	.750	2.0	.0	.0	.0	5.0
2002	Seattle	5	1	14.0	.391	.000	.000	2.4	**.8**	.0	1.0	3.6
2005	Seattle	**11**	**11**	**26.8**	**.514**	.000	**.767**	**6.8**	.5	**.5**	**1.8**	**12.5**
Career		17	12	21.7	.493	.000	.722	5.2	.5	.4	1.5	9.4

== Personal ==
James's son Dallas James played basketball for four seasons at South Carolina State from 2020 to 2024, and transferred to Indiana University for the 2024–25 season.
