= Darius Miles =

American basketball player (born 1981)

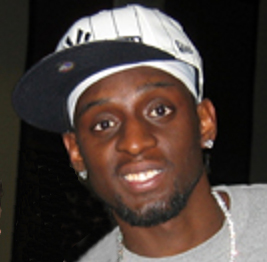
- Miles in 2006

Personal information
- Born: October 9, 1981 (age 45) Belleville, Illinois, U.S.
- Listed height: 6 ft 9 in (2.06 m)
- Listed weight: 235 lb (107 kg)

Career information
- High school: East St. Louis (East St. Louis, Illinois)
- NBA draft: 2000: 1st round, 3rd overall pick
- Drafted by: Los Angeles Clippers
- Playing career: 2000–2009
- Position: Small forward
- Number: 21, 23, 3

Career history
- 2000–2002: Los Angeles Clippers
- 2002–2004: Cleveland Cavaliers
- 2004–2008: Portland Trail Blazers
- 2008–2009: Memphis Grizzlies

Career highlights
- NBA All-Rookie First Team (2001); Mr. Basketball USA (2000); First-team Parade All-American (2000); McDonald's All-American (2000); Illinois Mr. Basketball (2000)

Career statistics
- Points: 4,507 (10.1 ppg)
- Rebounds: 2,190 (4.9 rpg)
- Assists: 840 (1.9 apg)
- Stats at NBA.com
- Stats at Basketball Reference

Darius LaVar Miles (born October 9, 1981) is an American former professional basketball player.

The 6 ft 9 in (2.06 m), 235 lb (107 kg) small forward was selected directly out of high school by the Los Angeles Clippers with the third overall pick in the 2000 NBA draft. He was a First Team NBA All-Rookie in 2001, a first for a prep-to-pro player.

Miles' playing career nearly came to an end when he was released by the Portland Trail Blazers in April 2008 after two years away from the court following microfracture surgery on his right knee. He returned to action during the 2008–09 season as a member of the Memphis Grizzlies.

== Early life ==
Miles was born in Belleville, Illinois and attended East St. Louis Lincoln High School and East St. Louis Senior High School in East St. Louis, Illinois. Before declaring to enter the 2000 NBA draft, Miles had signed a National Letter of Intent to play for the St. John's Red Storm men's basketball team, alongside fellow top recruit Omar Cook. Mike Jarvis, the head coach for the Red Storm at the time, has stated that Miles' commitment significantly helped obtain Cook and the other incoming freshmen from the recruiting class.

== Professional career ==
=== Los Angeles Clippers (2000–2002) ===
Miles entered the 2000 NBA draft and was selected by the Los Angeles Clippers as the third overall pick, at the time the highest a player had been drafted directly from high school. His debut game was played on October 31, 2000, in a 94–107 loss to the Utah Jazz where he recorded eight points, seven rebounds, two assists and two blocks.

For the next two seasons Miles, Quentin Richardson, Corey Maggette, Lamar Odom and Elton Brand entertained fans with their exciting, high flying style of play. He played his first two seasons with the Clippers, earning an NBA All-Rookie Team first team honor in 2001. In those years Miles, Richardson, and others helped the Clippers improve their performance from 15 wins in 99–00, to 31 wins in 00–01 to finally 39 wins in 01–02. In the 2001–02 season, the Clippers appeared to be on the verge of their first playoff appearance since 1997; however, they were only able to win three of the last 12 games of the season, ultimately finishing five games out of the playoffs.

=== Cleveland Cavaliers (2002–2004) ===
Following the 2001–2002 season, Miles was traded to the Cleveland Cavaliers, alongside Harold Jamison, in a deal for Andre Miller and Bryant Stith where he spent a season and a half before being traded to the Portland Trail Blazers for Jeff McInnis and Ruben Boumtje-Boumtje midway through the 2003–04 season.

=== Portland Trail Blazers (2004–2008) ===
Following his strong second half of the season with Portland, Miles would re-sign on a six-year, $48 million contract during the 2004 offseason. During the 2004–05 season, Miles made headlines after a confrontation with then-coach Maurice Cheeks in which Miles reportedly insulted Cheeks with racial slurs and remarked he "did not care if the team were to lose the next 20 games" since Cheeks was "going to be fired anyway". According to ESPN's Chad Ford and other accounts, after Cheeks asked Miles to leave, Miles' response was "Make me." When Cheeks left the room to see Blazers' general manager John Nash, Miles ran behind him shouting, "That's right, run to your daddy." On April 19, 2005, he scored a career-high 47 points in a loss against the Denver Nuggets, which equaled the eighth-highest single-game output in franchise history up to that point.

Late in the 2005–2006 season, Miles severely injured his right knee. Five days later, on April 15, 2006, he played in his 40th and last game of the season. He missed the entire 2006–07 and 2007–08 NBA seasons due to microfracture surgery to repair his injury.

In an effort to shed the $18 million remaining on Miles's contract, the Portland Trail Blazers petitioned the NBA and the NBA Players Association in March 2008 to provide an independent doctor to decide whether Miles could play again. The examination determined that Miles' knee injury was severe enough to be career-ending, prompting the Blazers to request waivers for his release on April 14, 2008. However, Miles had the option to sign on with another team if offered a contract, potentially reverting the $18 million savings the Blazers hoped to gain if Miles played in 10 games in 2008.

Complicating matters was a 10-game suspension for violating the league's substance abuse policy levied by the NBA, which Miles was required to serve before he could play for any NBA team.

=== Memphis Grizzlies (2008–2009) ===
On August 22, 2008, the Celtics signed Miles to a non-guaranteed contract offering him a chance to earn a roster spot at training camp. Though he worked out twice with the team and impressed with his health and attitude, he was waived on October 20, before the regular season started.

On December 13, 2008, Miles signed with the Memphis Grizzlies. After sitting out his ten-game suspension, Miles made his season debut with the team on January 4, 2009, playing the last 1:46 in a 102–82 win against the Dallas Mavericks. On January 7, after collecting only two rebounds and two blocks in nine minutes over two games, Miles was waived. On January 9, following a controversy over his re-signing, the Grizzlies signed Miles to a 10-day contract. The next game, against the Cavaliers on January 14, Miles played 14 minutes and exhibited some of the quickness and leaping ability he once possessed. He recorded 13 points on 4 of 6 shooting and making 5 of 7 free throws in a 102–87 loss. On January 30, 2009, the Grizzlies signed Miles for the rest of the 2008–09 season.

On July 9, 2009, the Grizzlies renounced their rights on Miles in order to save cap room.

==== Career-ending injury controversy ====
Under NBA rules, if a team is granted salary-cap relief for a career-ending injury to a player who thereafter participates in at least ten games the next season, the salary cap relief is terminated, and the amount is added back to the team's salary cap ceiling.

On January 8, 2009, after Miles played six pre-season games with the Celtics and two before being released from a non-guaranteed contract by the Grizzlies, the Portland Trail Blazers threatened to sue any of the other 29 NBA teams that picked up Miles and played him specifically to adversely impact their salary cap and tax positions. In response, the NBA Players Association threatened to file a grievance against the Trail Blazers. After a directive from the NBA Commissioner's office the next day declaring that any team could sign Miles and the League would approve the contract, the Memphis Grizzlies re-signed Miles on January 10, 2009, to a 10-day non-guaranteed contract. Miles then played the two games necessary to trigger re-addition of the $18 million to Portland's cap amount. Miles then re-signed two more 10-day contracts with the Grizzlies before being signed for the rest of the 2008–09 season on January 30, 2009.

Miles' final NBA game was played on April 13, 2009, in a 110–119 loss to the Phoenix Suns in which he recorded two points, two rebounds and an assist in six and one-half minutes of playing time.

== Acting career ==
Miles had a role in The Perfect Score (2004), as a high school basketball star who needs to achieve a qualifying SAT score to attend St. John's University, closely paralleling his real-life situation coming out of high school. He also appeared in National Lampoon's Van Wilder (2002), along with then-Clipper teammates Michael Olowokandi and Quentin Richardson. He also appeared in a documentary titled The Youngest Guns (2004), which detailed Miles' and Richardson's first few years in the NBA.

== NBA career statistics ==
Legend
GP	Games played	GS	Games started	MPG	Minutes per game
FG%	Field goal percentage	3P%	3-point field goal percentage	FT%	Free throw percentage
RPG	Rebounds per game	APG	Assists per game	SPG	Steals per game
BPG	Blocks per game	PPG	Points per game	**Bold**	Career high

=== Regular season ===
Year	Team	GP	GS	MPG	FG%	3P%	FT%	RPG	APG	SPG	BPG	PPG
2000–01	L.A. Clippers	81	21	26.3	.505	.053	.521	**5.9**	1.2	.6	**1.5**	9.4
2001–02	L.A. Clippers	**82**	6	27.2	.481	.158	.620	5.5	2.2	.9	1.3	9.5
2002–03	Cleveland	67	**62**	30.0	.410	.000	.594	5.4	**2.6**	1.0	1.0	9.2
2003–04	Cleveland	37	16	24.0	.432	.167	.542	4.5	2.2	.7	.7	8.9
2003–04	Portland	42	40	28.4	**.526**	.200	.702	4.6	2.0	1.0	.8	12.6
2004–05	Portland	63	22	27.0	.482	**.348**	.600	4.7	2.0	**1.2**	1.2	12.8
2005–06	Portland	40	23	**32.2**	.461	.200	.534	4.6	1.8	1.1	1.0	**14.0**
2008–09	Memphis	34	0	8.8	.485	.167	**.742**	1.7	.5	.3	.6	3.5
Career		446	190	26.3	.472	.168	.590	4.9	1.9	.9	1.1	10.1

== Personal life ==
On August 3, 2011, Miles was arrested in Lambert-St. Louis International Airport for carrying a loaded gun. After making nearly $62 million in his NBA career, Miles filed for bankruptcy on September 18, 2016. In October 2018, Miles addressed mental health issues that he had battled after his career in a Player's Tribune article. Since February 2019 he has co-hosted The Knuckleheads podcast with former Clippers teammate and childhood friend Quentin Richardson associated with The Players' Tribune. On the podcast, Miles and Richardson interview former and current professional basketball players from the perspective of ex-NBA players.

== See also ==
- List of people banned or suspended by the NBA

Awards and achievements
Preceded by Brian Cook	Illinois Mr. Basketball award winner 2000	Succeeded by Eddy Curry
