= Anthony Roberson =

American basketball player (born 1983)

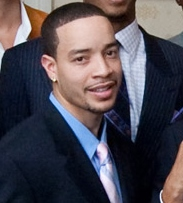
- Roberson visits the White House with the Chicago Bulls in 2009

Personal information
- Born: February 14, 1983 (age 43) Saginaw, Michigan, U.S.
- Listed height: 6 ft 2 in (1.88 m)
- Listed weight: 180 lb (82 kg)

Career information
- High school: Saginaw (Saginaw, Michigan)
- College: Florida (2002–2005)
- NBA draft: 2005: undrafted
- Playing career: 2005–2022
- Position: Point guard
- Number: 3, 5

Career history
- 2005–2006: Memphis Grizzlies
- 2006–2007: Golden State Warriors
- 2007–2008: Hapoel Migdal Jerusalem
- 2008: TTNet Beykoz
- 2008–2009: New York Knicks
- 2009: Chicago Bulls
- 2009–2010: Strasbourg IG
- 2010–2011: Enel Brindisi
- 2011–2012: Fujian Xunxing
- 2012: La Union Formosa
- 2012–2013: Boulazac BD
- 2013–2014: Al Jaysh
- 2014: Ikaros Chalkidas
- 2014–2015: APOEL
- 2016: Paris-Levallois
- 2016–2017: Boulazac Basket Dordogne
- 2018–2020: Libertadores de Querétaro

Career highlights
- SEC Rookie of the Year (2003); McDonald's All-American (2002); First-team Parade All-American (2002); Third-team Parade All-American (2001)
- Stats at NBA.com
- Stats at Basketball Reference

Anthony Roberson (born February 14, 1983) is an American former professional basketball player. Roberson played college basketball for the Florida Gators, and signed with the NBA's Memphis Grizzlies as an undrafted free agent in 2005.

== Early life ==
Roberson was born in Saginaw, Michigan. He attended Saginaw High School, where he played high school basketball for the Saginaw Trojans and was recognized as a Parade magazine high school All-American as a senior. Roberson was recruited by the University of Florida, Duke University, Michigan State University and the University of Michigan, after averaging 24 points per game as a high school junior. He ultimately chose to attend Florida.

== College career ==
Roberson accepted an athletic scholarship to attend the University of Florida in Gainesville, Florida, where he played for coach Billy Donovan's Florida Gators men's basketball team from 2003 to 2005. He chose to forgo his final year of NCAA eligibility and left school after his third college season to enter the NBA Draft.

== Professional career ==
He declared for the 2005 NBA draft after his junior season, and signed with the Memphis Grizzlies in August 2005, after going undrafted. Throughout the 2005–06 NBA season, he split his time between the Grizzlies and the Arkansas RimRockers, the Grizzlies' D-League affiliate.

In October 2006 he was signed by the Golden State Warriors to be evaluated during training camp, and would appear in 20 contests in 2006–07, being waived in early January 2007.

On December 4, 2006, Roberson scored his NBA career high 21 points against the San Antonio Spurs.

After failing to find a job in the NBA in 2007–08, Roberson went overseas and spent the season in Israel (playing for Hapoel Jerusalem) and Turkey.

In July 2008, Roberson was invited to be part of the New York Knicks' summer league team and, on July 16, agreed in principle to a 2-year deal with the team.

On February 19, 2009, Roberson was traded to the Chicago Bulls along with center Jerome James and forward Tim Thomas in exchange for guard Larry Hughes. On July 20, Roberson was waived by the Bulls.

Roberson later played in France with Strasbourg IG. On September 24, 2010, he signed with the Los Angeles Lakers, but he was waived before the start of the season.

On October 8, 2014, Roberson signed a one-year contract with Cypriot side APOEL. He won his first trophy with APOEL just after his first official game, helping his team to win the 2014 Cypriot Super Cup by beating Apollon Limassol 74–58, in a match which Roberson was the top scorer with 19 points.

On July 18, 2016, Boulazac signed with the French team Boulazac Basket Dordogne.

== Personal life ==
His cousin, Terrance Roberson, played college basketball at Fresno State and appeared in three games for the Charlotte Hornets in 2000.

== NBA career statistics ==
Legend
GP	Games played	GS	Games started	MPG	Minutes per game
FG%	Field goal percentage	3P%	3-point field goal percentage	FT%	Free throw percentage
RPG	Rebounds per game	APG	Assists per game	SPG	Steals per game
BPG	Blocks per game	PPG	Points per game	**Bold**	Career high

=== Regular season ===
Year	Team	GP	GS	MPG	FG%	3P%	FT%	RPG	APG	SPG	BPG	PPG
2005–06	Memphis	16	0	5.5	**.452**	**.500**	**1.000**	.4	.3	.1	.0	2.2
2006–07	Golden State	20	**1**	**11.4**	.423	.382	.667	1.1	.5	**.6**	.0	**5.6**
2008–09	New York	**23**	0	11.0	.379	.338	**1.000**	.7	**.8**	.4	.0	4.7
2008–09	Chicago	6	0	3.8	.294	.200	.000	**1.2**	.2	.0	.0	2.0
Career		65	1	9.1	.400	.356	.900	.8	.5	.4	.0	4.1

=== Playoffs ===
Year	Team	GP	GS	MPG	FG%	3P%	FT%	RPG	APG	SPG	BPG	PPG
2009	Chicago	1	0	4.0	.750	1.000	.000	1.0	.0	2.0	.0	8.0
Career		1	0	4.0	.750	1.000	.000	1.0	.0	2.0	.0	8.0

== See also ==
- List of Florida Gators in the NBA
