= Quentin Richardson =

American basketball player (born 1980)

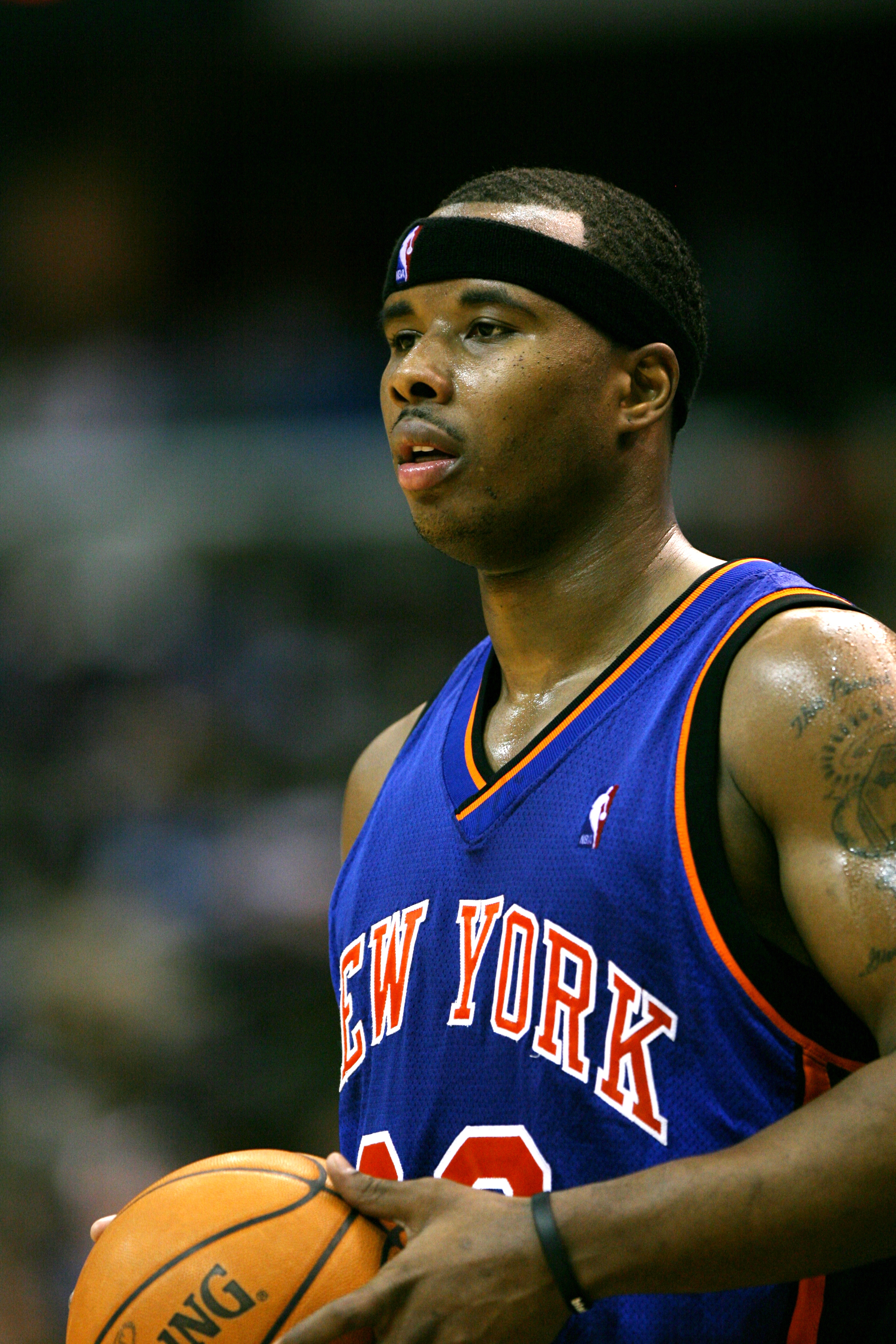
- Richardson with the New York Knicks in 2007

Personal information
- Born: April 13, 1980 (age 46) Chicago, Illinois, U.S.
- Listed height: 6 ft 6 in (1.98 m)
- Listed weight: 228 lb (103 kg)

Career information
- High school: Whitney Young (Chicago, Illinois)
- College: DePaul (1998–2000)
- NBA draft: 2000: 1st round, 18th overall pick
- Drafted by: Los Angeles Clippers
- Playing career: 2000–2013
- Position: Shooting guard / small forward
- Number: 3, 23, 5, 55
- Coaching career: 2014–2016

Career history

Playing
- 2000–2004: Los Angeles Clippers
- 2004–2005: Phoenix Suns
- 2005–2009: New York Knicks
- 2009–2010: Miami Heat
- 2010–2012: Orlando Magic
- 2013: New York Knicks

Coaching
- 2014–2016: Detroit Pistons (director of player development)

Career highlights
- NBA Three-Point Contest champion (2005); USBWA National Freshman of the Year (1999); Conference USA Player of the Year (1999); 2× First-team All-Conference USA (1999, 2000); McDonald's All-American (1998); Second-team Parade All-American (1998)

Career statistics
- Points: 8,032 (10.3 ppg)
- Rebounds: 3,666 (4.7 rpg)
- Assists: 1,138 (1.5 apg)
- Stats at NBA.com
- Stats at Basketball Reference
Medals
Men's basketball
Representing United States
FIBA Americas U18 Championship
Gold medal – first place	1998 Puerto Plata	Team competition1

Quentin Lamar Richardson (born April 13, 1980) is an American former professional basketball player who was formerly the director of player development for the Detroit Pistons of the National Basketball Association (NBA). Nicknamed "Q-Ball", he played professionally for 13 seasons for the Los Angeles Clippers, Phoenix Suns, New York Knicks, Miami Heat, and Orlando Magic. He won the NBA Three-Point Contest in 2005.

== Early years ==
Richardson was born in Chicago, Illinois to Lee and Emma Richardson where he attended Whitney Young High School. In 1998, he led the Dolphins to the state AA title. In 2006, Richardson was voted as one of the 100 Legends of the IHSA Boys Basketball Tournament, a group of former players and coaches in honor of the 100 year anniversary of the IHSA boys basketball tournament.

== Collegiate career ==
Richardson played college basketball for DePaul University where he averaged 17.9 points and 10.2 rebounds per game in two seasons. He became the only player in school history to have 1,000+ points, 500+ rebounds and 100+ three-point field goals. As a freshman, he earned both the Conference USA Player of the Year and Freshman of the Year. Richardson declared for the NBA draft after his sophomore year in 2000.

== Professional career ==
=== Los Angeles Clippers (2000–2004) ===
Richardson was drafted by the Los Angeles Clippers with the 18th pick of the 2000 NBA draft. He was selected after fellow Clippers Darius Miles and Keyon Dooling. Richardson would star in a documentary with Miles entitled The Youngest Guns which chronicled their first three seasons in the NBA with the Clippers.

Richardson's debut game was played on October 31, 2000 in a 94 - 107 loss to the Utah Jazz where he recorded 2 points and 2 rebounds in 7 minutes of playing time. In his first game as a starter on November 29, 2000, Richardson played 43 minutes and recorded 18 points, 8 rebounds, 1 assist and 1 steal in a 103 - 86 victory over the Golden State Warriors.

On New Year's Eve 2003, Richardson posted a career-high 44 points in a 120 - 104 victory over the Denver Nuggets. It was the only time in Richardson's 13-year career where he scored 40 points or more.

Richardson spent four seasons with the Clippers playing in 281 games (starting 105 of them) and averaging 12.0 points, 4.6 rebounds and 1.4 assists at 25.7 minutes per game.

=== Phoenix Suns (2004–2005) ===
Richardson signed a six-year, $45 million contract with the Phoenix Suns as a free agent on July 29, 2004.

The 2004–05 season was a big one for not only Richardson, but the Suns as well. He set a new Suns single-season record for three-point field goals, eclipsing the previous record of 199 set by Dan Majerle. He finished the season with a league-leading 631 three-point attempts, and 226 three-point field goals, co-leading the league with Kyle Korver. Richardson's single-season three-point record was surpassed by Collin Gillespie in the 2025–26 season. Richardson also set a Suns franchise record with nine threes against the New Orleans Hornets on December 29, 2004. Richardson would also go on to win the NBA All-Star Three-Point Shootout that same season. The Suns finished the regular season with a league-best 62 wins and 20 losses. He made his playoff debut with the Suns in 2005 who would eventually lose to the eventual champion San Antonio Spurs in the Western Conference Finals.

On November 20, 2024 on his Knuckleheads Podcast with Darius Miles, Richardson revealed that his sole season in Phoenix was his favorite season of his entire NBA career. Citing that he had the most fun playing with his teammates, the rising stardom of his fellow teammates such as Steve Nash and Amar'e Stoudemire and how the Suns were able to shock the league by making a deep playoff run to the Western Conference Finals.

=== New York Knicks (2005–2009) ===
Richardson was traded from the Suns, along with 2005 draft pick Nate Robinson, to the New York Knicks in exchange for Kurt Thomas and Dijon Thompson on June 28, 2005. His first three seasons in New York were largely hampered by nagging injuries—the most serious being a chronic back condition—which limited him to 55, 49, and 65 games played respectively. His injury situation finally stabilized during the 2008–2009 season, when he remained healthy enough to appear in all but seven games. This does not include two additional DNP-CDs (Did Not Play – Coach's Decision) that he received; one on February 28, 2009, against the Miami Heat and a second on March 10, 2009, against the Milwaukee Bucks.

=== Miami Heat (2009–2010) ===
During the 2009 offseason, Richardson was traded four times within a 49-day timespan. On the 2009 draft day (June 25, 2009), Richardson was first traded to the Memphis Grizzlies in exchange for Darko Miličić. His stint with the Grizzlies was very short as he was traded to the Los Angeles Clippers in exchange for Zach Randolph just 22 days later on July 17, 2009. His second stint with the Clippers only lasted for three days as on July 20, 2009, he was traded to the Minnesota Timberwolves for Sebastian Telfair, Mark Madsen, and Craig Smith.

Finally, after being a member of the Timberwolves for just 24 days, Richardson was traded for the fourth time on August 13, 2009, this time to the Miami Heat for Mark Blount. Richardson would be a consistent starting Small Forward for the Heat, starting in 75 of the 76 games he played while averaging 8.9 points and 4.9 rebounds.

=== Orlando Magic (2010–2012) ===
In 2010, Richardson signed a three-year, $7.5 million contract with the Orlando Magic. He remained with the team until October 2012, when he was waived. During his 2-year stint with Orlando, Richardson played 105 games and averaged 4.4 points, 0.7 assists and 2.9 rebounds while shooting 31.5% from the 3pt-line.

=== Return to New York (2013) ===
On April 16, 2013, Richardson signed with the New York Knicks for the remainder of the season, joining that team for a second time. He only played one regular season game, scoring five points in twenty nine minutes on 1 for 11 shooting, but brought down ten rebounds. He did appear in five playoff games, hitting two three-pointers in New York's 26-point blowout win of the Pacers in Game 2 of the Eastern Conference semifinals.

On July 10, 2013, Richardson was part of a trade package to the Toronto Raptors, along with center Marcus Camby, forward Steve Novak, a first-round draft pick in 2016, and two second-round draft picks in 2014 and 2017, in exchange for forward Andrea Bargnani.

Richardson's final NBA game was played on May 11, 2013, in Game 3 of the Eastern Conference Semi-Finals against the Indiana Pacers. Richardson played less than two minutes and the only stat he recorded was one rebound. On September 3, Richardson was waived by the Raptors.

== Post-playing career ==
On August 7, 2014, it was announced that Richardson was named the director of player development for the Detroit Pistons.

As of 2014 he worked for the Bally Sports Orlando Magic broadcast team.

He hosted over 275 episodes of the Knuckleheads podcast with his former Clippers teammate Darius Miles for The Players' Tribune from 2019 to 2025.

In 2025 he was hired as an NBA analyst for ESPN.

== Accomplishments ==
- NBA three-point scoring leader: (2005)
- IHSA State Championship, Whitney Young (1998)
- McDonald's All American (1998)
- Conference USA Player of the Year (1999)
- Conference USA Freshman of the Year (1999)
- USBWA National Freshman of the Year (1999)
- NBA All-Star Weekend Three-Point Shootout champion (2005)
- 100 Legends of the IHSA Boys Basketball Tournament
- DePaul Athletics Hall of Fame (2016)

== NBA career statistics ==
Legend
GP	Games played	GS	Games started	MPG	Minutes per game
FG%	Field goal percentage	3P%	3-point field goal percentage	FT%	Free throw percentage
RPG	Rebounds per game	APG	Assists per game	SPG	Steals per game
BPG	Blocks per game	PPG	Points per game	**Bold**	Career high

=== Regular season ===
Year	Team	GP	GS	MPG	FG%	3P%	FT%	RPG	APG	SPG	BPG	PPG
2000–01	L.A. Clippers	76	28	17.9	**.442**	.331	.627	3.4	.8	.6	.1	8.1
2001–02	L.A. Clippers	**81**	0	26.6	.432	.381	.765	4.1	1.6	1.0	**.3**	13.3
2002–03	L.A. Clippers	59	13	23.2	.372	.308	.685	4.8	.9	.6	.2	9.4
2003–04	L.A. Clippers	65	64	**36.0**	.398	.352	.740	6.4	2.1	1.0	**.3**	**17.2**
2004–05	Phoenix	79	**78**	35.9	.389	**.358**	.739	6.1	2.0	**1.2**	**.3**	14.9
2005–06	New York	55	43	26.2	.355	.340	.670	4.2	1.6	.7	.1	8.2
2006–07	New York	49	47	33.1	.418	.376	.692	7.2	**2.2**	.7	.1	13.0
2007–08	New York	65	65	28.3	.359	.322	.682	4.8	1.8	.7	.2	8.1
2008–09	New York	72	51	26.3	.393	.365	.761	4.4	1.6	.7	.1	10.2
2009–10	Miami	76	75	27.4	.431	.397	.732	4.9	1.2	.9	.2	8.9
2010–11	Orlando	57	19	16.8	.341	.288	.750	3.1	.7	.4	.1	4.4
2011–12	Orlando	48	3	18.0	.376	.347	.833	2.6	.8	.6	.1	4.5
2012–13	New York	1	0	29.0	.091	.250	**1.000**	**10.0**	1.0	.0	.0	5.0
Career		783	486	26.5	.397	.355	.718	4.7	1.5	.8	.2	10.3

=== Playoffs ===
Year	Team	GP	GS	MPG	FG%	3P%	FT%	RPG	APG	SPG	BPG	PPG
2005	Phoenix	**15**	**15**	**37.6**	.403	.390	.639	**5.1**	1.7	1.3	**.2**	**11.9**
2010	Miami	5	5	29.8	.400	.409	.800	3.8	1.6	**1.6**	**.2**	9.8
2011	Orlando	6	1	16.3	**.533**	**.500**	**1.000**	2.5	.3	.2	**.2**	3.8
2012	Orlando	5	0	14.8	.333	.286	.000	4.4	.4	.2	.0	2.4
2013	New York	5	0	2.8	.333	.400	.000	.6	.0	.0	.0	1.2
Career		36	21	25.0	.404	.397	.674	3.8	1.0	.8	.1	7.5

== Personal life ==
In 1992, Richardson lost his mother to breast cancer, his grandmother to natural causes, and also his brother, Bernard, who was shot and killed in Chicago, aged 23. Another of Richardson's brothers, Lee Jr., was murdered on December 5, 2005, in Chicago during a robbery. Richardson has another older brother, Cedric, and one older sister Rochelle. Richardson is also the cousin of multi entrepreneur Dean Richardson.

Richardson was engaged for 14 months to R&B singer Brandy. They split in September 2005.

Richardson has appeared in multiple acting roles, most notably as himself in the 2002 film Van Wilder.

== See also ==
- List of National Basketball Association career 3-point scoring leaders
