= 2005–06 Charlotte Bobcats season =

NBA professional basketball team season

- Head coach: Bernie Bickerstaff
- General manager: Bernie Bickerstaff
- Owner: Robert L. Johnson
- Arena: Charlotte Bobcats Arena

Results
- Record: 26–56 (.317)
- Place: Division: 4th (Southeast); Conference: 13th (Eastern)
- Playoff finish: Did not qualify
- Stats at Basketball Reference

Local media
- Television: WJZY/WMYT-TV; News 14 Carolina
- Radio: WOLS

The 2005–06 Charlotte Bobcats season was Charlotte's 16th season in the National Basketball Association (NBA), and their second as the Bobcats. The Bobcats moved from the Charlotte Coliseum to the Charlotte Bobcats Arena. During their second season under the Bobcats name, they would become the fourth team to start out their season with three different overtime games within their first six games to start out the regular season.

== Draft picks ==
Round	Pick	Player	Position	Nationality	College
1	5	Raymond Felton	United States	PG	North Carolina
1	13	Sean May	United States	PF	North Carolina

== Roster ==
2005–06 Charlotte Bobcats roster
Players

Pos.	No.	Player	Height	Weight	DOB	From
G/F	15	Alan Anderson	6 ft 6 in (1.98 m)	220 lb (100 kg)	1982-10-16	Michigan State
PF	35	Lonny Baxter	6 ft 8 in (2.03 m)	264 lb (120 kg)	1979-01-27	Maryland
C	7	Primož Brezec	7 ft 1 in (2.16 m)	255 lb (116 kg)	1979-10-02	Slovenia
SG	12	Kevin Burleson	6 ft 3 in (1.91 m)	205 lb (93 kg)	1979-09-04	Minnesota
SG	13	Matt Carroll	6 ft 6 in (1.98 m)	212 lb (96 kg)	1980-08-28	Notre Dame
C	2	Melvin Ely	6 ft 10 in (2.08 m)	261 lb (118 kg)	1978-05-02	Fresno State
SG	20	Raymond Felton	6 ft 1 in (1.85 m)	205 lb (93 kg)	1984-06-26	North Carolina
PF	33	Jumaine Jones	6 ft 8 in (2.03 m)	230 lb (104 kg)	1979-02-10	Georgia
PG	22	Brevin Knight	5 ft 10 in (1.78 m)	170 lb (77 kg)	1975-11-08	Stanford
PF	42	Sean May	6 ft 9 in (2.06 m)	266 lb (121 kg)	1984-04-04	North Carolina
PF	50	Emeka Okafor	6 ft 10 in (2.08 m)	255 lb (116 kg)	1982-09-28	Connecticut
SF	21	Bernard Robinson	6 ft 6 in (1.98 m)	210 lb (95 kg)	1980-12-26	Michigan
SG	4	Kareem Rush	6 ft 6 in (1.98 m)	215 lb (98 kg)	1980-10-30	Missouri
C	43	Jake Voskuhl	6 ft 11 in (2.11 m)	255 lb (116 kg)	1977-11-01	Connecticut
SF	3	Gerald Wallace	6 ft 7 in (2.01 m)	220 lb (100 kg)	1982-07-23	Alabama

Coaches
Head coach
- Bernie Bickerstaff
Assistant(s)
- J. B. Bickerstaff
- Gary Brokaw
- Jeff Capel II
- Gary Kloppenburg
- John Outlaw

Legend
- (DP) Unsigned draft pick
- (FA) Free agent
- (S) Suspended
- Injured

Roster
Updated: April 4, 2006

== Regular season ==
=== Season standings ===
Southeast Division	W	L	PCT	GB	Home	Road	Div
y-Miami Heat	52	30	.634	-	31–10	21–20	13–3
x-Washington Wizards	42	40	.512	10	27–14	15–26	8–8
Orlando Magic	36	46	.439	16	26–15	10–31	9–7
Charlotte Bobcats	26	56	.317	26	17–24	9–32	5–11
Atlanta Hawks	26	56	.317	26	18–23	8–33	5–11

Eastern Conference
#	Team	W	L	PCT	GB
1	z-Detroit Pistons	64	18	.780	-
2	y-Miami Heat	52	30	.634	12
3	y-New Jersey Nets	49	33	.598	15
4	x-Cleveland Cavaliers	50	32	.610	14
5	x-Washington Wizards	42	40	.512	22
6	x-Indiana Pacers	41	41	.500	23
7	x-Chicago Bulls	41	41	.500	23
8	x-Milwaukee Bucks	40	42	.488	24
9	Philadelphia 76ers	38	44	.463	26
10	Orlando Magic	36	46	.439	28
11	Boston Celtics	33	49	.402	31
12	Toronto Raptors	27	55	.329	37
13	Charlotte Bobcats	26	56	.317	38
14	Atlanta Hawks	26	56	.317	38
15	New York Knicks	23	59	.280	41

=== Game log ===
Game	Date	Opponent	Result	Bobcats points	Opponents	Record	Streak	OT
1	November 2	@ Chicago	Loss	105	109	0-1	Lost 1	OT
2	November 4	@ Philadelphia	Win	110	93	1-1	Won 1	
3	November 5	Boston	Win	107	105	2-1	Won 2	OT
4	November 7	Utah	Loss	91	95	2-2	Lost 1	OT
5	November 9	San Antonio	Loss	86	94	2-3	Lost 2	
6	November 11	Dallas	Loss	88	98	2-4	Lost 3	
7	November 12	@ Miami	Loss	99	108	2-5	Lost 4	
8	November 15	@ Orlando	Loss	77	85	2-6	Lost 5	
9	November 16	Indiana	Win	122	90	3-6	Won 1	
10	November 18	@ Indiana	Loss	85	93	3-7	Lost 1	
11	November 19	@ Minnesota	Loss	89	102	3-8	Lost 2	
12	November 23	New York	Win	108	95	4-8	Won 1	
13	November 25	@ Boston	Loss	89	90	4-9	Lost 1	
14	November 26	Washington	Win	100	82	5-9	Won 1	
15	November 29	@ Sacramento	Loss	92	110	5-10	Lost 1	
16	November 30	@ Seattle	Loss	94	104	5-11	Lost 2	
17	December 2	@ Golden State	Loss	100	107	5-12	Lost 3	
18	December 4	@ LA Lakers	Loss	98	99	5-13	Lost 4	
19	December 7	New Jersey	Loss	84	97	5-14	Lost 5	
20	December 9	@ Philadelphia	Loss	115	119	5-15	Lost 6	
21	December 10	Toronto	Loss	103	111	5-16	Lost 7	
22	December 13	Denver	Loss	85	101	5-17	Lost 8	
23	December 14	@ New Jersey	Win	91	83	6-17	Won 1	
24	December 17	Detroit	Loss	78	103	6-18	Lost 1	
25	December 19	Sacramento	Win	106	103	7-18	Won 1	OT
26	December 20	@ Chicago	Win	105	92	8-18	Won 2	
27	December 23	LA Clippers	Loss	88	97	8-19	Lost 1	
28	December 27	@ Atlanta	Win	93	90	9-19	Won 1	
29	December 28	Chicago	Win	93	80	10-19	Won 2	
30	December 30	Phoenix	Loss	100	110	10-20	Lost 1	
31	January 2	@ NO-Oklahoma City	Loss	86	103	10-21	Lost 2	
32	January 4	@ Boston	Loss	106	109	10-22	Lost 3	
33	January 7	@ Orlando	Loss	92	108	10-23	Lost 4	
34	January 10	Houston	Win	111	106	11-23	Won 1	2OT
35	January 11	@ Toronto	Loss	86	95	11-24	Lost 1	
36	January 13	Milwaukee	Loss	102	103	11-25	Lost 2	
37	January 14	@ Detroit	Loss	91	114	11-26	Lost 3	
38	January 16	NO-Oklahoma City	Loss	92	107	11-27	Lost 4	
39	January 18	@ Indiana	Loss	92	98	11-28	Lost 5	
40	January 20	Orlando	Loss	93	104	11-29	Lost 6	
41	January 21	@ Milwaukee	Loss	91	101	11-30	Lost 7	
42	January 24	@ San Antonio	Loss	76	104	11-31	Lost 8	
43	January 25	@ Houston	Loss	78	102	11-32	Lost 9	
44	January 27	Miami	Loss	85	91	11-33	Lost 10	
45	January 28	@ Washington	Loss	97	107	11-34	Lost 11	
46	January 30	Cleveland	Loss	91	103	11-35	Lost 12	
47	February 1	Atlanta	Loss	92	102	11-36	Lost 13	
48	February 3	LA Lakers	Win	112	102	12-36	Won 1	
49	February 6	Seattle	Win	119	106	13-36	Won 2	
50	February 8	Philadelphia	Win	100	92	14-36	Won 3	
51	February 10	Toronto	Loss	73	88	14-37	Lost 1	
52	February 11	@ Milwaukee	Loss	93	99	14-38	Lost 2	
53	February 13	Portland	Loss	83	91	14-39	Lost 3	
54	February 15	New Jersey	Loss	94	95	14-40	Lost 4	
55	February 21	@ Denver	Loss	84	100	14-41	Lost 5	
56	February 22	@ Portland	Win	110	106	15-41	Won 1	
57	February 25	@ Phoenix	Loss	121	136	15-42	Lost 1	
58	February 27	@ LA Clippers	Loss	87	95	15-43	Lost 2	
59	March 1	@ Utah	Win	104	89	16-43	Won 1	
60	March 3	@ Dallas	Loss	76	90	16-44	Lost 1	
61	March 6	Miami	Loss	105	106	16-45	Lost 2	OT
62	March 8	Golden State	Win	104	101	17-45	Won 1	
63	March 11	New York	Win	116	109	18-45	Won 2	
64	March 12	@ Detroit	Loss	78	94	18-46	Lost 1	
65	March 14	Washington	Loss	114	119	18-47	Lost 2	
66	March 15	@ Washington	Loss	99	107	18-48	Lost 3	
67	March 18	Detroit	Loss	103	108	18-49	Lost 4	
68	March 21	Orlando	Win	108	102	19-49	Won 1	
69	March 22	@ Cleveland	Loss	118	120	19-50	Lost 1	OT
70	March 24	@ Miami	Loss	93	114	19-51	Lost 2	
71	March 26	@ Memphis	Loss	95	102	19-52	Lost 3	
72	March 28	Atlanta	Win	125	117	20-52	Won 1	
73	March 31	Chicago	Loss	107	113	20-53	Lost 1	
74	April 2	Cleveland	Loss	97	101	20-54	Lost 2	
75	April 4	Minnesota	Win	97	92	21-54	Won 1	
76	April 6	@ New Jersey	Loss	102	113	21-55	Lost 1	
77	April 9	@ Toronto	Win	94	88	22-55	Won 1	
78	April 12	Memphis	Loss	88	96	22-56	Lost 1	
79	April 14	@ Atlanta	Win	116	110	23-56	Won 1	
80	April 15	Indiana	Win	92	91	24-56	Won 2	OT
81	April 17	@ New York	Win	98	91	25-56	Won 3	
82	April 19	Philadelphia	Win	96	86	26-56	Won 4	

== Player statistics ==
=== Ragular season ===
Player	POS	GP	GS	MP	REB	AST	STL	BLK	PTS	MPG	RPG	APG	SPG	BPG	PPG
Raymond Felton	PG	80	54	2,406	265	446	102	8	948	30.1	3.3	5.6	1.3	.1	11.9
Primož Brezec	C	79	79	2,165	440	45	19	32	982	27.4	5.6	.6	.2	.4	12.4
Matt Carroll	SG	78	6	1,275	157	35	47	11	594	16.3	2.0	.4	.6	.1	7.6
Jumaine Jones	PF	76	42	2,089	376	63	68	22	799	27.5	4.9	.8	.9	.3	10.5
Brevin Knight	PG	69	67	2,351	223	610	157	4	871	34.1	3.2	8.8	2.3	.1	12.6
Bernard Robinson	SF	66	18	1,303	219	77	81	10	422	19.7	3.3	1.2	1.2	.2	6.4
Melvin Ely	PF	57	22	1,348	277	76	29	44	560	23.6	4.9	1.3	.5	.8	9.8
Gerald Wallace	SF	55	52	1,895	412	96	138	115	836	34.5	7.5	1.7	2.5	2.1	15.2
Jake Voskuhl	C	51	2	818	183	39	26	23	270	16.0	3.6	.8	.5	.5	5.3
Kareem Rush	SG	47	25	1,111	103	50	38	13	474	23.6	2.2	1.1	.8	.3	10.1
Keith Bogans^{†}	SG	39	9	848	106	45	39	3	341	21.7	2.7	1.2	1.0	.1	8.7
Kevin Burleson	PG	39	1	340	26	48	26	2	70	8.7	.7	1.2	.7	.1	1.8
Alan Anderson	SF	36	7	564	70	32	11	4	207	15.7	1.9	.9	.3	.1	5.8
Emeka Okafor	PF	26	25	874	261	31	22	50	344	33.6	10.0	1.2	.8	1.9	13.2
Sean May	PF	23	1	398	109	22	17	12	189	17.3	4.7	1.0	.7	.5	8.2
Lonny Baxter^{†}	PF	18	0	119	33	2	2	1	36	6.6	1.8	.1	.1	.1	2.0

- ^{†} Denotes player spent time with another team in the season. Stats reflect time with the Bobcats only.

== Awards and records ==
NBA All-Rookie Second Team

- Raymond Felton
