= 2005–06 New York Knicks season =

Season of National Basketball Association team the New York Knicks

- Head coach: Larry Brown
- General manager: Isiah Thomas
- Owners: Cablevision
- Arena: Madison Square Garden

Results
- Record: 23–59 (.280)
- Place: Division: 5th (Atlantic); Conference: 15th (Eastern)
- Playoff finish: Did not qualify

Local media
- Television: MSG Network
- Radio: WEPN

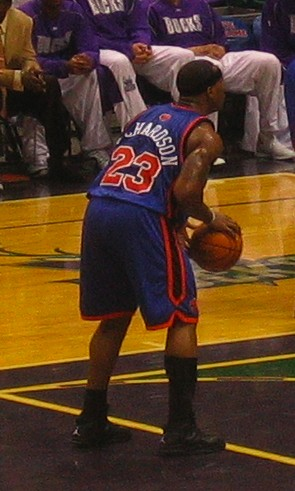
Quentin Richardson of the New York Knicks shooting a free throw in Miwaukee, March 4, 2006.

The 2005–06 New York Knicks season was the 60th season for the team in the National Basketball Association (NBA). The Knicks had the eighth pick in the 2005 NBA draft, and selected Channing Frye from the University of Arizona. During the off-season, the Knicks hired head coach Larry Brown, acquired Eddy Curry and Antonio Davis from the Chicago Bulls, and acquired Quentin Richardson and rookie guard Nate Robinson from the Phoenix Suns. At mid-season, they traded Penny Hardaway and second-year forward Trevor Ariza to the Orlando Magic in exchange for All-Star guard Steve Francis, and dealt Davis back to his former team, the Toronto Raptors, in exchange for Jalen Rose.

The Knicks finished with a 23–59 record, which left them in last place in the Atlantic Division. They had the fewest wins in the Eastern Conference in the 2005–06 season, and only the Portland Trail Blazers had fewer wins in the NBA with a 21–61 record. The Knicks' payroll for the 2005–2006 season was $124 million, putting them $74.5 million above the salary cap, and $62.3 million above the luxury tax line.

Stephon Marbury led the team with 16.3 points and 6.4 assists per game, while Jamal Crawford finished second on the team in scoring with 14.3 points per game, and Curry provided them with 13.6 points and 6.0 rebounds per game. Frye averaged 12.3 points per game, and was named to the NBA All-Rookie First Team, and Robinson won the Slam Dunk Contest during the All-Star Weekend in Houston. Following the season, Brown was fired after spending only one season with the team. Isiah Thomas, the Knicks' general manager, was named head coach for the 2006–07 season.

This was the Knicks' first season since 1995–96 without Allan Houston on the roster as he retired from the NBA on October 17, 2005.

== NBA draft ==
Round	Pick	Player	Position	Nationality	School/Club team
1	8	Channing Frye	C	United States	Arizona
1	30	David Lee	F	United States	Florida
2	54	Dijon Thompson	G/F	United States	UCLA

== Roster ==
New York Knicks roster
Players

Pos.	No.	Player	Height	Weight	DOB	From
C	45	Jackie Butler	6 ft 10 in (2.08 m)	260 lb (118 kg)		Coastal Christian Academy (HS)
SG	11	Jamal Crawford	6 ft 5 in (1.96 m)	200 lb (91 kg)		Michigan
C	34	Eddy Curry	7 ft 0 in (2.13 m)	295 lb (134 kg)		Thornwood (HS)
PG	1	Steve Francis	6 ft 3 in (1.91 m)	210 lb (95 kg)		Maryland
PF	7	Channing Frye	7 ft 0 in (2.13 m)	245 lb (111 kg)		Arizona
C	31	Jerome James	7 ft 1 in (2.16 m)	285 lb (129 kg)		Florida A&M
PF	42	David Lee	6 ft 9 in (2.06 m)	245 lb (111 kg)		Florida
PG	3	Stephon Marbury	6 ft 2 in (1.88 m)	205 lb (93 kg)		Georgia Tech
SF	23	Quentin Richardson	6 ft 6 in (1.98 m)	228 lb (103 kg)		DePaul
PG	4	Nate Robinson	5 ft 9 in (1.75 m)	180 lb (82 kg)		Washington
SG	5	Jalen Rose	6 ft 8 in (2.03 m)	210 lb (95 kg)		Michigan
PF	13	Malik Rose	6 ft 7 in (2.01 m)	250 lb (113 kg)		Drexel
PF	2	Maurice Taylor	6 ft 9 in (2.06 m)	265 lb (120 kg)		Michigan
SF	8	Ime Udoka	6 ft 6 in (1.98 m)	215 lb (98 kg)		Portland State
SF	6	Qyntel Woods	6 ft 8 in (2.03 m)	220 lb (100 kg)		Northeast Mississippi CC

Coaches
Head coach
- Larry Brown
Assistant(s)
- Mark Aguirre
- Brendan Suhr
- Brendan O'Connor
- Dick Helm
- Dave Hanners
- George Glymph
- Phil Ford
- Greg Brittenham
- Herb Williams

Legend
- (DP) Unsigned draft pick
- (FA) Free agent
- (S) Suspended
- Injured

Roster

== Regular season ==
Atlantic Division	W	L	PCT	GB	Home	Road	Div
y-New Jersey Nets	49	33	.598	-	29–12	20–21	10–6
Philadelphia 76ers	38	44	.463	11	23–18	15–26	10–6
Boston Celtics	33	49	.402	16	21–20	12–29	10–6
Toronto Raptors	27	55	.329	22	15–26	12–29	6–10
New York Knicks	23	59	.280	26	15–26	8–33	4–12

Eastern Conference
#	Team	W	L	PCT	GB
1	z-Detroit Pistons	64	18	.780	-
2	y-Miami Heat	52	30	.634	12
3	y-New Jersey Nets	49	33	.598	15
4	x-Cleveland Cavaliers	50	32	.610	14
5	x-Washington Wizards	42	40	.512	22
6	x-Indiana Pacers	41	41	.500	23
7	x-Chicago Bulls	41	41	.500	23
8	x-Milwaukee Bucks	40	42	.488	24
9	Philadelphia 76ers	38	44	.463	26
10	Orlando Magic	36	46	.439	28
11	Boston Celtics	33	49	.402	31
12	Toronto Raptors	27	55	.329	37
13	Charlotte Bobcats	26	56	.317	38
14	Atlanta Hawks	26	56	.317	38
15	New York Knicks	23	59	.280	41

== Player statistics ==
Legend
GP	Games played	GS	Games started	MPG	Minutes per game
FG%	Field-goal percentage	3P%	3-point field-goal percentage	FT%	Free-throw percentage
RPG	Rebounds per game	APG	Assists per game	SPG	Steals per game
BPG	Blocks per game	PPG	Points per game

=== Regular season ===
Player	GP	GS	MPG	FG%	3P%	FT%	RPG	APG	SPG	BPG	PPG
Jamal Crawford	79	27	32.3	.416	.345	.826	3.1	3.8	1.1	.2	14.3
Eddy Curry	72	69	25.9	.563		.632	6.0	.3	.4	.8	13.6
Malik Rose	72	35	15.5	.374	1.000	.781	3.6	.9	.6	.2	4.4
Nate Robinson	72	26	21.4	.407	.397	.752	2.3	2.0	.8	.0	9.3
David Lee	67	14	16.9	.596		.577	4.5	.6	.4	.3	5.1
Maurice Taylor	67	13	18.1	.468	.000	.699	3.4	.8	.3	.2	6.3
Channing Frye	65	14	24.2	.477	.333	.825	5.8	.8	.5	.7	12.3
Stephon Marbury	60	60	36.6	.451	.317	.755	2.9	6.4	1.1	.1	16.3
Quentin Richardson	55	43	26.2	.355	.340	.670	4.2	1.6	.7	.1	8.2
Jackie Butler	55	0	13.5	.544		.753	3.3	.5	.3	.6	5.3
Qyntel Woods	49	16	20.7	.508	.367	.645	3.9	1.0	.7	.3	6.7
Jerome James	45	9	9.0	.463		.625	2.0	.3	.1	.5	3.0
Antonio Davis^{†}	36	31	20.8	.428	.000	.738	4.8	.4	.6	.3	5.0
Trevor Ariza^{†}	36	10	19.7	.418	.333	.545	3.8	1.3	1.2	.3	4.6
Jalen Rose^{†}	26	23	28.7	.460	.491	.812	3.2	2.6	.4	.1	12.7
Steve Francis^{†}	24	15	27.5	.442	.538	.761	3.0	3.5	1.0	.3	10.8
Ime Udoka	8	0	14.3	.375	.333	.500	2.1	.8	.1	.0	2.8
Matt Barnes^{†}	6	5	15.5	.367	.250	.750	4.0	1.0	.7	.0	4.3
Penny Hardaway	4	0	18.0	.286	.000	1.000	2.5	2.0	.5	.0	2.5

- ^{†} Denotes player spent time with another team in the season. Stats reflect time with the Knicks only.

== See also ==
- 2005–06 NBA season
