= 2005–06 Milwaukee Bucks season =

NBA professional basketball team season

- Head coach: Terry Stotts
- Owners: Herb Kohl
- Arena: Bradley Center

Results
- Record: 40–42 (.488)
- Place: Division: 5th (Central); Conference: 8th (Eastern)
- Playoff finish: First Round (lost to Pistons 1–4)

Local media
- Television: WCGV-TV; FSN North
- Radio: WTMJ

The 2005-06 Milwaukee Bucks season was the team's 38th in the NBA. They began the season hoping to improve upon their 30-52 output from the previous season. They bested it by ten games, finishing 40–42, qualifying for the playoffs despite finishing last place in the Central Division.

== Draft picks ==
Round	Pick	Player	Position	Nationality	College
1	1	Andrew Bogut	C	Australia	Utah
2	36	Ersan İlyasova	F	Turkey	

== Roster ==
2005–06 Milwaukee Bucks roster
Players

Pos.	No.	Player	Height	Weight	DOB	From
PG	42	Charlie Bell	6 ft 3 in (1.91 m)	200 lb (91 kg)	1979–03–12	Michigan State
C	6	Andrew Bogut	7 ft 0 in (2.13 m)	260 lb (118 kg)	1984–11–28	Utah
PG	11	T. J. Ford	6 ft 0 in (1.83 m)	165 lb (75 kg)	1983–03–24	Texas
C	50	Dan Gadzuric	6 ft 11 in (2.11 m)	245 lb (111 kg)	1978–02–02	UCLA
PG	34	Reece Gaines	6 ft 6 in (1.98 m)	205 lb (93 kg)	1981–01–07	Louisville
F	23	Ersan İlyasova	6 ft 10 in (2.08 m)	235 lb (107 kg)	1987–05–15	Turkey
G	5	Jermaine Jackson	6 ft 4 in (1.93 m)	204 lb (93 kg)	1976–06–07	Detroit Mercy
C	40	Ervin Johnson	6 ft 11 in (2.11 m)	245 lb (111 kg)	1967–12–21	New Orleans
F	7	Toni Kukoč	6 ft 10 in (2.08 m)	192 lb (87 kg)	1968–09–18	Croatia
C	20	Jamaal Magloire	6 ft 11 in (2.11 m)	265 lb (120 kg)	1978–05–21	Kentucky
SG	22	Michael Redd	6 ft 6 in (1.98 m)	215 lb (98 kg)	1979–08–24	Ohio State
G/F	21	Bobby Simmons	6 ft 6 in (1.98 m)	230 lb (104 kg)	1980–06–02	DePaul
PF	8	Joe Smith	6 ft 10 in (2.08 m)	225 lb (102 kg)	1975–07–26	Maryland
G/F	44	Jiří Welsch	6 ft 7 in (2.01 m)	210 lb (95 kg)	1980–01–27	Czech Republic
PG	25	Mo Williams	6 ft 1 in (1.85 m)	198 lb (90 kg)	1982–12–19	Alabama

Coaches
Head coach
- Terry Stotts
Assistant(s)
- Lester Conner
- Brian James
- Bob Ociepka
- Mike Sanders

Legend
- (DP) Unsigned draft pick
- (FA) Free agent
- (S) Suspended
- Injured

Roster

== Regular season ==
=== Season standings ===
Central Division	W	L	PCT	GB	Home	Road	Div
y-Detroit Pistons	64	18	.780	-	37–4	27–14	13–3
x-Cleveland Cavaliers	50	32	.610	14	31–10	19–22	11–5
x-Indiana Pacers	41	41	.500	23	27–14	14–27	6–10
x-Chicago Bulls	41	41	.500	23	21–20	20–21	4–12
x-Milwaukee Bucks	40	42	.488	24	25–16	15–26	6–10

Eastern Conference
#	Team	W	L	PCT	GB
1	z-Detroit Pistons	64	18	.780	-
2	y-Miami Heat	52	30	.634	12
3	y-New Jersey Nets	49	33	.598	15
4	x-Cleveland Cavaliers	50	32	.610	14
5	x-Washington Wizards	42	40	.512	22
6	x-Indiana Pacers	41	41	.500	23
7	x-Chicago Bulls	41	41	.500	23
8	x-Milwaukee Bucks	40	42	.488	24
9	Philadelphia 76ers	38	44	.463	26
10	Orlando Magic	36	46	.439	28
11	Boston Celtics	33	49	.402	31
12	Toronto Raptors	27	55	.329	37
13	Charlotte Bobcats	26	56	.317	38
14	Atlanta Hawks	26	56	.317	38
15	New York Knicks	23	59	.280	41

z - clinched division title
y - clinched division title
x - clinched playoff spot

=== Game log ===
2005–06 game log
Total: 40–42 (home: 4–1; road: 0–0)
November: 6–3 (home: 4–1; road: 2–2)

Game	Date	Team	Score	High points	High rebounds	High assists	Location Attendance	Record
1	November 1, 2005	@ Philadelphia	W 117–108	Michael Redd (30)			Wachovia Center; 17,705	1–0
2	November 2, 2005	@ New Jersey	W 110–96	Mo Williams (23)			Continental Airlines Arena; 20,098	2–0
3	November 5, 2005	Miami	W 105–100	Michael Redd, Bobby Simmons (23)			Bradley Center; 18,717	3–0
4	November 8, 2005	Golden State	L 103–110	Michael Redd, Mo Williams (21)			Bradley Center; 14,712	3–1
5	November 12, 2005	Indiana	W 103–102	Michael Redd (28)			Bradley Center; 17,894	4–1
6	November 15, 2005	@ L. A. Clippers	L 85–109	Michael Redd, T. J. Ford (15)			STAPLES Center; 14,938	4–2
7	November 16, 2005	@ Golden State	W 90–87	Michael Redd (27)			Oakland Arena; 16,752	5–2
8	November 18, 2005	@ Sacramento	L 82–103	Joe Smith (21)			ARCO Arena; 17,317	5–3
9	November 21, 2005	@ Utah	L 80–100	Michael Redd (25)			Delta Center; 16,176	5–4
10	November 23, 2005	Philadelphia	W 108–97	Michael Redd (32)			Bradley Center; 17,526	6–4
11	November 25, 2005	@ Minnesota	L 91–99	Michael Redd (28)			Target Center; 17,422	6–5
13	November 29, 2005	Dallas	W 113–111 OT				Bradley Center; 14,996	7–6

December: 2–1 (home: 2–1; road: 0–0)

Game	Date	Team	Score	High points	High rebounds	High assists	Location Attendance	Record
18	December 10, 2005	Cleveland	W 111–106				Bradley Center; 18,717	11–7
22	December 17, 2005	Utah	L 80–88				Bradley Center; 16,827	13–9
23	December 20, 2005	San Antonio	W 109–107				Bradley Center; 16,865	14–9

January: 0–0 (home: 0–0; road: 0–0)

Game	Date	Team	Score	High points	High rebounds	High assists	Location Attendance	Record

February: 0–0 (home: 0–0; road: 0–0)

Game	Date	Team	Score	High points	High rebounds	High assists	Location Attendance	Record

March: 0–0 (home: 0–0; road: 0–0)

Game	Date	Team	Score	High points	High rebounds	High assists	Location Attendance	Record

April: 0–0 (home: 0–0; road: 0–0)

Game	Date	Team	Score	High points	High rebounds	High assists	Location Attendance	Record

2005–06 schedule

== Playoffs ==
2006 playoff game log
First Round: 1–4 (home: 1–1; road: 0–3)

Game	Date	Team	Score	High points	High rebounds	High assists	Location Attendance	Series
1	April 23	@ Detroit	L 74–92	Charlie Bell (13)	Jamaal Magloire (9)	Ford, Bogut (3)	The Palace of Auburn Hills; 22,076	0–1
2	April 26	@ Detroit	L 98–109	Michael Redd (29)	Andrew Bogut (13)	Andrew Bogut (4)	The Palace of Auburn Hills; 22,076	0–2
3	April 29	Detroit	W 124–104	Michael Redd (40)	three players tied (7)	T. J. Ford (15)	Bradley Center; 18,717	1–2
4	May 1	Detroit	L 99–109	Michael Redd (33)	Jamaal Magloire (12)	Andrew Bogut (6)	Bradley Center; 16,296	1–3
5	May 3	@ Detroit	L 93–122	Michael Redd (23)	Michael Redd (9)	T. J. Ford (6)	The Palace of Auburn Hills; 22,076	1–4

2006 schedule

== Player statistics ==
Legend
GP	Games played	GS	Games started	MPG	Minutes per game
FG%	Field-goal percentage	3P%	3-point field-goal percentage	FT%	Free-throw percentage
RPG	Rebounds per game	APG	Assists per game	SPG	Steals per game
BPG	Blocks per game	PPG	Points per game

Player	GP	GS	MPG	FG%	3FG%	FT%	RPG	APG	SPG	BPG	PPG
Charlie Bell	59	6	21.7	.439	.423	.708	2.0	2.2	1.0	0.1	8.4
Andrew Bogut	82	77	28.6	.533	.000	.629	7.0	2.3	0.6	0.8	9.4
Josh Davis	4	0	3.0	.250	.000		0.8	0.3	0.3	0.0	0.5
T. J. Ford	72	70	35.5	.416	.337	.754	4.3	6.6	1.4	0.1	12.2
Dan Gadzuric	74	0	12.0	.553	.000	.461	3.1	0.3	0.3	0.6	5.2
Reece Gaines	12	0	4.5	.500	.000	.250	0.0	0.3	0.1	0.0	1.1
Jermaine Jackson	30	2	6.7	.423	.250	.857	0.9	0.8	0.1	0.0	1.2
Ervin Johnson	18	0	4.5	.412		.500	1.3	0.1	0.1	0.1	0.8
Toni Kukoč	65	0	15.7	.389	.306	.714	2.3	2.1	0.5	0.3	4.9
Jamaal Magloire	82	82	30.1	.467		.535	9.5	0.7	0.4	1.0	9.2
Michael Redd	80	80	39.1	.450	.395	.877	4.3	2.9	1.2	0.1	25.4
Bobby Simmons	75	74	33.8	.453	.420	.825	4.4	2.3	1.1	0.3	13.4
Joe Smith	44	5	20.2	.475	.000	.774	5.2	0.7	0.5	0.3	8.6
Jiri Welsch	58	2	14.9	.387	.286	.747	1.9	1.1	0.6	0.0	4.3
Mo Williams	58	12	26.4	.424	.382	.850	2.5	4.0	0.9	0.1	12.1

=== Playoffs ===
Player	GP	GS	MPG	FG%	3FG%	FT%	RPG	APG	SPG	BPG	PPG
Michael Redd	5	5	37.0	52.4	46.7	89.1	5.4	1.6	0.8	0.0	27.2
T. J. Ford	5	5	32.4	49.0	40.0	91.7	4.0	6.4	0.6	0.0	12.6
Charlie Bell	5	0	21.6	39.5	45.5	100.0	0.6	1.4	0.6	0.4	9.2
Jamaal Magloire	5	5	27.0	47.4	0.0	60.0	8.0	1.0	0.4	1.2	9.0
Andrew Bogut	5	5	34.4	43.5	0.0	37.5	6.2	3.4	0.6	0.0	8.6
Joe Smith	5	0	21.2	48.5	0.0	66.7	5.4	0.6	0.4	0.4	7.6
Toni Kukoč	3	0	17.7	57.1	62.5	50.0	1.7	3.0	0.3	0.0	7.3
Mo Williams	5	0	15.0	50.0	18.2	0.0	0.6	2.0	0.2	0.0	7.2
Bobby Simmons	5	5	31.8	33.3	41.7	0.0	3.6	2.0	1.8	0.2	6.6
Dan Gadzuric	4	0	4.0	88.9	0.0	50.0	1.0	0.0	0.0	0.3	4.3
Jiri Welsch	4	0	3.8	50.0	0.0	75.0	0.8	0.5	0.3	0.0	1.8
Ervin Johnson	3	0	3.7	0.0	0.0	100.0	1.3	0.0	0.3	0.0	0.7
Jermaine Jackson	2	0	2.0	0.0	0.0	0.0	0.0	1.0	0.0	0.0	0.0

== Transactions ==
=== Trades ===
June 28, 2005
To Milwaukee Bucks----
- Jiří Welsch
To Cleveland Cavaliers----
- 2006 2nd round pick (Lior Eliyahu)
October 26, 2005
To Milwaukee Bucks----
- Jamaal Magloire
To New Orleans Hornets----
- Desmond Mason

=== Free agents ===
Player	Signed	Former team
Bobby Simmons	August 8, 2005	Los Angeles Clippers
Charlie Bell	August 18, 2005	Leche Río Breogán
Ervin Johnson	September 29, 2005	Minnesota Timberwolves
Josh Davis	October 2, 2005	Philadelphia 76ers
Jermaine Jackson	December 15, 2005	Chicago Bulls

Subtractions
Player	Date signed	New team
Zaza Pachulia	August 11, 2005	Atlanta Hawks
Calvin Booth	September 7, 2005	Washington Wizards
