= 2005–06 Boston Celtics season =

Season of National Basketball Association team the Boston Celtics

- Head coach: Doc Rivers
- President: Danny Ainge
- General manager: Chris Wallace
- Owners: Boston Basketball Partners
- Arena: TD Banknorth Garden

Results
- Record: 33–49 (.402)
- Place: Division: 3rd (Atlantic); Conference: 11th (Eastern)
- Playoff finish: Did not qualify
- Stats at Basketball Reference

Local media
- Television: FSN New England
- Radio: WRKO

The 2005–06 Boston Celtics season was the 60th season of the Boston Celtics in the National Basketball Association (NBA). This was the 56th and final season of Arnold "Red" Auerbach's official involvement with the team. Auerbach (who continued to hold the title of team president) died shortly before the next season.

== Draft picks ==
Round	Pick	Player	Position	Nationality	College/School
1	18	Gerald Green	SG	United States	Gulf Shores Academy (TX)
2	50	Ryan Gomes	PF	United States	Providence
2	53	Orien Greene	SG	United States	Louisiana

== Roster ==
2005–06 Boston Celtics roster
Players

Pos.	No.	Player	Height	Weight	DOB	From
PG	42	Tony Allen	6 ft 4 in (1.93 m)	213 lb (97 kg)	1982–01–11	Oklahoma State
PG	20	Dan Dickau	6 ft 0 in (1.83 m)	190 lb (86 kg)	1978–09–16	Gonzaga
PF	4	Ryan Gomes	6 ft 7 in (2.01 m)	250 lb (113 kg)	1982–09–01	Providence
SG	5	Gerald Green	6 ft 6 in (1.98 m)	205 lb (93 kg)	1986–01–26	Gulf Shores Academy (TX)
PG	0	Orien Greene	6 ft 4 in (1.93 m)	208 lb (94 kg)	1982–02–04	Louisiana
PF	7	Al Jefferson	6 ft 10 in (2.08 m)	289 lb (131 kg)	1985–01–04	Prentiss HS (MS)
PF	27	Dwayne Jones	6 ft 11 in (2.11 m)	250 lb (113 kg)	1983–06–09	Saint Joseph's
PF	45	Raef LaFrentz	6 ft 11 in (2.11 m)	245 lb (111 kg)	1976–05–29	Kansas
C	41	Michael Olowokandi	7 ft 0 in (2.13 m)	270 lb (122 kg)	1975–04–03	Pacific
C	43	Kendrick Perkins	6 ft 10 in (2.08 m)	280 lb (127 kg)	1984–11–10	Clifton J. Ozen HS (TX)
SF	34	Paul Pierce	6 ft 7 in (2.01 m)	235 lb (107 kg)	1977–10–13	Kansas
PF	44	Brian Scalabrine	6 ft 9 in (2.06 m)	241 lb (109 kg)	1978–03–18	USC
SF	55	Wally Szczerbiak	6 ft 7 in (2.01 m)	244 lb (111 kg)	1977–03–05	Miami (OH)
PG	13	Delonte West	6 ft 4 in (1.93 m)	180 lb (82 kg)	1983–07–26	Saint Joseph's

Coaches
Head coach
- Doc Rivers
Assistant(s)
- Jim Brewer
- Tony Brown
- Armond Hill
- Paul Pressey
- Dave Wohl
- Kevin Eastman

Legend
- (DP) Unsigned draft pick
- (FA) Free agent
- (S) Suspended
- Injured

Roster
Updated: 2006–02–21

== Regular season ==
=== Standings ===
Atlantic Division	W	L	PCT	GB	Home	Road	Div
y-New Jersey Nets	49	33	.598	-	29–12	20–21	10–6
Philadelphia 76ers	38	44	.463	11	23–18	15–26	10–6
Boston Celtics	33	49	.402	16	21–20	12–29	10–6
Toronto Raptors	27	55	.329	22	15–26	12–29	6–10
New York Knicks	23	59	.280	26	15–26	8–33	4–12

Eastern Conference
#	Team	W	L	PCT	GB
1	z-Detroit Pistons	64	18	.780	-
2	y-Miami Heat	52	30	.634	12
3	y-New Jersey Nets	49	33	.598	15
4	x-Cleveland Cavaliers	50	32	.610	14
5	x-Washington Wizards	42	40	.512	22
6	x-Indiana Pacers	41	41	.500	23
7	x-Chicago Bulls	41	41	.500	23
8	x-Milwaukee Bucks	40	42	.488	24
9	Philadelphia 76ers	38	44	.463	26
10	Orlando Magic	36	46	.439	28
11	Boston Celtics	33	49	.402	31
12	Toronto Raptors	27	55	.329	37
13	Charlotte Bobcats	26	56	.317	38
14	Atlanta Hawks	26	56	.317	38
15	New York Knicks	23	59	.280	41

== Player statistics ==
Legend
GP	Games played	GS	Games started	MPG	Minutes per game
FG%	Field-goal percentage	3P%	3-point field-goal percentage	FT%	Free-throw percentage
RPG	Rebounds per game	APG	Assists per game	SPG	Steals per game
BPG	Blocks per game	PPG	Points per game

=== Regular season ===
Boston Celtics statistics
Player	GP	GS	MPG	FG%	3P%	FT%	RPG	APG	SPG	BPG	PPG
Raef LaFrentz	82	63	24.8	.431	.392	.680	5.0	1.4	.4	.9	7.8
Orien Greene	80	5	15.4	.395	.225	.662	1.8	1.6	1.0	.1	3.2
Paul Pierce	79	79	39.0	.471	.354	.772	6.7	4.7	1.4	.4	26.8
Delonte West	71	71	34.1	.487	.385	.851	4.1	4.6	1.2	.6	11.8
Brian Scalabrine	71	1	13.2	.383	.356	.722	1.6	.7	.3	.3	2.9
Kendrick Perkins	68	40	19.6	.515	.000	.615	5.9	1.0	.3	1.5	5.2
Ryan Gomes	61	33	22.6	.487	.333	.752	4.9	1.0	.6	.1	7.6
Al Jefferson	59	7	18.0	.499	.000	.642	5.1	.5	.5	.8	7.9
Tony Allen	51	9	19.2	.471	.324	.746	2.2	1.3	1.0	.4	7.2
Ricky Davis^{†}	42	42	41.6	.464	.320	.787	4.5	5.3	1.2	.2	19.7
Mark Blount^{†}	39	25	27.8	.511		.764	4.2	1.7	.4	.9	12.4
Wally Szczerbiak^{†}	32	31	36.7	.476	.393	.898	3.8	3.2	.6	.1	17.5
Gerald Green	32	3	11.7	.478	.300	.784	1.3	.6	.4	.1	5.2
Justin Reed^{†}	32	0	9.1	.338		.625	.9	.2	.2	.1	2.3
Dan Dickau	19	0	12.3	.370	.500	1.000	.8	2.1	.6	.1	3.3
Marcus Banks^{†}	18	1	14.9	.413	.316	.900	1.1	1.8	.4	.0	5.5
Michael Olowokandi^{†}	16	0	10.4	.444		.625	2.6	.4	.2	.4	2.8
Dwayne Jones	14	0	6.2	.400		.462	2.2	.1	.1	.2	1.0

- ^{†} Denotes player spent time with another team in the season. Stats reflect time with the Celtics only.

== Transactions ==
=== Trades ===
August 2, 2005
To Boston Celtics

Curtis Borchardt, Qyntel Woods, the 39th pick in the 2004 NBA draft (Albert Miralles), two future 2nd round picks, and cash considerations

To Miami Heat

Antoine Walker

September 30, 2005
To Boston Celtics

Dan Dickau

To New Orleans Hornets

2006 2nd round pick

January 26, 2006
To Boston Celtics

Wally Szczerbiak, Michael Olowokandi, and Dwayne Jones

To Minnesota Timberwolves

Ricky Davis, Mark Blount, Marcus Banks, Justin Reed, and two future 2nd round picks

=== Free agents ===
==== Additions ====
Player	Signed	Former team
Brian Scalabrine	August 2	Boston Celtics
Antoine Walker	August 2	New York Knicks
Will Bynum	August 19	Detroit Pistons

==== Subtractions ====
Player	Left	New team
Gary Payton	September 22	Miami Heat
Qyntel Woods	October 4	Toronto Raptors
Will Bynum	October 25	Detroit Pistons
Curtis Borchardt	October 27	Club Baloncesto Granada

== See also ==
- 2005–06 NBA season
