= Awvee Storey =

American basketball player (born 1977)

Connecticut Sun
- Title: Assistant coach
- League: WNBA

Personal information
- Born: April 18, 1977 (age 49) Chicago, Illinois, U.S.
- Listed height: 6 ft 6 in (1.98 m)
- Listed weight: 225 lb (102 kg)

Career information
- High school: Proviso West (Hillside, Illinois)
- College: Illinois (1997–1998); Arizona State (1999–2002)
- NBA draft: 2002: undrafted
- Playing career: 2002–2010
- Position: Shooting guard / small forward
- Number: 26, 35, 20
- Coaching career: 2017–present

Career history

Playing
- 2002–2003: Seoul Samsung Thunders
- 2003–2004: Seoul SK Knights
- 2004: Trotamundos de Carabobo
- 2004: New Jersey Nets
- 2004–2005: Idaho Stampede
- 2005: Wonju TG Xers
- 2005–2006: Washington Wizards
- 2006–2007: Dakota Wizards
- 2007: Phantoms Braunschweig
- 2007–2008: Milwaukee Bucks
- 2008–2009: Liaoning Hunters
- 2009: New Zealand Breakers
- 2010: Barangay Ginebra Kings

Coaching
- 2018: Chicago Sky (assistant)
- 2018–2019: Capital City Go-Go (assistant)
- 2019–present: Connecticut Sun (assistant)
- 2021–2022: Maine Celtics (assistant)
- Stats at NBA.com
- Stats at Basketball Reference

Awvee Storey (born April 18, 1977) is a former American professional basketball player and assistant coach for the Connecticut Sun of the WNBA. He played the shooting guard and small forward positions.

== High school career ==
Born in Chicago, Illinois, Storey formed a relationship with Bennet Wang who ran an inner-city basketball league. Storey's mother relinquished Storey into Bennet Wang's care. Storey attended Proviso West High School in Hillside, Illinois, in 1996–97, he played for New Hampton Prep.

== College career ==
Storey played his freshman season at the University of Illinois before transferring to Arizona State University, sitting out the 1998–99 season.

Storey was one of the top rebounders in the Pac-10, at only 6–6. He made an immediate impact and gave the young squad some veteran leadership despite being only a sophomore. Blessed with excellent athletic ability, Storey was able to defend guards, forwards and, when necessary, a center. He posted 16 double-doubles in his 85-game career. In 2000–01, he earned Pac-10 Honorable Mention honours, after posting career-highs in points (13.1) and rebounds (9.1), the latter a conference best.

Storey earned his bachelor of Interdisciplinary Studies degree with concentrations in communications and sociology at ASU. In the summer of 2001, he worked for Fox Sports Arizona as a production department intern.

== NBA career ==
Awvee played in the NBA from 2004 to 2008. He played with the New Jersey Nets from 2004 to 2005, the Washington Wizards from 2005 to 2006, and the Milwaukee Bucks from 2007 to 2008.

Storey's final NBA game ever was played on April 16, 2008, in a 101–110 loss to the Minnesota Timberwolves where he recorded 7 points, 4 rebounds and 1 assist. Coincidentally, Timberwolves' forward Kirk Snyder also played his final NBA game during this matchup, recording 6 points, 3 rebounds and 2 assists.

On December 21, 2006, as a member of the NBA Development League's Dakota Wizards, Martynas Andriuškevičius sustained a serious head injury when he was punched by teammate Awvee Storey in an altercation during practice in Bismarck, North Dakota. The center suffered a fractured skull, severe concussion, and a two-centimeter hematoma (bruise) on the left side of his brain. Doctors initially thought it would be months before he could speak, but he was able to within a month, and stated his desire to play basketball within a year. Storey was suspended indefinitely. Days later he had his contract terminated and he was dismissed from the league. Andriuškevičius did not wish to pursue charges.

== NBA career statistics ==
Legend
GP	Games played	GS	Games started	MPG	Minutes per game
FG%	Field goal percentage	3P%	3-point field goal percentage	FT%	Free throw percentage
RPG	Rebounds per game	APG	Assists per game	SPG	Steals per game
BPG	Blocks per game	PPG	Points per game	**Bold**	Career high

=== Regular season ===
Year	Team	GP	GS	MPG	FG%	3P%	FT%	RPG	APG	SPG	BPG	PPG
2004–05	New Jersey	9	0	3.6	.300	**.500**	.500	.6	.1	.0	.0	.9
2005–06	Washington	25	**1**	4.6	.390	.429	**.571**	.9	.2	.1	.0	1.7
2007–08	Milwaukee	**26**	0	**10.0**	**.438**	.000	.483	**2.1**	**.6**	**.3**	.0	**3.5**
Career		60	1	6.8	.414	.250	.511	1.4	.4	.2	.0	2.4

== Coaching career ==
In 2010–11, Storey was a video coordinator for the Washington Wizards. He joined the Washington Mystics in 2011. His task at the Mystics included assisting with scouting, workouts, and player development. After a seven-year stint with the team, he joined the Chicago Sky as an assistant coach in 2018. Storey worked as an assistant to head coach Jarell Christian with the Capital City Go-Go of the NBA G League in the 2018–19 season. On May 19, 2019, Storey was appointed as a video coordinator of WNBA's Connecticut Sun. He helped guide the team to the 2019 WNBA Finals and took over the role as the Sun's player development coach on January 3, 2020. In the 2021–22 season, he served as an assistant coach for the Maine Celtics of the NBA G League.
