= 2005–06 Orlando Magic season =

NBA professional basketball team season

- Head coach: Brian Hill
- President: Bob Vander Weide
- General manager: Dave Twardzik; Otis Smith
- Owner: Richard DeVos
- Arena: TD Waterhouse Centre

Results
- Record: 36–46 (.439)
- Place: Division: 3rd (Southeast); Conference: 10th (Eastern)
- Playoff finish: Did not qualify

Local media
- Television: WRBW; Sun Sports
- Radio: WDBO

The 2005–06 Orlando Magic season was the team's 17th in the NBA. They began the season hoping to improve upon their 36–46 output from the previous season. They matched it exactly, finishing 36–46, but failed to qualify for the playoffs for the third straight season. This season preceded six straight playoff appearances for the Magic. In the off-season, the Magic re-hired head coach Brian Hill for his second stint with the team.

Grant Hill, who was voted as an All-Star last year, was hampered by injuries and was only able to play 21 games this season. In February, Steve Francis was suspended for conduct detrimental to the club and the Magic eventually traded him to the New York Knicks.

== Draft picks ==
| Round | Pick | Player | Position | Nationality | College / Club |
|---|---|---|---|---|---|
| 1 | 11 | Fran Vázquez | F/C | Spain | Unicaja Málaga (Spain) |
| 2 | 38 | Travis Diener | G | United States | Marquette (Sr.) |
| 2 | 57 | Marcin Gortat | F/C | Poland | RheinEnergie Köln (Germany) |

== Roster ==
2005–06 Orlando Magic roster
Players

| Pos. | No. | Player | Height | Weight | DOB | From |
|---|---|---|---|---|---|---|
| F | 1 | Trevor Ariza | 6 ft 8 in (2.03 m) | 215 lb (98 kg) | 1985-06-30 | UCLA |
| G | 30 | Carlos Arroyo | 6 ft 2 in (1.88 m) | 200 lb (91 kg) | 1979-07-30 | FIU |
| F | 2 | Stacey Augmon | 6 ft 8 in (2.03 m) | 213 lb (97 kg) | 1968-08-01 | UNLV |
| F/C | 4 | Tony Battie | 6 ft 11 in (2.11 m) | 240 lb (109 kg) | 1976-02-11 | Texas Tech |
| G | 34 | Travis Diener | 6 ft 1 in (1.85 m) | 175 lb (79 kg) | 1982-03-01 | Marquette |
| G | 5 | Keyon Dooling | 6 ft 3 in (1.91 m) | 195 lb (88 kg) | 1980-05-08 | Missouri |
| F | 8 | Pat Garrity | 6 ft 9 in (2.06 m) | 238 lb (108 kg) | 1976-08-23 | Notre Dame |
| F | 33 | Grant Hill (injured) | 6 ft 8 in (2.03 m) | 225 lb (102 kg) | 1972-10-05 | Duke |
| C | 12 | Dwight Howard | 6 ft 11 in (2.11 m) | 240 lb (109 kg) | 1985-12-08 | SW Atlanta Christian Academy HS (GA) |
| C | 41 | Mario Kasun | 7 ft 0 in (2.13 m) | 260 lb (118 kg) | 1980-04-05 | Croatia |
| C | 31 | Darko Miličić | 7 ft 0 in (2.13 m) | 250 lb (113 kg) | 1985-06-20 | Serbia |
| G | 14 | Jameer Nelson | 6 ft 0 in (1.83 m) | 190 lb (86 kg) | 1982-02-09 | Saint Joseph's |
| F | 45 | Bo Outlaw | 6 ft 8 in (2.03 m) | 220 lb (100 kg) | 1971-04-13 | Houston |
| G | 9 | DeShawn Stevenson | 6 ft 5 in (1.96 m) | 218 lb (99 kg) | 1981-04-03 | Washington Union HS (CA) |
| F | 15 | Hedo Türkoğlu | 6 ft 10 in (2.08 m) | 220 lb (100 kg) | 1979-03-19 | Turkey |

Coaches
Head coach
- Brian Hill
Assistant(s)
- Randy Ayers
- Mark Bryant
- Tom Sterner
- Morlon Wiley
- Randy Wittman

Legend
- (DP) Unsigned draft pick
- (FA) Free agent
- (S) Suspended
- Injured

Roster
Updated: February 24, 2006

== Regular season ==
=== Season standings ===
| Southeast Division | W | L | PCT | GB | Home | Road | Div |
|---|---|---|---|---|---|---|---|
| y-Miami Heat | 52 | 30 | .634 | - | 31–10 | 21–20 | 13–3 |
| x-Washington Wizards | 42 | 40 | .512 | 10 | 27–14 | 15–26 | 8–8 |
| Orlando Magic | 36 | 46 | .439 | 16 | 26–15 | 10–31 | 9–7 |
| Charlotte Bobcats | 26 | 56 | .317 | 26 | 17–24 | 9–32 | 5–11 |
| Atlanta Hawks | 26 | 56 | .317 | 26 | 18–23 | 8–33 | 5–11 |

Eastern Conference
| # | Team | W | L | PCT | GB |
|---|---|---|---|---|---|
| 1 | z-Detroit Pistons | 64 | 18 | .780 | - |
| 2 | y-Miami Heat | 52 | 30 | .634 | 12 |
| 3 | y-New Jersey Nets | 49 | 33 | .598 | 15 |
| 4 | x-Cleveland Cavaliers | 50 | 32 | .610 | 14 |
| 5 | x-Washington Wizards | 42 | 40 | .512 | 22 |
| 6 | x-Indiana Pacers | 41 | 41 | .500 | 23 |
| 7 | x-Chicago Bulls | 41 | 41 | .500 | 23 |
| 8 | x-Milwaukee Bucks | 40 | 42 | .488 | 24 |
| 9 | Philadelphia 76ers | 38 | 44 | .463 | 26 |
| 10 | Orlando Magic | 36 | 46 | .439 | 28 |
| 11 | Boston Celtics | 33 | 49 | .402 | 31 |
| 12 | Toronto Raptors | 27 | 55 | .329 | 37 |
| 13 | Charlotte Bobcats | 26 | 56 | .317 | 38 |
| 14 | Atlanta Hawks | 26 | 56 | .317 | 38 |
| 15 | New York Knicks | 23 | 59 | .280 | 41 |

z – clinched division title
y – clinched division title
x – clinched playoff spot

== Player statistics ==
=== Regular season ===
| Player | POS | GP | GS | MP | REB | AST | STL | BLK | PTS | MPG | RPG | APG | SPG | BPG | PPG |
|---|---|---|---|---|---|---|---|---|---|---|---|---|---|---|---|
| DeShawn Stevenson | SG | 82 | 82 | 2,648 | 241 | 160 | 58 | 17 | 900 | 32.3 | 2.9 | 2.0 | .7 | .2 | 11.0 |
| Tony Battie | C | 82 | 82 | 2,215 | 457 | 49 | 46 | 69 | 649 | 27.0 | 5.6 | .6 | .6 | .8 | 7.9 |
| Dwight Howard | PF | 82 | 81 | 3,021 | 1,022 | 125 | 65 | 115 | 1,292 | 36.8 | 12.5 | 1.5 | .8 | 1.4 | 15.8 |
| Hedo Türkoğlu | SF | 78 | 59 | 2,615 | 333 | 216 | 70 | 21 | 1,165 | 33.5 | 4.3 | 2.8 | .9 | .3 | 14.9 |
| Jameer Nelson | PG | 62 | 33 | 1,784 | 180 | 302 | 70 | 9 | 905 | 28.8 | 2.9 | 4.9 | 1.1 | .1 | 14.6 |
| Pat Garrity | PF | 57 | 0 | 938 | 108 | 38 | 12 | 9 | 282 | 16.5 | 1.9 | .7 | .2 | .2 | 4.9 |
| Keyon Dooling | PG | 50 | 7 | 1,137 | 78 | 109 | 49 | 4 | 470 | 22.7 | 1.6 | 2.2 | 1.0 | .1 | 9.4 |
| Steve Francis^{†} | PG | 46 | 45 | 1,734 | 219 | 262 | 51 | 11 | 747 | 37.7 | 4.8 | 5.7 | 1.1 | .2 | 16.2 |
| Stacey Augmon | SF | 36 | 3 | 385 | 53 | 23 | 12 | 6 | 71 | 10.7 | 1.5 | .6 | .3 | .2 | 2.0 |
| Bo Outlaw | PF | 32 | 0 | 355 | 77 | 14 | 10 | 12 | 75 | 11.1 | 2.4 | .4 | .3 | .4 | 2.3 |
| Darko Miličić^{†} | C | 30 | 1 | 627 | 123 | 32 | 11 | 62 | 229 | 20.9 | 4.1 | 1.1 | .4 | 2.1 | 7.6 |
| Mario Kasun | C | 28 | 0 | 213 | 60 | 3 | 2 | 3 | 80 | 7.6 | 2.1 | .1 | .1 | .1 | 2.9 |
| Carlos Arroyo^{†} | SG | 27 | 0 | 594 | 60 | 77 | 19 | 1 | 291 | 22.0 | 2.2 | 2.9 | .7 | .0 | 10.8 |
| Kelvin Cato^{†} | C | 23 | 0 | 299 | 63 | 2 | 6 | 10 | 88 | 13.0 | 2.7 | .1 | .3 | .4 | 3.8 |
| Travis Diener | PG | 23 | 0 | 246 | 21 | 16 | 7 | 0 | 88 | 10.7 | .9 | .7 | .3 | .0 | 3.8 |
| Terence Morris | SF | 22 | 0 | 192 | 38 | 4 | 6 | 5 | 35 | 8.7 | 1.7 | .2 | .3 | .2 | 1.6 |
| Grant Hill | SF | 21 | 17 | 613 | 80 | 48 | 24 | 6 | 318 | 29.2 | 3.8 | 2.3 | 1.1 | .3 | 15.1 |
| Trevor Ariza^{†} | SF | 21 | 0 | 290 | 81 | 15 | 14 | 2 | 99 | 13.8 | 3.9 | .7 | .7 | .1 | 4.7 |

- ^{†} Denotes player spent time with another team in the season. Stats reflect time with the Magic only.

== Awards and records ==
- Dwight Howard led the league in total rebounds

== Transactions ==
=== Free agency ===
==== Additions ====
| Player | Signed | Former team |
|---|---|---|
| Keyon Dooling | | Miami Heat |
| Terence Morris | | Apollon Patras B.C. |
| Bo Outlaw | | Phoenix Suns |
