= Martynas Andriuškevičius =

Lithuanian basketball player (born 1986)

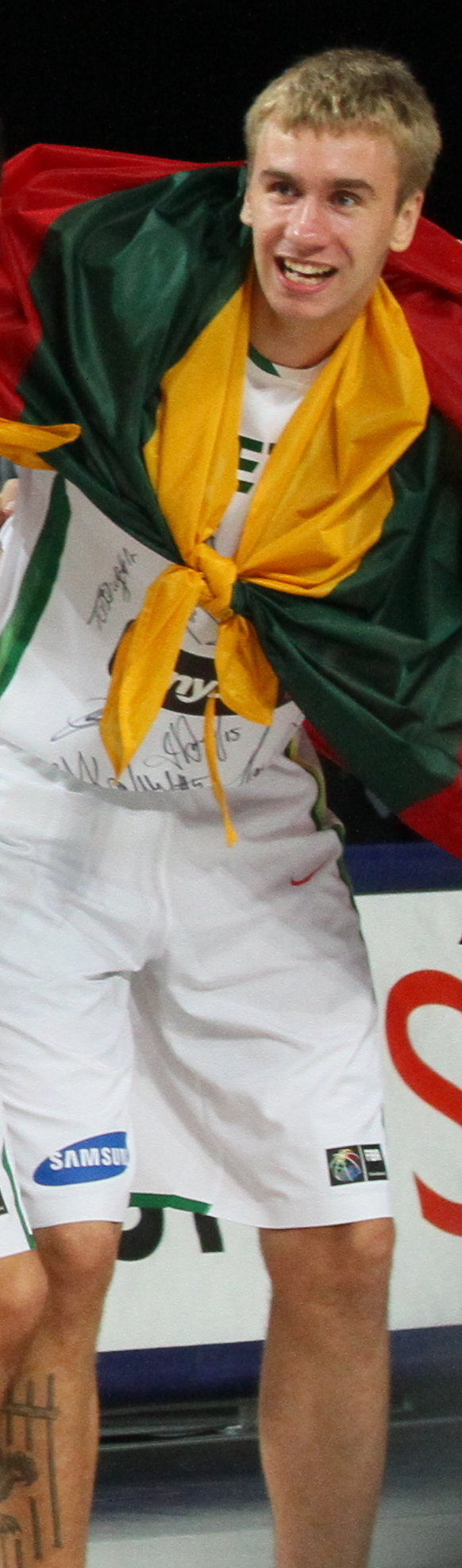

Personal information
- Born: March 12, 1986 (age 40) Kaunas, Lithuania
- Listed height: 7 ft 2 in (2.18 m)
- Listed weight: 250 lb (113 kg)

Career information
- NBA draft: 2005: 2nd round, 44th overall pick
- Drafted by: Orlando Magic
- Playing career: 2002–2020
- Position: Center
- Number: 15

Career history
- 2002–2005: Žalgiris Kaunas
- 2002–2004: →Žalgiris-Arvydas Sabonis school
- 2005–2006: Cleveland Cavaliers
- 2005–2006: →Arkansas RimRockers
- 2006: Dakota Wizards
- 2007–2011: Lucentum Alicante
- 2011–2012: PAOK
- 2012: Neptūnas Klaipėda
- 2013: SKS Starogard Gdański
- 2014–2015: TEMP-SUMZ Revda
- 2016: Helios Suns
- 2017–2018: CB Prat
- 2018–2019: S.C. Lusitânia

Career highlights
- LKL champion (2005); Baltic Basketball League champion (2005); Alpe Adria Cup (2016)
- Stats at NBA.com
- Stats at Basketball Reference
Medals
Men's basketball
Representing Lithuania
FIBA World Cup
Bronze medal – third place	Turkey 2010	National team

Martynas Andriuškevičius (Lithuanian pronunciation: [mɐrʲˈtʲiːnɐs ɐnʲdʲrʲʊʃˈkʲæːvʲɪtɕʊs]; born March 12, 1986) is a Lithuanian former professional basketball player. He is a 2.18 m (7 ft 2 in) tall and 113 kg (250 lb) center. Andriuškevičius has noted perimeter skill for a player of his size, and has trained with former NBA center Arvydas Sabonis.

== Professional career ==
When he was young, Andriuškevičius was an intriguing prospect because of his height. He developed through the youth academies at Žalgiris Kaunas, where he was tabbed as one of the top young players in the game. He played in 15 Euroleague games for the club during the 2004–05 season, and was originally projected to be one of the top picks in the 2005 NBA draft, but a disappointing season in Europe, and an apparent lack of improvement, sent his draft stock spiraling down. That season, he averaged 1.5 points and 1.1 rebounds per game, in 8.7 minutes played per game in the Euroleague.

Andriuškevičius was drafted by the Orlando Magic with the 44th pick in the 2005 NBA draft. He was then traded to the Cleveland Cavaliers, before being traded to the Chicago Bulls.

On August 18, 2006, Andriuškevičius was traded by the Cavaliers to the Chicago Bulls, for swingman Eddie Basden. On December 21, as a member of the NBA Development League's Dakota Wizards, Andriuškevičius sustained a serious head injury, when he was punched by teammate Awvee Storey, in an attack during practice in Bismarck, North Dakota. The center suffered a fractured skull, a severe concussion, and a two-centimeter hematoma (bruise) on the left side of his brain. Doctors initially thought it would be months before he could speak, but he was able to regain speech within a month, and stated his desire to play basketball within a year. Storey was suspended indefinitely. Days later, Storey had his contract terminated, and he was dismissed from the league. Andriuškevičius did not wish to pursue charges.

On March 12, 2007, Chicago Bulls doctor's cleared Andriuškevičius to participate in contact practices. The Chicago Tribune said it was, "a remarkable recovery from the serious brain injury". On April 6, head coach Scott Skiles, considered moving the player to the active roster, as he soon started practicing. However, Andriuškevičius never logged a regular season appearance for the Bulls.

On August 11, 2007, Andriuškevičius' agent announced that he would play with Joventut Badalona, and he signed with the team five days later, but his contract with the team was cancelled shortly after.

In September 2011, he signed a one-year contract with PAOK in Greece. On 11 January 2016, he signed with former Telemach League champions KK Helios Suns, on a two-year contract.

He has the longest name in NBA history.

== National team career ==
At the 2010 FIBA World Championship, Andriuškevičius played with the senior men's the Lithuanian national basketball team, and with them he won a bronze medal.

== NBA career statistics ==
Legend
GP	Games played	GS	Games started	MPG	Minutes per game
FG%	Field goal percentage	3P%	3-point field goal percentage	FT%	Free throw percentage
RPG	Rebounds per game	APG	Assists per game	SPG	Steals per game
BPG	Blocks per game	PPG	Points per game	**Bold**	Career high

=== Regular season ===
Year	Team	GP	GS	MPG	FG%	3P%	FT%	RPG	APG	SPG	BPG	PPG
2005–06	Cleveland	6	0	1.5	.000	.000	.000	.7	.0	.3	.0	.0
Career		6	0	1.5	.000	.000	.000	.7	.0	.3	.0	.0

== Awards and achievements ==
- 2010 FIBA World Championship, Turkey: Bronze
