= 2005–06 Cleveland Cavaliers season =

NBA professional basketball team season

- Head coach: Mike Brown
- General manager: Danny Ferry
- Owner: Dan Gilbert
- Arena: Quicken Loans Arena

Results
- Record: 50–32 (.610)
- Place: Division: 2nd (Central); Conference: 4th (Eastern)
- Playoff finish: Conference Semifinals (lost to Pistons 3–4)
- Stats at Basketball Reference

Local media
- Television: FSN Ohio; WUAB
- Radio: WTAM

The 2005–06 Cleveland Cavaliers season was the 36th season of NBA basketball in Cleveland, Ohio. The Cavaliers finished the season with a 50–32 record, and a second-place finish in the Central Division, returning to the playoffs for the first time since 1998. In the playoffs, the Cavaliers defeated the Washington Wizards in six games in the first round and reached the semi-finals of the Eastern Conference, where they lost in seven games to the Detroit Pistons. LeBron James was the team's leading scorer and was named to the All-NBA first team. He was also selected to play in the 2006 NBA All-Star Game where he won his first All-Star MVP.

For this season, they added new dark blue road alternate uniforms added side panels to their jerseys and shorts, they remained in use until 2010.

== Offseason ==
=== Free agents ===
Additions
Player	Date	Former team
Larry Hughes	August 4	Washington Wizards
Donyell Marshall	August 4	Toronto Raptors
Damon Jones	September 8	Miami Heat
Zydrunas Ilgauskas	September 13	Cleveland Cavaliers
Alan Henderson	September 17	Dallas Mavericks
Zendon Hamilton	September 30	Milwaukee Bucks
Mike Wilks	September 30	San Antonio Spurs

Subtractions
Player	Date	New team
Scott Williams	April 15	Retired
Robert Traylor	June 15	Gestibérica Vigo
Lucious Harris	June 16	Free agent
Jeff McInnis	August 11	New Jersey Nets
Desagana Diop	August 19	Dallas Mavericks
Dajuan Wagner		Free agent
Jérôme Moïso		Lottomatica Roma

=== Trades ===
June 28, 2005	To Cleveland Cavaliers 2006 2nd round draft pick	To Milwaukee Bucks Jiří Welsch

June 29, 2005	To Cleveland Cavaliers Rights to Martynas Andriuskevicius	To Orlando Magic 2006 2nd round draft pick and cash

== Draft picks ==
Cleveland did not have a draft pick in the 2005 NBA Draft due to trades from previous seasons.

- 1st round pick (#13) traded to Phoenix in Wesley Person deal, sent to Charlotte as part of expansion selection. Used to draft Sean May.
- 2nd round pick (#44) traded to Orlando in Drew Gooden deal. Used to draft Martynas Andriuskevicius who was traded back to Cleveland.

== Roster ==
2005–06 Cleveland Cavaliers roster
Players

Pos.	No.	Player	Height	Weight	DOB	From
C	15	Martynas Andriuskevicius	7 ft 2 in (2.18 m)	240 lb (109 kg)	1986-03-12	Lithuania
PF	90	Drew Gooden	6 ft 10 in (2.08 m)	250 lb (113 kg)	1981-09-24	Kansas
SG	1	Stephen Graham	6 ft 6 in (1.98 m)	215 lb (98 kg)	1982-06-11	Oklahoma State
C	44	Alan Henderson	6 ft 9 in (2.06 m)	240 lb (109 kg)	1972-12-02	Indiana
SG	32	Larry Hughes	6 ft 5 in (1.96 m)	184 lb (83 kg)	1979-01-23	Saint Louis
C	11	Zydrunas Ilgauskas	7 ft 3 in (2.21 m)	260 lb (118 kg)	1975-06-05	Lithuania
SF	33	Luke Jackson	6 ft 7 in (2.01 m)	215 lb (98 kg)	1981-11-06	Oregon
SF	23	LeBron James	6 ft 8 in (2.03 m)	240 lb (109 kg)	1984-12-30	St. Vincent–St. Mary HS (OH)
PG	19	Damon Jones	6 ft 3 in (1.91 m)	190 lb (86 kg)	1976-08-25	Houston
PF	24	Donyell Marshall	6 ft 9 in (2.06 m)	230 lb (104 kg)	1973-05-18	Connecticut
SG	2	Ronald Murray	6 ft 3 in (1.91 m)	197 lb (89 kg)	1979-07-29	Shaw
SG	14	Ira Newble	6 ft 7 in (2.01 m)	220 lb (100 kg)	1975-01-20	Miami (OH)
SG	3	Aleksandar Pavlović	6 ft 7 in (2.01 m)	210 lb (95 kg)	1983-11-15	Serbia
PG	20	Eric Snow	6 ft 3 in (1.91 m)	205 lb (93 kg)	1973-04-24	Michigan State
C	17	Anderson Varejão	6 ft 10 in (2.08 m)	240 lb (109 kg)	1982-09-28	Brazil

Coaches
Head coach
- Mike Brown
Assistant(s)
- Hank Egan
- Melvin Hunt
- Kenny Natt
- Michael Malone

Legend
- (DP) Unsigned draft pick
- (FA) Free agent
- (S) Suspended
- Injured

Roster
Updated: April 12, 2006

== Regular season ==
=== Season standings ===
Central Division	W	L	PCT	GB	Home	Road	Div
y-Detroit Pistons	64	18	.780	-	37–4	27–14	13–3
x-Cleveland Cavaliers	50	32	.610	14	31–10	19–22	11–5
x-Indiana Pacers	41	41	.500	23	27–14	14–27	6–10
x-Chicago Bulls	41	41	.500	23	21–20	20–21	4–12
x-Milwaukee Bucks	40	42	.488	24	25–16	15–26	6–10

Eastern Conference
#	Team	W	L	PCT	GB
1	z-Detroit Pistons	64	18	.780	-
2	y-Miami Heat	52	30	.634	12
3	y-New Jersey Nets	49	33	.598	15
4	x-Cleveland Cavaliers	50	32	.610	14
5	x-Washington Wizards	42	40	.512	22
6	x-Indiana Pacers	41	41	.500	23
7	x-Chicago Bulls	41	41	.500	23
8	x-Milwaukee Bucks	40	42	.488	24
9	Philadelphia 76ers	38	44	.463	26
10	Orlando Magic	36	46	.439	28
11	Boston Celtics	33	49	.402	31
12	Toronto Raptors	27	55	.329	37
13	Charlotte Bobcats	26	56	.317	38
14	Atlanta Hawks	26	56	.317	38
15	New York Knicks	23	59	.280	41

== Game log ==
2005–06 game log
Total: 50–32 (home: 30–11; road: 20–21)
November: 10–4 (home: 7–1; road: 3–3)

Game	Date	Team	Score	High points	High rebounds	High assists	Location Attendance	Record
1	November 2, 2005	New Orleans/Oklahoma City	W 109–87	LeBron James (31)	Donyell Marshall (9)	Larry Hughes (6)	Gund Arena; 20,562	1–0
2	November 4, 2005	@ San Antonio	L 76–102	LeBron James (20)	Donyell Marshall (10)	LeBron James (4)	SBC Center; 18,797	1–1
3	November 5, 2005	@ Memphis	L 106–113	LeBron James (36)	Zydrunas Ilgauskas (11)	LeBron James (6)	FedEx Forum; 17,368	1–2
4	November 7, 2005	@ Toronto	W 105–93	LeBron James (27)	Donyell Marshall (11)	LeBron James (6)	Air Canada Centre; 18,281	2–2
5	November 9, 2005	Seattle	W 112–85	LeBron James (31)	Donyell Marshall, Drew Gooden, Zydrunas Ilgauskas, Alan Henderson (9)	Larry Hughes (5)	Gund Arena; 19,564	3–2
6	November 11, 2005	Memphis	W 89–70	LeBron James (16)	Zydrunas Ilgauskas (12)	Larry Hughes, Eric Snow (5)	Gund Arena; 16,554	4–2
7	November 13, 2005	@ Orlando	W 108–100 (OT)	LeBron James (26)	Larry Hughes (9)	Larry Hughes (7)	TD Waterhouse Centre; 15,414	5–2
8	November 15, 2005	Washington	W 114–99	LeBron James (37)	LeBron James (10)	Larry Hughes (8)	Gund Arena; 17,685	6–2
9	November 18, 2005	Orlando	W 102–84	Zydrunas Ilgauskas (22)	Zydrunas Ilgauskas (11)	Larry Hughes (6)	Gund Arena; 18,591	7–2
10	November 19, 2005	@ Philadelphia	W 123–120	Larry Hughes (37)	Drew Gooden (13)	LeBron James (10)	Wachovia Center; 18,908	8–2
11	November 22, 2005	Boston	W 115–93	LeBron James (36)	Drew Gooden (15)	Eric Snow (9)	Gund Arena; 17,139	9–2
12	November 24, 2005	@ Indiana	L 76–98	LeBron James (19)	LeBron James (10)	LeBron James (4)	Conseco Fieldhouse; 17,243	9–3
13	November 26, 2005	Minnesota	L 85–89	LeBron James (38)	Drew Gooden (12)	Eric Snow (3)	Gund Arena; 20,562	9–4
14	November 30, 2005	L.A. Clippers	W 112–105 (OT)	Zydrunas Ilgauskas (29)	Zydrunas Ilgauskas (10)	LeBron James (9)	Gund Arena; 18,209	10–4

December : 8–6 (home: 6–2; road: 2–4)

Game	Date	Team	Score	High points	High rebounds	High assists	Location Attendance	Record
15	December 2, 2005	@ Seattle	L 108–115	LeBron James (34)	Drew Gooden (7)	LeBron James (8)	KeyArena; 17,072	10–5
16	December 3, 2005	@ L.A. Clippers	L 90–102	LeBron James (30)	Drew Gooden (12)	LeBron James (6)	STAPLES Center; 18,369	10–6
17	December 6, 2005	@ Sacramento	W 102–97	LeBron James (30)	Drew Gooden, Zydrunas Ilgauskas (7)	LeBron James, Larry Hughes (6)	ARCO Arena; 17,317	11–6
18	December 9, 2005	New Jersey	L 100–109	LeBron James (32)	Donyell Marshall (10)	Eric Snow (5)	Gund Arena; 18,177	11–7
19	December 10, 2005	@ Milwaukee	L 106–111	LeBron James (52)	LeBron James, Donyell Marshall (7)	LeBron James (7)	Bradley Center; 18,717	11–8
20	December 13, 2005	Atlanta	L 94–100	LeBron James (39)	Drew Gooden (11)	LeBron James, Eric Snow (6)	Gund Arena; 17,114	11–9
21	December 15, 2005	Denver	W 94–85	LeBron James (26)	Donyell Marshall (12)	LeBron James (9)	Gund Arena; 17,182	12–9
22	December 17, 2005	Miami	W 115–107	LeBron James (41)	Donyell Marshall (13)	LeBron James (10)	Gund Arena; 20,562	13–9
23	December 20, 2005	Utah	W 110–85	LeBron James (25)	Zydrunas Ilgauskas (7)	Eric Snow (6)	Gund Arena; 19,543	14–9
24	December 22, 2005	@ Chicago	W 108–100	LeBron James (37)	Zydrunas Ilgauskas (11)	LeBron James (6)	United Center; 21,874	15–9
25	December 23, 2005	Indiana	W 94–89	Drew Gooden (21)	Drew Gooden (12)	LeBron James (9)	Gund Arena; 18,757	16–9
26	December 26, 2005	Chicago	W 102–91	LeBron James (32)	Zydrunas Ilgauskas (14)	LeBron James, Eric Snow (6)	Gund Arena; 20,562	17–9
27	December 27, 2005	@ New Jersey	L 91–96	LeBron James (31)	Donyell Marshall (14)	LeBron James (8)	Continental Airlines Arena; 20,098	17–10
28	December 31, 2005	Detroit	W 97–84	LeBron James (30)	Drew Gooden (13)	LeBron James (7)	Gund Arena; 20,562	18–10

January : 8–7 (home: 3–2; road: 5–5)

Game	Date	Team	Score	High points	High rebounds	High assists	Location Attendance	Record
29	January 4, 2006	@ Milwaukee	W 91–84	LeBron James (32)	LeBron James (11)	LeBron James (11)	Bradley Center; 15,785	19–10
30	January 5, 2006	Houston	L 81–90	LeBron James (32)	Zydrunas Ilgauskas (10)	LeBron James, Eric Snow (5)	Gund Arena; 18,019	19–11
31	January 7, 2006	Milwaukee	W 96–88	LeBron James (35)	Drew Gooden (17)	LeBron James (6)	Gund Arena; 19,840	20–11
32	January 10, 2006	New York	L 84–92	LeBron James (36)	Drew Gooden (12)	LeBron James (7)	Gund Arena; 18,064	20–12
33	January 12, 2006	@ L.A. Lakers	L 98–99	Zydrunas Ilgauskas (29)	Drew Gooden (11)	LeBron James (9)	STAPLES Center; 18,997	20–13
34	January 14, 2006	@ Phoenix	L 106–115	LeBron James (46)	Zydrunas Ilgauskas (12)	LeBron James (8)	America West Arena; 18,422	20–14
35	January 15, 2006	@ Portland	L 106–115	LeBron James (29)	LeBron James (13)	LeBron James (7)	Rose Garden Arena; 19,383	20–15
36	January 18, 2006	@ Denver	L 89–90	LeBron James (24)	Alan Henderson (12)	LeBron James (9)	Pepsi Center; 19,009	20–16
37	January 20, 2006	@ Golden State	L 79–99	Drew Gooden (16)	Zydrunas Ilgauskas (11)	LeBron James (6)	Oakland Arena; 20,205	20–17
38	January 21, 2006	@ Utah	W 108–90	LeBron James (51)	Zydrunas Ilgauskas (8)	LeBron James (8)	Delta Center; 19,340	21–17
39	January 24, 2006	Indiana	W 96–66	LeBron James (23)	Drew Gooden (10)	LeBron James (8)	Gund Arena; 19,069	22–17
40	January 25, 2006	@ Atlanta	W 106–97	LeBron James (38)	Drew Gooden (14)	Eric Snow (8)	Philips Arena; 16,089	23–17
41	January 27, 2006	@ Indiana	W 93–89	LeBron James (30)	LeBron James (7)	LeBron James (9)	Conseco Fieldhouse; 18,345	24–17
42	January 29, 2006	Phoenix	W 113–106	LeBron James (44)	LeBron James (11)	LeBron James (7)	Gund Arena; 20,562	25–17
43	January 30, 2006	@ Charlotte	W 103–91	LeBron James (30)	Drew Gooden (12)	Eric Snow (7)	Charlotte Bobcats Arena; 17,142	26–17

February : 6–8 (home: 4–4; road: 2–4)

Game	Date	Team	Score	High points	High rebounds	High assists	Location Attendance	Record
44	February 1, 2006	New Jersey	W 91–85	LeBron James (26)	LeBron James (11)	LeBron James (10)	Gund Arena; 19,460	27–17
45	February 2, 2006	@ Miami	L 73–101	LeBron James (29)	Zydrunas Ilgauskas, Drew Gooden (8)	LeBron James (7)	AmericanAirlines Arena; 20,168	27–18
46	February 4, 2006	Philadelphia	L 95–100	LeBron James (31)	Zydrunas Ilgauskas (11)	LeBron James (6)	Gund Arena; 20,562	27–19
47	February 6, 2006	Milwaukee	W 89–86	LeBron James (22)	LeBron James (9)	LeBron James (12)	Gund Arena; 19,126	28–19
48	February 8, 2006	@ Minnesota	W 97–91	LeBron James (35)	Donyell Marshall (13)	LeBron James (8)	Target Center; 17,093	29–19
49	February 10, 2006	@ Washington	L 89–101	LeBron James (18)	LeBron James, Drew Gooden (9)	LeBron James (8)	MCI Center; 20,173	29–20
50	February 11, 2006	Golden State	L 91–99	LeBron James (33)	Zydrunas Ilgauskas (8)	Damon Jones (7)	Gund Arena; 20,562	29–21
51	February 13, 2006	San Antonio	W 101–87	LeBron James (44)	Zydrunas Ilgauskas (11)	Eric Snow (6)	Gund Arena; 19,486	30–21
52	February 15, 2006	@ Boston	W 113–109 (2OT)	LeBron James (43)	LeBron James (12)	LeBron James (11)	TD Garden; 17,915	31–21
53	February 21, 2006	Orlando	W 105–92	LeBron James (26)	Zydrunas Ilgauskas (13)	LeBron James (9)	Gund Arena; 20,562	32–21
54	February 22, 2006	@ Philadelphia	L 107–116	LeBron James (33)	Zydrunas Ilgauskas, Drew Gooden (9)	Eric Snow (8)	Wachovia Center; 20,196	32–22
55	February 24, 2006	Washington	L 94–102	LeBron James (25)	Zydrunas Ilgauskas (9)	LeBron James (9)	Gund Arena; 20,562	32–23
56	February 26, 2006	@ Detroit	L 78–90	LeBron James (22)	LeBron James, Zydrunas Ilgauskas (9)	LeBron James (7)	The Palace of Auburn Hills; 22,076	32–24
57	February 27, 2006	Detroit	L 72–84	LeBron James (26)	Zydrunas Ilgauskas (15)	LeBron James (6)	Gund Arena; 19,286	32–25

March : 10–4 (home: 7–1; road: 3–3)

Game	Date	Team	Score	High points	High rebounds	High assists	Location Attendance	Record
58	March 1, 2006	Sacramento	L 90–97	LeBron James, Ronald Murray, Zydrunas Ilgauskas (19)	LeBron James (7)	LeBron James (12)	Gund Arena; 17,363	32–26
59	March 2, 2006	@ Chicago	W 92–91	LeBron James (33)	LeBron James (11)	LeBron James, Eric Snow (8)	United Center; 20,726	33–26
60	March 5, 2006	Chicago	L 72–91	LeBron James (37)	Anderson Varejão (13)	LeBron James, Eric Snow (7)	Gund Arena; 20,562	34–26
61	March 7, 2006	Toronto	W 106–99	Ronald Murray (24)	LeBron James (12)	Eric Snow (11)	Gund Arena; 18,077	35–26
62	March 8, 2006	@ Toronto	W 98–97	LeBron James (35)	Drew Gooden, Donyell Marshall (8)	LeBron James, Eric Snow (6)	Air Canada Centre; 19,800	36–26
63	March 10, 2006	@ Orlando	L 73–102	LeBron James (25)	Drew Gooden (12)	Eric Snow (5)	TD Waterhouse Centre; 17,283	36–27
64	March 12, 2006	@ Miami	L 92–98	LeBron James (47)	Drew Gooden (12)	LeBron James, Eric Snow (4)	AmericanAirlines Arena; 20,268	36–28
65	March 14, 2006	@ Dallas	L 87–91	LeBron James (36)	Zydrunas Ilgauskas (13)	LeBron James, Eric Snow (5)	American Airlines Center; 20,425	36–29
66	March 17, 2006	Portland	W 99–84	LeBron James (27)	Drew Gooden (14)	LeBron James, Eric Snow (5)	Gund Arena; 20,562	37–29
67	March 19, 2006	L.A. Lakers	W 96–95	LeBron James (29)	Drew Gooden (9)	LeBron James (7)	Gund Arena; 20,562	38–29
68	March 22, 2006	Charlotte	W 120–118 (OT)	LeBron James (37)	LeBron James (11)	LeBron James (12)	Gund Arena; 18,550	39–29
69	March 24, 2006	Boston	W 94–82	LeBron James (36)	Zydrunas Ilgauskas (11)	LeBron James (8)	Gund Arena; 20,562	40–29
70	March 26, 2006	@ Houston	W 104–102 (OT)	LeBron James (36)	Zydrunas Ilgauskas, Drew Gooden (8)	Damon Jones (6)	Toyota Center; 16,839	41–29
71	March 29, 2006	Dallas	W 107–94	LeBron James (46)	Zydrunas Ilgauskas (9)	Eric Snow (5)	Gund Arena; 19,401	42–29

April : 8–3 (home: 4–0; road: 4–3)

Game	Date	Team	Score	High points	High rebounds	High assists	Location Attendance	Record
72	April 1, 2006	Miami	W 106–99	LeBron James (47)	LeBron James (12)	LeBron James (9)	Gund Arena; 20,562	43–29
73	April 2, 2006	@ Charlotte	W 101–97	LeBron James (35)	LeBron James (12)	LeBron James (8)	Charlotte Bobcats Arena; 18,491	44–29
74	April 4, 2006	Philadelphia	W 124–91	LeBron James (37)	Anderson Varejão (14)	LeBron James (7)	Gund Arena; 18,581	45–29
75	April 5, 2006	@ New York	L 94–96	LeBron James (36)	Drew Gooden, Anderson Varejão (12)	LeBron James (7)	Madison Square Garden; 19,763	45–30
76	April 8, 2006	@ New Jersey	W 108–102	LeBron James (37)	Drew Gooden (9)	LeBron James (7)	Continental Airlines Arena; 19,048	46–30
77	April 10, 2006	@ New Orleans/Oklahoma City	W 103–101	LeBron James (32)	Anderson Varejão (8)	LeBron James (6)	Ford Center; 19,187	47–30
78	April 12, 2006	@ Detroit	L 73–96	LeBron James (22)	Zydrunas Ilgauskas (8)	Damon Jones (4)	The Palace of Auburn Hills; 22,076	47–31
79	April 13, 2006	New York	W 91–87	Larry Hughes (26)	Zydrunas Ilgauskas (14)	Larry Hughes (6)	Gund Arena; 20,562	48–31
80	April 16, 2006	@ Washington	L 92–104	LeBron James (17)	Anderson Varejão, Drew Gooden (9)	LeBron James, Ronald Murray (4)	MCI Center; 18,405	48–32
81	April 17, 2006	@ Boston	W 93–88	Larry Hughes (21)	Larry Hughes (5)	Eric Snow (9)	TD Garden; 18,624	49–32
82	April 19, 2006	Atlanta	W 100–99	Ronald Murray (19)	Anderson Varejão (18)	Ronald Murray (6)	Gund Arena; 20,562	50–32

2005–06 schedule

== Player stats ==
Legend
GP	Games played	GS	Games started	MPG	Minutes per game
FG%	Field-goal percentage	3P%	3-point field-goal percentage	FT%	Free-throw percentage
RPG	Rebounds per game	APG	Assists per game	SPG	Steals per game
BPG	Blocks per game	PPG	Points per game

Regular Season

Player	GP	GS	MPG	FG%	3P%	FT%	RPG	APG	SPG	BPG	PPG
LeBron James	79	79	42.5	48.0%	33.5%	73.8%	1.56	8.4	6.6	7.0	31.4
Zydrunas Ilgauskas	78	78	29.3	50.6%	0.0%	83.4%	.49	1.74	1.2	7.6	15.6
Larry Hughes	36	31	35.6	40.9%	36.8%	75.6%	1.47	.58	3.6	4.5	15.5
Flip Murray	28	25	36.7	44.8%	30.8%	70.2%	1.36	.25	2.8	2.4	13.5
Drew Gooden	79	79	27.5	51.2%	33.3%	68.2%	.66	.62	.7	8.4	10.7
Donyell Marshall	81	0	25.6	39.5%	32.4%	74.8%	.73	.51	.7	6.1	9.3
Damon Jones	82	7	25.5	38.7%	37.7%	64.0%	.45	.01	2.1	1.6	6.7
Eric Snow	82	82	28.8	40.9%	10.0%	68.8%	.93	.23	4.2	2.4	4.8
Anderson Varejão	48	4	15.8	52.7%	0.0%	51.3%	.65	.40	.4	4.9	4.6
Sasha Pavlović	53	19	15.3	41.0%	36.5%	65.3%	.36	.11	.5	1.5	4.5
Stephen Graham	13	0	9.0	42.4%	0.0%	88.9%	.23	.15	.2	1.3	2.8
Luke Jackson	36	0	8.8	34.1%	33.3%	78.8%	.31	.06	.7	1.1	2.7
Alan Henderson	51	3	10.4	51.6%	0.0%	67.3%	.18	.24	.2	2.7	2.5
Zendon Hamilton	11	0	4.2	53.8%	0.0%	68.8%	.03	.00	.0	1.0	2.3
Ira Newble	36	3	9.8	29.3%	23.1%	68.8%	.14	.28	.3	1.6	1.3
Mike Wilks	37	0	6.6	28.8%	14.3%	50.0%	.02	.00	.5	.7	1.1
Martynas Andriuskevicius	6	0	1.5	0.0%	0.0%	0.0%	.33	.00	.0	.7	0.0

Playoffs

Player	GP	GS	MPG	FG%	3P%	FT%	RPG	APG	SPG	BPG	PPG
LeBron James	13	13	46.5	47.6%	33.3%	73.7%	1.38	.69	5.8	8.1	30.8
Larry Hughes	9	8	37.3	31.9%	27.8%	74.2%	2.20	.11	4.0	3.0	11.1
Zydrunas Ilgauskas	13	13	27.2	45.4%	0.0%	75.0%	.38	2.08	.8	6.3	10.4
Donyell Marshall	13	0	26.5	43.3%	39.1%	88.2%	.54	.69	.6	5.6	9.5
Drew Gooden	13	13	21.7	52.9%	0.0%	94.4%	.23	.15	.6	7.5	8.2
Flip Murray	13	5	30.7	33.0%	20.8%	81.3%	.69	.15	1.6	3.2	8.1
Anderson Varejão	13	0	18.3	62.0%	0.0%	70.3%	.69	.15	.2	4.5	6.8
Eric Snow	13	13	31.4	42.0%	0.0%	75.9%	.85	.23	2.8	3.3	6.6
Damon Jones	13	0	13.9	30.8%	27.8%	75.0%	.15	.00	.9	1.2	1.8
Ira Newble	5	0	2.2	1.000%	1.000%	0.0%	.20	.00	.0	.4	1.4
Alan Henderson	2	0	4.5	0.0%	0.0%	0.0%	.00	.00	.0	1.0	0.0
Sasha Pavlović	3	0	1.3	0.0%	0.0%	0.0%	.00	.00	.0	.3	0.0

== Playoffs ==
2006 marked the first time LeBron James made the playoffs in his career, and the first time the Cavaliers had made the playoffs since 1998 with Shawn Kemp. They came off a playoff series win vs the Wizards, while the Pistons came in off a 4–1 win vs the 8th seeded Bucks. Detroit was expected to win the series, and took a commanding two games to none lead with two wins at the Palace of Auburn Hills. James and the Cavaliers would not be intimidated however, and won their two games at home to tie the series 2–2. Coming into game 5, both teams were confident, but the Pistons were expected to pull out the win easily. The game was low scoring throughout as usual in this series, with Cleveland holding a 68 to 66 lead throughout 3 quarters. With the game tied at 84 with 26 seconds left in regulation, Drew Gooden came through and hit a layup to give Cleveland the lead that they would never squander. James led the Cavs with 32 and this brought the series to Cleveland up 3–2, quite shockingly. Detroit held on to a 2-point win to win game 6, and won game 7 at home to seal the deal, but this was the coming out party for the Cavaliers in the playoffs, scaring the 2004 champs.

2006 playoff game log
First Round: 4–2 (home: 2–1; road: 2–1)

Game	Date	Team	Score	High points	High rebounds	High assists	Location Attendance	Series
1	April 22	Washington	W 97–86	LeBron James (32)	LeBron James (11)	LeBron James (11)	Gund Arena; 20,562	1–0
2	April 25	Washington	L 84–89	LeBron James (26)	Drew Gooden (16)	Eric Snow (4)	Gund Arena; 20,562	1–1
3	April 28	@ Washington	W 97–96	LeBron James (41)	Ilgauskas, Gooden (8)	James, Snow (3)	MCI Center; 20,173	2–1
4	April 30	@ Washington	L 96–106	LeBron James (45)	Drew Gooden (11)	LeBron James (6)	MCI Center; 20,173	2–2
5	May 3	Washington	W 121–120 (OT)	LeBron James (38)	Donyell Marshall (11)	LeBron James (5)	Gund Arena; 20,562	3–2
6	May 5	@ Washington	W 114–113 (OT)	LeBron James (32)	Anderson Varejão (10)	Larry Hughes (12)	MCI Center; 20,173	4–2

Conference Semifinals: 3–4 (home: 2–1; road: 1–3)

Game	Date	Team	Score	High points	High rebounds	High assists	Location Attendance	Series
1	May 7	@ Detroit	L 86–113	LeBron James (22)	Anderson Varejão (8)	James, Murray (4)	The Palace of Auburn Hills; 22,076	0–1
2	May 9	@ Detroit	L 91–97	LeBron James (30)	LeBron James (14)	LeBron James (7)	The Palace of Auburn Hills; 22,076	0–2
3	May 13	Detroit	W 86–77	LeBron James (21)	LeBron James (10)	LeBron James (10)	Gund Arena; 20,562	1–2
4	May 15	Detroit	W 74–72	LeBron James (22)	LeBron James (8)	LeBron James (9)	Gund Arena; 20,562	2–2
5	May 17	@ Detroit	W 86–84	LeBron James (32)	Donyell Marshall (13)	Eric Snow (7)	The Palace of Auburn Hills; 22,076	3–2
6	May 19	Detroit	L 82–84	LeBron James (32)	LeBron James (11)	Eric Snow (6)	Gund Arena; 20,562	3–3
7	May 21	@ Detroit	L 61–79	LeBron James (27)	LeBron James (8)	Larry Hughes (5)	The Palace of Auburn Hills; 22,076	3–4

2005–06 schedule

== Awards and records ==
=== Awards ===
- LeBron James was named the Eastern Conference Player of the Week for games played from November 14 through November 20.
- LeBron James was named the Eastern Conference Player of the Week for games played from January 24 through January 30.
- LeBron James was named the Eastern Conference Player of the Week for games played from March 14 through March 20.
- LeBron James was named the Eastern Conference Player of the Week for games played from March 21 through March 27.
- LeBron James was named the Eastern Conference Player of the Week for games played from March 27 through April 2. He became the first player in NBA history to win the award three consecutive weeks.
- LeBron James was named the Eastern Conference Player of the Month for the month of November, the third time he has won the award.
- LeBron James was named the Eastern Conference Player of the Month for the month of March, the fourth time he has won the award.
- LeBron James was named to the All-NBA first team. James is the youngest first-teamer in NBA history and only the second Cavalier (Mark Price) to receive the honors.
- LeBron James finished in 2nd place in league MVP voting (Steve Nash).

=== Records ===
- On November 19, vs. the Philadelphia 76ers, Larry Hughes (37) and LeBron James (36) became the first two teammates in franchise history to score 35 points or more in the same game.
- LeBron James set the franchise single-season record for points with 2,478.
- LeBron James set other franchise records for: scoring average (31.4), field goals made (875), field goals attempted (1873), free throws made (601), and free throws attempted (841).
- LeBron James set the franchise record for points in a single postseason with 400.
- In Game 6 of the Washington Wizards First Round series, the team set a franchise record for bench points with 57.
- LeBron James set the franchise record for points in a single postseason series with 214.
- Mike Brown became the first coach in franchise history to win a playoff series in his first year.
- For the season, LeBron James led the team in scoring for a game 72 times, a franchise record.
- The Cavaliers finished the season 5–0 in overtime games, a franchise record for wins and %.

=== Milestones ===
- On November 13, LeBron James became the youngest player in NBA history to score 4,000 career points (20 years, 318 days).
- On January 21, LeBron James became the youngest player in NBA history to score 5,000 career points (21 years, 22 days).
- On March 29, LeBron James became the youngest player in NBA history to score 6,000 career points (21 years, 89 days).
- On April 13, Mike Brown won his 48th game as head coach, the most by a rookie coach in franchise history.
- For the season, LeBron James made 19/29 field goals attempts in the last two minutes of a one-possession game. He led the league in that statistic.

=== All-Star ===
- LeBron James came in third in Eastern Conference votes received and was voted in as a starter for the 2006 NBA All-Star Game for the 2nd time in his career. He became the first Cavalier in team history to start multiple All-Star games and the 7th to play in multiple games.
- LeBron James became the youngest All-Star Game MVP in NBA history with 29 points, 6 rebounds and 2 assists in the East's 122–120 win.
- LeBron James participated in the Skills Challenge and finished in 2nd place.
- LeBron James led his team in points, rebounds and assists in a game 16 times, a league-high.

== Transactions ==
=== Trades ===
February 23, 2006	To Cleveland Cavaliers Flip Murray	To Seattle SuperSonics Mike Wilks and cash considerations

February 23, 2006	To Cleveland Cavaliers Lee Nailon and a 2nd round pick	To Philadelphia 76ers 2nd round pick

=== Free agents ===
Additions
Player	Date	Former team
Zendon Hamilton^{*}	January 10	Cleveland Cavaliers
Stephen Graham^{**}	February 24	Chicago Bulls

Subtractions
Player	Date	New team
Zendon Hamilton^{*}	January 5	Free agent
Zendon Hamilton^{*}	January 30	Philadelphia 76ers
Lee Nailon^{***}	February 24	Philadelphia 76ers

^{*}Waived by team mid-season and later re-signed to two 10-day contracts.
^{**}Signed to two successive 10-day contracts and then the remainder of the season.
^{***}Traded for and then immediately waived before playing in a game.

=== Development League ===
- On January 22, Martynas Andriuskevicius was assigned to the NBDL's Arkansas Rimrockers.
- On February 1, Martynas Andriuskevicius was recalled from the Rimrockers.
- On March 2, Martynas Andriuskevicius was reassigned to the Rimrockers.
- On March 6, Martynas Andriuskevicius was recalled from the Rimrockers.
- On March 16, Martynas Andriuskevicius was reassigned to the Rimrockers.
- On April 12, Martynas Andriuskevicius was recalled from the Rimrockers.
