= 2005–06 Washington Wizards season =

NBA professional basketball team season

- Head coach: Eddie Jordan
- Owners: Raul Fernandez, Abe Pollin
- Arena: MCI Center, Verizon Center

Results
- Record: 42–40 (.512)
- Place: Division: 2nd (Southeast); Conference: 5th (Eastern)
- Playoff finish: First Round (lost to Cavaliers 2–4)
- Stats at Basketball Reference

Local media
- Television: WDCW; CSN Mid-Atlantic
- Radio: WTEM

The 2005–06 Washington Wizards season was the team's 45th in the NBA. They began the season hoping to improve upon their 45-37 output from the previous season. They came up three games short of matching it, finishing 42–40, but qualified for the playoffs for the second straight season. In January 2006, the MCI Center's name was changed to Verizon Center, which lasted until 2017.

== Draft picks ==
Round	Pick	Player	Position	Nationality	College
2	49	Andray Blatche	PF	United States	South Kent (HS)

== Roster ==
2005-06 Washington Wizards roster
Players

Pos.	No.	Player	Height	Weight	DOB	From
PG	0	Gilbert Arenas	6 ft 4 in (1.93 m)	215 lb (98 kg)	1982-01-06	Arizona
PF	32	Andray Blatche	6 ft 11 in (2.11 m)	260 lb (118 kg)	1986-08-22	South Kent School (HS)
C	52	Calvin Booth	6 ft 11 in (2.11 m)	250 lb (113 kg)	1976-05-07	Penn State
SG	3	Caron Butler	6 ft 7 in (2.01 m)	228 lb (103 kg)	1980-03-13	Connecticut
PG	6	Antonio Daniels	6 ft 4 in (1.93 m)	195 lb (88 kg)	1975-03-19	Bowling Green
SG	24	Jarvis Hayes	6 ft 8 in (2.03 m)	220 lb (100 kg)	1981-08-09	Georgia
C	33	Brendan Haywood	7 ft 0 in (2.13 m)	263 lb (119 kg)	1979-11-27	North Carolina
PF	4	Antawn Jamison	6 ft 9 in (2.06 m)	235 lb (107 kg)	1976-06-12	North Carolina
SF	1	Jared Jeffries	6 ft 11 in (2.11 m)	240 lb (109 kg)	1981-11-25	Indiana
C	34	Peter John Ramos	7 ft 3 in (2.21 m)	295 lb (134 kg)	1985-05-13	Puerto Rico
C	51	Michael Ruffin	6 ft 9 in (2.06 m)	248 lb (112 kg)	1977-01-21	Tulsa
SF	35	Awvee Storey	6 ft 6 in (1.98 m)	225 lb (102 kg)	1977-04-18	Arizona State
PG	21	Donell Taylor	6 ft 6 in (1.98 m)	180 lb (82 kg)	1982-07-26	UAB
SG	12	Billy Thomas	6 ft 5 in (1.96 m)	220 lb (100 kg)	1975-12-23	Kansas
C	36	Etan Thomas	6 ft 10 in (2.08 m)	260 lb (118 kg)	1978-04-01	Syracuse

Coaches
Head coach
- (United States) Eddie Jordan
Assistant(s)
- Phil Hubbard
- Mike O'Koren
- Wes Unseld Jr.
- Tom Young
- Eric Waters (trainer)

Legend
- (DP) Unsigned draft pick
- (FA) Free agent
- (S) Suspended
- Injured

Roster

== Regular season ==
=== Standings ===
Southeast Division	W	L	PCT	GB	Home	Road	Div
y-Miami Heat	52	30	.634	-	31–10	21–20	13–3
x-Washington Wizards	42	40	.512	10	27–14	15–26	8–8
Orlando Magic	36	46	.439	16	26–15	10–31	9–7
Charlotte Bobcats	26	56	.317	26	17–24	9–32	5–11
Atlanta Hawks	26	56	.317	26	18–23	8–33	5–11

Eastern Conference
#	Team	W	L	PCT	GB
1	z-Detroit Pistons	64	18	.780	-
2	y-Miami Heat	52	30	.634	12
3	y-New Jersey Nets	49	33	.598	15
4	x-Cleveland Cavaliers	50	32	.610	14
5	x-Washington Wizards	42	40	.512	22
6	x-Indiana Pacers	41	41	.500	23
7	x-Chicago Bulls	41	41	.500	23
8	x-Milwaukee Bucks	40	42	.488	24
9	Philadelphia 76ers	38	44	.463	26
10	Orlando Magic	36	46	.439	28
11	Boston Celtics	33	49	.402	31
12	Toronto Raptors	27	55	.329	37
13	Charlotte Bobcats	26	56	.317	38
14	Atlanta Hawks	26	56	.317	38
15	New York Knicks	23	59	.280	41

== Playoffs ==
2006 playoff game log
First Round: 2–4 (home: 1–2; road: 1–2)

Game	Date	Team	Score	High points	High rebounds	High assists	Location Attendance	Series
1	April 22	@ Cleveland	L 86–97	Gilbert Arenas (26)	Antawn Jamison (7)	Antonio Daniels (6)	Quicken Loans Arena; 20,562	0–1
2	April 25	@ Cleveland	W 89–84	Gilbert Arenas (30)	Caron Butler (9)	Gilbert Arenas (6)	Quicken Loans Arena; 20,562	1–1
3	April 28	Cleveland	L 96–97	Gilbert Arenas (34)	Caron Butler (11)	Daniels, Jamison (3)	Verizon Center; 20,173	1–2
4	April 30	Cleveland	W 106–96	Gilbert Arenas (34)	Jared Jeffries (11)	Gilbert Arenas (6)	Verizon Center; 20,173	2–2
5	May 3	@ Cleveland	L 120–121 (OT)	Gilbert Arenas (44)	Caron Butler (11)	Antonio Daniels (7)	Quicken Loans Arena; 20,562	2–3
6	May 5	Cleveland	L 113–114 (OT)	Gilbert Arenas (36)	Caron Butler (20)	Gilbert Arenas (11)	Verizon Center; 20,173	2–4

2006 schedule

== Player statistics ==
Legend
GP	Games played	GS	Games started	MPG	Minutes per game
FG%	Field-goal percentage	3P%	3-point field-goal percentage	FT%	Free-throw percentage
RPG	Rebounds per game	APG	Assists per game	SPG	Steals per game
BPG	Blocks per game	PPG	Points per game

=== Regular season ===
Player	GP	GS	MPG	FG%	3P%	FT%	RPG	APG	SPG	BPG	PPG
Antawn Jamison	82	80	40.1	.442	.394	.731	9.3	1.9	1.1	.1	20.5
Gilbert Arenas	80	80	42.3	.447	.369	.820	3.5	6.1	2.0	.3	29.3
Antonio Daniels	80	17	28.5	.418	.228	.845	2.2	3.6	.7	.1	9.6
Brendan Haywood	79	70	23.8	.514		.585	5.9	.6	.4	1.3	7.3
Jared Jeffries	77	77	25.3	.451	.320	.589	4.9	1.9	.8	.6	6.4
Michael Ruffin	76	4	13.3	.442	.000	.500	3.6	.4	.4	.4	1.4
Caron Butler	75	54	36.1	.455	.342	.870	6.2	2.5	1.7	.2	17.6
Etan Thomas	71	9	15.8	.533		.600	3.9	.2	.3	1.0	4.7
Donell Taylor	51	1	9.1	.390	.235	.698	1.0	.9	.6	.1	2.7
Calvin Booth	33	2	7.6	.426	.500	.556	1.6	.4	.3	.3	1.4
Andray Blatche	29	0	6.0	.388	.231	.833	1.3	.3	.2	.2	2.2
Chucky Atkins^{†}	28	2	19.7	.379	.359	.710	1.6	2.5	.5	.0	6.7
Awvee Storey	25	1	4.6	.390	.429	.571	.9	.2	.1	.0	1.7
Jarvis Hayes	21	13	24.6	.421	.362	.833	3.6	1.3	.8	.0	9.3
Billy Thomas	17	0	7.7	.325	.333	1.000	.8	.5	.6	.1	2.2

=== Playoffs ===
Player	GP	GS	MPG	FG%	3P%	FT%	RPG	APG	SPG	BPG	PPG
Gilbert Arenas	6	6	47.3	.464	.435	.771	5.5	5.3	2.2	.7	34.0
Caron Butler	6	6	43.7	.416	.214	.828	10.5	2.7	2.0	.7	18.5
Antawn Jamison	6	6	42.2	.424	.313	.778	7.2	3.0	1.0	.3	19.2
Jared Jeffries	6	6	35.8	.395	.143	.765	6.2	1.5	.2	1.2	8.0
Brendan Haywood	6	6	25.8	.682		.520	3.2	.8	.3	1.8	7.2
Antonio Daniels	6	0	36.0	.538	.273	.909	2.8	3.3	.5	.2	13.2
Michael Ruffin	6	0	11.7	.500		.000	2.7	.7	.2	.3	.3
Etan Thomas	3	0	6.0	.400		.500	2.0	.0	.7	.7	2.0
Billy Thomas	3	0	4.7	.000	.000	.500	.3	.0	.0	.0	.7
Donell Taylor	1	0	3.0	.000	.000		.0	1.0	1.0	.0	.0

- ^{†} Denotes player spent time with another team in the season. Stats reflect time with the Wizards only.

== Awards and records ==
- Gilbert Arenas, All-NBA Third Team

== Transactions ==
Transactions listed are from July 1, 2005, to June 30, 2006.

August 2, 2005- Traded Kwame Brown and Laron Profit to the Los Angeles Lakers for Chucky Atkins and Caron Butler. Signed Antonio Daniels as a free agent.

September 7, 2005- Signed Calvin Booth as a free agent.

October 3, 2005- Signed Awvee Storey as a free agent. Signed Billy Thomas as a free agent.

November 10, 2005- Signed Donell Taylor as a free agent.

January 17, 2006- Waived Chucky Atkins.

February 24, 2006- Signed Billy Thomas to two 10-day contracts, then signed to a contract for the rest of the season.

June 28, 2006- Drafted Oleksiy Pecherov in the 1st round (18th pick) of the 2006 NBA Draft. Drafted Vladimir Veremeenko in the 2nd round (48th pick) of the 2006 NBA Draft.
