= 2005–06 Philadelphia 76ers season =

NBA professional basketball team season

- Head coach: Maurice Cheeks
- Arena: Wachovia Center

Results
- Record: 38–44 (.463)
- Place: Division: 2nd (Atlantic); Conference: 9th (Eastern)
- Playoff finish: Did not qualify
- Stats at Basketball Reference

Local media
- Television: WPSG; CSN Philadelphia
- Radio: WIP/WPHT

The 2005–06 Philadelphia 76ers season was the 67th season of the franchise, 57th in the National Basketball Association (NBA). Former Sixers player Maurice Cheeks spent his first season as the coach of the Sixers, and it was the last full season Allen Iverson would spend with the Sixers before getting traded to the Denver Nuggets the following season. He was also selected for the 2006 NBA All-Star Game.

== Key dates ==
- June 28: The 2005 NBA draft took place in New York City, New York.
- July 1: The free agency period started.
- October 11: The Sixers pre-season started with a game against the Houston Rockets.
- November 1: The Sixers season started with a game against the Milwaukee Bucks.
- April 15: The Sixers are eliminated from the playoff hunt when the Milwaukee Bucks secure the eighth playoff spot after a Sixers' loss to the Orlando Magic.
- April 18: The Sixers beat the New Jersey Nets in the last home game of the season, which was designated as Fan Appreciation Night. This was despite starters Allen Iverson and Chris Webber not arriving until tip-off, an action which would frustrate fans.

== Draft picks ==
Philadelphia's selections from the 2005 NBA draft in New York, New York.

Round	Pick	Player	Position	Nationality	College
2	45	Louis Williams	Point Guard	United States	South Gwinnett HS (Snellville, GA)

== Roster ==
Philadelphia 76ers roster
Players

Pos.	No.	Player	Height	Weight	DOB	From
SF	21	Matt Barnes	6 ft 7 in (2.01 m)	235 lb (107 kg)		UCLA
PF	31	Michael Bradley	6 ft 9 in (2.06 m)	227 lb (103 kg)		Villanova
C	1	Samuel Dalembert	6 ft 11 in (2.11 m)	249 lb (113 kg)		Seton Hall
SG	33	Willie Green	6 ft 3 in (1.91 m)	201 lb (91 kg)		Detroit Mercy
C	45	Steven Hunter	7 ft 0 in (2.13 m)	240 lb (109 kg)		DePaul
SF	9	Andre Iguodala	6 ft 6 in (1.98 m)	207 lb (94 kg)		Arizona
PG	3	Allen Iverson	6 ft 0 in (1.83 m)	163 lb (74 kg)		Georgetown
SF	26	Kyle Korver	6 ft 6 in (1.98 m)	211 lb (96 kg)		Creighton
PG	12	Kevin Ollie	6 ft 2 in (1.88 m)	196 lb (89 kg)		Connecticut
PF	42	Shavlik Randolph	6 ft 10 in (2.08 m)	240 lb (109 kg)		Duke
SG	7	John Salmons	6 ft 6 in (1.98 m)	207 lb (94 kg)		Miami (FL)
PF	4	Chris Webber	6 ft 10 in (2.08 m)	244 lb (111 kg)		Michigan
PG	23	Louis Williams	6 ft 2 in (1.88 m)	174 lb (79 kg)		South Gwinnett High School

Coaches
Head coach
- Maurice Cheeks (UTEP)
Assistant(s)
- John Loyer (Akron)
- Jim Lynam (Saint Joseph's)
- Bernard Smith (East Stroudsburg)

Legend
- (DP) Unsigned draft pick
- (FA) Free agent
- (S) Suspended
- Injured

Roster
Updated: 2006-05-23

== Regular season ==
=== Season standings ===
Atlantic Division	W	L	PCT	GB	Home	Road	Div
y-New Jersey Nets	49	33	.598	-	29–12	20–21	10–6
Philadelphia 76ers	38	44	.463	11	23–18	15–26	10–6
Boston Celtics	33	49	.402	16	21–20	12–29	10–6
Toronto Raptors	27	55	.329	22	15–26	12–29	6–10
New York Knicks	23	59	.280	26	15–26	8–33	4–12

Eastern Conference
#	Team	W	L	PCT	GB
1	z-Detroit Pistons	64	18	.780	-
2	y-Miami Heat	52	30	.634	12
3	y-New Jersey Nets	49	33	.598	15
4	x-Cleveland Cavaliers	50	32	.610	14
5	x-Washington Wizards	42	40	.512	22
6	x-Indiana Pacers	41	41	.500	23
7	x-Chicago Bulls	41	41	.500	23
8	x-Milwaukee Bucks	40	42	.488	24
9	Philadelphia 76ers	38	44	.463	26
10	Orlando Magic	36	46	.439	28
11	Boston Celtics	33	49	.402	31
12	Toronto Raptors	27	55	.329	37
13	Charlotte Bobcats	26	56	.317	38
14	Atlanta Hawks	26	56	.317	38
15	New York Knicks	23	59	.280	41

== Player statistics ==
Legend
GP	Games played	GS	Games started	MPG	Minutes per game
FG%	Field-goal percentage	3P%	3-point field-goal percentage	FT%	Free-throw percentage
RPG	Rebounds per game	APG	Assists per game	SPG	Steals per game
BPG	Blocks per game	PPG	Points per game

=== Regular season ===
Player	GP	GS	MPG	FG%	3P%	FT%	RPG	APG	SPG	BPG	PPG
Matt Barnes	50	0	10.8	.536	.182	.674	1.9	.4	.32	.14	3.0
Michael Bradley	46	1	8.0	.405	.200	.667	2.3	.4	.11	.15	1.5
Samuel Dalembert	66	52	26.7	.531	.000	.705	8.2	.4	.52	2.42	7.3
Willie Green	10	2	15.3	.424	.526	.800	1.5	0.5	.20	.00	7.0
Steven Hunter	69	35	19.0	.601	.000	.514	3.9	.2	0.17	1.10	6.1
Andre Iguodala	82	82	37.6	.500	.354	.754	5.9	3.1	1.65	.26	12.3
Allen Iverson	72	72	43.1	.447	.323	.814	3.2	7.4	1.94	.14	33.0
Kyle Korver	82	43	31.3	.430	.420	.849	3.3	2.0	.79	.32	11.5
Lee Nailon	22	0	10.8	.500	.000	.867	1.9	.3	.36	.18	4.2
Kevin Ollie	70	23	15.3	.431	.333	.837	1.4	1.4	.47	.04	2.7
Shavlik Randolph	57	1	8.5	.454	.000	.606	2.3	.3	.33	.21	2.3
John Salmons	82	24	25.1	.420	.299	.775	2.7	2.7	.89	.16	7.5
Chris Webber	75	75	38.6	.434	.273	.756	9.9	3.4	1.37	.83	20.2
Louis Williams	30	0	4.8	.442	.222	.615	.6	.3	.17	.00	1.9

== Awards and records ==
- Allen Iverson, All-NBA Third Team

== See also ==
- 2005-06 NBA season
