= 2005–06 Atlanta Hawks season =

NBA professional basketball team season

- Head coach: Mike Woodson
- Owners: Atlanta Spirit LLC
- Arena: Philips Arena

Results
- Record: 26–56 (.317)
- Place: Division: 5th (Southeast); Conference: 14th (Eastern)
- Playoff finish: did not qualify

Local media
- Television: WUPA; FSN South; Turner South
- Radio: WGST

The 2005–06 Atlanta Hawks season was the 57th season for the Atlanta Hawks in the National Basketball Association, and their 38th season in Atlanta, Georgia.

== Season summary ==
=== Off-season ===
After finishing the previous season with a dreadful 13–69 record, the Hawks received the second overall pick in the 2005 NBA draft, and selected small forward Marvin Williams from the University of North Carolina; the team also selected shooting guard Salim Stoudamire from the University of Arizona with the 31st overall pick. During the off-season, the Hawks acquired Joe Johnson from the Phoenix Suns, and signed free agent Zaza Pachulia. However, tragedy struck as center Jason Collier suffered a heart attack during the preseason and died suddenly on October 15, 2005, at the age of 28.

=== Regular season ===
Despite the addition of Johnson, Pachulia, Williams and Stoudamire, the Hawks continued to struggle by losing their first nine games of the regular season, which was the same start as the Toronto Raptors. The team posted a seven-game losing streak between November and December, which led to a dreadful 2–16 start to the season. However, the Hawks won four of their next five games afterwards, and later on held a 16–34 record at the All-Star break. At mid-season, Tony Delk was released to free agency after one game, and later on signed as a free agent with the 2-time defending Eastern Conference champion Detroit Pistons. The Hawks played .500 in winning percentage with a 6–6 record in February, and finished in last place in the Southeast Division with a 26–56 record, which was tied with the second-year Charlotte Bobcats. The team doubled their win total by posting a 13-game improvement over the previous season, but failed to qualify for the NBA playoffs for the seventh consecutive year.

Johnson averaged 20.2 points, 6.5 assists and 1.3 steals per game, and led the Hawks with 128 three-point field-goals, while Al Harrington averaged 18.6 points and 6.9 rebounds per game, and Pachulia provided the team with 11.7 points and 7.9 rebounds per game. In addition, second-year forward Josh Smith provided with 11.3 points, 6.6 rebounds and 2.6 blocks per game, while Tyronn Lue contributed 11.0 points and 3.1 assists per game, but only played 51 games due to injury, and second-year forward Josh Childress played a sixth man role off the bench, averaging 10.0 points and 5.2 rebounds per game, and shooting .552 in field-goal percentage. Meanwhile, Stoudamire contributed 9.7 points per game, Williams provided with 8.5 points and 4.8 rebounds per game, and was named to the NBA All-Rookie Second Team, and second-year guard Royal Ivey became the team's starting point guard, averaging 3.6 points per game in limited playing time.

During the NBA All-Star weekend at the Toyota Center in Houston, Texas, Smith participated in the NBA Slam Dunk Contest for the second consecutive year. Pachulia finished tied in 21st place in Most Improved Player voting, while Smith finished tied in 23rd place. The Hawks finished 29th in the NBA in home-game attendance, with an attendance of 617,817 at the Philips Arena during the regular season, which was the second-lowest in the league.

=== Notable highlights ===
On December 10, 2005, the Hawks defeated the defending NBA champion San Antonio Spurs at home, 94–84 at the Philips Arena. Two months later on February 7, 2006, the Hawks defeated the Pistons by a score of 99–98 at the Philips Arena; Johnson led the team with 29 points.

=== Aftermath ===
Following the season, Harrington was traded back to his former team, the Indiana Pacers, after two seasons with the Hawks; he would later on be traded again during the following season, this time to the Golden State Warriors.

== Offseason ==
=== Draft picks ===
Round	Pick	Player	Position	Nationality	College / Club
1	2	Marvin Williams	SF/PF	United States	North Carolina
2	31	Salim Stoudamire	SG/PG	United States	Arizona
2	59	Cenk Akyol	SG/SF	Turkey	Efes Pilsen

== Roster ==
Atlanta Hawks roster
Players

Pos.	No.	Player	Height	Weight	DOB	From
PF	11	Esteban Batista	6 ft 10 in (2.08 m)	270 lb (122 kg)		Uruguay
SF	1	Josh Childress	6 ft 8 in (2.03 m)	210 lb (95 kg)		Stanford
C	54	John Edwards	7 ft 0 in (2.13 m)	275 lb (125 kg)		Kent State
SG	16	Anthony Grundy	6 ft 3 in (1.91 m)	185 lb (84 kg)		NC State
PF	3	Al Harrington	6 ft 9 in (2.06 m)	245 lb (111 kg)		St. Patrick (HS)
PG	36	Royal Ivey	6 ft 4 in (1.93 m)	215 lb (98 kg)		Texas
SG	2	Joe Johnson	6 ft 7 in (2.01 m)	240 lb (109 kg)		Arkansas
PG	10	Tyronn Lue	6 ft 0 in (1.83 m)	175 lb (79 kg)		Nebraska
C	27	Zaza Pachulia	6 ft 11 in (2.11 m)	275 lb (125 kg)		Republic of Georgia
SG	15	Donta Smith	6 ft 7 in (2.01 m)	215 lb (98 kg)		Southeastern Illinois
SF	5	Josh Smith	6 ft 9 in (2.06 m)	225 lb (102 kg)		Oak Hill Academy (HS)
SG	20	Salim Stoudamire	6 ft 1 in (1.85 m)	190 lb (86 kg)		Arizona
SF	24	Marvin Williams	6 ft 9 in (2.06 m)	237 lb (108 kg)		North Carolina

Coaches
Head coach
- Mike Woodson (Indiana)
Assistant(s)
- Greg Ballard (Oregon)
- Bob Bender (Duke)
- Herb Brown (Vermont)
- Larry Drew (Missouri)
- David Fizdale (San Diego)

Legend
- (DP) Unsigned draft pick
- (FA) Free agent
- (S) Suspended
- Injured

Roster

=== Roster notes ===
- Center Jason Collier died on October 15, 2005.

== Regular season ==
=== Season standings ===
Southeast Division	W	L	PCT	GB	Home	Road	Div
y-Miami Heat	52	30	.634	-	31–10	21–20	13–3
x-Washington Wizards	42	40	.512	10	27–14	15–26	8–8
Orlando Magic	36	46	.439	16	26–15	10–31	9–7
Charlotte Bobcats	26	56	.317	26	17–24	9–32	5–11
Atlanta Hawks	26	56	.317	26	18–23	8–33	5–11

Eastern Conference
#	Team	W	L	PCT	GB
1	z-Detroit Pistons	64	18	.780	-
2	y-Miami Heat	52	30	.634	12
3	y-New Jersey Nets	49	33	.598	15
4	x-Cleveland Cavaliers	50	32	.610	14
5	x-Washington Wizards	42	40	.512	22
6	x-Indiana Pacers	41	41	.500	23
7	x-Chicago Bulls	41	41	.500	23
8	x-Milwaukee Bucks	40	42	.488	24
9	Philadelphia 76ers	38	44	.463	26
10	Orlando Magic	36	46	.439	28
11	Boston Celtics	33	49	.402	31
12	Toronto Raptors	27	55	.329	37
13	Charlotte Bobcats	26	56	.317	38
14	Atlanta Hawks	26	56	.317	38
15	New York Knicks	23	59	.280	41

z - clinched division title
y - clinched division title
x - clinched playoff spot

== Player statistics ==
Legend
GP	Games played	GS	Games started	MPG	Minutes per game
FG%	Field-goal percentage	3P%	3-point field-goal percentage	FT%	Free-throw percentage
RPG	Rebounds per game	APG	Assists per game	SPG	Steals per game
BPG	Blocks per game	PPG	Points per game

=== Season ===
Player	GP	GS	MPG	FG%	3P%	FT%	RPG	APG	SPG	BPG	PPG
Joe Johnson	82	82	40.7	45.3	35.6	79.1	4.1	6.5	1.3	0.4	20.2
Al Harrington	76	76	36.6	45.2	34.6	69.4	6.9	3.1	1.1	0.2	18.6
Zaza Pachulia	78	78	31.4	45.1	0.0	73.5	7.9	1.7	1.1	0.5	11.7
Josh Smith	80	73	32.0	42.5	30.9	71.9	6.6	2.4	0.8	2.6	11.3
Tyronn Lue	51	10	24.2	45.9	45.7	85.5	1.6	3.1	0.5	0.1	11.0
Josh Childress	74	10	30.4	55.2	49.2	76.6	5.2	1.8	1.2	0.5	10.0
Salim Stoudamire	61	1	20.3	41.5	38.0	90.0	1.9	1.2	0.4	0.0	9.7
Marvin Williams	79	7	24.7	44.3	24.5	74.7	4.8	0.8	0.6	0.3	8.5
Anthony Grundy	12	0	9.0	50.0	33.3	64.3	1.4	0.8	0.6	0.0	4.3
Royal Ivey	73	66	13.4	43.9	40.0	72.7	1.3	1.0	0.3	0.1	3.6
Tony Delk	1	0	7.0	0.0	0.0	100.0	2.0	0.0	0.0	0.0	2.0
Esteban Batista	57	3	8.7	42.5	0.0	62.3	2.5	0.1	0.3	0.2	1.8
John Edwards	40	4	7.4	48.4	0.0	72.7	1.2	0.1	0.1	0.4	1.8
Donta Smith	23	0	5.5	55.6	50.0	50.0	0.6	0.4	0.3	0.0	1.7
John Thomas	11	0	6.0	42.9	0.0	75.0	0.9	0.1	0.2	0.0	0.8

Player statistics citation:

== Awards and records ==
- Marvin Williams, NBA All-Rookie Team 2nd Team

== See also ==
- 2005-06 NBA season
