= 2005–06 New Jersey Nets season =

NBA professional basketball team season

- Division champions
- Head coach: Lawrence Frank
- Arena: Continental Airlines Arena

Results
- Record: 49–33 (.598)
- Place: Division: 1st (Atlantic); Conference: 3rd (Eastern)
- Playoff finish: Conference semifinals (lost to Heat 1–4)
- Stats at Basketball Reference

Local media
- Television: WWOR-TV; YES Network
- Radio: WFAN

The 2005–06 New Jersey Nets season was the team's 39th season in the NBA. Without Brian Scalabrine, who was signed as a free agent with the Boston Celtics in the offseason, they began the season hoping to improve upon their 42-40 output from the previous season. They bested it by seven wins, finishing 49-33 and qualifying for the playoffs for the fifth consecutive season. The Nets lost in the second round to the eventual champions, the Miami Heat.

== Roster ==
2005–06 New Jersey Nets roster
Players

Pos.	No.	Player	Height	Weight	DOB	From
SG	15	Vince Carter	6 ft 6 in (1.98 m)	220 lb (100 kg)	1977-01-26	North Carolina
C	35	Jason Collins	7 ft 0 in (2.13 m)	255 lb (116 kg)	1978-12-02	Stanford
SF	24	Richard Jefferson	6 ft 7 in (2.01 m)	222 lb (101 kg)	1980-06-21	Arizona
PG	5	Jason Kidd	6 ft 4 in (1.93 m)	204 lb (93 kg)	1973-03-23	California
PF	12	Nenad Krstić	7 ft 0 in (2.13 m)	267 lb (121 kg)	1983-07-25	Serbia
SG	0	Jeff McInnis	6 ft 4 in (1.93 m)	179 lb (81 kg)	1974-10-22	North Carolina
SF	31	Lamond Murray	6 ft 7 in (2.01 m)	236 lb (107 kg)	1973-04-20	California
SF	7	Boštjan Nachbar	6 ft 9 in (2.06 m)	221 lb (100 kg)	1980-07-03	Slovenia
PF	34	Scott Padgett	6 ft 9 in (2.06 m)	240 lb (109 kg)	1976-04-19	Kentucky
PG	10	Zoran Planinić	6 ft 6 in (1.98 m)	210 lb (95 kg)	1982-09-12	Croatia
PF	30	Clifford Robinson	6 ft 10 in (2.08 m)	225 lb (102 kg)	1966-12-16	Connecticut
C	41	John Thomas	6 ft 9 in (2.06 m)	265 lb (120 kg)	1975-09-08	Minnesota
SG	11	Jacque Vaughn	6 ft 1 in (1.85 m)	190 lb (86 kg)	1975-02-11	Kansas
SG	21	Antoine Wright	6 ft 7 in (2.01 m)	215 lb (98 kg)	1984-02-06	Texas A&M
PG	2	Derrick Zimmerman	6 ft 3 in (1.91 m)	195 lb (88 kg)	1981-12-02	Mississippi State

Coaches
Head coach
- Lawrence Frank
Assistant(s)
- Tom Barrise
- Bill Cartwright
- Pat Sullivan

Legend
- (DP) Unsigned draft pick
- (FA) Free agent
- (S) Suspended
- Injured

Roster

== Regular season ==
=== Season standings ===
Atlantic Division	W	L	PCT	GB	Home	Road	Div
y-New Jersey Nets	49	33	.598	-	29–12	20–21	10–6
Philadelphia 76ers	38	44	.463	11	23–18	15–26	10–6
Boston Celtics	33	49	.402	16	21–20	12–29	10–6
Toronto Raptors	27	55	.329	22	15–26	12–29	6–10
New York Knicks	23	59	.280	26	15–26	8–33	4–12

Eastern Conference
#	Team	W	L	PCT	GB
1	z-Detroit Pistons	64	18	.780	-
2	y-Miami Heat	52	30	.634	12
3	y-New Jersey Nets	49	33	.598	15
4	x-Cleveland Cavaliers	50	32	.610	14
5	x-Washington Wizards	42	40	.512	22
6	x-Indiana Pacers	41	41	.500	23
7	x-Chicago Bulls	41	41	.500	23
8	x-Milwaukee Bucks	40	42	.488	24
9	Philadelphia 76ers	38	44	.463	26
10	Orlando Magic	36	46	.439	28
11	Boston Celtics	33	49	.402	31
12	Toronto Raptors	27	55	.329	37
13	Charlotte Bobcats	26	56	.317	38
14	Atlanta Hawks	26	56	.317	38
15	New York Knicks	23	59	.280	41

== Playoffs ==
2006 playoff game log
First Round: 4–2 (home: 2–1; road: 2–1)

Game	Date	Team	Score	High points	High rebounds	High assists	Location Attendance	Series
1	April 23	Indiana	L 88–90	Vince Carter (31)	Vince Carter (13)	Jason Kidd (8)	Continental Airlines Arena; 18,752	0–1
2	April 25	Indiana	W 90–75	Vince Carter (33)	Jason Kidd (11)	Jason Kidd (13)	Continental Airlines Arena; 18,472	1–1
3	April 27	@ Indiana	L 95–107	Carter, Jefferson (25)	Collins, Kidd (6)	Richard Jefferson (7)	Conseco Fieldhouse; 14,706	1–2
4	April 29	@ Indiana	W 97–88	Vince Carter (28)	Nenad Krstić (8)	Jason Kidd (8)	Conseco Fieldhouse; 16,401	2–2
5	May 2	Indiana	W 92–86	Vince Carter (34)	Vince Carter (15)	Jason Kidd (15)	Continental Airlines Arena; 18,804	3–2
6	May 4	@ Indiana	W 96–90	Richard Jefferson (30)	Jason Kidd (12)	Jason Kidd (11)	Conseco Fieldhouse; 16,586	4–2

Conference Semifinals: 1–4 (home: 0–2; road: 1–2)

Game	Date	Team	Score	High points	High rebounds	High assists	Location Attendance	Series
1	May 8	@ Miami	W 100–88	Vince Carter (27)	Jason Kidd (9)	Jason Kidd (7)	American Airlines Arena; 20,208	1–0
2	May 10	@ Miami	L 89–111	Vince Carter (22)	Nenad Krstić (7)	Jason Kidd (6)	American Airlines Arena; 20,227	1–1
3	May 12	Miami	L 92–103	Vince Carter (43)	Jason Collins (11)	Jason Kidd (12)	Continental Airlines Arena; 20,102	1–2
4	May 14	Miami	L 92–102	Vince Carter (26)	Nenad Krstić (14)	Jason Kidd (12)	Continental Airlines Arena; 19,474	1–3
5	May 16	@ Miami	L 105–106	Carter, Jefferson (33)	three players tied (7)	Jason Kidd (8)	American Airlines Arena; 20,255	1–4

2006 schedule

== Player statistics ==
Legend
GP	Games played	GS	Games started	MPG	Minutes per game
FG%	Field-goal percentage	3P%	3-point field-goal percentage	FT%	Free-throw percentage
RPG	Rebounds per game	APG	Assists per game	SPG	Steals per game
BPG	Blocks per game	PPG	Points per game

=== Regular season ===
New Jersey Nets statistics
Player	GP	GS	MPG	FG%	3P%	FT%	RPG	APG	SPG	BPG	PPG
Vince Carter	79	79	36.8	.430	.341	.799	5.8	4.3	1.2	0.7	24.2
Richard Jefferson	78	78	39.2	.493	.319	.812	6.8	3.8	0.8	0.2	19.5
Nenad Krstic	80	80	30.9	.507	.250	.698	6.4	1.1	0.4	0.8	13.5
Jason Kidd	80	80	37.2	.404	.352	.795	7.3	8.4	1.9	0.4	13.3
Clifford Robinson	80	13	23.3	.427	.343	.658	3.3	1.1	0.6	0.5	6.9
Jeff McInnis	28	1	17.4	.441	.188	.690	1.8	1.9	0.4	0.1	5.3
Marc Jackson	37	0	11.7	.446		.792	2.4	0.6	0.1	0.2	4.6
Jason Collins	71	70	26.7	.397	.250	.512	4.8	1.0	0.6	0.6	3.6
Jacque Vaughn	80	6	15.4	.437	.167	.728	1.1	1.5	0.5	0.0	3.4
Scott Padgett	62	1	11.6	.353	.347	.794	2.7	0.7	0.5	0.2	3.4
Zoran Planinic	56	1	10.6	.361	.232	.697	1.3	0.9	0.4	0.1	3.4
Lamond Murray	57	1	10.1	.398	.346	.625	2.3	0.2	0.3	0.1	3.4
Bostjan Nachbar	11	0	8.8	.375	.143	.625	1.0	0.5	0.3	0.0	2.8
Derrick Zimmerman	2	0	16.0	.667			2.0	3.5	0.0	0.0	2.0
Antoine Wright	39	0	9.5	.358	.067	.500	0.8	0.3	0.1	0.1	1.8
Linton Johnson	9	0	3.9	.500		.250	0.8	0.2	0.2	0.0	1.2
John Thomas	2	0	18.0	.167			5.0	0.0	0.5	0.5	1.0

=== Playoffs ===
New Jersey Nets statistics
Player	GP	GS	MPG	FG%	3P%	FT%	RPG	APG	SPG	BPG	PPG
Vince Carter	11	11	40.9	.463	.241	.796	7.0	5.3	1.8	0.5	29.6
Richard Jefferson	11	11	39.7	.545	.414	.825	4.1	4.1	0.9	0.4	22.2
Nenad Krstic	11	11	33.3	.504		.711	6.8	0.7	0.5	0.9	14.7
Jason Kidd	11	11	40.9	.371	.300	.826	7.6	9.6	1.5	0.2	12.0
Lamond Murray	11	0	17.9	.389	.353	.818	3.5	0.2	0.3	0.0	5.7
Clifford Robinson	8	0	24.8	.333	.316	.800	3.3	0.6	1.1	0.4	4.5
Jason Collins	11	11	27.5	.360		.591	5.0	0.3	0.5	0.2	2.8
Jacque Vaughn	11	0	14.5	.364	.000	.571	1.0	1.1	0.2	0.0	2.5
Scott Padgett	3	0	3.0	.500	.000	.500	1.0	0.0	0.3	0.0	1.0
John Thomas	8	0	7.0	.500		.500	1.3	0.3	0.4	0.1	0.9
Antoine Wright	5	0	2.0	.250		.667	0.0	0.0	0.0	0.0	0.8
Zoran Planinic	3	0	2.0	.000		.000	0.3	0.7	0.3	0.0	0.0
Bostjan Nachbar	1	0	1.0				0.0	0.0	0.0	0.0	0.0

Player statistics citation:

== Transactions ==
=== Trades ===
August 9, 2005	To New Jersey Nets Marc Jackson To Philadelphia 76ers 2006 second-round pick	February 23, 2006	To New Jersey Nets Boštjan Nachbar To New Orleans Hornets Marc Jackson; Linton Johnson

=== Free agents ===
Additions
Player	Date signed	Former team
Jeff McInnis	August 11	Cleveland Cavaliers
Linton Johnson	September 1	San Antonio Spurs
Lamond Murray	September 8	Toronto Raptors
Scott Padgett	September 8	Houston Rockets
Derrick Zimmerman	October 4	Austin Toros (D-League)
John Thomas	April 18	Atlanta Hawks

Subtractions
Player	Date signed	New Team
Brian Scalabrine	August 2	Boston Celtics
Ron Mercer	August 15	
Billy Thomas	October 27	Washington Wizards
Scott Padgett	June 30	
