= 2005–06 Chicago Bulls season =

NBA professional basketball team season

- Head coach: Scott Skiles
- General manager: John Paxson
- Owners: Jerry Reinsdorf
- Arena: United Center

Results
- Record: 41–41 (.500)
- Place: Division: 4th (Central); Conference: 7th (Eastern)
- Playoff finish: First Round (lost to Heat 2–4)
- Stats at Basketball Reference

Local media
- Television: WGN-TV; WCIU-TV; CSN Chicago
- Radio: WMVP

The 2005–06 Chicago Bulls season was one of mixed results. While the Bulls reached the playoffs for a second straight season, they posted a record of just 41–41 (.500) in the regular season, 6 wins fewer than they had recorded in the previous year even though the roster was mostly the same.

In the playoffs, the Bulls lost to the eventual NBA champion, the Miami Heat, in six games in the First Round.

On December 9, 2005, the Bulls' retired Scottie Pippen's jersey number 33 to the rafters during the halftime ceremony. Pippen was also reunited with his former teammates Michael Jordan, Horace Grant, Dennis Rodman, Craig Hodges, Randy Brown, Toni Kukoc, his former assistant coach Johnny Bach, and former Bulls head coach Phil Jackson during the ceremony.

== Offseason ==
The Bulls did not have any picks in the 2005 draft. The core of the team remained based around Ben Gordon, Luol Deng, and Kirk Hinrich, all draft picks from the previous two years. The Bulls did not sign any household name players through free agency, but did add Malik Allen, Darius Songaila and Michael Sweetney (through the trade explained below), all of which would split time between the starting lineup and the bench. They also added Tim Thomas; however due to a clash with Scott Skiles he appeared in just 3 games for the Bulls and would eventually move to the Phoenix Suns. The Bulls also traded their once first-round draft pick Eddy Curry to the Knicks after Curry missed some of the 2004–05 season with a heart condition. The move was met with some controversy, although it ended up resulting in high draft picks for the Bulls due to the Knicks' poor records in the coming seasons.

== NBA draft ==
The Bulls did not have any draft picks in 2005.

== Roster ==
2005–06 Chicago Bulls roster
Players

Pos.	No.	Player	Height	Weight	DOB	From
F	35	Malik Allen	6 ft 10 in (2.08 m)	255 lb (116 kg)	1978-06-27	Villanova
G/F	13	Eddie Basden	6 ft 5 in (1.96 m)	215 lb (98 kg)	1983-02-15	Charlotte
C	3	Tyson Chandler	7 ft 1 in (2.16 m)	235 lb (107 kg)	1982-10-02	Dominguez HS (CA)
F	9	Luol Deng	6 ft 8 in (2.03 m)	220 lb (100 kg)	1985-04-16	Duke
G	21	Chris Duhon	6 ft 1 in (1.85 m)	185 lb (84 kg)	1982-08-31	Duke
G	7	Ben Gordon	6 ft 3 in (1.91 m)	200 lb (91 kg)	1983-04-04	Connecticut
F/C	24	Othella Harrington	6 ft 9 in (2.06 m)	235 lb (107 kg)	1974-01-31	Georgetown
G	12	Kirk Hinrich	6 ft 3 in (1.91 m)	190 lb (86 kg)	1981-01-02	Kansas
G	1	Randy Livingston	6 ft 4 in (1.93 m)	209 lb (95 kg)	1975-04-02	LSU
F	5	Andres Nocioni	6 ft 7 in (2.01 m)	225 lb (102 kg)	1979-11-30	Argentina
G	15	Jannero Pargo	6 ft 1 in (1.85 m)	175 lb (79 kg)	1979-10-22	Arkansas
G	52	Eric Piatkowski	6 ft 7 in (2.01 m)	215 lb (98 kg)	1970-09-30	Nebraska
C	45	Luke Schenscher	7 ft 1 in (2.16 m)	255 lb (116 kg)	1982-12-31	Georgia Tech
F	25	Darius Songaila	6 ft 9 in (2.06 m)	248 lb (112 kg)	1978-02-14	Wake Forest
F/C	50	Michael Sweetney	6 ft 8 in (2.03 m)	275 lb (125 kg)	1982-10-25	Georgetown

Coaches
Head coach
- Scott Skiles
Assistant(s)
- Ron Adams
- Jim Boylan
- Pete Myers
- Mike Wilhelm
- Fred Tedeschi (trainer)

Legend
- (DP) Unsigned draft pick
- (FA) Free agent
- (S) Suspended
- Injured

Roster
Updated: March 22, 2006

== Regular season ==
=== Standings ===
Central Division	W	L	PCT	GB	Home	Road	Div
y-Detroit Pistons	64	18	.780	-	37–4	27–14	13–3
x-Cleveland Cavaliers	50	32	.610	14	31–10	19–22	11–5
x-Indiana Pacers	41	41	.500	23	27–14	14–27	6–10
x-Chicago Bulls	41	41	.500	23	21–20	20–21	4–12
x-Milwaukee Bucks	40	42	.488	24	25–16	15–26	6–10

Eastern Conference
#	Team	W	L	PCT	GB
1	z-Detroit Pistons	64	18	.780	-
2	y-Miami Heat	52	30	.634	12
3	y-New Jersey Nets	49	33	.598	15
4	x-Cleveland Cavaliers	50	32	.610	14
5	x-Washington Wizards	42	40	.512	22
6	x-Indiana Pacers	41	41	.500	23
7	x-Chicago Bulls	41	41	.500	23
8	x-Milwaukee Bucks	40	42	.488	24
9	Philadelphia 76ers	38	44	.463	26
10	Orlando Magic	36	46	.439	28
11	Boston Celtics	33	49	.402	31
12	Toronto Raptors	27	55	.329	37
13	Charlotte Bobcats	26	56	.317	38
14	Atlanta Hawks	26	56	.317	38
15	New York Knicks	23	59	.280	41

== Playoffs ==
At 41–41 (.500) record, the Bulls managed to sneak into the Eastern Conference Playoffs as a 7th seed. They would lose in the first round to the eventual NBA Champion Miami Heat, although they did manage to stretch the best of 7 series to 6 games, ending a season in which they played very inconsistently on a somewhat positive note. A year later, the Bulls would defeat the Heat in a sweep in the first round.

2006 playoff game log
First Round: 2–4 (home: 2–1; road: 0–3)

Game	Date	Team	Score	High points	High rebounds	High assists	Location Attendance	Series
1	April 22	@ Miami	L 106–111	Ben Gordon (35)	Andrés Nocioni (16)	Kirk Hinrich (8)	American Airlines Arena; 20,288	0–1
2	April 24	@ Miami	L 108–115	Andrés Nocioni (30)	Tyson Chandler (9)	Kirk Hinrich (7)	American Airlines Arena; 20,214	0–2
3	April 27	Miami	W 109–90	Ben Gordon (24)	Andrés Nocioni (9)	Kirk Hinrich (11)	United Center; 22,133	1–2
4	April 30	Miami	W 93–87	Andrés Nocioni (24)	Andrés Nocioni (7)	Kirk Hinrich (9)	United Center; 22,361	2–2
5	May 2	@ Miami	L 78–92	Andrés Nocioni (23)	Andrés Nocioni (10)	Kirk Hinrich (5)	American Airlines Arena; 20,287	2–3
6	May 4	Miami	L 96–113	Kirk Hinrich (23)	Luol Deng (6)	Kirk Hinrich (6)	United Center; 22,584	2–4

2006 schedule

== Player statistics ==
Legend
GP	Games played	GS	Games started	MPG	Minutes per game
FG%	Field-goal percentage	3P%	3-point field-goal percentage	FT%	Free-throw percentage
RPG	Rebounds per game	APG	Assists per game	SPG	Steals per game
BPG	Blocks per game	PPG	Points per game

=== Regular season ===
Player	GP	GS	MPG	FG%	3P%	FT%	RPG	APG	SPG	BPG	PPG
Andrés Nocioni	82	43	27.3	.461	.391	.843	6.1	1.4	.5	.6	13.0
Kirk Hinrich	81	81	36.5	.418	.370	.815	3.6	6.3	1.2	.3	15.9
Ben Gordon	80	47	31.0	.422	.435	.787	2.7	3.0	.9	.1	16.9
Tyson Chandler	79	50	26.8	.565	.000	.503	9.0	1.0	.5	1.3	5.3
Luol Deng	78	56	33.4	.463	.269	.750	6.6	1.9	.9	.6	14.3
Chris Duhon	74	38	29.1	.400	.360	.818	3.0	5.0	.9	.0	8.7
Othella Harrington	72	23	11.4	.495		.626	2.1	.5	.1	.2	4.8
Michael Sweetney	66	44	18.5	.450		.652	5.3	.9	.3	.8	8.1
Darius Songaila	62	7	21.4	.481	.400	.817	4.0	1.4	.6	.3	9.2
Jannero Pargo	57	0	11.3	.373	.379	.810	1.1	1.6	.4	.0	4.8
Malik Allen	54	20	13.0	.490	1.000	.605	2.6	.4	.3	.3	4.9
Eric Piatkowski	29	1	7.9	.393	.273	.400	.8	.4	.2	.0	2.0
Luke Schenscher	20	0	7.5	.615		.308	1.5	.4	.1	.2	1.8
Eddie Basden	19	0	7.4	.405	.143	.800	1.5	.4	.5	.1	2.1
James Thomas^{†}	7	0	3.7	.500			1.1	.0	.0	.0	.9
Randy Livingston	5	0	4.4	.000			.8	.2	.2	.0	.0
Randy Holcomb	4	0	2.8	1.000			.3	.0	.0	.0	.5
Tim Thomas^{†}	3	0	10.7	.375	.167		1.3	.7	.0	.3	4.3
Stephen Graham^{†}	3	0	6.7	.200	.250	1.000	1.0	.3	.0	.0	1.7

=== Playoffs ===
Player	GP	GS	MPG	FG%	3P%	FT%	RPG	APG	SPG	BPG	PPG
Ben Gordon	6	6	40.8	.406	.366	.676	3.3	3.0	1.0	.0	21.0
Kirk Hinrich	6	6	39.0	.415	.346	.857	3.3	7.7	1.3	.3	20.5
Andrés Nocioni	6	6	38.3	.560	.476	.857	8.8	1.5	.8	.3	22.3
Michael Sweetney	6	6	20.0	.412		.789	5.5	1.2	.5	1.0	7.2
Malik Allen	6	6	19.3	.467		.000	3.0	1.2	.3	1.0	4.7
Luol Deng	6	0	30.0	.429	.200	.571	4.8	.5	.8	.7	10.2
Chris Duhon	6	0	21.8	.360	.438	.833	2.7	2.2	.3	.0	5.0
Tyson Chandler	6	0	17.3	.667		.300	4.5	.5	.3	.3	1.8
Eric Piatkowski	6	0	4.7	.500	.400	1.000	.8	.2	.0	.2	1.7
Jannero Pargo	5	0	3.8	.417	.600	.800	1.2	.6	.0	.0	3.4
Luke Schenscher	3	0	5.7	1.000		.750	2.3	.0	.0	.0	2.3
Othella Harrington	3	0	5.0	.000			.7	.0	.3	.0	.0

- ^{†} Denotes player spent time with another team in the season. Stats reflect time with the Bulls only.

== Transactions ==
- August 8, 2005: Signed G Eddie Basden
- August 15, 2005: Resigned G Chris Duhon
- August 26, 2005: Resigned F Othella Harrington
- September 1, 2005: Resigned C Tyson Chandler
- September 2, 2005: Signed F Malik Allen
- September 23, 2005: Signed F Darius Songaila
- October 3, 2005: Resigned G Jannero Pargo
- October 4, 2005: Traded C Eddy Curry and F Antonio Davis to the New York Knicks for F Mike Sweetney, F Tim Thomas, G Jermaine Jackson, a conditional first round draft pick and two second round draft picks
- October 18, 2005: Waived G Jermaine Jackson
- January 5, 2006: Signed F Randy Holcomb to a 10-day contract
- January 17, 2006: Signed G Stephen Graham to a 10-day contract
- January 27, 2006: Signed F James Thomas to a 10-day contract
- March 1, 2006: Waived F Tim Thomas
- March 5, 2006: Signed C Luke Schenscher to a 10-day contract
- March 15, 2006: Signed C Luke Schenscher to a 10-day contract
- March 22, 2006: Signed G Randy Livingston to a 10-day contract
- March 25, 2006: Signed C Luke Schenscher for the season
