= 2006 NBA Finals =

2006 basketball championship series

Team	Coach	Wins
Miami Heat	Pat Riley	4
Dallas Mavericks	Avery Johnson	2
- Dates: June 8–20
- MVP: Dwyane Wade (Miami Heat)
- Hall of Famers: Heat: Alonzo Mourning (2014); Shaquille O'Neal (2016); Gary Payton (2013); Dwyane Wade (2023); Mavericks: Dirk Nowitzki (2023); Coaches: Pat Riley (2008); Officials: Dick Bavetta (2015); Danny Crawford (2025)
- Eastern finals: Heat defeated Pistons, 4–2
- Western finals: Mavericks defeated Suns, 4–2

The 2006 NBA Finals was the championship series of the National Basketball Association's (NBA) 2005–06 season, and the conclusion of the season's playoffs. It featured the Dallas Mavericks of the Western Conference and the Miami Heat of the Eastern Conference. The Heat overcame a two-games-to-none series deficit to defeat the Mavericks in six games, winning their first NBA championship in franchise history.

The Mavericks were heavy favorites to win the championship over the Heat. Despite these odds, the Heat pulled off the upset, becoming the third team—after the 1969 Celtics, the 1977 Trail Blazers and later the 2016 Cleveland Cavaliers and 2021 Milwaukee Bucks—to win a championship after trailing 0–2 in the series. Dwyane Wade of the Heat was named Most Valuable Player of the series.

For the first time since 1971, the series featured two teams that had never previously appeared in the Finals; and it was the first Finals since 1978 where neither team had previously won an NBA title. As of 2026, this is the last NBA Finals between teams that have never previously won a championship before.

This was the second NBA Finals match-up of teams from Florida and Texas, after the Houston Rockets and Orlando Magic contested the 1995 NBA Finals. Until the Heat defeated the San Antonio Spurs in the 2013 NBA Finals, it was the last Finals loss by a team from Texas (Houston lost in 1981 and 1986) versus eight Finals victories (five by San Antonio, two by Houston, and one by Dallas) including the Spurs in 2007 and the Mavericks in 2011. This was the only Finals of the 2000s not to involve the Los Angeles Lakers or the San Antonio Spurs, and the first since 1995 not to feature either Phil Jackson or Gregg Popovich as head coach. It was also the first Finals where the same company (American Airlines) owned the naming rights to both home arenas, namely American Airlines Center in Dallas and American Airlines Arena in Miami; Miami's arena name has since changed to Kaseya Center.

== Background ==
The Miami Heat joined the league in the 1988–89 season, but they did not rise to prominence until they hired Pat Riley to be their head coach and president before the 1995–96 season. In Riley's first stint, the Heat were playoff regulars between 1996 and 2001, however, the Chicago Bulls and New York Knicks always thwarted Miami's dreams of a championship or even a Finals berth. However, when the team drafted Dwyane Wade fifth overall in 2003, things started to look up for the Heat. They went 42-40 under interim coach Stan Van Gundy, making the playoffs after a 2-year hiatus. They defeated the New Orleans Hornets in the first round, but they ultimately fell to the Pacers in 6 games. The 2004 offseason saw the addition of Shaquille O'Neal, and with Wade and O'Neal performing well, the Heat won 59 games in the 2004–05 season, as they took the defending champions Detroit Pistons to seven games in the conference finals. The following season, after an early 11–10 start, Van Gundy resigned and Riley returned to coaching. Though injuries and lack of chemistry hobbled the Heat initially, they still managed to win 52 games that season. After a culmination of harmony and momentum came together just before the playoffs, they started their postseason run by defeating the Bulls in six games, then eliminated the New Jersey Nets in five games, and then ousted the 64-win 4 all-star Pistons in six games to reach the NBA Finals for the first time in franchise history.

=== Path to the Finals ===
Dallas Mavericks (Western Conference champion)		Miami Heat (Eastern Conference champion)
# / Western Conference; # / Team / W / L / PCT / GB; 1 / c-San Antonio Spurs / 63 / 19 / .768 / -; 2 / y-Phoenix Suns / 54 / 28 / .659 / 9; 3 / y-Denver Nuggets / 44 / 38 / .537 / 19; 4 / x-Dallas Mavericks / 60 / 22 / .732 / 3; 5 / x-Memphis Grizzlies / 49 / 33 / .598 / 14; 6 / x-Los Angeles Clippers / 47 / 35 / .573 / 16; 7 / x-Los Angeles Lakers / 45 / 37 / .549 / 18; 8 / x-Sacramento Kings / 44 / 38 / .537 / 19; 9 / Utah Jazz / 41 / 41 / .500 / 22; 10 / New Orleans/Oklahoma City Hornets / 38 / 44 / .463 / 25; 11 / Seattle SuperSonics / 35 / 47 / .427 / 28; 12 / Golden State Warriors / 34 / 48 / .415 / 29; 13 / Houston Rockets / 34 / 48 / .415 / 29; 14 / Minnesota Timberwolves / 33 / 49 / .402 / 30; 15 / Portland Trail Blazers / 21 / 61 / .256 / 42; 4th seed in the West, 3rd best league record	Regular season	Eastern Conference: # / Team / W / L / PCT / GB; 1 / z-Detroit Pistons / 64 / 18 / .780 / -; 2 / y-Miami Heat / 52 / 30 / .634 / 12; 3 / y-New Jersey Nets / 49 / 33 / .598 / 15; 4 / x-Cleveland Cavaliers / 50 / 32 / .610 / 14; 5 / x-Washington Wizards / 42 / 40 / .512 / 22; 6 / x-Indiana Pacers / 41 / 41 / .500 / 23; 7 / x-Chicago Bulls / 41 / 41 / .500 / 23; 8 / x-Milwaukee Bucks / 40 / 42 / .488 / 24; 9 / Philadelphia 76ers / 38 / 44 / .463 / 26; 10 / Orlando Magic / 36 / 46 / .439 / 28; 11 / Boston Celtics / 33 / 49 / .402 / 31; 12 / Toronto Raptors / 27 / 55 / .329 / 37; 13 / Charlotte Bobcats / 26 / 56 / .317 / 38; 14 / Atlanta Hawks / 26 / 56 / .317 / 38; 15 / New York Knicks / 23 / 59 / .280 / 41; 2nd seed in the East, 5th best league record
Defeated the (5) Memphis Grizzlies, 4–0	First round	Defeated the (7) Chicago Bulls, 4–2
Defeated the (1) San Antonio Spurs, 4–3	Conference semifinals	Defeated the (3) New Jersey Nets, 4–1
Defeated the (2) Phoenix Suns, 4–2	Conference finals	Defeated the (1) Detroit Pistons, 4–2

=== Regular-season series ===
The Dallas Mavericks won both games in the regular season series:

November 25, 2005

Dallas Mavericks 103, Miami Heat 90

American Airlines Arena, Miami

February 9, 2006

Miami Heat 76, Dallas Mavericks 112

American Airlines Center, Dallas

== Rosters ==
=== Miami Heat ===
2005–06 Miami Heat roster
Players

Pos.	No.	Player	Height	Weight	DOB	From
SG	5	Derek Anderson	6 ft 5 in (1.96 m)	194 lb (88 kg)	1974–07–18	Kentucky
SF	49	Shandon Anderson	6 ft 6 in (1.98 m)	208 lb (94 kg)	1973–12–31	Georgia
C	30	Earl Barron	7 ft 0 in (2.13 m)	250 lb (113 kg)	1981–08–14	Memphis
C	51	Michael Doleac	6 ft 11 in (2.11 m)	262 lb (119 kg)	1977–06–15	Utah
PF	40	Udonis Haslem	6 ft 8 in (2.03 m)	235 lb (107 kg)	1980–06–09	Florida
SF	24	Jason Kapono	6 ft 8 in (2.03 m)	213 lb (97 kg)	1981–02–04	UCLA
C	33	Alonzo Mourning	6 ft 10 in (2.08 m)	240 lb (109 kg)	1970–02–08	Georgetown
C	32	Shaquille O'Neal	7 ft 1 in (2.16 m)	325 lb (147 kg)	1972–03–06	LSU
PG	20	Gary Payton	6 ft 4 in (1.93 m)	180 lb (82 kg)	1968–07–23	Oregon State
SF	42	James Posey	6 ft 8 in (2.03 m)	215 lb (98 kg)	1977–01–13	Xavier
PF	25	Wayne Simien	6 ft 9 in (2.06 m)	255 lb (116 kg)	1983–03–09	Kansas
SG	3	Dwyane Wade	6 ft 4 in (1.93 m)	220 lb (100 kg)	1982–01–17	Marquette
PF	8	Antoine Walker	6 ft 8 in (2.03 m)	224 lb (102 kg)	1976–08–12	Kentucky
PG	55	Jason Williams	6 ft 1 in (1.85 m)	190 lb (86 kg)	1975–11–18	Florida
SF	1	Dorell Wright	6 ft 7 in (2.01 m)	200 lb (91 kg)	1985–12–02	South Kent School (CT)

Coaches
Head coach
- Pat Riley
Assistant(s)
- Keith Askins
- Bob McAdoo
- Ron Rothstein
- Erik Spoelstra
- Bill Foran

Legend
- (DP) Unsigned draft pick
- (FA) Free agent
- (S) Suspended
- (DL) On assignment to D-League affiliate
- Injured

=== Dallas Mavericks ===
2005–06 Dallas Mavericks roster
Players

Pos.	No.	Player	Height	Weight	DOB	From
PG	10	Darrell Armstrong	6 ft 0 in (1.83 m)	170 lb (77 kg)	1968–06–22	Fayetteville State
C	25	Erick Dampier	6 ft 11 in (2.11 m)	265 lb (120 kg)	1975–07–14	Mississippi State
SG	6	Marquis Daniels	6 ft 6 in (1.98 m)	200 lb (91 kg)	1981–01–07	Auburn
C	7	DeSagana Diop	7 ft 0 in (2.13 m)	300 lb (136 kg)	1982–01–30	Oak Hill Academy (VA)
SG	44	Adrian Griffin	6 ft 5 in (1.96 m)	217 lb (98 kg)	1974–07–04	Seton Hall
PG	34	Devin Harris	6 ft 3 in (1.91 m)	192 lb (87 kg)	1983–02–27	Wisconsin
SF	5	Josh Howard	6 ft 7 in (2.01 m)	210 lb (95 kg)	1980–04–28	Wake Forest
C	28	D. J. Mbenga	7 ft 0 in (2.13 m)	245 lb (111 kg)	1980–12–30	Belgium
PF	41	Dirk Nowitzki	7 ft 0 in (2.13 m)	245 lb (111 kg)	1978–06–19	Germany
C	24	Pavel Podkolzin	7 ft 5 in (2.26 m)	305 lb (138 kg)	1985-01-15	Russia
PF	33	Josh Powell	6 ft 9 in (2.06 m)	225 lb (102 kg)	1983–01–25	NC State
SG	42	Jerry Stackhouse	6 ft 6 in (1.98 m)	218 lb (99 kg)	1974–11–5	North Carolina
PG	31	Jason Terry	6 ft 2 in (1.88 m)	185 lb (84 kg)	1977–09–15	Arizona
SF	2	Keith Van Horn	6 ft 10 in (2.08 m)	220 lb (100 kg)	1975–10–23	Utah

Coaches
Head coach
- Avery Johnson
Assistant(s)
- Rolando Blackman
- Del Harris
- Joe Prunty
- Larry Riley
- Brad Davis

Legend
- (DP) Unsigned draft pick
- (FA) Free agent
- (S) Suspended
- (DL) On assignment to D-League affiliate
- Injured

- Shaquille O'Neal and Gary Payton became the 6th and 7th players to play in the NBA Finals for three different teams. O'Neal played in the 1995 NBA Finals with the Orlando Magic and four times with the Los Angeles Lakers, while Payton played in the 1996 NBA Finals with the Seattle SuperSonics and with O'Neal on the 2004 Lakers team that lost to the Pistons. The other players to play in the Finals for three teams are: Danny Ainge, Sam Perkins, John Salley, Horace Grant, Robert Horry and now LeBron James with the Cavs, Heat and the Lakers as well as Danny Green with the Spurs, Raptors and the same Lakers squad as LeBron.
- Also, O'Neal and Alonzo Mourning achieved the rare feat of being the former first-round picks from the same year (1992) to win a championship with the same team. O'Neal was the first overall draft pick of the Orlando Magic, while Mourning went second to the Charlotte Hornets. Ironically, the third pick in that draft, Christian Laettner (who was selected by the Minnesota Timberwolves), was a member of the previous year's team, his final season before retiring.

== Series summary ==
Game	Date	Road team	Result	Home team
Game 1	June 8	Miami Heat	80–90 (0–1)	Dallas Mavericks
Game 2	June 11	Miami Heat	85–99 (0–2)	Dallas Mavericks
Game 3	June 13	Dallas Mavericks	96–98 (2–1)	Miami Heat
Game 4	June 15	Dallas Mavericks	74–98 (2–2)	Miami Heat
Game 5	June 18	Dallas Mavericks	100–101 (OT) (2–3)	Miami Heat
Game 6	June 20	Miami Heat	95–92 (4–2)	Dallas Mavericks

The Heat became the second team since 1985 to sweep the middle three games at home, the 2004 Detroit Pistons being the first. In 1985 the NBA switched the Finals to the 2-3-2 format, which was changed back to the 2-2-1-1-1 format for the 2014 NBA Finals.

== Game summaries ==
All times are in Eastern Daylight Time (UTC−4). If the venue is located in a different time zone, the local time is also given.

=== Game 1 ===
ABC

June 8
9:00pm (8:00 pm CDT)

1 at the Wayback Machine (archived December 1, 2010)

Miami Heat 80, Dallas Mavericks 90
Scoring by quarter: 31–23, 13–23, 24–24, 12–20
Pts: Dwyane Wade 30; Rebs: Udonis Haslem 8 Asts: Dwyane Wade 7	Pts: Jason Terry 32; Rebs: Josh Howard 12; Asts: Nowitzki, Howard 5 each
Dallas leads series, 1–0

American Airlines Center, Dallas, Texas
Attendance: 20,475
Referees:
- No. 17 Joe Crawford
- No. 14 Joe DeRosa
- No. 15 Bennett Salvatore

Dallas's Jason Terry scored a playoff-high 32 points as the Mavericks overcame a 31–23 deficit at the end of the first quarter.

=== Game 2 ===
ABC

June 11
9:00pm (8:00 pm CDT)

2 at the Wayback Machine (archived December 1, 2010)

Miami Heat 85, Dallas Mavericks 99
Scoring by quarter: 17–18, 17–32, 24–32, 27–17
Pts: Dwyane Wade 21; Rebs: Dwyane Wade 8 Asts: Payton, Williams 5 each	Pts: Dirk Nowitzki 30; Rebs: Dirk Nowitzki 12; Asts: Jason Terry 8
Dallas leads series, 2–0

American Airlines Center, Dallas, Texas
Attendance: 20,459
Referees:
- No. 26 Bob Delaney
- No. 29 Steve Javie
- No. 32 Eddie F. Rush

Dirk Nowitzki had a stellar 30-point and 12-rebound performance, and the Mavericks cruised to a 2–0 series lead.

=== Game 3 ===
ABC

June 13
9:00pm

3 at the Wayback Machine (archived December 1, 2010)

Dallas Mavericks 96, Miami Heat 98
Scoring by quarter: 21–29, 22–23, 34–16, 19–30
Pts: Dirk Nowitzki 30; Rebs: Erick Dampier 9 Asts: Jason Terry 5	Pts: Dwyane Wade 42; Rebs: Dwyane Wade 13; Asts: Shaquille O'Neal 5
Dallas leads series, 2–1

American Airlines Arena, Miami, Florida
Attendance: 20,145
Referees:
- No. 43 Dan Crawford
- No. 41 Ken Mauer
- No. 35 Jack Nies

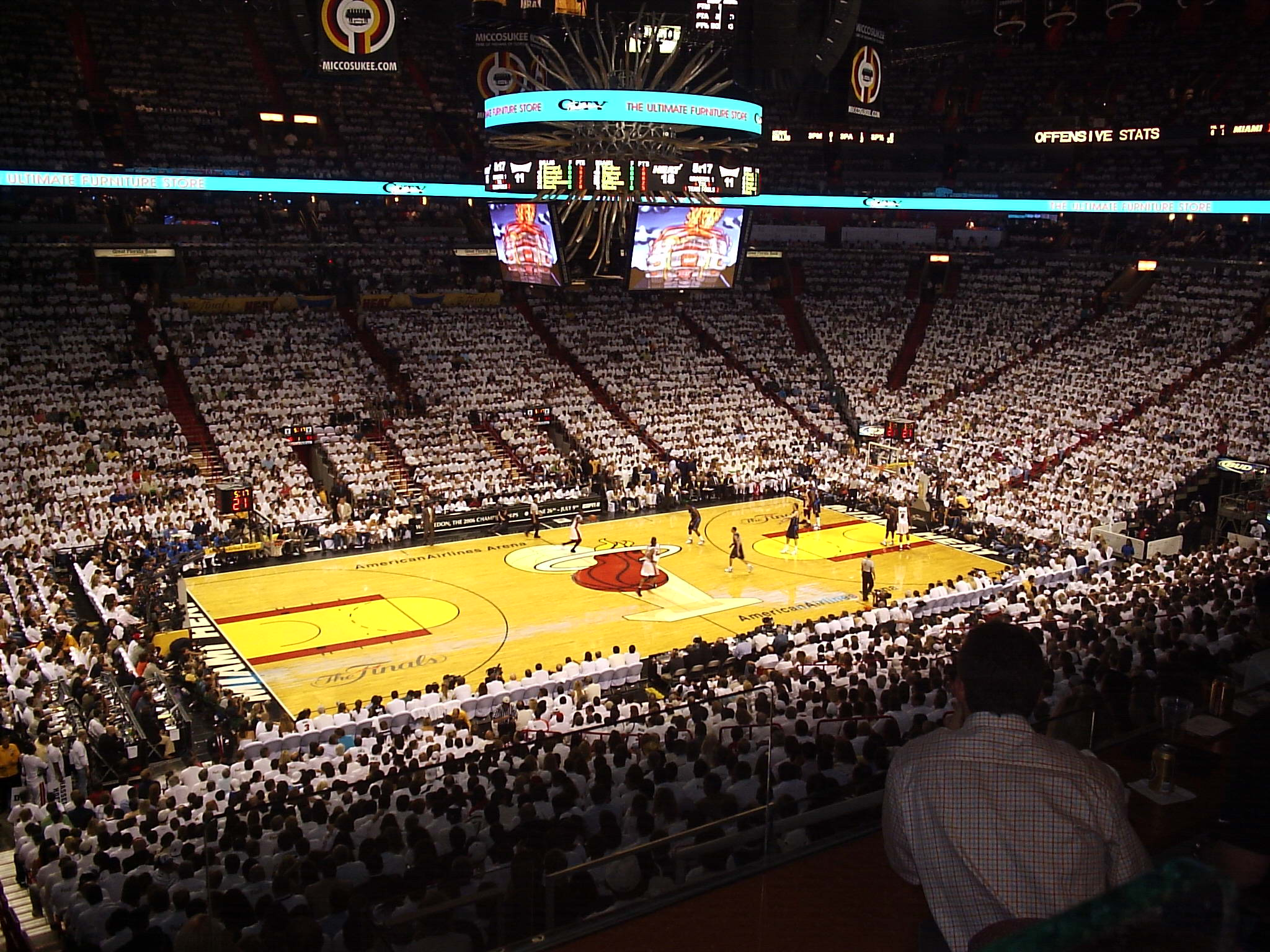
Game 3 of the 2006 NBA Finals

Led by Dwyane Wade's 42 points and 13 rebounds, the Heat rallied from a 13-point deficit with six minutes to go in the fourth quarter. The momentum-changing comeback was capped by a Gary Payton field goal from just inside the three-point line with 9.3 seconds left. Dirk Nowitzki had a chance to tie the game at the free throw line with 3.4 seconds to go, but missed 1 of 2, sealing the win for Miami.

=== Game 4 ===
ABC

June 15
9:00pm

4 at the Wayback Machine (archived December 1, 2010)

Dallas Mavericks 74, Miami Heat 98
Scoring by quarter: 25–30, 19–24, 23–24, 7–20
Pts: Jason Terry 17; Rebs: Dirk Nowitzki 9 Asts: Jerry Stackhouse 4	Pts: Dwyane Wade 36; Rebs: Shaquille O'Neal 13; Asts: Jason Williams 6
Series tied, 2–2

American Airlines Arena, Miami, Florida
Attendance: 20,145
Referees:
- No. 27 Dick Bavetta
- No. 14 Mike Callahan
- No. 7 Bernie Fryer

Dwyane Wade shined again for the Heat with 36 points, and Miami held Dallas to just seven points in the fourth quarter en route to a series-tying, blowout victory. The Mavericks' fourth quarter was the lowest ever by any team during the NBA Finals. Jerry Stackhouse committed a flagrant foul that resulted in his suspension for Game 5. Stackhouse was the final NBA player to be suspended in the NBA Finals until Draymond Green in the 2016 NBA Finals.

=== Game 5 ===
ABC

June 18
9:00pm

"5". NBA.com. Archived from the original on December 1, 2010.

Dallas Mavericks 100, Miami Heat 101 (OT)
Scoring by quarter: 21–24, 30–19, 20–27, 22–23, Overtime: 7–8
Pts: Jason Terry 35; Rebs: Josh Howard 10; Asts: Marquis Daniels 4	Pts: Dwyane Wade 43; Rebs: Shaquille O'Neal 12; Asts: Wade, Williams 4 each
Miami leads series, 3–2

American Airlines Arena, Miami, Florida
Attendance: 20,145
Referees:
- No. 17 Joe Crawford
- No. 14 Joe DeRosa
- No. 15 Bennett Salvatore

Dwyane Wade shot 25 free throws—as many as all the Mavericks combined (a fact that did not sit well with Mavericks head coach Avery Johnson), leading the Heat to their third straight win.

With 9.1 seconds left in overtime and the Heat trailing by 1 point, they inbounded the ball to Wade, who caught the ball in the air and then landed in the backcourt. Mavericks owner Mark Cuban felt Wade had therefore committed a backcourt violation after receiving the ball.

Dallas was then penalized with a controversial foul call that sent Wade to the line to shoot the go-ahead free throws with 1.9 seconds left. Wade hit the first free throw, and Dallas coach Avery Johnson signaled to his team to call a timeout after Wade's second attempt. Josh Howard then made a timeout gesture with his hands and began to walk off the floor, and the referees called the Mavericks' last remaining timeout, which prevented them from advancing the ball after the second attempt if Wade converted. After the timeout, Wade made the second free throw to give his team a one-point lead, after which Devin Harris missed a half-court shot as time expired. Wade finished the game with 43 points while setting an NBA Finals record for most made free throws in a game with 21. Shaquille O'Neal had a double-double with 18 points and 12 rebounds. Miami converted 32 of its 49 attempts from the free-throw line.

Jason Terry led Dallas with 35 points, while Howard added 25. After the game, a frustrated Dirk Nowitzki kicked a ball into the stands and Cuban caused many "acts of misconduct" resulting in fines of $5,000 and $250,000, respectively.

=== Game 6 ===
ABC

June 20
9:00pm (8:00 pm CDT)

"6". NBA.com. Archived from the original on December 1, 2010.

Miami Heat 95, Dallas Mavericks 92
Scoring by quarter: 23–30, 26–18, 22–20, 24–24
Pts: Dwyane Wade 36; Rebs: Shaquille O'Neal 12; Asts: Jason Williams 7	Pts: Dirk Nowitzki 29; Rebs: Dirk Nowitzki 15; Asts: Jason Terry 5
Miami wins NBA Finals, 4–2

American Airlines Center, Dallas, Texas
Attendance: 20,522
Referees:
- No. 43 Dan Crawford
- No. 29 Steve Javie
- No. 32 Eddie F. Rush

Behind Dwyane Wade's 36 points, Miami rallied from a 14-point first-half deficit to win its first championship in franchise history as Jason Terry missed a 3-pointer that would have sent the game to overtime. Averaging 34.7 points per game in the series, Wade was named NBA Finals Most Valuable Player.

== Player statistics ==
Legend
GP	Games played	GS	Games started	MPG	Minutes per game
FG%	Field-goal percentage	3P%	3-point field-goal percentage	FT%	Free-throw percentage
RPG	Rebounds per game	APG	Assists per game	SPG	Steals per game
BPG	Blocks per game	PPG	Points per game

Miami Heat

Miami Heat statistics
Player	GP	GS	MPG	FG%	3P%	FT%	RPG	APG	SPG	BPG	PPG
Shandon Anderson	4	0	7.7	.333	.000	.500	1.8	0.8	0.0	0.0	1.5
Michael Doleac	1	0	1.2	.000	.000	.000	0.0	0.0	0.0	0.0	0.0
Udonis Haslem	6	6	29.2	.500	.000	.300	6.2	0.3	1.2	0.0	6.5
Jason Kapono	1	0	1.5	.000	.000	.000	0.0	0.0	0.0	0.0	0.0
Alonzo Mourning	6	0	11.0	.692	.000	.667	3.2	0.0	0.3	1.5	4.3
Shaquille O'Neal	6	6	35.2	.607	.000	.292	10.2	2.8	0.5	0.8	13.7
Gary Payton	6	0	22.3	.368	.143	.333	2.0	2.0	1.0	0.0	2.7
James Posey	6	0	29.5	.419	.400	.769	6.0	0.3	1.0	0.0	7.3
Dwyane Wade	6	6	43.5	.468	.273	.773	7.8	3.8	2.7	1.0	34.7
Antoine Walker	6	6	36.6	.391	.270	.556	5.5	2.2	0.7	0.5	13.8
Jason Williams	6	6	31.3	.360	.345	.636	1.8	4.7	0.5	0.0	8.8

Dallas Mavericks

Dallas Mavericks statistics
Player	GP	GS	MPG	FG%	3P%	FT%	RPG	APG	SPG	BPG	PPG
Darrell Armstrong	1	0	6.3	.000	.000	.000	1.0	0.0	0.0	0.0	0.0
Erick Dampier	6	0	24.6	.722	.000	.500	8.2	0.3	1.0	0.7	5.7
Marquis Daniels	6	0	8.8	.545	.333	.800	0.5	1.3	0.0	0.0	2.8
DeSagana Diop	6	6	15.7	.500	.000	.500	3.3	0.2	0.3	0.8	1.7
Adrian Griffin	6	3	13.7	.563	.000	.000	3.2	0.8	0.8	0.0	3.0
Devin Harris	6	3	24.5	.364	.000	.750	0.8	2.8	0.8	0.0	7.3
Josh Howard	6	6	38.4	.388	.263	.808	8.2	1.8	1.2	0.7	14.7
D. J. Mbenga	2	0	4.5	.000	.000	.000	1.5	0.0	0.0	0.0	0.0
Dirk Nowitzki	6	6	43.7	.390	.250	.891	10.8	2.5	0.7	0.7	22.8
Josh Powell	1	0	3.6	.000	.000	.000	1.0	0.0	0.0	0.0	0.0
Jerry Stackhouse	5	0	30.0	.355	.368	.929	3.4	3.0	0.8	0.6	12.8
Jason Terry	6	6	40.0	.478	.317	.733	2.2	3.5	1.8	0.0	22.0
Keith Van Horn	5	0	7.8	.273	.167	.0000	1.2	0.0	0.0	0.0	1.4

== Broadcasting ==
ABC had exclusive rights to televise the NBA Finals in the United States. Play-by-play announcer Mike Breen and color commentator Hubie Brown called the action, with courtside reporting by Lisa Salters and Stuart Scott. Radio counterpart ESPN Radio broadcast the Finals, with Jim Durham and Dr. Jack Ramsay calling the action. The featured song, aired throughout the playoffs, was Tom Petty and the Heartbreakers' "Runnin' Down a Dream."

This marked the first of 21 consecutive NBA Finals called by Breen, currently the most among NBA play-by-play voices; the only games he would not call during this period was Games 1 and 2 of the 2022 NBA Finals, when Mark Jones took over due to Breen's quarantine as a result of COVID-19. However, it was the only NBA Finals to feature Breen with Hubie Brown. The following season, Brown slid down to ESPN's secondary team with Mike Tirico (the pair would also call ESPN Radio's NBA Finals broadcasts that season), while Mark Jackson and Jeff Van Gundy (the latter after his dismissal as Houston Rockets head coach) joined Breen on the lead team. With the exception of the 2012 and 2013 Finals (during those seasons, Jackson coached the Golden State Warriors), the Breen–Jackson–Van Gundy team would call every NBA Finals until 2023.

Game 2 of the Finals, which took place the same evening as the 60th Tony Awards, was the most-watched program of June 11, 2006. ABC won the night with 3.5 rating and 10 share, CBS came in fourth with a 1.5/4 for the Tonys. On June 20, Game 6 had a 4.4/13 among viewers aged 18–49. The local ABC affiliates of the participating teams at the time were WPLG in Miami and WFAA in Dallas.

The 2006 NBA Finals was the last to feature the ABC Sports branding, as it changed to ESPN on ABC 3 months later.

The finals were shown on Sky Sports in the United Kingdom and Ireland.

== Aftermath ==
The Mavericks would post the league's best record with 67 victories in the 2006–07 NBA season but were ousted by the eight-seeded Golden State Warriors in a six-game first round of the 2007 NBA playoffs. The Mavs' playoff defeat marked the first time a top seed was eliminated in a seven-game first round series since it was implemented in 2003. Still, Dirk Nowitzki was named the regular season MVP at season's end. After another playoff loss to the New Orleans Hornets in 2008, in which the Mavericks brought back Jason Kidd, head coach Avery Johnson was fired and replaced by Rick Carlisle. After another two early playoff exits, the Mavericks won 57 games in the 2010–11 season and returned to the Finals.

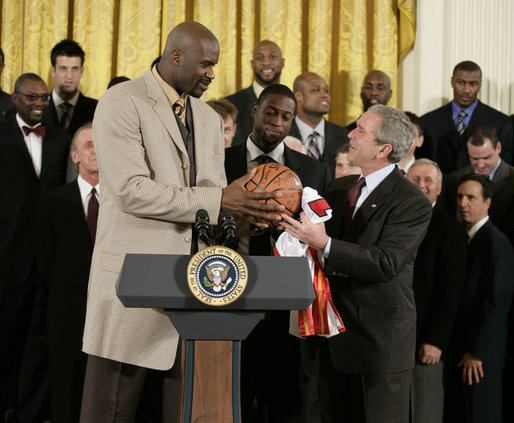
O'Neal gifting President George W. Bush a signed basketball at the Heat White House visit in 2007.

The Heat would lose convincingly by 42 points to the Chicago Bulls in the opening night of the 2006–07 season, the worst opening-day margin of defeat for a defending champion in NBA history. Injuries would keep the team from surpassing or even equaling last season's total, yet they still won the Southeast Division despite winning only 44 games. The Bulls would oust them in a four-game sweep in the first round of the playoffs, the first such occurrence since 1957. The following year, Miami completed its two-year turnaround from NBA champion to the NBA's worst team by winning only 15 games, equaling the mark set by the team in their inaugural season, which saw Shaquille O'Neal traded to the Phoenix Suns in mid-season and Dwyane Wade missing 31 games. The Heat gradually climbed back to contention in the Erik Spoelstra era, culminating in the much-publicized free-agent acquisitions of LeBron James and Chris Bosh. The Heat won 58 games in the 2010–11 season, and along with the Mavericks, returned to the Finals in 2011.

The 2011 NBA Finals, which was a rematch of 2006, saw the Mavericks win in six games after trailing 2–1 in the Finals. It was the Mavericks' first NBA championship, as well as both teams' second appearances in the Finals. Dirk Nowitzki was named Finals MVP. Like the Heat in 2006, the Mavericks experienced a post-championship letdown, getting swept by the Oklahoma City Thunder in the opening round of the 2012 NBA playoffs, and then missed the postseason entirely in 2013.

As of 2024, this was Miami's fifth championship out of a total of eight among the Big Four sports leagues; the MLB's National League Florida (now Miami) Marlins won the World Series in 1997 and 2003 while the NFL's Miami Dolphins won the Super Bowl in 1973 and 1974, and the NHL's Florida Panthers later joined this company by winning the Stanley Cup in 2024 and 2025. The Miami Heat would go on to win a second championship in 2012 against the Thunder in 5 games and a third championship in 2013 against the San Antonio Spurs in 7 games before falling in 2014 against the same Spurs team in 5 games. More recently, the Heat lost the 2020 NBA Finals and the 2023 NBA Finals to the Los Angeles Lakers and Denver Nuggets, respectively. The Mavericks lost to the Boston Celtics in the 2024 NBA Finals; coincidentally, the head coach Jason Kidd won a championship in 2011 with the team.

This was the first meeting between teams from Dallas and Miami for a major professional sports championship since Super Bowl VI in 1972, where the Dallas Cowboys defeated the Dolphins to claim their first of five Super Bowls. As of 2026, neither the city's NHL teams, the Stars and Panthers, nor their MLB counterparts, the Rangers and Marlins, have met in the postseason.
