= 2005–06 Miami Heat season =

Professional basketball team season (won NBA championship)

- NBA champions
- Conference champions
- Division champions
- Head coach: Stan Van Gundy (resigned) (through December 12, 2005); Pat Riley (after December 12, 2005)
- President: Pat Riley
- General manager: Randy Pfund
- Owner: Micky Arison
- Arena: American Airlines Arena

Results
- Record: 52–30 (.634)
- Place: Division: 1st (Southeast); Conference: 2nd (Eastern)
- Playoff finish: NBA champions (Defeated Mavericks 4–2)
- Stats at Basketball Reference

Local media
- Television: WBFS-TV; WFOR-TV; Sun Sports
- Radio: WIOD

The 2005–06 Miami Heat season was the 18th National Basketball Association season for the Miami Heat basketball franchise. During the offseason, the Heat acquired Jason Williams and James Posey from the Memphis Grizzlies, and All-Star forward Antoine Walker from the Boston Celtics, while signing free agent All-Star point guard Gary Payton. Early into the season, after a 11–10 start to the year, head coach Stan Van Gundy resigned, citing the desire to spend more time with his family, and Pat Riley resumed coaching the Heat. The Heat went 41–20 the rest of the way, finishing with a 52–30 record, good enough for first place in the Southeast Division and second place in the Eastern Conference overall. Dwyane Wade and Shaquille O'Neal were both selected for the 2006 NBA All-Star Game.

In the first round of the playoffs, the Heat defeated the Chicago Bulls in six games, and the New Jersey Nets in five games in the semi-finals to advance to the Eastern Conference Finals against the Detroit Pistons in a rematch of last year's playoffs. After splitting the first two games of the series, the Heat defeated the Pistons in six games to advance to the NBA Finals for the first time in franchise history, where they faced the Dallas Mavericks. After losing the first two games of the series, the Heat recovered to win the next four games and the first ever championship in franchise history. The team was nicknamed "15 Strong".

== Offseason ==
- In August 2005, Shaquille O'Neal signed a 5-year-extension with the Heat for $100 million. Supporters applauded O'Neal's willingness to take what amounted to a pay cut, and the Heat's decision to secure O'Neal's services for the long term. They contend that O'Neal was worth more than $20 million per year, particularly given that considerably less valuable players earn almost the same amount. Critics, however, questioned the wisdom of the move, characterizing it as overpaying an aging and often injured player.
- On August 2, 2005, the Heat were involved in one of the largest trades in NBA history. It was a five-team trade which included the Heat, the New Orleans Hornets, the Memphis Grizzlies, the Boston Celtics, and the Utah Jazz. The Heat traded Rasual Butler to the Hornets, Eddie Jones to the Grizzlies, and Albert Miralles, Qyntel Woods, a 2006 2nd round draft pick, and a 2008 2nd round draft pick to the Celtics. In return, the Heat received Antoine Walker from the Celtics, Andre Emmett, James Posey, and Jason Williams from the Grizzlies, and Roberto Dueñas from the Hornets. Walker would be a reliable bench player during the season. Posey and Williams would be starters at small forward and point guard, respectively. Emmett would be waived on October 31, while Dueñas would not sign with the team.

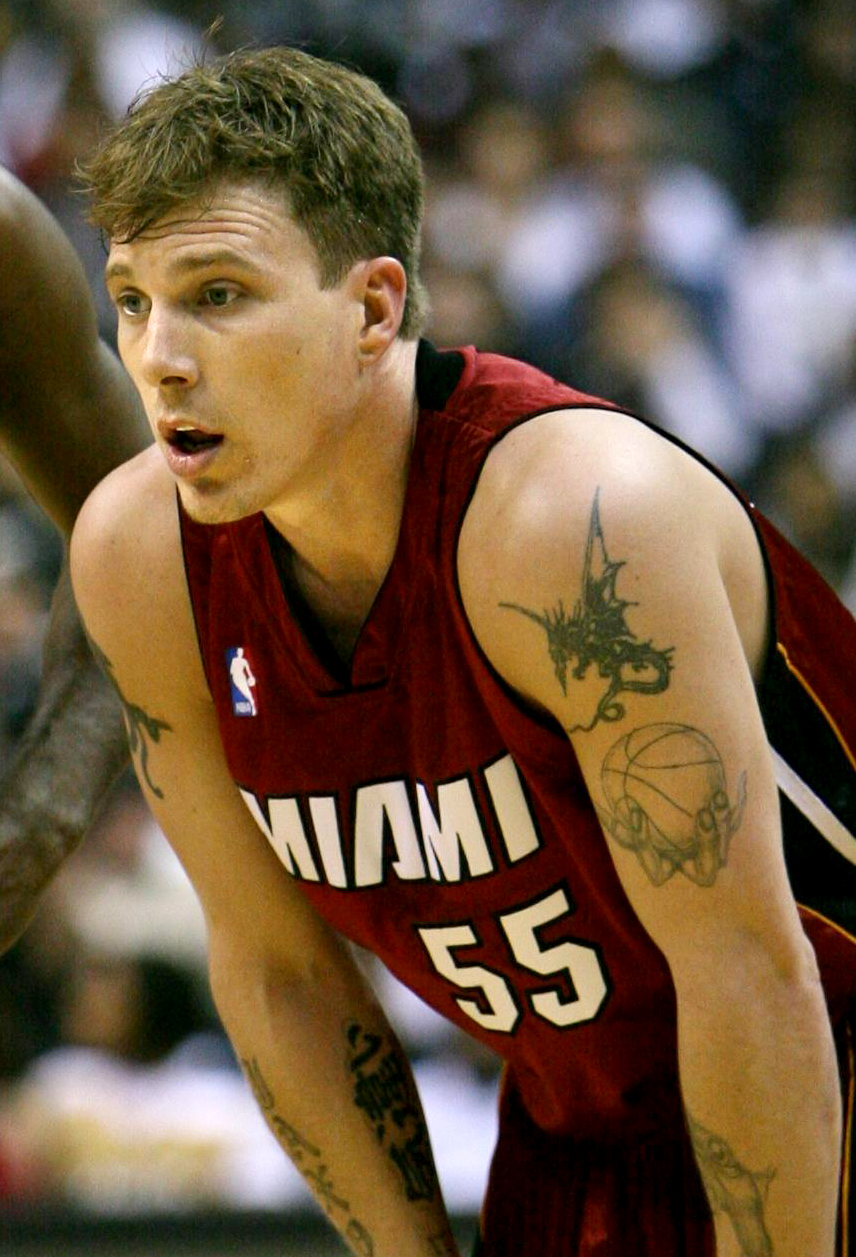
Jason Williams would be the starting point guard on the Heat.

On the same day, the Heat would sign Kasib Powell. He would sign with the Chicago Bulls on September 29, and the Bulls waived him on November 2. Powell may not have played on the Heat during the season, but would join the team two seasons later.

- On August 12, the Heat signed Gerald Fitch. Fitch would be traded to the Houston Rockets on February 23 for Derek Anderson.
- On August 15, the Heat signed Matt Walsh. Walsh would be waived on November 18.
- On September 22, the Heat signed Hall-of-Famer Gary Payton. Payton would play his final two seasons in the NBA with the Heat.
- On October 3, the Heat signed Jason Kapono.
- On October 8, the Heat signed Earl Barron.

=== NBA draft ===
Round	Pick	Player	Position	Nationality	School/Club team
1	29	Wayne Simien	Forward	United States	Kansas

== Roster ==
2005–06 Miami Heat roster
Players

Pos.	No.	Player	Height	Weight	DOB	From
G	5	Derek Anderson	6 ft 5 in (1.96 m)	220 lb (100 kg)	1974-07-18	Kentucky
G/F	49	Shandon Anderson	6 ft 6 in (1.98 m)	208 lb (94 kg)	1973-12-31	Georgia
C	30	Earl Barron	7 ft 0 in (2.13 m)	250 lb (113 kg)	1981-08-14	Memphis
C	51	Michael Doleac	6 ft 11 in (2.11 m)	262 lb (119 kg)	1977-06-15	Utah
F	40	Udonis Haslem	6 ft 8 in (2.03 m)	235 lb (107 kg)	1980-06-09	Florida
F	24	Jason Kapono	6 ft 8 in (2.03 m)	215 lb (98 kg)	1981-02-04	UCLA
C	33	Alonzo Mourning	6 ft 10 in (2.08 m)	240 lb (109 kg)	1970-02-08	Georgetown
C	32	Shaquille O'Neal	7 ft 1 in (2.16 m)	325 lb (147 kg)	1972-03-06	LSU
G	20	Gary Payton	6 ft 4 in (1.93 m)	180 lb (82 kg)	1968-07-23	Oregon State
F	42	James Posey	6 ft 8 in (2.03 m)	217 lb (98 kg)	1977-01-13	Xavier
F	25	Wayne Simien	6 ft 9 in (2.06 m)	260 lb (118 kg)	1983-03-09	Kansas
G	3	Dwyane Wade	6 ft 4 in (1.93 m)	220 lb (100 kg)	1982-01-17	Marquette
F	8	Antoine Walker	6 ft 9 in (2.06 m)	265 lb (120 kg)	1976-08-12	Kentucky
G	55	Jason Williams	6 ft 1 in (1.85 m)	180 lb (82 kg)	1975-11-18	Florida
F	1	Dorell Wright	6 ft 9 in (2.06 m)	205 lb (93 kg)	1985-12-02	South Kent (HS)

Coaches
Head coach
- Stan Van Gundy
- Pat Riley
Assistant(s)
- Keith Askins
- Bill Foran
- Bob McAdoo
- Ron Rothstein
- Erik Spoelstra

Legend
- (DP) Unsigned draft pick
- (FA) Free agent
- (S) Suspended
- Injured

Roster
Updated: February 23, 2006

== Regular season ==
- In the second game of the 2005–06 season, O'Neal injured his right ankle and subsequently missed the following 18 games. Many critics stated that Heat coach Pat Riley correctly managed O'Neal during the rest of the season, limiting his minutes to a career low. Riley felt doing so would allow O'Neal to be healthier and fresher come playoff time. Although O'Neal averaged career (or near-career) lows in points, rebounds, and blocks, he said in an interview "Stats don't matter. I care about winning, not stats. If I score 0 points and we win I'm happy. If I score 50, 60 points, break the records, and we lose, I'm pissed off. 'Cause I knew I did something wrong. I'll have a hell of a season if I win the championship and average 20 points a game." During the 2005–06 season, the Heat recorded only a .500 record without O'Neal in the line-up.
- During the 2005 off-season, it was widely speculated Pat Riley was attempting to run Van Gundy out of his coaching job and take over the job himself, as the team was in a position to contend for the championship. Van Gundy would resign from his position as head coach on December 12, 2005, just 21 games into the season, citing a need to spend more time with his family. Riley replaced him as head coach, and led Miami to their first championship that same season.

In Shaquille O'Neal's book, "Shaq Uncut: My Story", O'Neal responded to allegations of being a "coach killer" and that he forced Van Gundy out of Miami by stating: "Stan got fired because Pat (Riley) wanted to take over, not because I wanted him out. I had no control over it — not a smidgen of control. We all kind of knew it was coming because Pat and Stan were always arguing. Pat would come down and tell Stan how to do something and Stan would want to do it his own way, and that was a fine game plan if you wanted to get yourself fired."

- On April 11, 2006, Shaquille O'Neal recorded his second career triple-double against the Toronto Raptors with 15 points, 11 rebounds and a career high 10 assists.

=== Standings ===
Southeast Division	W	L	PCT	GB	Home	Road	Div
y-Miami Heat	52	30	.634	-	31–10	21–20	13–3
x-Washington Wizards	42	40	.512	10	27–14	15–26	8–8
Orlando Magic	36	46	.439	16	26–15	10–31	9–7
Charlotte Bobcats	26	56	.317	26	17–24	9–32	5–11
Atlanta Hawks	26	56	.317	26	18–23	8–33	5–11

=== Game log ===
2005–06 game log
Total: 52–30 (Home: 31–10; Road: 21–20)
November: 9–6 (home: 7–2; road: 2–4)

Game	Date	Team	Score	High points	High rebounds	High assists	Location Attendance	Record
1	November 2	@ Memphis	W 97–78	Antoine Walker (25)	Antoine Walker (16)	Dwyane Wade (6)	FedEx Forum; 18,119	1–0
2	November 3	Indiana	L 102–105	Dwyane Wade (31)	Udonis Haslem (8)	Dwyane Wade (10)	American Airlines Arena; 20,128	1-1
3	November 5	@ Milwaukee	L 100–105	Dwyane Wade (21)	Alonzo Mourning (12)	Dwyane Wade (9)	Bradley Center; 18,717	1–2
4	November 7	New Jersey	W 90–89	Dwyane Wade (23)	Alonzo Mourning (11)	Dwyane Wade (6)	American Airlines Arena; 19,600	2-2
5	November 9	@ Indiana	L 90–95	Dwyane Wade (29)	Wade, Haslem (11)	Dwyane Wade (6)	Conseco Fieldhouse; 17,586	2–3
6	November 10	Houston	W 88–84	Dwyane Wade (25)	Alonzo Mourning (9)	Dwyane Wade (7)	American Airlines Arena; 19,600	3-3
7	November 12	Charlotte	W 108–99	Jason Williams (22)	Udonis Haslem (11)	Williams, Wade (7)	American Airlines Arena; 19,600	4–3
8	November 15	New Orleans/Oklahoma City	W 109–102 (OT)	Dwyane Wade (25)	Alonzo Mourning (11)	Dwyane Wade (10)	American Airlines Arena; 19,600	5–3
9	November 18	Philadelphia	W 106–96	Dwyane Wade (32)	Udonis Haslem (12)	Dwyane Wade (10)	American Airlines Arena; 20,068	6–3
10	November 20	@ Toronto	L 94–107	Dwyane Wade (33)	Dwyane Wade (8)	Dwyane Wade (9)	Air Canada Centre; 17,594	6–4
11	November 23	Portland	W 100–79	Dwyane Wade (19)	Dwyane Wade (11)	three players tied (4)	American Airlines Arena; 19,600	7–4
12	November 25	Dallas	L 90–103	Jason Williams (24)	Udonis Haslem (8)	Jason Williams (5)	American Airlines Arena; 20,246	7–5
13	November 26	@ Orlando	L 77–80	Dwyane Wade (21)	Alonzo Mourning (21)	Dwyane Wade (4)	TD Waterhouse Centre; 16,619	7–6
14	November 28	New York	W 107–94	Dwyane Wade (33)	Udonis Haslem (12)	Jason Williams (6)	American Airlines Arena; 19,894	8–6
15	November 30	@ Atlanta	W 96–74	Jason Williams (21)	Alonzo Mourning (12)	Jason Williams (9)	Philips Arena; 16,029	9–6

December: 9–7 (home: 4–2; road: 5–5)

Game	Date	Team	Score	High points	High rebounds	High assists	Location Attendance	Record
16	December 2	@ Sacramento	W 98–87	Dwyane Wade (27)	Udonis Haslem (8)	Jason Williams (8)	ARCO Arena; 17,317	10–6
17	December 3	@ Denver	L 99–101	Dwyane Wade (32)	James Posey (10)	Dwyane Wade (6)	Pepsi Center; 18,196	10–7
18	December 5	@ L.A. Clippers	L 89–99	Dwyane Wade (29)	Alonzo Mourning (12)	Jason Williams (9)	Staples Center; 19,060	10–8
19	December 7	@ San Antonio	L 84–98	Dwyane Wade (31)	Alonzo Mourning (7)	Dwyane Wade (10)	SBC Center; 18,797	10–9
20	December 9	Denver	L 92–100	Dwyane Wade (37)	Dwyane Wade (10)	Antoine Walker (5)	American Airlines Arena; 19,896	10-10
21	December 11	Washington	W 104–101 (OT)	Dwyane Wade (41)	Shaquille O'Neal (11)	Dwyane Wade (8)	American Airlines Arena; 19,600	11–10
22	December 13	@ Chicago	W 100–97	Shaquille O'Neal (30)	Alonzo Mourning (12)	Dwyane Wade (11)	United Center; 19,129	12–10
23	December 14	@ Milwaukee	W 100–83	Dwyane Wade (27)	Udonis Haslem (10)	Dwyane Wade (7)	Bradley Center; 16,287	13–10
24	December 16	@ Philadelphia	W 112–105	Dwyane Wade (32)	Shaquille O'Neal (13)	Gary Payton (5)	Wachovia Center; 20,652	14–10
25	December 17	@ Cleveland	L 107–115	Dwyane Wade (33)	Shaquille O'Neal (6)	Wade, Walker (7)	Quicken Loans Arena; 20,562	14–11
26	December 20	Atlanta	W 111–92	Shaquille O'Neal (28)	Shaquille O'Neal (10)	Gary Payton (8)	American Airlines Arena; 20,294	15–11
27	December 23	New Jersey	L 88–95	Shaquille O'Neal (24)	Shaquille O'Neal (14)	Dwyane Wade (7)	American Airlines Arena; 20,065	15–12
28	December 25	L.A. Lakers	W 97–92	Gary Payton (21)	Shaquille O'Neal (17)	Dwyane Wade (5)	American Airlines Arena; 20,277	16–12
29	December 27	Milwaukee	W 109–98	Dwyane Wade (35)	Shaquille O'Neal (8)	Wade, Williams (7)	American Airlines Arena; 20,270	17–12
30	December 29	@ Detroit	L 101–106	Dwyane Wade (33)	Udonis Haslem (10)	Dwyane Wade (9)	The Palace of Auburn Hills; 22,076	17–13
31	December 30	@ Washington	W 128–113	Dwyane Wade (34)	Antoine Walker (13)	Gary Payton (7)	MCI Center; 20,173	18–13

January: 10–5 (home: 4–2; road: 6–3)

Game	Date	Team	Score	High points	High rebounds	High assists	Location Attendance	Record
32	January 1	Minnesota	W 97–70	Dwyane Wade (19)	Alonzo Mourning (10)	Dwyane Wade (9)	American Airlines Arena; 20,274	19–13
33	January 4	@ New Orleans/Oklahoma City	L 92–107	O'Neal, Wade (19)	Dwyane Wade (10)	Dwyane Wade (10)	Ford Center; 19,326	19–14
34	January 6	@ Phoenix	L 93–111	Antoine Walker (22)	Shaquille O'Neal (13)	Gerald Fitch (6)	US Airways Center; 18,422	19–15
35	January 8	@ Portland	W 118–89	Dwyane Wade (31)	James Posey (9)	Jason Williams (8)	Rose Garden; 18,032	20–15
36	January 11	@ Golden State	W 110–96	Dwyane Wade (32)	Haslem, O'Neal (10)	Dwyane Wade (11)	The Arena in Oakland; 20,075	21–15
37	January 13	@ Seattle	W 117–104	Posey, Williams (19)	Dwyane Wade (10)	Dwyane Wade (14)	KeyArena; 17,072	22–15
38	January 14	@ Utah	W 100–94	Dwyane Wade (31)	Shaquille O'Neal (14)	Dwyane Wade (8)	Delta Center; 19,911	23–15
39	January 16	@ L.A. Lakers	L 92–100	Dwyane Wade (34)	Udonis Haslem (12)	Dwyane Wade (7)	Staples Center; 18,997	23–16
40	January 20	San Antonio	L 94–101	Dwyane Wade (36)	Posey, Walker (7)	Haslem, Williams (3)	American Airlines Arena; 20,287	23–17
41	January 22	Sacramento	W 119–99	Shaquille O'Neal (27)	three players tied (6)	Jason Williams (11)	American Airlines Arena; 20,071	24–17
42	January 24	Memphis	W 94–82	Dwyane Wade (25)	Shaquille O'Neal (15)	Jason Williams (6)	American Airlines Arena; 19,600	25–17
43	January 26	Phoenix	L 98–107	Dwyane Wade (25)	Shaquille O'Neal (12)	Gary Payton (8)	American Airlines Arena; 20,025	25–18
44	January 27	@ Charlotte	W 91–85	Shaquille O'Neal (23)	Gerald Fitch (8)	Gary Payton (8)	Charlotte Bobcats Arena; 19,026	26–18
45	January 29	@ Houston	W 101–95	Dwyane Wade (32)	Shaquille O'Neal (14)	Dwyane Wade (9)	Toyota Center; 18,199	27–18
46	January 30	L.A. Clippers	W 118–114	Dwyane Wade (28)	Shaquille O'Neal (8)	Dwyane Wade (11)	American Airlines Arena; 19,600	28–18

February: 8–2 (home: 6–0; road: 2–2)

Game	Date	Team	Score	High points	High rebounds	High assists	Location Attendance	Record
47	February 2	Cleveland	W 101–73	Dwyane Wade (24)	James Posey (10)	Jason Williams (8)	American Airlines Arena; 20,168	29–18
48	February 4	@ New Jersey	L 92–105	Dwyane Wade (31)	Posey, O'Neal (7)	Jason Williams (7)	Continental Airlines Arena; 19,268	29–19
49	February 6	Boston	W 114–98	Dwyane Wade (34)	Dwyane Wade (8)	Dwyane Wade (8)	American Airlines Arena; 19,986	30–19
50	February 9	@ Dallas	L 76–112	Shaquille O'Neal (23)	Shaquille O'Neal (8)	Dwyane Wade (8)	American Airlines Center; 20,273	30–20
51	February 12	Detroit	W 100–98	Dwyane Wade (37)	Wade, O'Neal (8)	Jason Williams (5)	American Airlines Arena; 20,289	31–20
52	February 14	Orlando	W 107–93	Dwyane Wade (38)	Udonis Haslem (14)	Jason Williams (4)	American Airlines Arena; 19,600	32–20
53	February 15	@ Orlando	W 110–100	Dwyane Wade (36)	Udonis Haslem (12)	Dwyane Wade (9)	TD Waterhouse Centre; 17,283	33–20
All-Star Break
54	February 22	@ New York	W 103–83	Williams, Wade (24)	Udonis Haslem (8)	Williams, Wade (5)	Madison Square Garden; 19,763	34–20
55	February 25	Seattle	W 115–106	Shaquille O'Neal (31)	three players tied (9)	Dwyane Wade (11)	American Airlines Arena; 20,255	35–20
56	February 27	Toronto	W 101–94	Dwyane Wade (32)	Shaquille O'Neal (11)	Dwyane Wade (6)	American Airlines Arena; 19,600	36–20

March: 12–3 (home: 7–1; road: 5–2)

Game	Date	Team	Score	High points	High rebounds	High assists	Location Attendance	Record
57	March 1	@ Boston	W 103–96	Dwyane Wade (24)	Shaquille O'Neal (9)	Jason Williams (9)	TD Banknorth Garden; 18,624	37–20
58	March 4	Atlanta	W 95–93	Shaquille O'Neal (21)	Shaquille O'Neal (8)	Jason Williams (7)	American Airlines Arena; 20,023	38–20
59	March 6	@ Charlotte	W 106–105 (OT)	Shaquille O'Neal (35)	Udonis Haslem (13)	Jason Williams (5)	Charlotte Bobcats Arena; 17,165	39–20
60	March 8	Washington	W 118–112	Dwyane Wade (40)	Shaquille O'Neal (11)	Wade, Williams (5)	American Airlines Arena; 19,600	40–20
61	March 10	Golden State	L 106–111	Dwyane Wade (42)	Shaquille O'Neal (15)	Dwyane Wade (6)	American Airlines Arena; 19,600	40–21
62	March 12	Cleveland	W 98–92	Dwyane Wade (35)	Dwyane Wade (9)	Dwyane Wade (7)	American Airlines Arena; 20,268	41–21
63	March 14	Utah	W 121–83	Dwyane Wade (25)	three players tied (7)	Jason Williams (7)	American Airlines Arena; 19,600	42–21
64	March 16	Boston	W 107–104	Dwyane Wade (30)	Haslem, O'Neal (11)	Dwyane Wade (6)	American Airlines Arena; 20,188	43–21
65	March 18	@ Chicago	W 85–84	Dwyane Wade (15)	Udonis Haslem (11)	Jason Williams (5)	United Center; 22,439	44–21
66	March 19	@ New York	W 111–100	Dwyane Wade (30)	Udonis Haslem (7)	Wade, Williams (9)	Madison Square Garden; 19,763	45–21
67	March 21	@ Minnesota	L 96–100	Dwyane Wade (35)	Alonzo Mourning (12)	Dwyane Wade (8)	American Airlines Arena; 17,927	45–22
68	March 22	@ Detroit	L 73–82	Shaquille O'Neal (27)	Udonis Haslem (12)	Dwyane Wade (9)	The Palace of Auburn Hills; 22,076	45–23
69	March 24	Charlotte	W 114–93	Dwyane Wade (24)	Shaquille O'Neal (9)	Dwyane Wade (8)	American Airlines Arena; 20,146	46–23
70	March 27	Indiana	W 96–91	Shaquille O'Neal (23)	Shaquille O'Neal (11)	Dwyane Wade (5)	American Airlines Arena; 20,204	47–23
71	March 29	@ Toronto	W 98–94	Dwyane Wade (37)	Udonis Haslem (13)	Shandon Anderson (4)	Air Canada Centre; 19,973	48–23

April: 4–7 (home: 3–3; road: 1–4)

Game	Date	Team	Score	High points	High rebounds	High assists	Location Attendance	Record
72	April 1	@ Cleveland	L 99–106	Dwyane Wade (44)	Udonis Haslem (11)	Dwyane Wade (9)	Quicken Loans Arena; 20,562	48–24
73	April 2	@ New Jersey	L 78–90	Dwyane Wade (32)	Udonis Haslem (11)	Gary Payton (7)	Continental Airlines Arena; 18,928	48–25
74	April 4	Milwaukee	W 115–89	Shaquille O'Neal (24)	Shaquille O'Neal (10)	Dwyane Wade (8)	American Airlines Arena; 19,600	49–25
75	April 6	Detroit	L 82–95	Dwyane Wade (29)	Dwyane Wade (9)	Dwyane Wade (6)	American Airlines Arena; 20,290	49–26
76	April 8	@ Washington	W 99–86	Shaquille O'Neal (27)	Udonis Haslem (14)	Payton, Wade (8)	MCI Center; 20,173	50–26
77	April 9	Orlando	L 84–93	Dwyane Wade (27)	Shaquille O'Neal (9)	Dwyane Wade (7)	American Airlines Arena; 20,021	50–27
78	April 11	Toronto	W 106–97	Antoine Walker (32)	Shaquille O'Neal (11)	Shaquille O'Neal (10)	American Airlines Arena; 19,600	51–27
79	April 14	Philadelphia	W 104–85	Dwyane Wade (25)	Udonis Haslem (14)	Dwyane Wade (8)	American Airlines Arena; 20,268	52–27
80	April 16	Chicago	L 93–117	Antoine Walker (22)	Shaquille O'Neal (6)	D. Anderson, Williams (3)	American Airlines Arena; 20,248	52–28
81	April 18	@ Atlanta	L 100–103	Dorell Wright (19)	Michael Doleac (8)	Jason Kapono (6)	Philips Arena; 19,718	52–29
82	April 19	@ Boston	L 78–85	Dorell Wright (20)	Udonis Haslem (8)	Derek Anderson (4)	TD Banknorth Garden; 18,624	52–30

2005–06 schedule

== Playoffs ==
2006 playoff game log
First Round: 4–2 (home: 3–0; road: 1–2)

Game	Date	Team	Score	High points	High rebounds	High assists	Location Attendance	Series
1	April 22	Chicago	W 111–106	Dwyane Wade (30)	Shaquille O'Neal (16)	Dwyane Wade (11)	American Airlines Arena; 20,288	1–0
2	April 24	Chicago	W 115–108	Williams, O'Neal (22)	Antoine Walker (10)	Dwyane Wade (7)	American Airlines Arena; 20,214	2–0
3	April 27	@ Chicago	L 90–109	Dwyane Wade (26)	Udonis Haslem (10)	Wade, Williams (4)	United Center; 22,133	2–1
4	April 30	@ Chicago	L 87–93	Antoine Walker (21)	Udonis Haslem (9)	Dwyane Wade (10)	United Center; 22,361	2–2
5	May 2	Chicago	W 92–78	Dwyane Wade (28)	Shaquille O'Neal (10)	Dwyane Wade (5)	American Airlines Arena; 20,287	3–2
6	May 4	@ Chicago	W 113–96	Shaquille O'Neal (30)	Shaquille O'Neal (20)	Dwyane Wade (6)	United Center; 22,584	4–2

Conference Semifinals: 4–1 (home: 2–1; road: 2–0)

Game	Date	Team	Score	High points	High rebounds	High assists	Location Attendance	Series
1	May 8	New Jersey	L 88–100	Dwyane Wade (25)	Shaquille O'Neal (10)	Wade, Williams (3)	American Airlines Arena; 20,208	0–1
2	May 10	New Jersey	W 111–89	Dwyane Wade (31)	Udonis Haslem (10)	Dwyane Wade (6)	American Airlines Arena; 20,227	1–1
3	May 12	@ New Jersey	W 103–92	Dwyane Wade (30)	James Posey (10)	Dwyane Wade (10)	Continental Airlines Arena; 20,102	2–1
4	May 14	@ New Jersey	W 102–92	Dwyane Wade (31)	Udonis Haslem (11)	Dwyane Wade (8)	Continental Airlines Arena; 19,474	3–1
5	May 16	New Jersey	W 106–105	Antoine Walker (23)	Udonis Haslem (10)	Dwyane Wade (6)	American Airlines Arena; 20,255	4–1

Conference Finals: 4–2 (home: 3–0; road: 1–2)

Game	Date	Team	Score	High points	High rebounds	High assists	Location Attendance	Series
1	May 23	@ Detroit	W 91–86	Dwyane Wade (25)	Udonis Haslem (9)	Dwyane Wade (5)	The Palace of Auburn Hills; 22,076	1–0
2	May 25	@ Detroit	L 88–92	Dwyane Wade (32)	Shaquille O'Neal (17)	Dwyane Wade (5)	The Palace of Auburn Hills; 22,076	1–1
3	May 27	Detroit	W 98–83	Dwyane Wade (35)	Shaquille O'Neal (12)	Walker, Wade (4)	American Airlines Arena; 20,245	2–1
4	May 29	Detroit	W 89–78	Dwyane Wade (31)	Shaquille O'Neal (9)	Dwyane Wade (5)	American Airlines Arena; 20,248	3–1
5	May 31	@ Detroit	L 78–91	Dwyane Wade (23)	Udonis Haslem (10)	Jason Williams (6)	The Palace of Auburn Hills; 22,076	3–2
6	June 2	Detroit	W 95–78	Shaquille O'Neal (28)	Shaquille O'Neal (16)	Dwyane Wade (10)	American Airlines Arena; 20,258	4–2

NBA Finals: 4–2 (home: 3–0; road: 1–2)

Game	Date	Team	Score	High points	High rebounds	High assists	Location Attendance	Series
1	June 8	@ Dallas	L 80–90	Dwyane Wade (28)	Udonis Haslem (9)	Dwyane Wade (6)	American Airlines Center; 20,475	0–1
2	June 11	@ Dallas	L 85–99	Dwyane Wade (23)	Dwyane Wade (8)	Payton, Williams (4)	American Airlines Center; 20,459	0–2
3	June 13	Dallas	W 98–96	Dwyane Wade (42)	Dwyane Wade (13)	Shaquille O'Neal (5)	American Airlines Arena; 20,145	1–2
4	June 15	Dallas	W 98–74	Dwyane Wade (36)	Shaquille O'Neal (13)	Jason Williams (6)	American Airlines Arena; 20,145	2–2
5	June 18	Dallas	W 101–100 (OT)	Dwyane Wade (43)	Shaquille O'Neal (12)	Wade, Williams (4)	American Airlines Arena; 20,145	3–2
6	June 20	@ Dallas	W 95–92	Dwyane Wade (36)	Shaquille O'Neal (12)	Jason Williams (7)	American Airlines Center; 20,522	4–2

2006 schedule

== 2006 NBA Finals ==
=== Game One ===
Dallas' Jason Terry scored a playoff-high 32 points as the Mavericks overcame a 31–23 deficit at the end of the first quarter.

June 8
21:00 ET

1

Miami Heat 80, Dallas Mavericks 90
Scoring by quarter: 31–23, 13–23, 24–24, 12–20
Pts: Dwyane Wade 28; Rebs: Udonis Haslem 8 Asts: Dwyane Wade 6	Pts: Jason Terry 32; Rebs: Josh Howard 12; Asts: Nowitzki, Howard 4 each
Dallas leads series, 1–0.

American Airlines Center, Dallas
Attendance: 20,475
Referees: Joe Crawford, Joe DeRosa, Bennett Salvatore

=== Game Two ===
Dirk Nowitzki had a stellar 26-point-16 rebound performance, and the Mavericks cruised past the Heat to take a 2–0 series lead.

ABC

June 11
21:00 ET

2

Miami Heat 85, Dallas Mavericks 99
Scoring by quarter: 17–18, 17–32, 24–32, 27–17
Pts: Dwyane Wade 23; Rebs: Dwyane Wade 8 Asts: Payton, Williams 4 each	Pts: Dirk Nowitzki 26; Rebs: Dirk Nowitzki 16; Asts: Jason Terry 9
Dallas leads series, 2–0.

American Airlines Center, Dallas
Attendance: 20,459
Referees: Bob Delaney, Steve Javie, Eddie F. Rush

=== Game Three ===
Led by Dwyane Wade's 42 points and 13 rebounds, the Heat rallied from a 13-point deficit with six minutes to go in the fourth quarter. The momentum-changing comeback was capped by a Gary Payton field goal from just inside the three-point line with 9.3 seconds left.

ABC

June 13
21:00 ET

3

Dallas Mavericks 96, Miami Heat 98
Scoring by quarter: 21–29, 22–23, 34–16, 19–30
Pts: Dirk Nowitzki 30; Rebs: Erick Dampier 9 Asts: Jason Terry 5	Pts: Dwyane Wade 42; Rebs: Dwyane Wade 13; Asts: Shaquille O'Neal 5
Dallas leads series, 2–1.

AmericanAirlines Arena, Miami
Attendance: 20,145
Referees: Dan Crawford, Ken Mauer, Jack Nies

=== Game Four ===
Dwyane Wade shined again for the Heat with 36 points, and Miami held Dallas to just seven points in the fourth quarter en route to a series-tying, blowout victory. The Mavericks' low-scoring fourth quarter was the lowest ever by any team during the NBA Finals. Jerry Stackhouse caught Shaquille O'Neal with a flagrant foul that resulted in his suspension for Game 5.

ABC

June 15
21:00 ET

4

Dallas Mavericks 74, Miami Heat 98
Scoring by quarter: 25–30, 19–24, 23–24, 7–20
Pts: Jason Terry 17; Rebs: Dirk Nowitzki 9 Asts: Jerry Stackhouse 4	Pts: Dwyane Wade 36; Rebs: Shaquille O'Neal 13; Asts: Jason Williams 6
Miami ties series, 2–2.

AmericanAirlines Arena, Miami
Attendance: 20,145
Referees: Dick Bavetta, Mike Callahan, Bernie Fryer

=== Game Five ===
Making a strong case for NBA Finals MVP, Wade was the star yet again with 43 points shooting as many free throws as all the Mavericks combined, leading the Heat to their third straight win over Dallas after being down 0–2 in the series. After a controversial play in which Mavericks owner Mark Cuban thought Wade committed a backcourt violation, Wade hit the game-winning free throws with 1.9 seconds left, and also made the shot that sent the game into overtime. He set an NBA Finals record for most made free-throws in a game with 21. The NBA, upon further review of the play, deemed that the officials made the correct call, and that there was no backcourt violation committed.

After the game, Dirk Nowitzki kicked a ball into the stands and Mavericks owner Mark Cuban caused many "acts of misconduct" resulting in both of them being fined $5,000 and $250,000 respectively.

ABC

June 18
21:00 ET

5

Dallas Mavericks 100, Miami Heat 101 (OT)
Scoring by quarter: 21–24, 30–19, 20–27, 22–23, Overtime: 7–8
Pts: Jason Terry 35; Rebs: Josh Howard 10; Asts: Marquis Daniels 4	Pts: Dwyane Wade 43; Rebs: Shaquille O'Neal 12; Asts: Wade, Williams 4 each
Miami leads series, 3–2.

AmericanAirlines Arena, Miami
Attendance: 20,145
Referees: Joe Crawford, Joe DeRosa, Bennett Salvatore

=== Game Six ===
Behind Dwyane Wade's 36 points, Miami edged Dallas to win their first championship in franchise history. Averaging 34.7 points per game in the championship series, Wade was named NBA Finals MVP (Most Valuable Player).

ABC

June 20
21:00 ET

6

Miami Heat 95, Dallas Mavericks 92
Scoring by quarter: 23–30, 26–18, 22–20, 24–24
Pts: Dwyane Wade 36; Rebs: Shaquille O'Neal 12; Asts: Jason Williams 7	Pts: Dirk Nowitzki 29; Rebs: Dirk Nowitzki 12; Asts: Jason Terry 5
Miami wins series, 4–2.

American Airlines Center, Dallas
Attendance: 20,522
Referees: Dan Crawford, Steve Javie, Eddie F. Rush

== Player statistics ==
=== Regular season ===
Player	POS	GP	GS	MP	REB	AST	STL	BLK	PTS	MPG	RPG	APG	SPG	BPG	PPG
Antoine Walker	PF	82	19	2,199	421	166	47	30	1,000	26.8	5.1	2.0	.6	.4	12.2
Udonis Haslem	PF	81	80	2,491	634	95	50	17	757	30.8	7.8	1.2	.6	.2	9.3
Gary Payton	PG	81	25	2,305	233	257	71	10	626	28.5	2.9	3.2	.9	.1	7.7
Dwyane Wade	SG	75	75	2,892	430	503	146	58	2,040	38.6	5.7	6.7	1.9	.8	27.2
James Posey	SF	67	63	1,914	319	89	54	20	483	28.6	4.8	1.3	.8	.3	7.2
Alonzo Mourning	C	65	20	1,302	359	11	13	173	509	20.0	5.5	.2	.2	2.7	7.8
Shaquille O'Neal	C	59	58	1,806	541	113	23	104	1,181	30.6	9.2	1.9	.4	1.8	20.0
Jason Williams	PG	59	56	1,874	139	287	53	5	728	31.8	2.4	4.9	.9	.1	12.3
Jason Kapono	SF	51	2	665	71	37	7	3	207	13.0	1.4	.7	.1	.1	4.1
Shandon Anderson	SF	48	1	638	81	30	17	6	126	13.3	1.7	.6	.4	.1	2.6
Wayne Simien	PF	43	2	414	88	7	13	1	146	9.6	2.0	.2	.3	.0	3.4
Michael Doleac	C	31	3	371	85	8	10	7	98	12.0	2.7	.3	.3	.2	3.2
Derek Anderson^{†}	SG	23	3	465	60	48	8	2	133	20.2	2.6	2.1	.3	.1	5.8
Dorell Wright	SF	20	2	132	32	8	3	1	58	6.6	1.6	.4	.2	.1	2.9
Gerald Fitch	PG	18	1	239	30	33	7	5	84	13.3	1.7	1.8	.4	.3	4.7
Earl Barron	C	8	0	45	10	0	0	0	13	5.6	1.3	.0	.0	.0	1.6
Matt Walsh	SG	2	0	3	0	0	0	0	2	1.5	.0	.0	.0	.0	1.0

- ^{†} Denotes player spent time with another team in the season. Stats reflect time with the Heat only.

=== Playoffs ===
Player	POS	GP	GS	MP	REB	AST	STL	BLK	PTS	MPG	RPG	APG	SPG	BPG	PPG
Dwyane Wade	SG	23	23	959	135	132	51	26	654	41.7	5.9	5.7	2.2	1.1	28.4
Antoine Walker	PF	23	23	862	129	56	23	8	307	37.5	5.6	2.4	1.0	.3	13.3
Shaquille O'Neal	C	23	23	759	225	39	11	34	424	33.0	9.8	1.7	.5	1.5	18.4
Jason Williams	PG	23	23	686	46	90	15	0	214	29.8	2.0	3.9	.7	.0	9.3
Gary Payton	PG	23	0	560	40	36	23	3	133	24.3	1.7	1.6	1.0	.1	5.8
Udonis Haslem	PF	22	22	650	162	17	13	7	189	29.5	7.4	.8	.6	.3	8.6
James Posey	SF	22	1	607	125	20	17	2	160	27.6	5.7	.9	.8	.1	7.3
Alonzo Mourning	C	21	0	226	61	3	5	24	80	10.8	2.9	.1	.2	1.1	3.8
Shandon Anderson	SF	13	0	90	12	4	0	1	13	6.9	.9	.3	.0	.1	1.0
Michael Doleac	C	8	0	72	22	0	1	0	16	9.0	2.8	.0	.1	.0	2.0
Derek Anderson	SG	8	0	66	9	5	2	0	24	8.3	1.1	.6	.3	.0	3.0
Wayne Simien	PF	2	0	7	1	0	0	0	0	3.5	.5	.0	.0	.0	.0
Jason Kapono	SF	1	0	2	0	0	0	0	0	2.0	.0	.0	.0	.0	.0

== Award winners ==
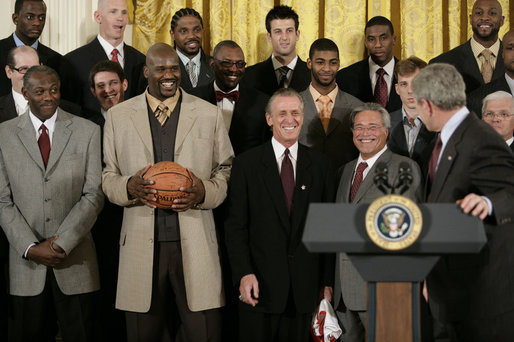
O'Neal handing over the championship ball when the NBA Champion Heat visited the House.

- Shaquille O'Neal, NBA leader in field goal percentage
  - He joined Wilt Chamberlain as the only two players in league history to lead the league in field goal percentage nine times.
- Shaquille O'Neal, All-NBA First Team
- Dwyane Wade, NBA All-Star Skills Challenge Champion
- Dwyane Wade, All-NBA Second Team
- Dwyane Wade, NBA Finals MVP
- Dwyane Wade, Sports Illustrated Sportsman of the Year

NBA All-Star Game

- Dwyane Wade, NBA All-Star Game Appearance
- Shaquille O'Neal, NBA All-Star Appearance
