= Shandon Anderson =

American basketball player (born 1973)

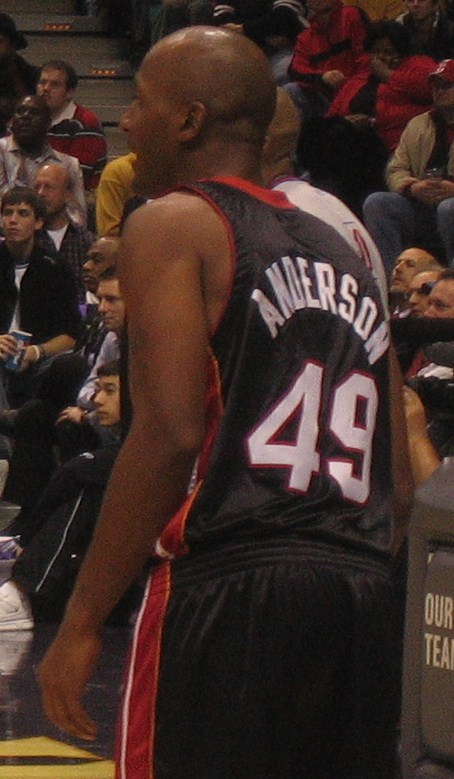
- Anderson with the Miami Heat in 2005

Personal information
- Born: December 31, 1973 (age 52) Atlanta, Georgia, U.S.
- Listed height: 6 ft 6 in (1.98 m)
- Listed weight: 208 lb (94 kg)

Career information
- High school: Alonzo A. Crim (Atlanta, Georgia)
- College: Georgia (1992–1996)
- NBA draft: 1996: 2nd round, 54th overall pick
- Drafted by: Utah Jazz
- Playing career: 1996–2006
- Position: Small forward / shooting guard
- Number: 40, 49

Career history
- 1996–1999: Utah Jazz
- 1999–2001: Houston Rockets
- 2001–2004: New York Knicks
- 2004–2006: Miami Heat

Career highlights
- NBA champion (2006)

Career NBA statistics
- Points: 5,327 (7.4 ppg)
- Rebounds: 2,252 (3.1 rpg)
- Assists: 1,007 (1.4 apg)
- Stats at NBA.com
- Stats at Basketball Reference

Shandon Rodriguez Anderson (born December 31, 1973) is an American former professional basketball player who played in the National Basketball Association (NBA) from 1996 to 2006. He is the younger brother of former Spurs, Knicks and Heat player Willie Anderson.

Anderson attended Alonzo A. Crim High School in Atlanta, then played basketball at the University of Georgia. A shooting guard and small forward, he was drafted in the second round (54th overall) of the 1996 NBA draft by the Utah Jazz while ultimately playing for the Jazz, the Houston Rockets, the New York Knicks, and the Miami Heat. His best season was in 1999–2000, when he averaged 12.3 points per game with the Rockets.

In 2001, Anderson signed a 6-year, $42 million deal (valued at $79.2 million in 2026) with the Knicks as a facet of a larger trade sending star Glen Rice to Houston from New York. Knicks coach Jeff Van Gundy noted the positional versatility Anderson would offer while also being more of a slasher and defender than Rice. General manager Scott Layden - familiar with Anderson while in the Jazz organization - praised his professionalism and ability to adapt to different roles. In January 2004, Anderson reached 543 consecutive games played, which was the longest streak in the league at the time. By the fall of 2004, the 30 year-old veteran had worn out his welcome under president Isiah Thomas and had the rest of his remaining contract bought out by the team. He was waived with three years left at $24 million of the original amount while he was shopped unsuccessfully in trade talks. It was a result of disagreements about Anderson playing through migraines, his failure to show at their playoff loss exit interview, and not appearing at mandatory charity events.

Anderson won an NBA championship in 2006 with the Miami Heat as a backup, and subsequently retired. He is now the head basketball coach at Dunbar High School in Fort Myers, Florida.

== NBA career statistics ==
Legend
GP	Games played	GS	Games started	MPG	Minutes per game
FG%	Field goal percentage	3P%	3-point field goal percentage	FT%	Free throw percentage
RPG	Rebounds per game	APG	Assists per game	SPG	Steals per game
BPG	Blocks per game	PPG	Points per game	**Bold**	Career high
†	Won an NBA championship	*	Led the league

=== Regular season ===
Year	Team	GP	GS	MPG	FG%	3P%	FT%	RPG	APG	SPG	BPG	PPG
1996–97	Utah	65	0	16.4	.462	**.511**	.687	2.8	.8	.4	.1	5.9
1997–98	Utah	**82***	2	19.5	**.538**	.219	.735	2.8	1.1	.8	.2	8.3
1998–99	Utah	50*	2	21.4	.446	.341	.712	2.6	1.1	.8	.2	8.5
1999–00	Houston	**82**	**82***	**32.9**	.473	.351	.767	**4.7**	**2.9**	**1.2**	.4	**12.3**
2000–01	Houston	**82**	**82***	29.2	.446	.271	.734	4.1	2.3	1.0	**.5**	8.7
2001–02	New York	**82**	6	19.5	.399	.277	.692	3.0	.9	.6	.2	5.0
2002–03	New York	**82**	9	21.1	.462	.371	.732	3.1	1.1	.9	.2	8.4
2003–04	New York	80	37	24.6	.422	.281	.764	2.8	1.5	.9	.2	7.9
2004–05	New York	1	0	20.0	.000	.000	—	1.0	.0	.0	.0	.0
2004–05	Miami	65	5	17.7	.456	.179	**.818**	2.9	1.1	.6	.2	3.9
2005–06†	Miami	48	1	13.3	.429	.263	.722	1.7	.6	.4	.1	2.6
Career		719	226	22.2	.457	.316	.739	3.1	1.4	.8	.3	7.4

=== Playoffs ===
Year	Team	GP	GS	MPG	FG%	3P%	FT%	RPG	APG	SPG	BPG	PPG
1997	Utah	18	0	16.4	.439	.417	.714	2.7	.7	.6	.1	4.6
1998	Utah	**20**	0	18.9	**.515**	.273	.676	3.2	1.0	.3	.1	6.7
1999	Utah	11	0	27.0	.481	**.429**	.706	**3.7**	1.2	.5	**.3**	**9.5**
2004	New York	4	**4**	**29.2**	.259	.286	.500	2.3	**2.8**	**1.0**	**.3**	4.3
2005	Miami	8	0	11.9	.250	.000	**1.000**	2.4	1.0	.6	.0	1.0
2006†	Miami	13	0	6.9	.308	.333	.667	.9	.3	.0	.1	1.0
Career		74	4	17.2	.446	.354	.697	2.6	.9	.4	.1	4.9
