= Udonis Haslem =

American basketball player (born 1980)

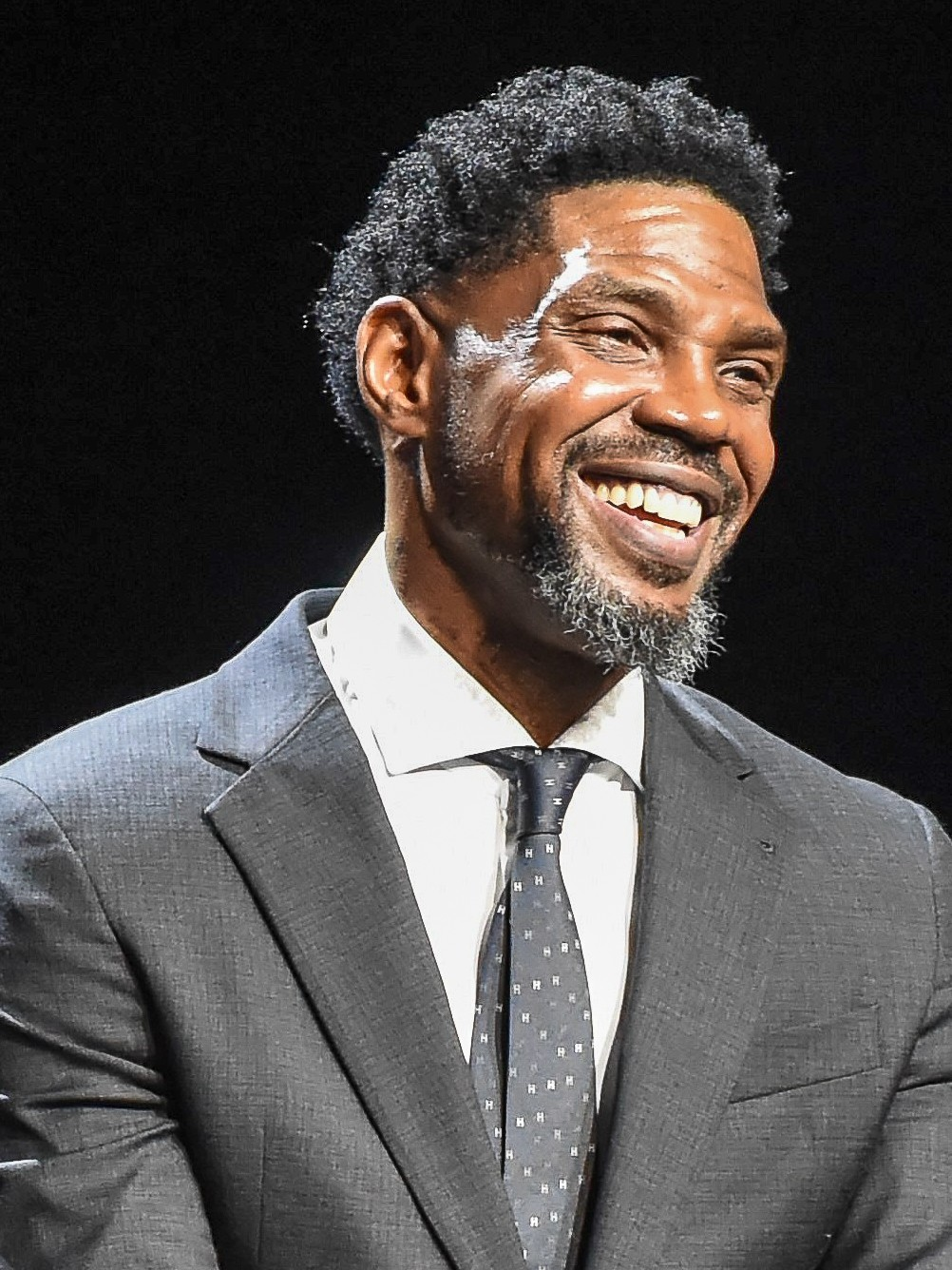
- Haslem in 2024

Miami Heat
- Title: Vice president of basketball development
- League: NBA

Personal information
- Born: June 9, 1980 (age 46) Miami, Florida, U.S.
- Listed height: 6 ft 7 in (2.01 m)
- Listed weight: 235 lb (107 kg)

Career information
- High school: Samuel Wolfson (Jacksonville, Florida); Miami Senior (Miami, Florida)
- College: Florida (1998–2002)
- NBA draft: 2002: undrafted
- Playing career: 2002–2023
- Position: Power forward / center
- Number: 15, 40

Career history
- 2002–2003: Chalon-sur-Saône
- 2003–2023: Miami Heat

Career highlights
- 3× NBA champion (2006, 2012, 2013); NBA All-Rookie Second Team (2004); No. 40 retired by Miami Heat; Second-team All-American – NABC (2002); Third-team All-American – AP (2001); 2× First-team All-SEC (2001, 2002); 2× Third-team All-SEC (1999, 2000)

Career NBA statistics
- Points: 6,586 (7.5 ppg)
- Rebounds: 5,791 (6.6 rpg)
- Assists: 733 (0.8 apg)
- Stats at NBA.com
- Stats at Basketball Reference

Udonis Johneal Haslem (/juːˈdɒnɪs dʒɒˈniːl ˈhæzləm/ yoo-DON-iss jon-EEL HAZ-ləm; born June 9, 1980) is an American professional basketball executive and former player. He is the vice president of basketball development for the Miami Heat, where he spent his entire 20-year playing career in the National Basketball Association (NBA). Haslem is one of only three players in NBA history to play at least 20 years with one team. He played college basketball for the Florida Gators, where he was a key member of four NCAA tournament teams. Haslem began his professional career in France with Chalon-sur-Saône and then signed with his hometown team, the Miami Heat, in 2003, leaving as the longest-tenured player in franchise history when he retired 20 years later. Haslem won three NBA championships in 2006, 2012 and 2013.

== Early life ==
Haslem was born in Miami. His father, John, played college basketball for the Stetson Hatters from 1972 to 1974. His mother, Debra, was Puerto Rican. Haslem attended Wolfson High School in Jacksonville, Florida, then Miami Senior High School in Miami. He helped lead Miami High to state titles in 1997 and 1998 (the last two of three in a row), playing alongside another future NBA player, Steve Blake. The team was coached by UMass Amherst head coach Frank Martin.

However, an investigation by the Miami New Times revealed that Haslem, Blake and several other players circumvented residency requirements. The New Times reported that while he claimed to live in Miami, Haslem lived in Miramar. His official school address was an efficiency apartment owned by a longtime Miami High booster, which was also a violation of Florida High School Athletic Association (FHSAA) rules. As a result, Miami High was stripped of its 1998 title and ordered to forfeit its entire schedule.

== College career ==
Haslem accepted an athletic scholarship to attend the University of Florida in Gainesville, Florida, where he played for coach Billy Donovan's Gators teams from 1998 to 2002 while majoring in leisure service management. As the Gators' starting center for four years, Haslem was part of Donovan's 1998 recruiting class that raised the national prominence of the Florida Gators basketball program and included future Miami Heat teammate Mike Miller. Haslem's sophomore season saw the team advance to the NCAA Division I men's basketball championship game before falling to Michigan State 89–76. The Gators received NCAA tournament invitations four consecutive years during Haslem's college career—the first time in the program's history. During his tenure with Florida, Haslem averaged 13.7 points per game and 6.7 rebounds. He was named to the coaches' All-Southeastern Conference (SEC) team four times: as the third team in 1999 and 2000, and the first team in 2001 and 2002. Haslem also ranks third in team history in points scored (1,782) and tenth in rebounds (831). He was inducted into the University of Florida Athletic Hall of Fame as a "Gator Great" in 2012.

== Professional career ==
=== Chalon-Sur-Saône (2002–2003) ===
Haslem went undrafted in the 2002 NBA draft primarily due to his relative lack of size for a forward as he measured just 6 ft 6 in (1.98 m) at the NBA pre-draft camp. Seattle SuperSonics coach Nate McMillan had promised to draft Haslem if he was still available in the second round, but the offer fell through. Haslem accepted an offer to join the Atlanta Hawks for training camp and made their roster for the Shaw's Pro Summer League. However, he was released by the Hawks before the start of the 2002–03 NBA season.

Haslem signed with Chalon-Sur-Saône of the French LNB Pro A. He arrived in France weighing nearly 300 pounds (140 kg). While in France, Haslem lost 50 pounds (23 kg) in eight months. He averaged 16.1 points and 9.4 rebounds per game in his lone season with the team.

=== Miami Heat (2003–2023) ===
==== 2003–08: All-Rookie honors and first championship ====
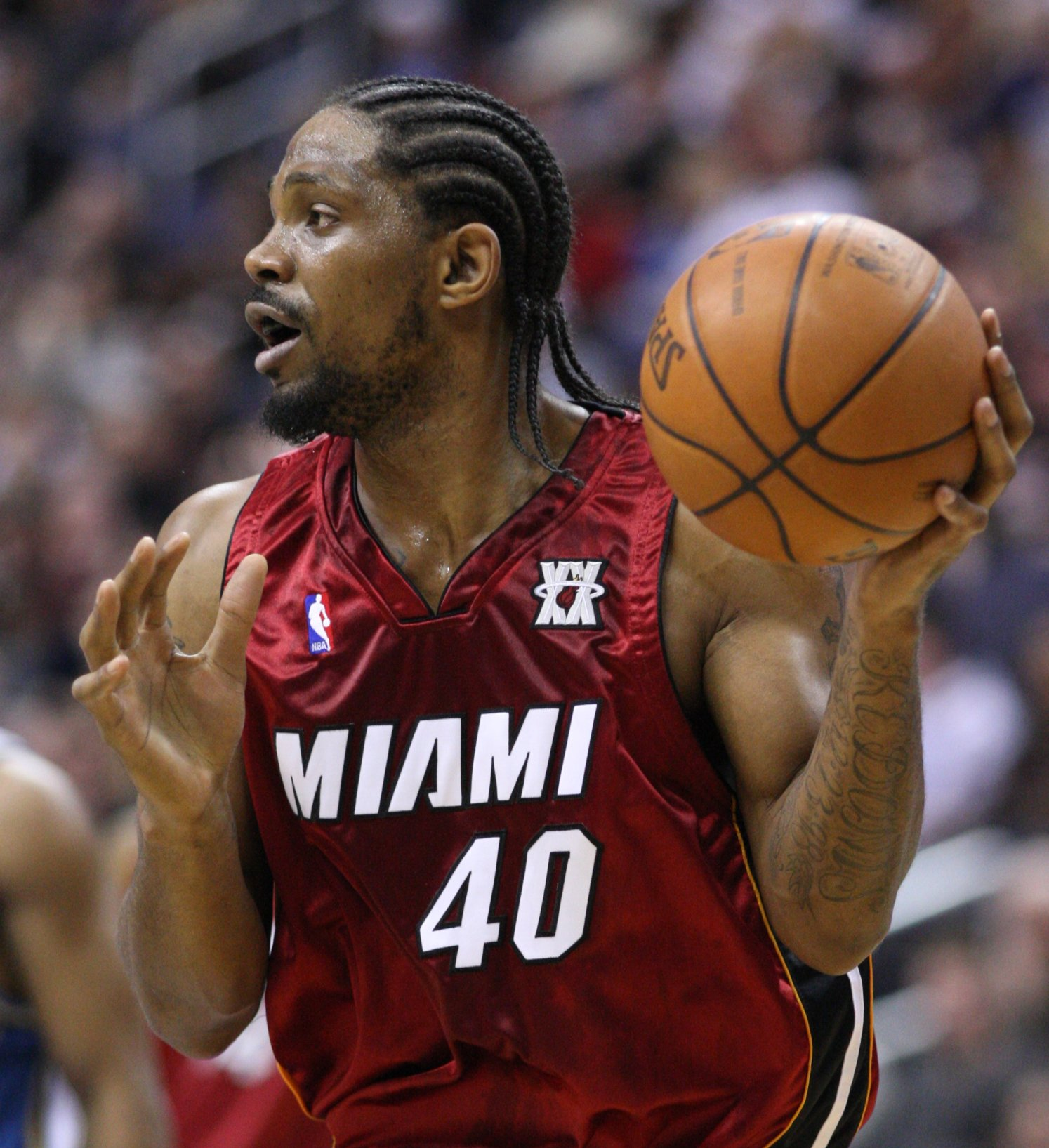
Haslem in 2007

On August 6, 2003, Haslem signed with his hometown team, the Miami Heat. As a rookie, Haslem played in the Rookie Challenge during All-Star weekend, earned NBA All-Rookie Second Team honors, and helped the Heat reach the Eastern Conference Semifinals.

In 2004–05, Haslem started in all 80 games in which he appeared, averaging 10.9 points, a career-high 9.1 rebounds and 1.4 assists in 33.4 minutes per game. Haslem's .540 field goal percentage ranked fifth on the Heat's all-time single-season list then and fourth in the NBA. He appeared in Rookie Challenge for the second straight year, this time for the sophomore team.

Haslem re-signed with the Heat in August 2005. In June 2006, he helped the Heat win their first NBA Championship in six games over the Dallas Mavericks in the NBA Finals. Haslem recorded 17 points and 10 rebounds in the title-clinching Game 6.

Haslem scored a career-high 28 points on November 10, 2006, in a 113–106 victory over the New Jersey Nets.

Since the 2007–08 season, Haslem was the team captain for the Heat. On January 29, 2008, Haslem—who had been the only Miami player to start all 43 games of the 2007–08 season—suffered a sprained ankle during a 117–87 loss to the Boston Celtics. He returned to action on February 23, only to play in five games before being ruled out for the rest of the season after reaggravating the ankle injury on March 7 against the Golden State Warriors. Haslem averaged a career-high 12.0 points per game in 2007–08.

==== 2009–13: Back-to-back championships ====
In July 2010, Haslem signed a five-year deal worth approximately $20 million to remain with the Heat. The contract paid him roughly $14 million less than Haslem could have received if he accepted more lucrative offers from the Dallas Mavericks or Denver Nuggets. Haslem continued on with a new-look Heat roster that included LeBron James and Chris Bosh teaming up with Dwyane Wade. In November 2010, Haslem sustained a torn ligament in his foot, which sidelined him for the rest of the regular season. Haslem returned to action in May 2011 during the playoffs. That June, the Heat were defeated in six games by the Mavericks during the 2011 NBA Finals.

Haslem helped the Heat return to the NBA Finals in 2012, where they defeated the Oklahoma City Thunder in five games with Haslem winning his second championship.

In November 2012, Haslem passed Alonzo Mourning to become the franchise leader in total rebounds with 4,808, breaking Mourning's previous record of 4,807. Haslem also became the first undrafted player to lead an NBA franchise in rebounding. In June 2013, Haslem won his third championship after the Heat defeated the San Antonio Spurs in seven games in the 2013 NBA Finals. After the NBA Finals, Haslem revealed that he had played through much of the second half of the 2012–13 season with a torn right meniscus.

==== 2013–23: "Player-coach" role and retirement ====
In 2013–14, Haslem lost the rotation spot that he had long occupied, and his on-court time continued to diminish significantly as the season progressed. Haslem played in just seven games in January and February combined, and played only two total minutes from January 21 to February 27. He played in just 46 regular season games in 2013–14, averaging 3.8 points and 3.8 rebounds. The Heat returned to the NBA Finals in 2014 for the fourth straight year, where they were defeated in five games by the Spurs. Following the 2013–14 season, Haslem decided to opt out of the final year of his contract.

Haslem re-signed with the Heat on a two-year deal in July 2014. At this point of his career, Haslem transitioned into a role that he and the organization described as a "player-coach", in that he rarely played on court but was more of a mentor to the younger players and assisted in their coaching. Haslem re-signed with the Heat on one-year deals in 2016, 2017, and 2018. In January 2019, Haslem indicated that the 2018–19 season would be his last. However, a few months later, Haslem stated that he had not decided if he was retiring and the decision would not be made until the 2019–20 season.

On August 6, 2019, Haslem re-signed with the Heat on a one-year contract. During the 2019–20 season, he played in four games, including starting at power forward in a 109–92 loss to the Indiana Pacers during the regular-season finale. During that season, Haslem became the 30th player in league history to play after turning 40 years old, as well as the first modern era undrafted player to play to that age. Following Vince Carter's retirement during the suspension of the season due to the COVID-19 pandemic, Haslem became the oldest active player in the NBA. The Heat reached the 2020 NBA Finals, losing in six games to the Los Angeles Lakers; Haslem was on the active roster but did not play in the postseason.

On November 28, 2020, Haslem re-signed with the Heat. He played in one game in the 2020–21 season, on May 13, 2021, against the Philadelphia 76ers. Haslem scored four points in two minutes off the bench before getting ejected as a result of a scuffle with Dwight Howard, making the 40-year-old Haslem the oldest player in the last 20 years to get ejected.

On August 15, 2021, Haslem re-signed with the Heat.

On August 23, 2022, Haslem announced his intentions to retire after the 2022–23 season, re-signing with the Heat for another year. In his final regular season game on April 9, 2023, Haslem scored 24 points in 25 minutes during a 123–110 victory over the Orlando Magic. He became the second 42-year-old in NBA history to score 24 or more points in a game after Kareem Abdul-Jabbar did so in Game 3 of the 1989 NBA Finals and it marked Haslem's highest-scoring output since 2009. His three three-point shots in the game was a career high.

At the age 42 years and 363 days, Haslem became the oldest person to play in the NBA Finals when he entered the fourth quarter of Game 3 of the NBA Finals with 29.8 seconds remaining, breaking the mark of 42 years, 58 days set by Kareem Abdul-Jabbar in 1989. After the Heat lost the NBA Finals to the Denver Nuggets in five games, Haslem officially announced his retirement on July 28, 2023. The Heat retired Haslem's No. 40 jersey on January 19, 2024.

== Post-playing career ==
On November 8, 2023, the Heat hired Haslem to hold the role of vice president of basketball development. In 2024, he began working as a television analyst, appearing on NBA TV's postseason panel. Haslem has also made appearances for ESPN.

Haslem joined Prime Video as a studio analyst during the 2025–26 NBA season.

== Other appearances ==
Haslem appeared in the music video for the song "G.D.F.R." by Flo Rida, as well as the music video for "Bet That" by Trick Daddy, and the music video for Born-N-Raised by DJ Khaled, Pitbull, Trick Daddy and Rick Ross.

== Personal life ==
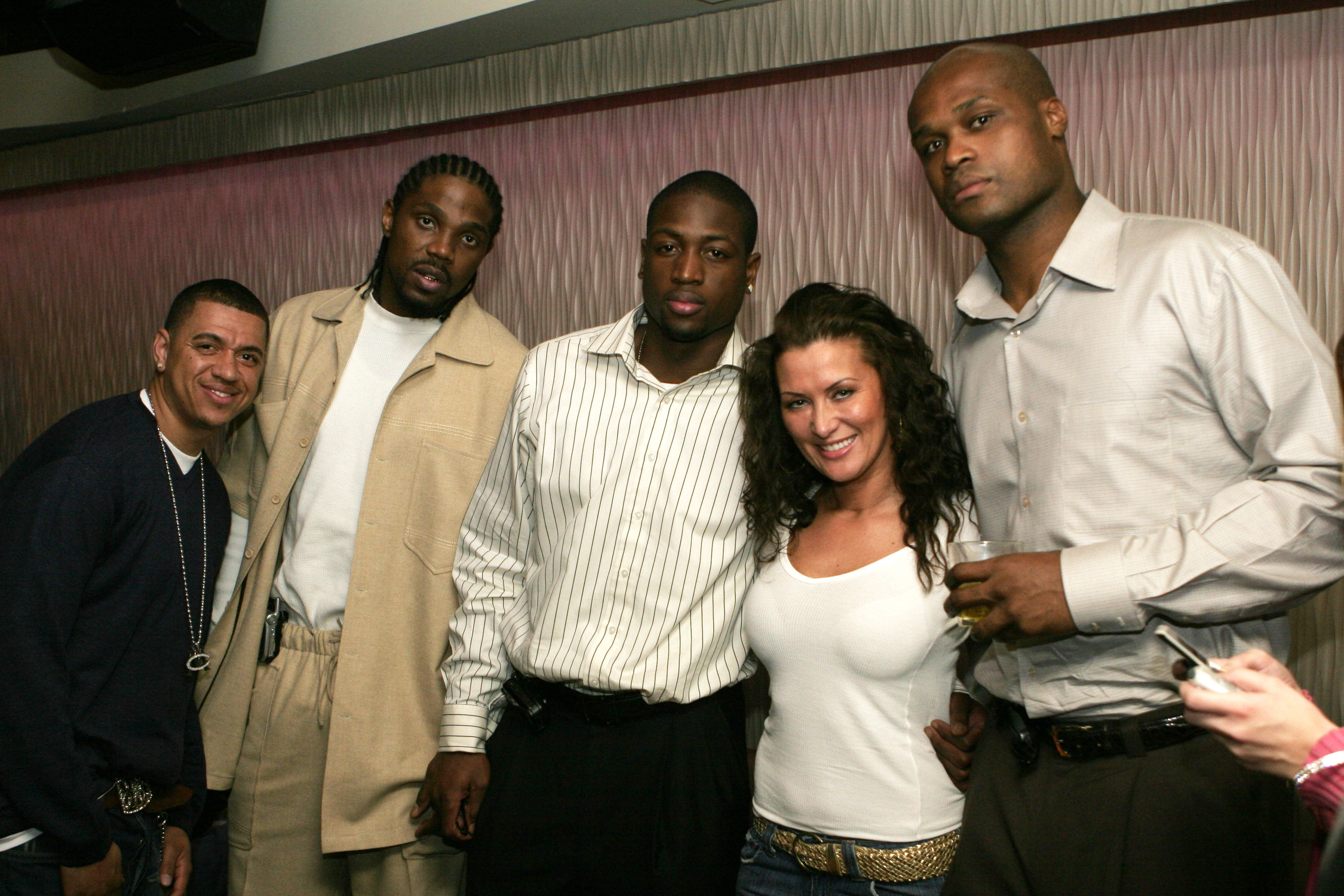
Haslem at a party with Dwyane Wade (center) and Antoine Walker (far right) in December 2005.

Haslem is married to Faith Rein-Haslem, a sports broadcaster he dated for 14 years. They met in 1999 while attending the University of Florida, where she was a member of the Florida Gators track and field team. They have three sons. Haslem also has two brothers and three sisters.

After retirement, Haslem engaged in countless acts of philanthropy under the umbrella of his organization: the Udonis Haslem Children’s Foundation (UD Kids). He also partnered up with Wells Fargo to help repair homes in his area.

Haslem, among other high-profile athletes and celebrities, was a paid spokesperson for FTX, a cryptocurrency exchange. In November 2022, FTX filed for bankruptcy and wiped out billions of dollars in customer funds. Haslem, alongside other spokespeople, was sued for promoting unregistered securities through a class-action lawsuit. In February 2022, the U.S. 11th Circuit Court of Appeals ruled in a lawsuit against Bitconnect that the Securities Act of 1933 extends to targeted solicitation using social media. Haslem settled the FTX case, agreeing to pay an undisclosed amount.

He purchased a minority stake in Ipswich Town F.C. in September of 2025, which was publicly announced in August 2026.

== Career statistics ==
Legend
GP	Games played	GS	Games started	MPG	Minutes per game
FG%	Field goal percentage	3P%	3-point field goal percentage	FT%	Free throw percentage
RPG	Rebounds per game	APG	Assists per game	SPG	Steals per game
BPG	Blocks per game	PPG	Points per game	**Bold**	Career high
†	Won an NBA championship

=== NBA ===
==== Regular season ====
Year	Team	GP	GS	MPG	FG%	3P%	FT%	RPG	APG	SPG	BPG	PPG
2003–04	Miami	75	24	23.9	.459	.000	.765	6.3	.7	.4	.3	7.3
2004–05	Miami	80	**80**	33.4	.540	.000	.791	**9.1**	**1.4**	**.8**	**.5**	10.9
2005–06†	Miami	**81**	**80**	30.8	.508	.000	.789	7.8	1.2	.6	.2	9.3
2006–07	Miami	79	79	31.4	.492	.000	.680	8.3	1.2	.6	.3	10.7
2007–08	Miami	49	48	**36.8**	.467	—	.810	9.0	**1.4**	**.8**	.4	**12.0**
2008–09	Miami	75	75	34.1	.518	—	.753	8.2	1.1	.6	.3	10.6
2009–10	Miami	78	0	27.9	.494	—	.762	8.1	.7	.4	.3	9.9
2010–11	Miami	13	0	26.5	.512	—	.800	8.2	.5	.5	.2	8.0
2011–12†	Miami	64	10	24.8	.423	—	.814	7.3	.7	.5	.4	6.0
2012–13†	Miami	75	59	18.9	.514	—	.711	5.4	.5	.4	.2	3.9
2013–14	Miami	46	18	14.2	.507	—	.568	3.8	.3	.2	.3	3.8
2014–15	Miami	62	25	16.0	.448	.200	.703	4.2	.7	.3	.2	4.2
2015–16	Miami	37	0	7.0	.337	.111	.750	2.0	.4	.1	.1	1.6
2016–17	Miami	16	0	8.1	.478	.000	.600	2.3	.4	.4	.1	1.9
2017–18	Miami	14	0	5.1	.200	.125	.500	.7	.4	.0	.1	.6
2018–19	Miami	10	1	7.4	.333	.000	.750	2.7	.2	.0	.0	2.5
2019–20	Miami	4	1	11.0	.364	**.333**	.750	4.0	.3	.0	.0	3.0
2020–21	Miami	1	0	3.0	**1.000**	—	—	1.0	.0	.0	.0	4.0
2021–22	Miami	13	0	6.4	.452	.250	**1.000**	1.9	.3	.1	.1	2.5
2022–23	Miami	7	1	10.1	.345	**.333**	.800	1.6	.0	.1	.3	3.9
Career		879	501	24.7	.489	.127	.756	6.6	.8	.5	.3	7.5

==== Playoffs ====
Year	Team	GP	GS	MPG	FG%	3P%	FT%	RPG	APG	SPG	BPG	PPG
2004	Miami	13	0	15.3	.394	—	.677	3.4	.2	.4	.2	3.6
2005	Miami	15	15	**36.2**	.491	—	.739	**10.0**	**1.0**	.5	.4	**9.2**
2006†	Miami	**22**	**22**	29.5	.493	.000	.683	7.4	.8	.6	.3	8.6
2007	Miami	4	4	25.8	.480	—	.750	5.3	**1.0**	.3	**.5**	7.5
2009	Miami	7	7	29.1	.543	—	**.900**	8.7	.4	.4	.4	8.4
2010	Miami	5	0	28.4	.351	—	.667	7.4	.8	.2	.2	6.0
2011	Miami	12	0	24.2	.397	—	**.900**	4.5	.8	.5	.3	5.3
2012†	Miami	**22**	11	20.5	.455	—	.743	6.4	.6	.2	.3	4.8
2013†	Miami	**22**	19	16.2	**.593**	—	.571	3.6	.3	**.7**	.2	5.0
2014	Miami	16	6	10.6	.459	—	.600	2.6	.3	.1	.2	2.5
2016	Miami	9	0	9.4	.533	—	.714	3.4	.4	.0	.1	2.3
2023	Miami	2	0	1.5	.000	.000	—	.5	.0	.0	.0	.0
Career		149	84	21.5	.478	.000	.713	5.5	.6	.4	.3	5.6

=== College ===
Year	Team	GP	GS	MPG	FG%	3P%	FT%	RPG	APG	SPG	BPG	PPG
1998–99	Florida	31	—	21.3	**.603**	.000	.592	5.0	.8	.7	.7	10.5
1999–00	Florida	**37**	—	22.4	.579	—	.639	5.1	.9	.8	.8	11.8
2000–01	Florida	31	**31**	28.1	.597	—	**.709**	7.5	1.0	.8	1.0	**16.8**
2001–02	Florida	31	**31**	**28.3**	.562	.000	.694	**8.3**	**1.6**	**.9**	**1.3**	16.0
Career		130	62	24.9	.584	.000	.666	6.4	1.1	.8	.9	13.7

== Records ==
=== Miami Heat ===
==== Regular season ====
- Most rebounds (5,780)
- Most defensive rebounds (4,169)
- Most offensive rebounds (1,611)

==== Playoffs ====
- Most offensive rebounds (230)

== Awards and honors ==
- 3× NBA champion: 2006, 2012, 2013
- NBA All-Rookie Second Team: 2004
- First undrafted player in NBA history to set franchise rebounding record: 2012

== See also ==
- List of Florida Gators in the NBA
- Miami Heat accomplishments and records
- List of NBA seasons played leaders
- List of NBA players who have spent their entire career with one franchise
- List of oldest and youngest NBA players
- List of Puerto Ricans
