= Michael Doleac =

American basketball player-coach (born 1977)

- Doleac in 2007

Personal information
- Born: June 15, 1977 (age 49) San Antonio, Texas, U.S.
- Listed height: 6 ft 11 in (2.11 m)
- Listed weight: 262 lb (119 kg)

Career information
- High school: Central Catholic (Portland, Oregon)
- College: Utah (1994–1998)
- NBA draft: 1998: 1st round, 12th overall pick
- Drafted by: Orlando Magic
- Playing career: 1998–2008
- Position: Power forward / center
- Number: 51

Career history
- 1998–2001: Orlando Magic
- 2001–2002: Cleveland Cavaliers
- 2002–2004: New York Knicks
- 2004: Denver Nuggets
- 2004–2007: Miami Heat
- 2007–2008: Minnesota Timberwolves

Career highlights
- NBA champion (2006); NBA All-Rookie Second Team (1999); 2× First-team All-WAC (1997, 1998)

Career NBA statistics
- Points: 2,882 (4.9 ppg)
- Rebounds: 1,955 (3.3 rpg)
- Assists: 343 (0.6 apg)
- Stats at NBA.com
- Stats at Basketball Reference

Michael Scott Doleac (born June 15, 1977) is an American former professional basketball player.

== Career ==
He graduated from Central Catholic High School in Portland, Oregon in 1994 before going on to play college basketball at the University of Utah. As a senior at Utah, Doleac helped lead the team to the 1998 NCAA National Championship game, in which they lost to the University of Kentucky in Doleac's hometown of San Antonio, Texas. After four years at Utah, he established himself among the program's all-time greats, finishing in the Top 10 in three career statistical categories: 10th in scoring (1,519 points), 8th in rebounds (886) and 4th in free throws made (472).

In 1998, the Orlando Magic drafted Doleac with the 12th pick in the 1st round. As a rookie in 1999, Doleac was named to the NBA All-Rookie Second Team. On the day of the 2001 NBA draft, Doleac was traded from the Magic to the Cleveland Cavaliers for Brendan Haywood, who was then traded to the Washington Wizards for Laron Profit and a future first-round draft pick.

Doleac later played for the New York Knicks from 2002 to 2004, when he was traded to the Atlanta Hawks in a three-team trade. Doleac was waived by the Hawks, and signed with the Denver Nuggets for the remainder of the season. Doleac then played for the Miami Heat from 2004 to 2007, when he was traded to the Minnesota Timberwolves, along with Antoine Walker and Wayne Simien, for Mark Blount and Ricky Davis. The highlight of his career was in 2005–2006, when he won an NBA title with the Miami Heat as the team's backup center behind the Hall of Famer, Shaquille O'Neal.

Doleac retired after a 10-year NBA career after the 2007–2008 NBA season.

After retirement, Doleac returned to the University of Utah initially planning to pursue a medical degree, but switched to studying for his master's degree in physics. In 2009, Doleac became a graduate manager for the University of Utah men's basketball team.

== Personal life ==
Doleac had several songs created for him on ESPN's (now Draft Kings) The Dan Le Batard Show with Stugotz.

== Coaching ==
Doleac taught physics, and coached the boys' varsity basketball team at Park City High School in Park City, Utah.

== NBA career statistics ==
Legend
GP	Games played	GS	Games started	MPG	Minutes per game
FG%	Field goal percentage	3P%	3-point field goal percentage	FT%	Free throw percentage
RPG	Rebounds per game	APG	Assists per game	SPG	Steals per game
BPG	Blocks per game	PPG	Points per game	**Bold**	Career high
†	Won an NBA championship

=== Regular season ===
Year	Team	GP	GS	MPG	FG%	3P%	FT%	RPG	APG	SPG	BPG	PPG
1998–99	Orlando	49	0	15.9	.468	.000	.675	3.0	.4	.4	.3	6.2
1999–00	Orlando	**81**	**29**	16.5	.452	**.500**	.842	**4.1**	**.8**	.4	.4	**7.0**
2000–01	Orlando	77	21	**18.2**	.417	.000	.847	3.5	**.8**	**.5**	.5	6.4
2001–02	Cleveland	42	15	16.8	.417	.000	.826	4.0	.6	.4	.3	4.6
2002–03	New York	75	0	13.9	.426	.000	.783	2.9	.6	.2	.2	4.4
2003–04	New York	46	0	14.9	.444	.000	.861	**4.1**	.7	.4	**.6**	5.0
2003–04	Denver	26	0	13.2	.412	.000	.875	2.9	.5	.2	.2	3.6
2004–05	Miami	80	8	14.7	.447	.000	.610	3.2	.6	.3	.3	4.0
2005–06†	Miami	31	3	12.0	.420	.000	.800	2.7	.3	.3	.2	3.2
2006–07	Miami	56	0	12.5	**.469**	.000	**.878**	2.8	.4	.3	.3	3.6
2007–08	Minnesota	24	8	10.7	.444	.000	.500	2.0	.3	.4	.4	2.4
Career		587	84	15.0	.439	.125	.791	3.3	.6	.3	.3	4.9

=== Playoffs ===
Year	Team	GP	GS	MPG	FG%	3P%	FT%	RPG	APG	SPG	BPG	PPG
1999	Orlando	4	0	10.8	.278	.000	.778	3.0	.0	.0	**.2**	**4.3**
2001	Orlando	4	0	**11.3**	.375	.000	.000	**3.5**	.3	**.8**	.0	3.0
2004	Denver	5	0	9.8	.500	.000	.000	1.4	**.6**	.0	.0	2.0
2005	Miami	**9**	0	7.2	.438	.000	**1.000**	1.6	.0	.1	.1	1.8
2006†	Miami	8	0	9.0	**.538**	.000	**1.000**	2.8	.0	.1	.0	2.0
2007	Miami	1	0	1.0	.000	.000	.000	.0	.0	.0	.0	.0
Career		31	0	8.9	.411	.000	.846	2.2	.1	.2	.1	2.3
