= 2005–06 Detroit Pistons season =

NBA team season

- Division champions
- Head coach: Flip Saunders
- President: Joe Dumars
- General manager: Joe Dumars
- Owner: Bill Davidson
- Arena: The Palace of Auburn Hills

Results
- Record: 64–18 (.780)
- Place: Division: 1st (Central); Conference: 1st (Eastern)
- Playoff finish: Eastern Conference Finals (lost to Heat 2–4)
- Stats at Basketball Reference

Local media
- Television: WMYD; WDIV-TV; FSN Detroit
- Radio: WDFN

The 2005–06 Detroit Pistons season was the 65th season of the franchise, the 58th in the National Basketball Association (NBA), and the 49th in the Detroit area. The team entered the season as the two-time defending Eastern Conference champions. The Pistons began the season hoping to improve upon their 54–28 output from the previous season and have another chance of going to the NBA Finals after losing to the San Antonio Spurs in last season's NBA Finals in seven games. They bested it by ten games, finishing 64–18—their best record in franchise history—and qualifying for the playoff for the fifth straight season. The Pistons defeated the Milwaukee Bucks in five games in the first round, and the Cleveland Cavaliers in a tough, hard-fought seven-game series to reach the Eastern Conference finals for the fourth consecutive year before losing to the eventual NBA champions Miami Heat, whom they had beaten in a seven-game playoff series the year before. Detroit's offseason was soon marked by the departure of star defensive player Ben Wallace, who signed a free-agent deal with the Chicago Bulls.

For the season, the Pistons had a new logo, and, though they kept the uniforms, the horse logo was replaced by the letter 'P' on the left side of the shorts, they added new red road alternate uniforms with blue side panels to their jerseys and shorts, their alternate uniforms remained in used until 2009, while the logo and uniforms lasted until 2017.

Ben Wallace won his fourth and final Defensive Player of the Year Award and he along with Rasheed Wallace, Richard Hamilton, and Chauncey Billups were selected as reserves for the 2006 NBA All-Star Game.

== Draft picks ==
Round	Pick	Player	Position	Nationality	College
1	26	Jason Maxiell	PF	United States	Cincinnati
2	56	Amir Johnson	PF	United States	
2	60	Alex Acker	SG	United States	Pepperdine

== Roster ==
2005–06 Detroit Pistons roster
Players

Pos.	No.	Player	Height	Weight	DOB	From
SG	6	Alex Acker (DL)	6 ft 5 in (1.96 m)	185 lb (84 kg)	1983-01-21	Pepperdine
PG	1	Chauncey Billups	6 ft 3 in (1.91 m)	202 lb (92 kg)	1976-09-25	Colorado
C	13	Kelvin Cato	6 ft 11 in (2.11 m)	255 lb (116 kg)	1974-08-26	Iowa State
C	34	Dale Davis	6 ft 11 in (2.11 m)	252 lb (114 kg)	1969-03-25	Clemson
SG	20	Carlos Delfino	6 ft 6 in (1.98 m)	230 lb (104 kg)	1982-08-29	Argentina
PG	00	Tony Delk	6 ft 1 in (1.85 m)	189 lb (86 kg)	1974-01-28	Kentucky
SG	5	Maurice Evans	6 ft 5 in (1.96 m)	220 lb (100 kg)	1978-11-08	Texas
SG	32	Richard Hamilton	6 ft 7 in (2.01 m)	193 lb (88 kg)	1978-02-14	Connecticut
PG	10	Lindsey Hunter	6 ft 2 in (1.88 m)	195 lb (88 kg)	1970-12-03	Jackson State
SF	25	Amir Johnson (DL)	6 ft 9 in (2.06 m)	240 lb (109 kg)	1987-05-01	Westchester HS (CA)
PF	54	Jason Maxiell	6 ft 7 in (2.01 m)	260 lb (118 kg)	1983-02-18	Cincinnati
PF	24	Antonio McDyess	6 ft 9 in (2.06 m)	245 lb (111 kg)	1974-09-07	Alabama
SF	22	Tayshaun Prince	6 ft 9 in (2.06 m)	215 lb (98 kg)	1980-02-28	Kentucky
C	3	Ben Wallace	6 ft 9 in (2.06 m)	245 lb (111 kg)	1974-09-10	Virginia Union
PF	36	Rasheed Wallace	6 ft 11 in (2.11 m)	230 lb (104 kg)	1974-09-17	North Carolina

Coaches
Head coach
- Flip Saunders
Assistant(s)
- Igor Kokoškov
- Sidney Lowe
- Don Zierden
- Mike Abdenour (trainer)

Legend
- (DP) Unsigned draft pick
- (FA) Free agent
- (S) Suspended
- (DL) On assignment to D-League affiliate
- Injured

Roster
Updated: April 17, 2006

== Regular season ==
=== Season standings ===
Central Division	W	L	PCT	GB	Home	Road	Div
y-Detroit Pistons	64	18	.780	-	37–4	27–14	13–3
x-Cleveland Cavaliers	50	32	.610	14	31–10	19–22	11–5
x-Indiana Pacers	41	41	.500	23	27–14	14–27	6–10
x-Chicago Bulls	41	41	.500	23	21–20	20–21	4–12
x-Milwaukee Bucks	40	42	.488	24	25–16	15–26	6–10

Eastern Conference
#	Team	W	L	PCT	GB
1	z-Detroit Pistons	64	18	.780	-
2	y-Miami Heat	52	30	.634	12
3	y-New Jersey Nets	49	33	.598	15
4	x-Cleveland Cavaliers	50	32	.610	14
5	x-Washington Wizards	42	40	.512	22
6	x-Indiana Pacers	41	41	.500	23
7	x-Chicago Bulls	41	41	.500	23
8	x-Milwaukee Bucks	40	42	.488	24
9	Philadelphia 76ers	38	44	.463	26
10	Orlando Magic	36	46	.439	28
11	Boston Celtics	33	49	.402	31
12	Toronto Raptors	27	55	.329	37
13	Charlotte Bobcats	26	56	.317	38
14	Atlanta Hawks	26	56	.317	38
15	New York Knicks	23	59	.280	41

== Playoffs ==
2006 playoff game log
First Round: 4–1 (home: 3–0; road: 1–1)

Game	Date	Team	Score	High points	High rebounds	High assists	Location Attendance	Series
1	April 23	Milwaukee	W 92–74	Rasheed Wallace (22)	Ben Wallace (17)	Chauncey Billups (7)	The Palace of Auburn Hills; 22,076	1–0
2	April 26	Milwaukee	W 109–98	Tayshaun Prince (22)	Ben Wallace (11)	Richard Hamilton (8)	The Palace of Auburn Hills; 22,076	2–0
3	April 29	@ Milwaukee	L 104–124	Chauncey Billups (26)	Antonio McDyess (8)	Chauncey Billups (6)	Bradley Center; 18,717	2–1
4	May 1	@ Milwaukee	W 109–99	Chauncey Billups (34)	Antonio McDyess (11)	Tayshaun Prince (7)	Bradley Center; 16,296	3–1
5	May 3	Milwaukee	W 122–93	Richard Hamilton (40)	Ben Wallace (14)	Chauncey Billups (8)	The Palace of Auburn Hills; 22,076	4–1

Conference Semifinals: 4–3 (home: 3–1; road: 1–2)

Game	Date	Team	Score	High points	High rebounds	High assists	Location Attendance	Series
1	May 7	Cleveland	W 113–86	Tayshaun Prince (24)	Ben Wallace (11)	Chauncey Billups (10)	The Palace of Auburn Hills; 22,076	1–0
2	May 9	Cleveland	W 97–91	Rasheed Wallace (29)	Ben Wallace (15)	Chauncey Billups (7)	The Palace of Auburn Hills; 22,076	2–0
3	May 13	@ Cleveland	L 77–86	Richard Hamilton (22)	Ben Wallace (13)	Billups, Hamilton (5)	Gund Arena; 20,562	2–1
4	May 15	@ Cleveland	L 72–74	Richard Hamilton (30)	Ben Wallace (10)	Chauncey Billups (7)	Gund Arena; 20,562	2–2
5	May 17	Cleveland	L 84–86	Tayshaun Prince (21)	Ben Wallace (13)	Chauncey Billups (5)	The Palace of Auburn Hills; 22,076	2–3
6	May 19	@ Cleveland	W 84–82	Rasheed Wallace (24)	Ben Wallace (10)	Billups, Wallace (4)	Gund Arena; 20,562	3–3
7	May 21	Cleveland	W 79–61	Tayshaun Prince (20)	Ben Wallace (9)	Billups, Prince (3)	The Palace of Auburn Hills; 22,076	4–3

Conference Finals: 2–4 (home: 2–1; road: 0–3)

Game	Date	Team	Score	High points	High rebounds	High assists	Location Attendance	Series
1	May 23	Miami	L 86–91	Richard Hamilton (22)	Ben Wallace (14)	Chauncey Billups (7)	The Palace of Auburn Hills; 22,076	0–1
2	May 25	Miami	W 92–88	Tayshaun Prince (24)	Ben Wallace (12)	Chauncey Billups (8)	The Palace of Auburn Hills; 22,076	1–1
3	May 27	@ Miami	L 83–98	Chauncey Billups (31)	Rasheed Wallace (10)	Tayshaun Prince (4)	American Airlines Arena; 20,245	1–2
4	May 29	@ Miami	L 78–89	Tayshaun Prince (15)	Ben Wallace (11)	Chauncey Billups (7)	American Airlines Arena; 20,248	1–3
5	May 31	Miami	W 91–78	Tayshaun Prince (29)	Richard Hamilton (10)	Chauncey Billups (10)	The Palace of Auburn Hills; 22,076	2–3
6	June 2	@ Miami	L 78–95	Richard Hamilton (33)	Rasheed Wallace (8)	Chauncey Billups (8)	American Airlines Arena; 20,258	2–4

2006 schedule

== Player statistics ==
Legend
GP	Games played	GS	Games started	MPG	Minutes per game
FG%	Field-goal percentage	3P%	3-point field-goal percentage	FT%	Free-throw percentage
RPG	Rebounds per game	APG	Assists per game	SPG	Steals per game
BPG	Blocks per game	PPG	Points per game

=== Regular season ===
Player	GP	GS	MPG	FG%	3P%	FT%	RPG	APG	SPG	BPG	PPG
Tayshaun Prince	82	82	35.3	.455	.350	.765	4.2	2.3	.8	.5	14.1
Ben Wallace	82	82	35.2	.510	.000	.416	11.3	1.9	1.8	2.2	7.3
Antonio McDyess	82	0	21.1	.509	.000	.557	5.3	1.1	.6	.6	7.8
Chauncey Billups	81	81	36.1	.418	.433	.894	3.1	8.6	.9	.1	18.5
Richard Hamilton	80	80	35.3	.491	.458	.845	3.2	3.4	.7	.2	20.1
Rasheed Wallace	80	80	34.8	.430	.357	.743	6.8	2.3	1.0	1.6	15.1
Maurice Evans	80	1	14.2	.452	.371	.800	2.0	.8	.5	.2	5.0
Carlos Delfino	68	1	10.7	.403	.333	.672	1.7	.6	.3	.2	3.6
Carlos Arroyo^{†}	50	0	12.0	.363	.333	.724	1.4	3.1	.4	.1	3.2
Lindsey Hunter	30	1	11.8	.370	.256	.500	1.3	2.1	.6	.0	2.9
Dale Davis	28	2	6.4	.375	.000	.533	1.9	.2	.0	.3	.9
Jason Maxiell	26	0	6.1	.426		.333	1.1	.1	.2	.2	2.3
Darko Miličić^{†}	25	0	5.6	.515	.000	.375	1.1	.4	.1	.6	1.5
Tony Delk^{†}	23	0	16.4	.444	.426	.720	2.2	1.4	.6	.0	7.8
Alex Acker	5	0	7.0	.250	.200		1.0	.8	.2	.0	1.8
Kelvin Cato^{†}	4	0	8.5	.417			1.8	.5	.0	.5	2.5
Amir Johnson	3	0	13.0	.700	.667	1.000	1.3	1.0	.0	.7	6.7

=== Playoffs ===
Player	GP	GS	MPG	FG%	3P%	FT%	RPG	APG	SPG	BPG	PPG
Tayshaun Prince	18	18	41.4	.459	.457	.829	5.7	3.0	.7	.8	16.4
Chauncey Billups	18	18	39.2	.406	.340	.905	3.4	6.5	1.2	.1	17.9
Richard Hamilton	18	18	38.3	.413	.350	.851	2.9	2.7	.9	.3	20.4
Ben Wallace	18	18	35.7	.465	.000	.273	10.5	1.7	1.3	1.2	4.7
Rasheed Wallace	18	18	34.9	.430	.405	.527	6.3	1.8	.6	.8	14.1
Antonio McDyess	18	0	20.6	.559	.000	.548	6.1	.6	.4	.7	7.6
Lindsey Hunter	18	0	12.1	.333	.318	1.000	1.1	1.6	.8	.1	4.2
Tony Delk	16	0	8.6	.404	.200	.700	1.1	.5	.4	.0	3.0
Maurice Evans	16	0	6.3	.533	.636	.875	.9	.2	.1	.1	3.3
Dale Davis	8	0	4.5	.000		.500	1.1	.1	.0	.0	.3
Carlos Delfino	8	0	4.0	.167	.500	1.000	.5	.3	.1	.0	.6
Kelvin Cato	4	0	3.8	.600			1.8	.0	.0	.0	1.5

- ^{†} Denotes player spent time with another team in the season. Stats reflect time with the Pistons only.

== Awards and records ==
- Ben Wallace, NBA Defensive Player of the Year Award
- Ben Wallace, All-NBA Second Team
- Chauncey Billups, All-NBA Second Team
- Ben Wallace, NBA All-Defensive First Team
- Chauncey Billups, NBA All-Defensive Second Team
- Tayshaun Prince, NBA All-Defensive Second Team
- Ben Wallace, Allstar reserve
- Chauncey Billups, Allstar reserve
- Richard Hamilton, Allstar reserve
- Rasheed Wallace, Allstar reserve
