= Bennett Salvatore =

American basketball referee

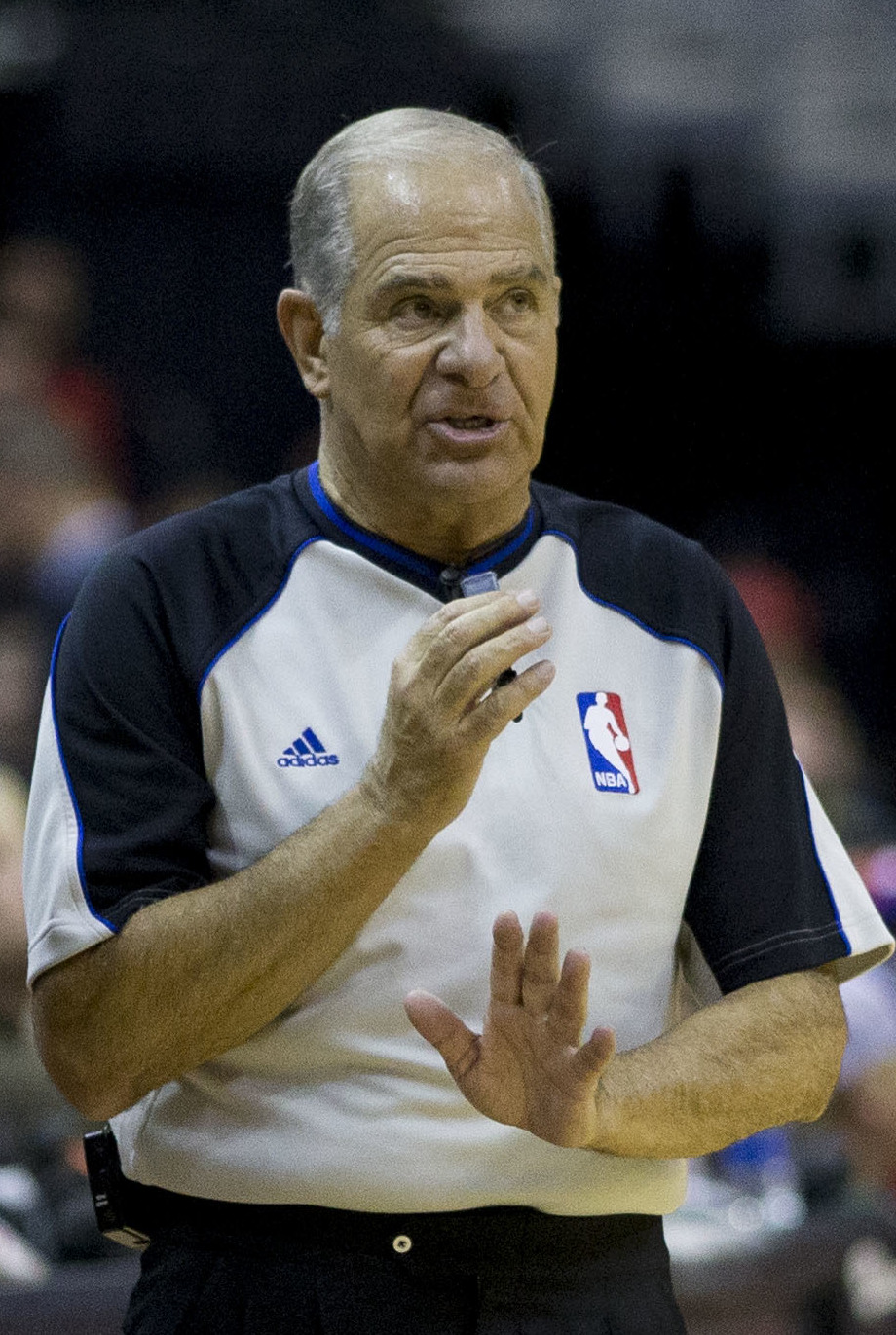
Bennett Salvatore

Bennett Salvatore (born January 9, 1950, in Stamford, Connecticut) is a former professional basketball referee in the National Basketball Association (NBA). At his retirement after the 2014-15 NBA season, Salvatore had officiated 1,520 regular season games.

== Early life ==
Salvatore has lived his entire life in Stamford, Connecticut. He was a two sport athlete in high school, playing baseball and football. He earned All-American and All-State honors as a quarterback in 1967 playing at C.W. Post.

== NBA Referee ==
Salvatore became infamous with NBA fans for a key call against Dirk Nowitzki in Game 5 of the 2006 NBA Finals, after which Dallas owner Mark Cuban held one of the angriest press conferences in NBA history, laying blame on Salvatore for his team's loss.

== Owner ==
Salvatore was the principal owner of Bennett's, a steakhouse in Stamford, Connecticut. One of his most intense athletic rivals in Stamford, and a lifelong friend, is former MLB manager Bobby Valentine. Valentine owns a competing restaurant in Stamford.

On October 8, 2010, Salvatore closed the doors on Bennett's, choosing to retire from his career as a restaurant owner.

== Income tax fraud ==
In 2000, he was sentenced to a year of probation, 150 hours of community service and a fine of $500 for his role in airline ticket fraud. He pleaded guilty in a New Haven federal court on July 26, 2000, to filing a false tax return with the Internal Revenue Service for the tax year 1993.
