= 2005–06 Indiana Pacers season =

NBA professional basketball team season

- Head coach: Rick Carlisle
- General manager: Larry Bird
- Owner: Herbert Simon
- Arena: Conseco Fieldhouse

Results
- Record: 41–41 (.500)
- Place: Division: 3rd (Central); Conference: 6th (Eastern)
- Playoff finish: First Round (lost to Nets 2–4)
- Stats at Basketball Reference

Local media
- Television: WTTV; FSN Midwest
- Radio: WIBC

The 2005–06 Indiana Pacers season was the 30th season completed by the Indiana Pacers in the National Basketball Association (NBA). This was also the Pacers first since the 1986–87 season that All-Star guard Reggie Miller was not on the roster as he retired following the 2004–05 season.

== Draft Selections ==
Round	Pick	Player	Position	Nationality	School/Club team
1	17	Danny Granger	F	United States	New Mexico
2	46	Erazem Lorbek	F	Slovenia	Climamio Bologna (Italy)

== Season summary ==
In Summer 2005, the Pacers introduced new, completely re-designed jerseys to replace the pinstripe jerseys that they had worn since 1997. However, the pinstripe jerseys continued to be worn through the pre-season, while the new jerseys debuted at the regular season opener, a win against the Orlando Magic on November 2.

The Pacers made a major move for the 2005–06 season by signing Šarūnas Jasikevičius, the floor leader of two-time defending Euroleague champions Maccabi Tel Aviv.

The first game of the 2005–06 season was Ron Artest's first game back with his team after his suspension the previous year for his role in the November 19, 2004, brawl between Pacers players and Pistons fans.

In 2005, the Pacers got off to an average start. On December 10, 2005, Ron Artest told a reporter for the Indianapolis Star that he wanted to be traded, saying "the team would be better off without me". Various Pacers, including Jermaine O'Neal, soon denounced him, as O'Neal did not want to talk about it. On December 12, the Pacers placed Artest on their inactive list and began seeking a trade for the troubled star. On December 16, the NBA fined Ron Artest $10,000 for publicly demanding a trade, which is similar to "degrading the league".

After that, the team had gone on a 9-12 tailspin and was 22-22, a far cry from the beginning where people mentioned that the Pacers would be one of the NBA's elite. On January 24, 2006, it was said that Artest would be traded to the Sacramento Kings for Predrag Stojaković, when the trade was declined suddenly without any explanation. The following day, however, the trade was accepted, and Indiana finally cut ties with the troubled All-Star. On February 1, 2006, they managed to beat the Kobe Bryant-led Lakers, keeping the high-scorer below his average. Jermaine O'Neal was also sidelined with a torn left groin and missed two months. The Pacers finished the season 41-41.

Despite the Artest saga and many key injuries the Pacers made the playoffs for the 14th time in 15 years. They also were the only road team to win Game 1 of a first-round playoff series. However New Jersey won game 2 to tie the series at 1-1 heading back to Indiana. In game 3 Jermaine O'Neal scored 37 points as the Pacers regained a 2–1 series lead. The Nets, however, won games four and five to take a 3–2 series lead. In Game 6 Anthony Johnson scored 40 points but the Pacers' season came to an end as the Nets won 96–90. The 2005–06 season was the last time the Indiana Pacers qualified for the NBA playoffs until the 2010–11 NBA season.

On March 30, during a game against the Phoenix Suns, the Pacers organization honored Reggie Miller by retiring his #31 jersey, and presenting him with a Bentley Continental GT. Miller had spent his entire 18-year career with the Pacers and had retired following the 2004–05 season.

== Regular season ==
=== Season standings ===
Central Division	W	L	PCT	GB	Home	Road	Div
y-Detroit Pistons	64	18	.780	-	37–4	27–14	13–3
x-Cleveland Cavaliers	50	32	.610	14	31–10	19–22	11–5
x-Indiana Pacers	41	41	.500	23	27–14	14–27	6–10
x-Chicago Bulls	41	41	.500	23	21–20	20–21	4–12
x-Milwaukee Bucks	40	42	.488	24	25–16	15–26	6–10

Eastern Conference
#	Team	W	L	PCT	GB
1	z-Detroit Pistons	64	18	.780	-
2	y-Miami Heat	52	30	.634	12
3	y-New Jersey Nets	49	33	.598	15
4	x-Cleveland Cavaliers	50	32	.610	14
5	x-Washington Wizards	42	40	.512	22
6	x-Indiana Pacers	41	41	.500	23
7	x-Chicago Bulls	41	41	.500	23
8	x-Milwaukee Bucks	40	42	.488	24
9	Philadelphia 76ers	38	44	.463	26
10	Orlando Magic	36	46	.439	28
11	Boston Celtics	33	49	.402	31
12	Toronto Raptors	27	55	.329	37
13	Charlotte Bobcats	26	56	.317	38
14	Atlanta Hawks	26	56	.317	38
15	New York Knicks	23	59	.280	41

== Roster ==
2005–06 Indiana Pacers roster
Players

Pos.	No.	Player	Height	Weight	DOB	From
SF	24	Jonathan Bender	6 ft 11 in (2.11 m)	202 lb (92 kg)	1981-01-30	Picayune Memorial HS (MS)
PF	44	Austin Croshere	6 ft 9 in (2.06 m)	235 lb (107 kg)	1975-05-01	Providence
C	10	Jeff Foster	6 ft 11 in (2.11 m)	250 lb (113 kg)	1977-01-16	Texas State
PG	4	Eddie Gill	6 ft 0 in (1.83 m)	190 lb (86 kg)	1978-08-16	Weber State
SF	33	Danny Granger	6 ft 8 in (2.03 m)	228 lb (103 kg)	1983-04-20	New Mexico
C	13	David Harrison	7 ft 0 in (2.13 m)	280 lb (127 kg)	1982-08-15	Colorado
SG	1	Stephen Jackson	6 ft 8 in (2.03 m)	218 lb (99 kg)	1978-04-05	Butler CC
PG	3	Šarūnas Jasikevičius	6 ft 4 in (1.93 m)	195 lb (88 kg)	1976-03-05	Maryland
PG	8	Anthony Johnson	6 ft 3 in (1.91 m)	190 lb (86 kg)	1974-10-02	College of Charleston
SG	20	Fred Jones	6 ft 4 in (1.93 m)	210 lb (95 kg)	1979-03-11	Oregon
PF	7	Jermaine O'Neal	6 ft 11 in (2.11 m)	260 lb (118 kg)	1978-10-13	Eau Claire HS (SC)
C	62	Scot Pollard	6 ft 11 in (2.11 m)	278 lb (126 kg)	1975-02-12	Kansas
SF	16	Peja Stojaković	6 ft 10 in (2.08 m)	229 lb (104 kg)	1977-06-09	Croatia
PG	11	Jamaal Tinsley	6 ft 3 in (1.91 m)	195 lb (88 kg)	1978-02-28	Iowa State

Coaches
Head coach
- Rick Carlisle
Assistant(s)
- Dan Burke
- Chad Forcier
- Kevin O'Neill
- Chuck Person
- Jimmy Powell
- Josh Corbeil (trainer)

Legend
- (DP) Unsigned draft pick
- (FA) Free agent
- (S) Suspended
- (DL) On assignment to D-League affiliate
- Injured

Roster
Updated: January 25, 2006

== Playoffs ==
2006 playoff game log
First Round: 2–4 (home: 1–2; road: 1–2)

Game	Date	Team	Score	High points	High rebounds	High assists	Location Attendance	Series
1	April 23	@ New Jersey	W 90–88	Stephen Jackson (19)	Jeff Foster (9)	Anthony Johnson (6)	Continental Airlines Arena; 18,752	1–0
2	April 25	@ New Jersey	L 75–90	Anthony Johnson (16)	Jeff Foster (9)	Johnson, Jones (4)	Continental Airlines Arena; 18,472	1–1
3	April 27	New Jersey	W 107–95	Jermaine O'Neal (37)	Jermaine O'Neal (15)	Anthony Johnson (8)	Conseco Fieldhouse; 14,706	2–1
4	April 29	New Jersey	L 88–97	Jermaine O'Neal (22)	Danny Granger (8)	three players tied (4)	Conseco Fieldhouse; 16,401	2–2
5	May 2	@ New Jersey	L 86–92	Jermaine O'Neal (19)	Danny Granger (12)	Stephen Jackson (7)	Continental Airlines Arena; 18,804	2–3
6	May 4	New Jersey	L 90–96	Anthony Johnson (40)	Jermaine O'Neal (6)	Anthony Johnson (5)	Conseco Fieldhouse; 16,586	2–4

2006 schedule

== Player statistics ==
=== Regular season ===
Player	POS	GP	GS	MP	REB	AST	STL	BLK	PTS	MPG	RPG	APG	SPG	BPG	PPG
Stephen Jackson	SG	81	81	2,910	312	225	104	43	1,329	35.9	3.9	2.8	1.3	.5	16.4
Danny Granger	SF	78	17	1,765	384	90	58	62	587	22.6	4.9	1.2	.7	.8	7.5
Anthony Johnson	PG	75	53	1,981	168	324	63	22	691	26.4	2.2	4.3	.8	.3	9.2
Šarūnas Jasikevičius	PG	75	15	1,557	153	227	40	4	547	20.8	2.0	3.0	.5	.1	7.3
Fred Jones	SG	68	2	1,837	170	154	55	20	651	27.0	2.5	2.3	.8	.3	9.6
David Harrison	C	67	17	1,034	254	14	23	59	385	15.4	3.8	.2	.3	.9	5.7
Jeff Foster	C	63	37	1,581	574	50	41	27	372	25.1	9.1	.8	.7	.4	5.9
Jermaine O'Neal	PF	51	47	1,802	476	133	27	117	1,024	35.3	9.3	2.6	.5	2.3	20.1
Austin Croshere	PF	50	26	1,148	265	62	22	7	408	23.0	5.3	1.2	.4	.1	8.2
Scot Pollard	C	45	32	771	218	24	37	20	169	17.1	4.8	.5	.8	.4	3.8
Jamaal Tinsley	PG	42	27	1,122	133	211	49	6	390	26.7	3.2	5.0	1.2	.1	9.3
Eddie Gill	PG	41	0	122	15	12	11	1	45	3.0	.4	.3	.3	.0	1.1
Peja Stojaković^{†}	SF	40	40	1,454	250	68	26	8	779	36.4	6.3	1.7	.7	.2	19.5
Ron Artest^{†}	SF	16	16	603	78	35	42	11	310	37.7	4.9	2.2	2.6	.7	19.4
Samaki Walker	PF	7	0	22	3	0	0	1	2	3.1	.4	.0	.0	.1	.3
Jonathan Bender	SF	2	0	21	4	2	0	1	10	10.5	2.0	1.0	.0	.5	5.0

- ^{†} Denotes player spent time with another team in the season. Stats reflect time with the Pacers only.

=== Playoffs ===
Player	POS	GP	GS	MP	REB	AST	STL	BLK	PTS	MPG	RPG	APG	SPG	BPG	PPG
Anthony Johnson	PG	6	6	242	30	31	6	0	120	40.3	5.0	5.2	1.0	.0	20.0
Stephen Jackson	SG	6	6	227	27	20	4	1	80	37.8	4.5	3.3	.7	.2	13.3
Jermaine O'Neal	PF	6	6	216	45	10	3	14	126	36.0	7.5	1.7	.5	2.3	21.0
Danny Granger	SF	6	3	162	31	10	4	7	49	27.0	5.2	1.7	.7	1.2	8.2
Austin Croshere	PF	6	2	175	22	7	5	0	49	29.2	3.7	1.2	.8	.0	8.2
Fred Jones	SG	6	1	167	20	15	6	1	47	27.8	3.3	2.5	1.0	.2	7.8
Šarūnas Jasikevičius	PG	6	0	66	6	6	0	1	17	11.0	1.0	1.0	.0	.2	2.8
David Harrison	C	6	0	31	5	0	1	1	13	5.2	.8	.0	.2	.2	2.2
Jeff Foster	C	4	4	80	24	3	4	1	11	20.0	6.0	.8	1.0	.3	2.8
Scot Pollard	C	4	0	15	5	0	1	0	0	3.8	1.3	.0	.3	.0	.0
Peja Stojaković	SF	2	2	51	9	4	1	1	22	25.5	4.5	2.0	.5	.5	11.0
Eddie Gill	PG	2	0	1	0	0	0	0	0	.5	.0	.0	.0	.0	.0
Jamaal Tinsley	PG	1	0	7	0	1	1	0	2	7.0	.0	1.0	1.0	.0	2.0

== Awards and records ==
- Jermaine O'Neal, NBA All-Star Game
- Ron Artest, NBA All-Defensive First Team
- Danny Granger, NBA All-Rookie Second Team

== Roster changes ==
=== Additions ===
Player	Acquired	Former team	Position
Danny Granger	Draft selection	rookie	SF
Šarūnas Jasikevičius	Signed as free agent	Maccabi Tel Aviv	PG
Predrag Stojaković	Trade	Sacramento Kings	SF
Samaki Walker	Signed as free agent	Washington Wizards	PF

=== Subtractions ===
Player	Departed	New team	Position
Ron Artest	Trade	Sacramento Kings	SF
Michael Curry	Retired	none	SG
Dale Davis	Signed as free agent	Detroit Pistons	C
John Edwards	Signed as free agent	Atlanta Hawks	C
Tremaine Fowlkes	Contract expired	none	SF
Marcus Haislip	Contract expired	none	PF
Britton Johnsen	Contract expired	none	SF
James Jones	Trade	Phoenix Suns	SF
Reggie Miller	Retired	none	SG
