= Comitatus =

Comitatus may refer to:

- Comitatus (warband), a Germanic warband who follow a leader
- Comitatus, the office of a Roman or early Frankish comes, translated as count.
- Comitatus, translated as county, a territory such as governed by medieval counts.
- Comitatus (Kingdom of Hungary), counties in the Kingdom of Hungary
- Comitatenses, armies of the late Roman Empire
- Posse comitatus (disambiguation), various meanings

== See also ==
- Retinue, a body of persons "retained" in the service of a noble or royal person
