= Phil Jackson =

American basketball player, coach and executive (born 1945)

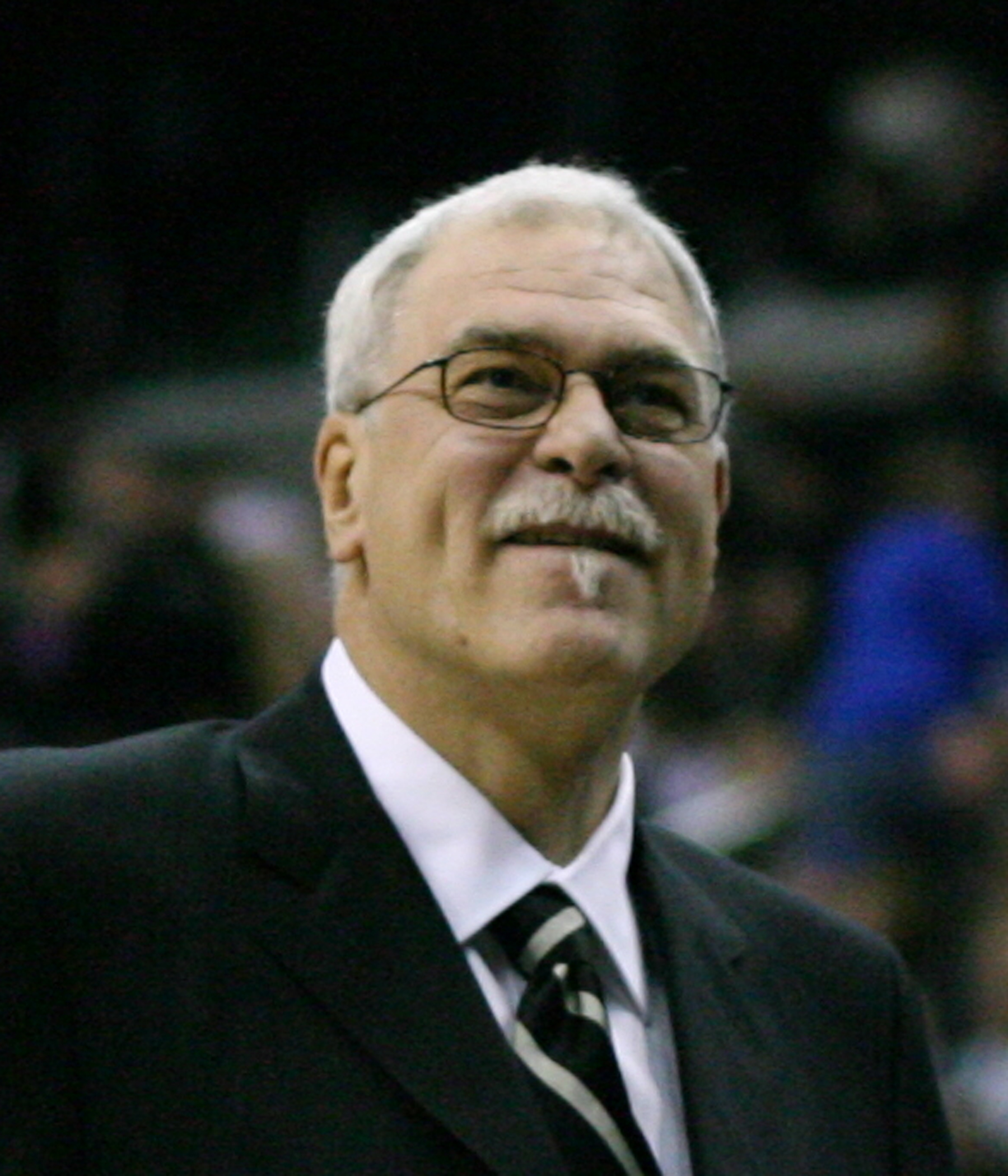
- Jackson in 2009

Personal information
- Born: September 17, 1945 (age 81) Deer Lodge, Montana, U.S.
- Listed height: 6 ft 8 in (2.03 m)
- Listed weight: 220 lb (100 kg)

Career information
- High school: Williston (Williston, North Dakota)
- College: North Dakota (1964–1967)
- NBA draft: 1967: 2nd round, 17th overall pick
- Drafted by: New York Knicks
- Playing career: 1967–1980
- Position: Power forward
- Number: 18, 17
- Coaching career: 1978–2011

Career history

Playing
- 1967–1978: New York Knicks
- 1978–1980: New Jersey Nets

Coaching
- 1978–1981: New Jersey Nets (assistant)
- 1983–1987: Albany Patroons
- 1984: Piratas de Quebradillas
- 1984–1986: Gallitos de Isabela
- 1987: Piratas de Quebradillas
- 1987–1989: Chicago Bulls (assistant)
- 1989–1998: Chicago Bulls
- 1999–2004, 2005–2011: Los Angeles Lakers

Career highlights
- As player: 2× NBA champion (1970, 1973); NBA All-Rookie First Team (1968); 2× First-team Division II All-American (1966, 1967); 2× NCC Player of the Year (1966, 1967); 3× First-team All-NCC (1965–1967); As head coach: 11× NBA champion (1991–1993, 1996–1998, 2000–2002, 2009, 2010); 4× NBA All-Star Game head coach (1992, 1996, 2000, 2009); NBA Coach of the Year (1996); Top 10 Coaches in NBA History; Top 15 Coaches in NBA History; CBA champion (1984); CBA Coach of the Year (1985)

Career NBA playing statistics
- Points: 5,428 (6.7 ppg)
- Rebounds: 3,454 (4.3 rpg)
- Assists: 898 (1.1 apg)
- Stats at NBA.com
- Stats at Basketball Reference

Career coaching record
- NBA: 1,155–485 (.704)
- Record at Basketball Reference
- Basketball Hall of Fame

Philip Douglas Jackson (born September 17, 1945) is an American former professional basketball player, coach, and executive in the National Basketball Association (NBA). Jackson is a 13-time NBA champion, having won two as a player and eleven as a head coach. His eleven championships as a head coach are the most in NBA history. In 2007, Jackson was inducted into the Basketball Hall of Fame, and was named one of the ten greatest coaches in league history in 1996. He holds numerous other records as a coach, including the most postseason wins (229), and most conference titles (13).

Jackson played college basketball for the North Dakota Fighting Sioux (now known as the Fighting Hawks) for three years. He was selected in the 1967 NBA draft by the New York Knicks, with whom he won two NBA titles as a player. After playing thirteen seasons in the league, he began coaching in minor basketball leagues for five years before he was hired as the assistant coach for the Chicago Bulls in 1987.

Jackson was later promoted to head coach of the Bulls in 1989, and he helped the team win six championships (1991–1993, 1996–1998). In 1999, Jackson was hired as a head coach of the Los Angeles Lakers, and he coached the team to three consecutive titles from 2000 to 2002. Following the Lakers' loss to the Detroit Pistons in the 2004 NBA Finals, he took a season off from coaching and returned to the Lakers in 2005, winning two more championships (2009, 2010) before his retirement in 2011. He later was team president of the New York Knicks, where he began his playing career, from 2014 to 2017.

Jackson is known for his use of Tex Winter's triangle offense as well as a holistic approach to coaching that was influenced by Eastern philosophy, garnering him the nickname "Zen Master". Jackson cited Robert Pirsig's book Zen and the Art of Motorcycle Maintenance as one of the major guiding forces in his life. He also applied Native American spiritual practices as documented in his book Sacred Hoops. He is the author of several candid books about his teams and his basketball strategies.

== Early life ==
Jackson was born in Deer Lodge, Montana, on September 17, 1945. His parents, Charles and Elisabeth Funk Jackson, were Assemblies of God ministers. Elisabeth came from a long line of German Mennonites before her conversion to the Assemblies of God. In the churches that they served, his father, Charles, generally preached on Sunday mornings and his mother on Sunday evenings. Eventually, his father became a ministerial supervisor. Phil, his two brothers, and his half-sister grew up in a remote area of Montana in an austere environment, in which no dancing or television was allowed. Jackson did not see his first movie until he was a senior in high school, and went to a dance for the first time in college. Growing up, he assumed he would become a minister.

Jackson attended high school in Williston, North Dakota, where he played varsity basketball and led the team to a state title. He also played football, was a pitcher on the baseball team, and threw the discus in track and field competitions. The high school now has a sports complex named after him. His brother Chuck speculated years later that the three Jackson sons threw themselves passionately into athletics because it was the only time they were allowed to do what other children were doing. Jackson attracted the attention of several baseball scouts. Their notes found their way to future NBA coach Bill Fitch, who had previously coached baseball, and had been doing some scouting for the Milwaukee Braves. Fitch took over as head basketball coach at the University of North Dakota in the spring of 1962, during Jackson's junior year of high school.

== College career ==
Bill Fitch successfully recruited Jackson to the University of North Dakota, where he was a member of the Sigma Alpha Epsilon fraternity. Jackson did well there, helping the Fighting Sioux to third- and fourth-place finishes in the NCAA Division II tournament in his sophomore and junior years (1965 and 1966). Both years, they were beaten by the Southern Illinois Salukis. Jackson's future Knicks teammate Walt Frazier was the Salukis' biggest star, but the two only faced off in 1965, as Frazier was academically ineligible in 1966.

== Professional playing career ==
=== New York Knicks (1967–1978) ===
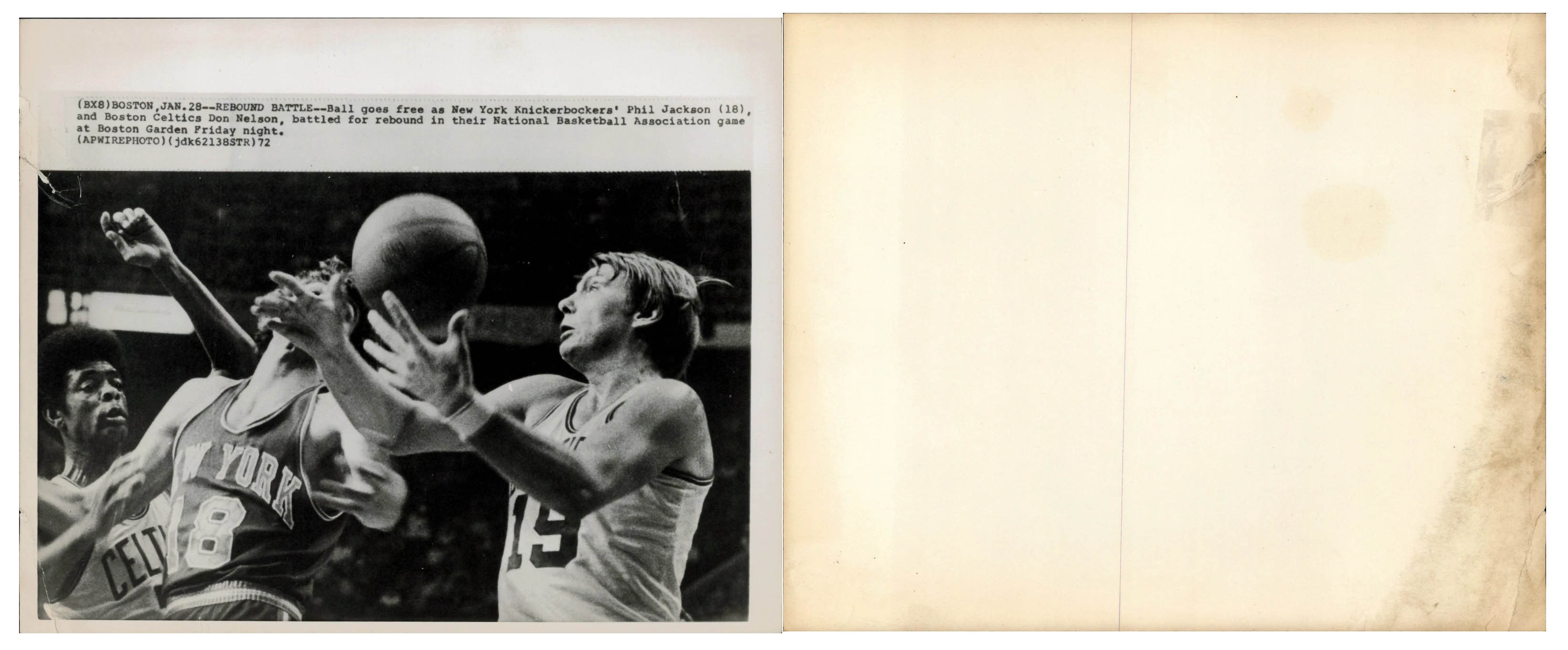
Jackson battling Celtics' Don Nelson for rebound at Boston Garden in 1972

In 1967, Jackson was drafted in the second round by the New York Knicks. While he was a good all-around athlete, with unusually long arms, he was limited offensively but compensated with intelligence and hard work on defense. Jackson eventually established himself as a fan favorite and one of the NBA's leading substitutes, although he had very little playing time. He was a top reserve on the Knicks team that won the NBA title in 1973. Jackson did not play during New York's 1969–70 championship season due to spinal fusion surgery; however, he authored a book entitled Take It All, a photo diary of the Knicks' 1970 championship run.

Soon after the 1973 title, several key starters retired, creating an opening for Jackson in the starting lineup. In the 1974–75 NBA season, Jackson and the Milwaukee Bucks' Bob Dandridge shared the lead for total personal fouls, with 330 each. Jackson lived in Leonia, New Jersey, during this time.

=== New Jersey Nets (1978–1980) ===
After crossing the Hudson in 1978 to play two seasons for the New Jersey Nets, Jackson retired as a player after the 1979–80 NBA season.

== Coaching career ==
=== CBA and Puerto Rico (1983–1987) ===
In the years following the end of his playing career, Jackson began his head coaching career in the Continental Basketball Association (CBA) and Puerto Rico's Baloncesto Superior Nacional (BSN).

After his playing retirement, Jackson moved to his summer home near Glacier National Park in Montana. He was slated to lead the basketball program at nearby Flathead Valley Community College but it was dissolved due to a lack of funds.

On January 26, 1983, Jackson was appointed as head coach for the Albany Patroons of the CBA. He replaced Dean Meminger, his former teammate on the Knicks. Jackson decided to coach in the CBA over college basketball because he considered it as better preparation for coaching in the NBA. Jackson won his first coaching championship with the Patroons, leading them to their first title in 1984. He was named the CBA Coach of the Year in 1985.

In Puerto Rico, he coached the Piratas de Quebradillas (1984 and 1987) and the Gallitos de Isabela (1984–1986). He regularly sought NBA jobs, but was turned down. Jackson had acquired a reputation for being sympathetic to the counterculture during his playing years, which may have scared off potential NBA employers.

=== Chicago Bulls (1987–1998) ===
On October 10, 1987, Jackson was hired as an assistant coach by the Chicago Bulls under Doug Collins. He was promoted to head coach after Collins was fired in 1989. It was around this time that he met Tex Winter and became a devotee of Winter's triangle offense.

Over nine seasons, Jackson and the Bulls made the playoffs every year and won six championships, winning three straight championships over separate three-year periods.

After losing to the Detroit Pistons in the 1990 conference finals, Jackson convinced Michael Jordan to adopt Winter's triangle offense in order to counter the Pistons' Jordan Rules defensive strategy, and the Bulls swept the Pistons in the 1991 conference finals, enroute to defeating the Los Angeles Lakers in the NBA Finals. Two more championships followed, against the Portland Trail Blazers in 1992 and Phoenix Suns in 1993. The "three-peat" was the first since the Boston Celtics won eight titles in a row from 1959 through 1966. Jordan's first retirement after the 1992–1993 season marked the end of the first "three-peat". In 1994, Jackson's Bulls faced the New York Knicks in the playoffs for the fourth consecutive time (the third straight time that Jackson faced off against Pat Riley who had been Knicks head coach since the 1991-92 season); this time the Knicks won in seven games in the conference semi-finals. The physical defense of the Knicks against the Bulls' superstars Jordan and Scottie Pippen during the 1992 playoffs had led to a feud between Jackson and Riley regarding the officiating and the Knicks' rough style of play.

Although Jordan returned just before the 1995 playoffs, it was not enough to prevent a playoff elimination by the Orlando Magic at the conference semi-finals. For 1995-96, the revamped Bulls featured only Jordan and Scottie Pippen as the returning players from the 1991-93 "three-peat", plus the controversial trade for Dennis Rodman. Nonetheless, the Bulls set a regular season record of 72-10 before sweeping the Orlando Magic in the Eastern Conference Finals and then winning their fourth title over the Seattle SuperSonics in six games. The Bulls won their fifth and sixth titles over the Utah Jazz in 1997 and 1998, respectively, although the 1997-98 roster was aging and plagued by injuries to starters Pippen and Steve Kerr. The Bulls also twice defeated the Miami Heat coached by Pat Riley, in 1996 first round playoffs and 1997 Eastern Conference Finals, en route to their championship wins. In the 1998 Eastern Conference Finals, the Bulls needed seven games to overcome the Indiana Pacers led by first-year head coach Larry Bird.

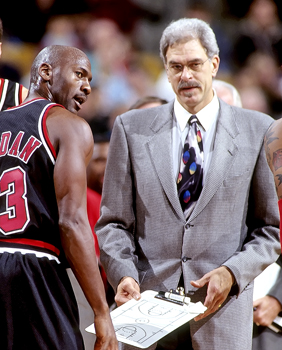
Michael Jordan and Jackson in 1997

Despite the Bulls' success, tension between Jackson and Bulls general manager Jerry Krause grew. Some believed that Krause felt under-recognized for building a championship team and believed that Jackson was indebted to him for giving him his first NBA coaching job. In the summer of 1997, Jackson was not invited to the wedding of Krause's stepdaughter, although all of the Bulls' assistant coaches were, as was Tim Floyd, then head coach at Iowa State, Jackson's eventual successor. After contentious negotiations, in which Jordan intervened saying that he would not play for any other head coach, Jackson received a one-year contract extension only for the 1997–98 season. Krause publicly portrayed Jackson as a two-faced character who had very little regard for his assistant coaches. Ultimately the final decision was up to team owner Jerry Reinsdorf, who offered Jackson the opportunity to return as head coach for 1998-99, but made it clear that the team would have to go into a rebuild because other than Jordan, the rest of the players were at the end of the productive years and they would be too expensive to re-sign. Jackson refused by saying that he didn't want to coach a bad team and left after his contract expired. After the Bulls' final title of the Jordan era in 1998, Jackson left the team vowing never to coach again.

=== Los Angeles Lakers (1999–2004, 2005–2011) ===
After taking a year off, Jackson decided to give coaching another chance with the Los Angeles Lakers in 1999, taking over as head coach from Kurt Rambis who stayed on as assistant coach and assistant general manager.

Jackson took over a talented Lakers team and immediately produced results as he had done in Chicago. In his first year in Los Angeles, the Lakers went 67–15 during the regular season to top the league. Reaching the conference finals, they eliminated the Portland Trail Blazers in a tough seven-game series and then won the 2000 NBA championship by beating the Indiana Pacers, the latter coached by Larry Bird who would step down after that series.

With the duo of Shaquille O'Neal and Kobe Bryant, the supporting cast of Glen Rice, Derek Fisher, Rick Fox, Devean George, A.C. Green, Robert Horry, and Brian Shaw, and the assistance of former Bulls Horace Grant, Ron Harper, and John Salley, Jackson led the Lakers to two additional titles in 2001 and 2002, against the Philadelphia 76ers and New Jersey Nets, adding up to his third three-peat as head coach. The main challenge the Lakers faced was from their conference rival, the Sacramento Kings.

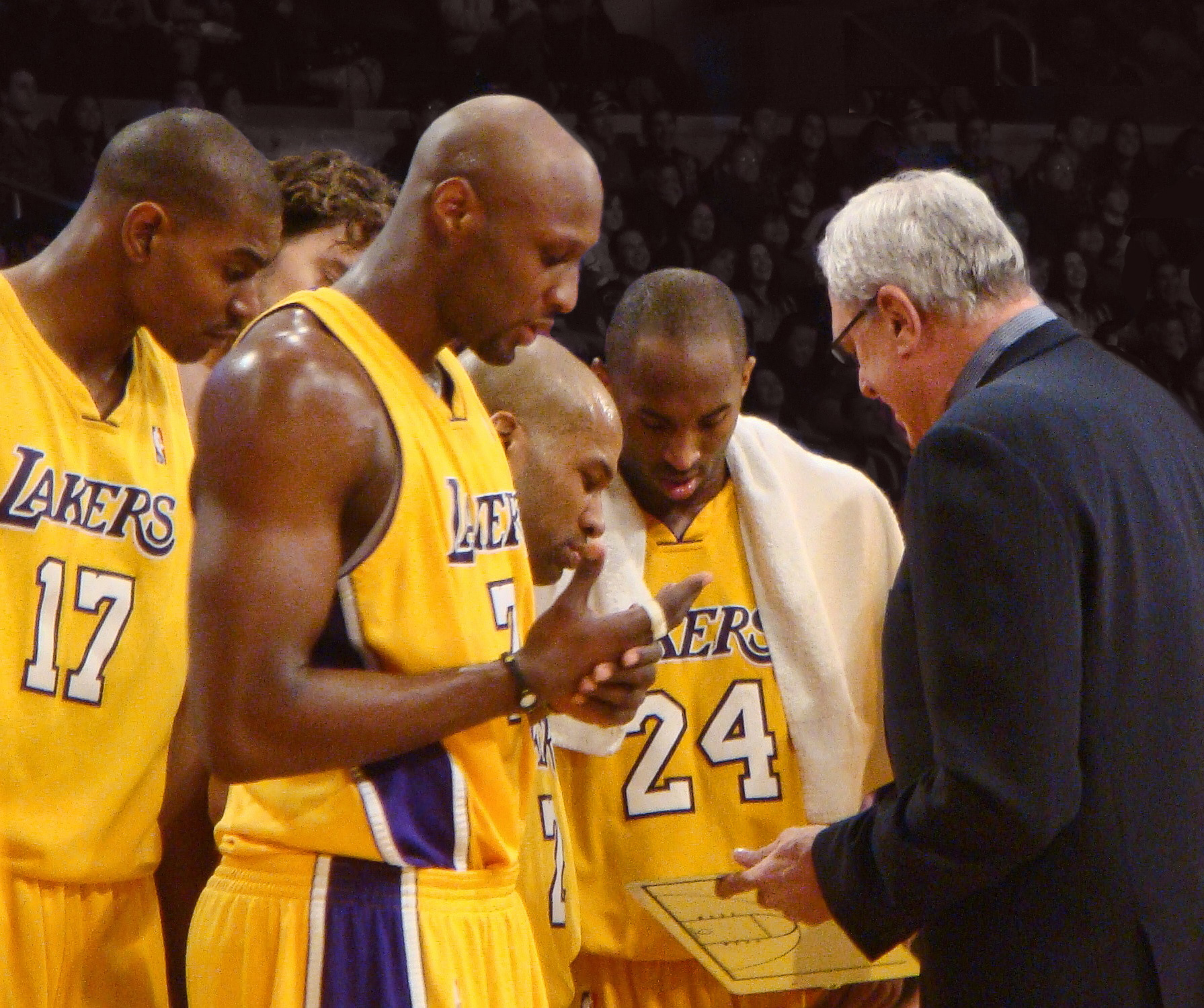
Phil Jackson coaching the Lakers

However, injuries, weak bench play, and public tension between Bryant and O'Neal slowed the team down, and they were beaten in the second round of the 2003 NBA Playoffs by the eventual champion San Antonio Spurs. Afterward, Jackson clashed frequently with Bryant. While remarkably efficient in Jackson's "triangle offense", Bryant had a personal distaste for Jackson's brand of basketball and subsequently called it "boring". In games, Bryant would often disregard the set offense completely to experiment with his own one-on-one moves, infuriating the normally calm Jackson. Bryant managed to test Jackson's patience enough that the "Zen Master" even demanded that Bryant be traded, although Lakers management rejected the request.

Prior to the 2003–04 season, the Lakers signed NBA star veterans Karl Malone and Gary Payton, who had been franchise players for the Utah Jazz and the Seattle SuperSonics, respectively, leading to predictions by some that the team would finish with the best record in NBA history. But from the first day of training camp, the Lakers were beset by distractions. Bryant's trial for sexual assault, continued public sniping between O'Neal and Bryant, and repeated disputes between Jackson and Bryant all affected the team during the season. Despite these distractions, the Lakers beat the defending champion Spurs en route to advancing to the 2004 NBA Finals and were heavy favorites to regain the title. However, they were upset by the Detroit Pistons, who used their strong defense to dominate the Lakers, winning the title four games to one. This marked the first time in ten attempts as head coach that Jackson had lost in the NBA Finals.

On June 18, 2004, three days after the loss to the Pistons, the Lakers announced that Jackson would leave his position as Lakers coach. Jackson was seeking to double his salary from $6 million to $12 million on his expiring contract. He had a contract offer outstanding from the Lakers, but he had not acted on it. Winter said Jackson announced at the All-Star break that he would not want to return to the Lakers if Bryant returned. Many fans attributed Jackson's departure directly to the wishes of Bryant, as Lakers owner Jerry Buss reportedly sided with Bryant. Jackson, Bryant, and Buss all denied that Bryant had made any explicit demand regarding Jackson. However, O'Neal, upon hearing General Manager Mitch Kupchak's announcement of the team's willingness to trade O'Neal and its intention to keep Bryant, indicated that he felt the franchise was indeed pandering to Bryant's wishes with the departure of Jackson. O'Neal's trade to the Miami Heat was the end of the "Trifecta" that had led the Lakers to three championship titles.

That fall, Jackson released The Last Season, a book that describes his point of view of the tensions that surrounded the 2003–04 Lakers team. The book was pointedly critical of Kobe Bryant.

Without Jackson and O'Neal, the Lakers were forced to become a faster-paced team on the court. Though they achieved some success in the first half of the season, injuries to several players including Kobe Bryant and Lamar Odom forced the team out of contention, going 34–48 in 2004–05 and missing the playoffs for the first time in 11 years. Rudy Tomjanovich, Jackson's successor as coach, resigned midway through the season after coaching just 41 games, citing health issues not related to his past bout with bladder cancer, which immediately led to speculation that the Lakers might bring Jackson back.

On June 15, 2005, preceding the 2005–06 season, the Lakers rehired Jackson. Jackson subsequently led the Lakers to a seventh-seed playoff berth for the 2006 playoffs. Once again promoting the notion of selfless team play embodied by the triangle offense, the team achieved substantial results, especially in the last month of the season. Jackson also worked very seamlessly with Bryant, who had earlier shown his desire to bring Jackson back to the bench. Bryant's regular-season performance won him the league scoring title and made him a finalist in MVP voting. However, the Lakers faced a tough 2006 first-round matchup against the second-seeded Phoenix Suns, who were led by eventual MVP winner Steve Nash. The Lakers jumped out to a 3–1 lead following a dramatic last-second shot by Bryant in overtime to win game four, but the Suns recovered to win the last three and take the series. It was the first time that a Jackson-coached team had failed to reach the second round of the playoffs.

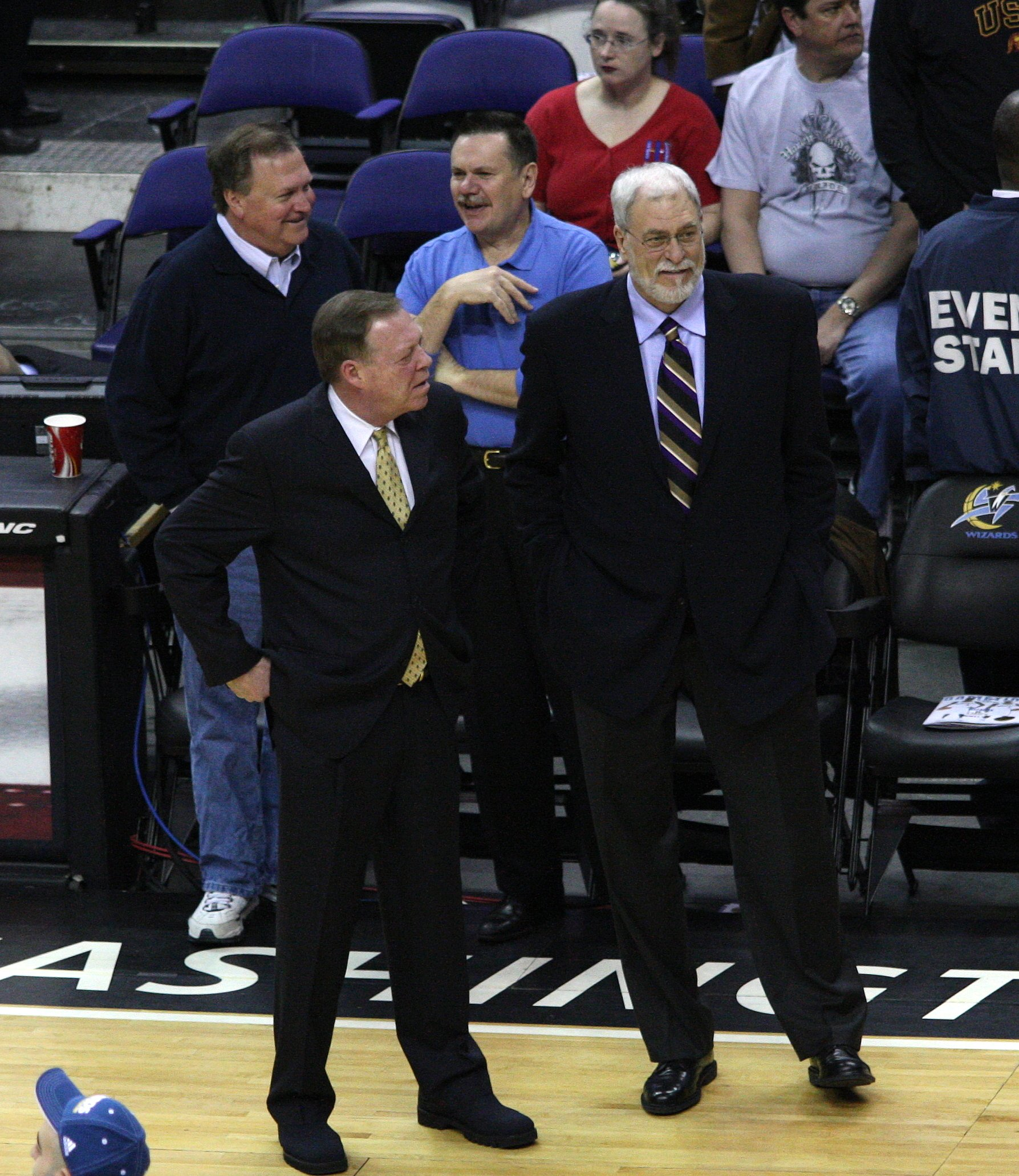
Jackson (right) in 2008, standing next to Lakers assistant coach Frank Hamblen (left)

On January 7, 2007, Jackson won his 900th game, then placing him 9th on the all-time win list for NBA coaches. With this win, Jackson became the fastest to reach 900 career wins, doing so in only 1,264 games and beating Pat Riley's previous record of 900 in 1,278 games.

On December 12, 2007, after announcing he would return to his position as coach just a few days prior, Jackson inked a 2-year contract extension to continue his tenure with the Los Angeles Lakers through the end of the 2009–2010 season.

During the 2007–08 season, the Lakers were able to obtain Pau Gasol in a trade with the Memphis Grizzlies. With another star to pair with Bryant, Jackson coached the Lakers to an appearance in the 2008 NBA Finals against the Boston Celtics. Boston went on to win the series 4–2, in the process handing Jackson and the Lakers their worst playoff loss ever in Game 6, a 39-point defeat. It was only the second time in 11 appearances that Jackson had lost an NBA Finals.

On December 25, 2008, Jackson became the sixth coach to win 1,000 games, with the Lakers defeating the Celtics in their first matchup since the last year's finals. He was the fastest to win 1,000 games, surpassing Riley, who had taken 11 more games than Jackson.

Jackson again coached the Lakers to the NBA Finals in 2009, defeating the Utah Jazz, Houston Rockets, and Denver Nuggets in the process. In the Finals, the Lakers defeated the Orlando Magic 4–1, clinching Jackson's 10th NBA championship as head coach and surpassing the record for most championships won by a head coach previously held by him and Red Auerbach.

Jackson at the exterior of the White House, following the Lakers' 2009 NBA Championship, January 26, 2010

On February 3, 2010, Jackson recorded his 534th win as Lakers head coach, surpassing Pat Riley to become the most successful coach in franchise history. The Lakers would go on to a fifth consecutive playoff berth in 2010. They defeated the Oklahoma City Thunder, Jazz, and Suns in the playoffs before defeating the Celtics in the 2010 NBA Finals, earning Jackson his 11th NBA championship as head coach and his fifth with the Lakers.

On July 1, 2010, Jackson, after giving it tremendous thought and consulting with his doctors over health concerns, announced that he would return to coach the Lakers for the 2010–11 season. On August 2, 2010, Jackson signed a new contract with the Lakers to return for what he mentioned was "his last stand", meaning the 2010–11 season would be his last. In January 2011, he reiterated that it would be his final season, explaining that in the past there was the possibility that maybe he would reconsider. "This year, there's no maybe", said Jackson. He retired after the Lakers were swept out of the playoffs in the conference semifinals by that season's eventual NBA champions, the Dallas Mavericks, meaning that he would not get a fourth three-peat (after previously achieving that feat in 1993, 1998 and 2002). In his final news conference that season, he noted that he did not have much of a relationship with Jerry or Jim Buss, and said, "When I leave here, I don't anticipate Lakers management will call me up and ask my advice."

After the Lakers fired Jackson's successor, Mike Brown, early in the 2012–13 season, they first approached Jackson to replace Brown. Jackson requested two days to consider the opening. He believed the Lakers would wait for his response, but the Lakers thought it was understood they would continue their search. The next day, the team talked with Mike D'Antoni and hired him in a unanimous decision by the front office. They felt D'Antoni's fast-paced style of play made him a "great fit" for the team, more suitable than Jackson's structured triangle offense. Jerry Buss' preference has always been for the Lakers to have a wide-open offense. In the two games leading up to D'Antoni's signing, Lakers fans at Staples Center had chanted "We Want Phil!"

== Executive career ==
=== New York Knicks (2014–2017) ===
In 2014, Jackson was in discussions for months with the New York Knicks regarding an executive position with the team. On March 18, he was introduced as the president of the Knicks after signing a five-year, $60 million contract.

On April 21, 2014, over one week after the conclusion of the season, Mike Woodson and his entire staff were fired by Jackson. The Knicks finished the season with a 37–45 record and finished 9th in the Eastern Conference standings.

On June 9, 2014, the Knicks hired Derek Fisher as the head coach. Fisher had played under Phil Jackson as a Laker and won five championships together.

On June 25, 2014, the Knicks traded guard Raymond Felton along with former NBA Defensive Player of the Year Tyson Chandler to the Dallas Mavericks. In return, the Knicks received Shane Larkin, José Calderón, Samuel Dalembert, and Wayne Ellington along with two picks for the following day's draft. The trade was the first one that he executed as a front office executive. On June 26, as part of the 2014 NBA draft, the Knicks selected Cleanthony Early as the 34th overall pick and Thanasis Antetokounmpo as the 51st overall pick, using the draft picks received in the trade from the Mavericks. The Knicks also acquired Louis Labeyrie, an additional second-round draft pick, after he was traded by the Pacers.

On January 7, 2015, the Knicks set a franchise record with 13 straight losses. The Knicks fell 101–91 to the Washington Wizards, giving New York its longest losing streak in the franchise's 69-year history. This record was extended to 16 straight losses after the NBA Global Games loss against the Milwaukee Bucks in London. They ended the season with a franchise-worst record of 17–65.

On June 25, 2015, the Knicks drafted Latvian Kristaps Porziņģis with the fourth overall pick in the 2015 NBA draft; he signed his rookie-scale contract with the Knicks on July 30, 2015. On that same night, the Knicks traded Tim Hardaway Jr. for the 19th pick in the draft, which would become Jerian Grant. Porziņģis was an NBA All-Rookie First Team selection for the 2016 season.

On November 14, 2016, Jackson was criticized for using the word "posse" to describe Cleveland Cavaliers small forward LeBron James and his business associates during a situation that occurred during James' tenure with the Miami Heat, via ESPN's Jackie MacMullan.

On June 28, 2017, the Knicks officially announced a mutual decision to part ways with Jackson. The speculated reasoning for the parting of ways was Jackson's attempted buying-out of Carmelo Anthony and his very public strife with Porziņģis. Jackson was replaced by his former subordinate Steve Mills, who had previously served as interim president.

== Awards ==
Jackson won the 1996 NBA Coach of the Year Award. In the same year, he was named one of the ten greatest NBA coaches of all time by vote in an unranked compilation. At the time he was in his 8th year coaching; in the seven years prior he coached 574 games and won 414, with only 160 losses, and had a win–loss percentage of 72.1% – the highest of any coach on the list at that time. He continued his success in his later career; cumulative careers in perspective, he retains the highest win–loss percentage of any coach on this list at 70.4% (1155 wins, 485 losses).

In 1994, Jackson was inducted into the National High School Hall of Fame.

In 2002 and 2010 the United States Sports Academy awarded Jackson the Amos Alonzo Stagg Coaching Award.

Jackson is a recipient of the state of North Dakota's Roughrider Award.

== Personal life ==
Jackson has five children and eight grandchildren. He married his first wife, Maxine, in 1967. They divorced in 1972. He married his second wife, June, in 1974, but they divorced in 2000. He dated Jeanie Buss, the daughter of Lakers owner Jerry Buss, whom he met in 1999. The two became engaged in 2013. On December 27, 2016, they announced the termination of their engagement in a joint statement on Twitter.

While he was the coach of the Chicago Bulls, he lived in Bannockburn, Illinois. He lived in Playa del Rey, Los Angeles when he was the coach of the Los Angeles Lakers. While he was the president of basketball operations of the New York Knicks, he lived in Midtown Manhattan, New York City. He currently resides in Flathead Lake, Montana.

He has 26 hours of graduate study in psychology.

Jackson said he has used marijuana and LSD in the past. In 2010, he said he did not believe that prisons should be filled with people prosecuted for marijuana, but called California's Proposition 19, which would have legalized marijuana, poorly written.

Jackson is a Deadhead, a fan of the Grateful Dead, and attended some of their concerts in the 1970s and 1990s.

In a 1990 interview with the Chicago Tribune, Jackson said that he did not care for preachers who browbeat the audience, describing his religious views thusly: "I've always liked the concept of God being beyond anything that the human mind can conceive. I think there is a pantheistic-deistic-American Indian combination religion out there for Americans. That rings true to me."

Jackson was diagnosed with prostate cancer in March 2011. He informed the Lakers players of this in May, when they were involved in a second-round playoff series against the Mavericks. Jackson decided to delay his surgery until after the playoffs.

In 2020, he was a subject of the documentary miniseries The Last Dance, alongside Michael Jordan, Scottie Pippen, Steve Kerr and Dennis Rodman.

In April 2023, Jackson stated that he no longer watches the NBA, saying that it had become too political, saying, "People want to see sports as non-political."

== Career statistics ==
=== Playing career ===
Legend
GP	Games played	GS	Games started	MPG	Minutes per game
FG%	Field goal percentage	3P%	3-point field goal percentage	FT%	Free throw percentage
RPG	Rebounds per game	APG	Assists per game	SPG	Steals per game
BPG	Blocks per game	PPG	Points per game	**Bold**	Career high
†	Won an NBA championship	*	Led the league

==== NBA ====
===== Regular season =====
Year	Team	GP	GS	MPG	FG%	3P%	FT%	RPG	APG	SPG	BPG	PPG
1967–68	New York	75	5	14.6	.400	–	.589	4.5	.7	–	–	6.2
1968–69	New York	47	4	19.7	.429	–	.672	5.2	.9	–	–	7.1
1970–71	New York	71	7	10.8	.449	–	.714	3.4	.4	–	–	4.7
1971–72	New York	80	6	15.9	.440	–	.732	4.1	.9	–	–	7.2
1972–73†	New York	80	4	17.4	.443	–	.790	4.3	1.2	–	–	8.1
1973–74	New York	**82***	21	25.0	.477	–	.776	5.8	1.6	.5	**.8**	**11.1**
1974–75	New York	78	**61**	**29.3**	.455	–	.763	**7.7**	**1.7**	**1.1**	.7	10.8
1975–76	New York	80	3	18.3	.478	–	.733	4.3	1.3	.5	.3	6.0
1976–77	New York	76	2	13.6	.440	–	.718	3.0	1.1	.4	.2	3.4
1977–78	New York	63	0	10.4	.478	–	.768	1.7	.7	.5	.4	2.4
1978–79	New Jersey	59	–	18.1	.475	–	**.819**	3.0	1.4	.8	.4	6.3
1979–80	New Jersey	16	–	12.1	**.630**	.000	.700	1.5	.8	.3	.3	4.1
Career		807	113	17.6	.453	.000	.736	4.3	1.1	.6	.4	6.7

===== Playoffs =====
Year	Team	GP	GS	MPG	FG%	3P%	FT%	RPG	APG	SPG	BPG	PPG
1968	New York	6	–	15.0	.286	–	.800	4.2	.3	–	–	4.0
1971	New York	5	–	6.0	.286	–	**1.000**	2.0	.4	–	–	1.8
1972	New York	16*	–	20.0	.475	–	.737	5.1	.9	–	–	9.8
1973†	New York	**17***	–	19.9	**.500**	–	.737	4.2	**1.4**	–	–	8.7
1974	New York	12	–	24.8	.466	–	.900	4.8	1.3	.8	.4	**11.3**
1975	New York	3	–	**26.0**	.476	–	.875	**8.3**	.7	**1.3**	**1.0**	9.0
1978	New York	6	–	8.3	**.500**	–	.667	1.7	.5	.5	.0	2.0
1979	New Jersey	2	–	10.0	.333	–	**1.000**	1.5	.0	.5	.0	2.0
Career		67	–	18.3	.458	–	.782	4.2	.9	.8	.3	7.7

=== Head coaching record ===
Jackson has had a winning record every year as a head coach, and currently has the highest winning percentage of any Hall of Fame coach, and the highest of any NBA coach coaching 500 games or more. Along with his NBA-record 11 championships, he is the only coach to win at least 10 championships in any of North America's major professional sports: the records are respectively 8 titles in the NFL, 9 titles in the NHL and 7 titles in MLB.

At the end of the 2010 season he had the fifth-most wins of any NBA coach, and was one of only six to have over 1,000 wins. Of those six he was the only one who had not coached over 1,900 games, and the only one not included in the top 10 total games coached.

*	Record

Legend
Regular season	G	Games coached	W	Games won	L	Games lost	W–L %	Win–loss %
Playoffs	PG	Playoff games	PW	Playoff wins	PL	Playoff losses	PW–L %	Playoff win–loss %

Team	Year	G	W	L	W–L%	Finish	PG	PW	PL	PW–L%	Result
Chicago	1989–90	82	55	27	.671	2nd in Central	16	10	6	.625	Lost in Conf. Finals
Chicago	1990–91	82	61	21	.744	1st in Central	17	15	2	.882	**Won NBA Championship**
Chicago	1991–92	82	67	15	.817	1st in Central	22	15	7	.682	**Won NBA Championship**
Chicago	1992–93	82	57	25	.695	1st in Central	19	15	4	.789	**Won NBA Championship**
Chicago	1993–94	82	55	27	.671	2nd in Central	10	6	4	.600	Lost in Conf. Semifinals
Chicago	1994–95	82	47	35	.573	3rd in Central	10	5	5	.500	Lost in Conf. Semifinals
Chicago	1995–96	82	72	10	.878	1st in Central	18	15	3	.833	**Won NBA Championship**
Chicago	1996–97	82	69	13	.841	1st in Central	19	15	4	.789	**Won NBA Championship**
Chicago	1997–98	82	62	20	.756	1st in Central	21	15	6	.714	**Won NBA Championship**
L.A. Lakers	1999–00	82	67	15	.817	1st in Pacific	23	15	8	.652	**Won NBA Championship**
L.A. Lakers	2000–01	82	56	26	.683	1st in Pacific	16	15	1	.938	**Won NBA Championship**
L.A. Lakers	2001–02	82	58	24	.707	2nd in Pacific	19	15	4	.789	**Won NBA Championship**
L.A. Lakers	2002–03	82	50	32	.610	2nd in Pacific	12	6	6	.500	Lost in Conf. Semifinals
L.A. Lakers	2003–04	82	56	26	.683	1st in Pacific	22	13	9	.591	Lost in NBA Finals
L.A. Lakers	2005–06	82	45	37	.549	3rd in Pacific	7	3	4	.429	Lost in first round
L.A. Lakers	2006–07	82	42	40	.512	2nd in Pacific	5	1	4	.200	Lost in first round
L.A. Lakers	2007–08	82	57	25	.695	1st in Pacific	21	14	7	.667	Lost in NBA Finals
L.A. Lakers	2008–09	82	65	17	.793	1st in Pacific	23	16	7	.696	**Won NBA Championship**
L.A. Lakers	2009–10	82	57	25	.695	1st in Pacific	23	16	7	.696	**Won NBA Championship**
L.A. Lakers	2010–11	82	57	25	.695	1st in Pacific	10	4	6	.400	Lost in Conf. Semifinals
**Career**		1,640	1,155	485	.704*		333*	229*	104	.688	

== Books ==
- Jackson, Phil; George Kalinsky (1970). Take It All!. New York: Macmillan. ISBN 0020291906.
- Jackson, Phil; Charley Rosen (1975). Maverick: More Than a Game. Chicago: Playboy Press. ISBN 0872234398.
- Jackson, Phil; Hugh Delehanty (1995). Sacred Hoops: Spiritual Lessons of a Hardwood Warrior. New York: Hyperion. ISBN 0786862068.
- Jackson, Phil; Rosen, Charley (2001). More Than a Game. New York: Seven Stories Press. ISBN 9781583220603.
- Jackson, Phil; Michael Arkush (2004). The Last Season: A Team in Search of Its Soul. New York: Penguin Press. ISBN 1594200351.
- Jackson, Phil (2009). The Los Angeles Lakers: 50 Amazing Years in the City of Angels. San Leandro: Time Capsule Press. ISBN 978-0982324202.
- Jackson, Phil (2010). Journey to the Ring: Behind the Scenes with the 2010 NBA Champion Lakers. San Leandro: Time Capsule Press. ISBN 978-0982324226.
- Jackson, Phil (2013). Eleven Rings: The Soul of Success. New York: Penguin Press. ISBN 9781594205118.
- Jackson, Phil; Smith, Sam (2025). Masters of the Game: A Conversational History of the NBA in 75 Legendary Players. New York: Penguin Press. ISBN 9798217060719.

== See also ==
- List of NBA championship head coaches
