= The Last Season =

The Last Season may refer to:

- The Last Season: A Team in Search of Its Soul, a 2004 book by basketball coach Phil Jackson
- The Last Season (1986 film), a 1986 sports drama film directed by Allan King
- The Last Season, a book by Eric Blehm, winner of the 2006 National Outdoor Book Award
- The Last Season, a 2014 documentary film
