= List of most watched United States television broadcasts of 2002 =

The following is a list of most watched United States television broadcasts of 2002.

== Most watched by week ==
Broadcast (primetime only)
Week of	Title	Network	Viewers (in millions)	Ref.
January 7	Survivor	CBS	27.26	
January 14	Friends	NBC	29.24	
January 21	Friends	NBC	22.99	
January 28	Super Bowl XXXVI	Fox	86.80	
February 4	2002 Winter Olympics opening ceremony	NBC	45.56	
February 11	2002 Winter Olympics (Mon)	NBC	31.53	
February 18	2002 Winter Olympics (Thurs)	NBC	43.31	
February 25	CSI: Crime Scene Investigation	CBS	28.74	
March 4	CBS Sunday Movie	CBS	39.00	
March 11	Survivor	CBS	20.46	
March 18	74th Academy Awards	ABC	41.78	
March 25	CSI: Crime Scene Investigation	CBS	25.24	
April 1	ER	NBC	28.51	
April 8	CSI: Crime Scene Investigation	CBS	22.24	
April 15	CSI: Crime Scene Investigation	CBS	22.11	
April 22	ER	NBC	23.78	
April 29	CSI: Crime Scene Investigation	CBS	26.17	
May 6	ER	NBC	28.71	
May 13	Friends	NBC	34.91	
May 20	Everybody Loves Raymond	CBS	20.18	
May 27	Lakers vs. Kings (NBA)	NBC	23.80	
June 3	NBA Finals (Game 3)	NBC	16.21	
June 10	NBA Finals (Game 4)	NBC	16.56	
June 17	CSI: Crime Scene Investigation	CBS	15.01	
June 24	CSI: Crime Scene Investigation	CBS	15.43	
July 1	60 Minutes	CBS	12.51	
July 8	2002 MLB All-Star Game	Fox	14.65	
July 15	CSI: Crime Scene Investigation	CBS	14.14	
July 22	CSI: Crime Scene Investigation	CBS	14.18	
July 29	CSI: Crime Scene Investigation	CBS	15.63	
August 5	CSI: Crime Scene Investigation	CBS	14.14	
August 12	Everybody Loves Raymond	CBS	12.98	
August 19	American Idol (Tues)	Fox	15.29	
August 26	American Idol (Wed)	Fox	16.94	
September 2	American Idol (Wed)	Fox	22.77	
September 9	Monday Night Football	ABC	19.08	
September 16	Survivor	CBS	23.05	
2002–03 television season begins
September 23	Friends	NBC	34.01	
September 30	Friends	NBC	28.93	
October 7	CSI: Crime Scene Investigation	CBS	30.73	
October 14	CSI: Crime Scene Investigation	CBS	30.81	
October 21	World Series (Game 7)	Fox	30.81	
October 28	CSI: Crime Scene Investigation	CBS	28.95	
November 4	CSI: Crime Scene Investigation	CBS	27.86	
November 11	CSI: Crime Scene Investigation	CBS	29.94	
November 18	Friends	NBC	26.76	
November 25	Everybody Loves Raymond	CBS	20.53	
December 2	CSI: Crime Scene Investigation	CBS	29.74	
December 9	CSI: Crime Scene Investigation	CBS	25.89	
December 16	Survivor	CBS	24.08	
December 23	CSI: Crime Scene Investigation	CBS	21.24	
December 30	Fiesta Bowl	ABC	29.10	
