= Shaq–Kobe feud =

National Basketball Association rivalry between two superstar players

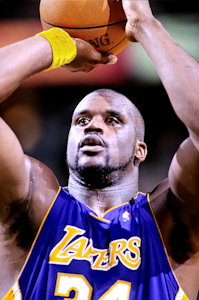
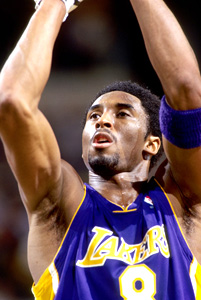
Shaquille O'Neal (left) and Kobe Bryant helped the Lakers win three straight NBA titles. Though they played well together on the court, the pair had an acrimonious relationship at times in the locker room.

The Shaq–Kobe feud was the conflict between National Basketball Association (NBA) players Shaquille O'Neal and Kobe Bryant, who played for the Los Angeles Lakers from 1996–2004.

O'Neal and Bryant won three consecutive NBA championships (2000, 2001, 2002), and appeared in the 2004 NBA Finals. O'Neal was the NBA Finals MVP in each of their victories. After years of arguments over their roles on the Lakers, a trade sent O'Neal to the Miami Heat while Bryant was re-signed as a free agent. Lakers head coach Phil Jackson wrote a 2004 book, The Last Season: A Team in Search of Its Soul, reflecting on Bryant and O'Neal's troubles during their last season together.

== Origins: 1996–1999 ==
=== 1996–1997 ===
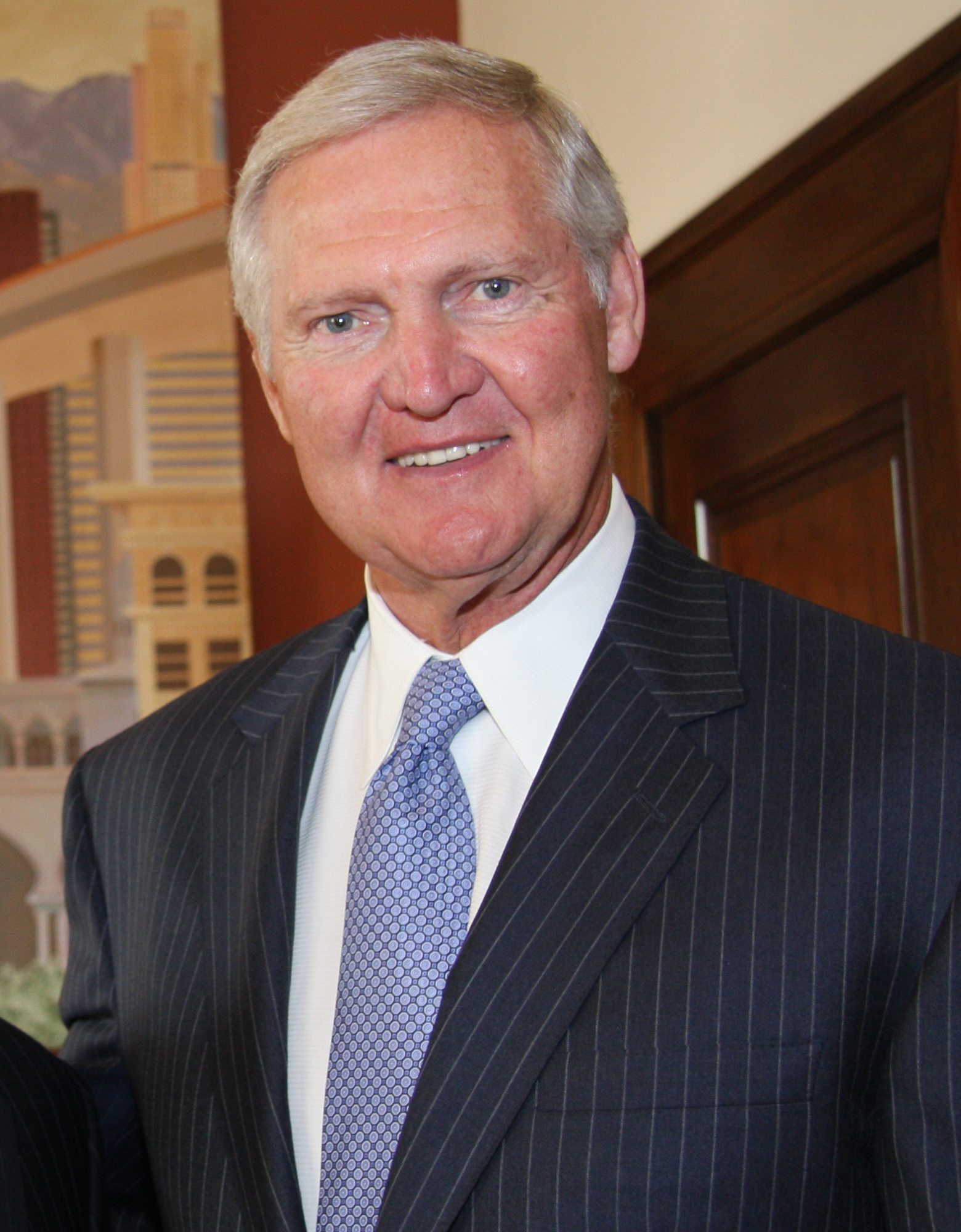
Los Angeles Lakers Hall of Famer and General manager Jerry West brought Bryant and O'Neal to the Lakers in the 1996 offseason.

In 1996, the Los Angeles Lakers of the National Basketball Association (NBA) acquired the draft rights to high school player Kobe Bryant from the Charlotte Hornets by trading established center Vlade Divac. No NBA team had previously drafted a guard straight from high school. After freeing up salary by parting with other veteran players, they signed free agent All-Star center Shaquille O'Neal later that year. The two sparred in their first three seasons playing together from 1996–1999. Bryant kept his teammates at a distance, answering non-basketball questions with one- or two-word responses. O'Neal told the Lakers when Bryant arrived, "I'm not gonna be babysitting." Bryant had extreme confidence in his ability, which was unusual for an 18-year-old, but some teammates interpreted his confidence as arrogance. O'Neal was wary of Bryant, as a rookie, boasting that he would lead the Lakers in scoring and be the best player in the NBA. Lakers general manager Jerry West criticized O'Neal's leadership for hazing Bryant that season. While O'Neal's personality was good-humored, Bryant's demeanor was all-business and was interpreted by some teammates as selfishness. O'Neal began calling Bryant showboat because of his flashy offensive moves.

In an overtime playoff loss to the Utah Jazz that eliminated the Lakers, O'Neal fouled out with two minutes remaining in regulation. Lakers coach Del Harris designed the Laker offense around the rookie Bryant, who went on to shoot four air balls. Harris explained that Bryant's one-on-one skills made him the best choice. After the game, O'Neal put his arm around Bryant and told him there would be other opportunities. West said the team's shortcoming made O'Neal angry since he was going to be judged by the team's success.

=== 1997–1998 ===
In 1997, Bryant was assigned by the Lakers to play in the NBA Summer League to improve as a team player and learn where to send the ball when he drew double teams. The following season, he was voted as a starter in the 1998 All-Star Game though he was a reserve on the Lakers. The team struggled after the All-Star break, losing seven of their first twelve games, and Bryant had a stretch where he made only 30 of 100 shots. O'Neal wanted a championship immediately, and he did not want to wait for Bryant to mature as a player. Harris thought the NBA and its television broadcaster, NBC, were overexposing Bryant and that he became more of a one-on-one player after the break. Bryant's playing time became reduced. The Lakers were eliminated in the 1998 playoffs in the conference finals after they were swept by the Jazz, 4–0.

=== 1998–1999 ===
In 1998, the team's lockout-shortened 50-game season included the firing of Harris, the interim head coaching stint of Kurt Rambis, and a brief period with Dennis Rodman as a player. During the lockout, O'Neal, Bryant, Derek Fisher, and Corie Blount played a two-on-two basketball game. Bryant was always a physical player during practice, but other players, however, disliked his approach. Fisher said, "That was really the way we all should have been playing. With Kobe's spirit." During the game, O'Neal slapped Bryant. Fisher said neither O'Neal nor Bryant really started it, as they were both being physical.

During the season, the Lakers blamed their problems on what they felt was Bryant's selfish play. At one point, O'Neal pointed at Bryant and told reporters in the locker room, "There's the problem." Bryant's jerseys were outselling O'Neal's in Southern California sporting goods stores, and rumors started that O'Neal was jealous, as he was with Penny Hardaway when they played together for the Orlando Magic. "That's far from the truth,” said Fisher. "All Shaq wants to do is win." Asked if he helped Bryant through his growing pains, O'Neal said, "I try not to help guys out too much. Experience is the best teacher ... Kobe's a great player ... He's a new, up-and-coming kid."

O'Neal thought Rambis favored Bryant. Rambis asked O'Neal, the veteran team leader, to heal the rift and talk to Bryant, to which O'Neal reportedly gave him a "blank, cold stare." The rift between O'Neal and Bryant continued into that year's NBA Playoffs. While the Lakers defeated the Houston Rockets in the first round of the playoffs, they were swept 4–0 by the San Antonio Spurs in the second round.

== Three-peat: 2000–2002 ==
=== 1999–2000 ===
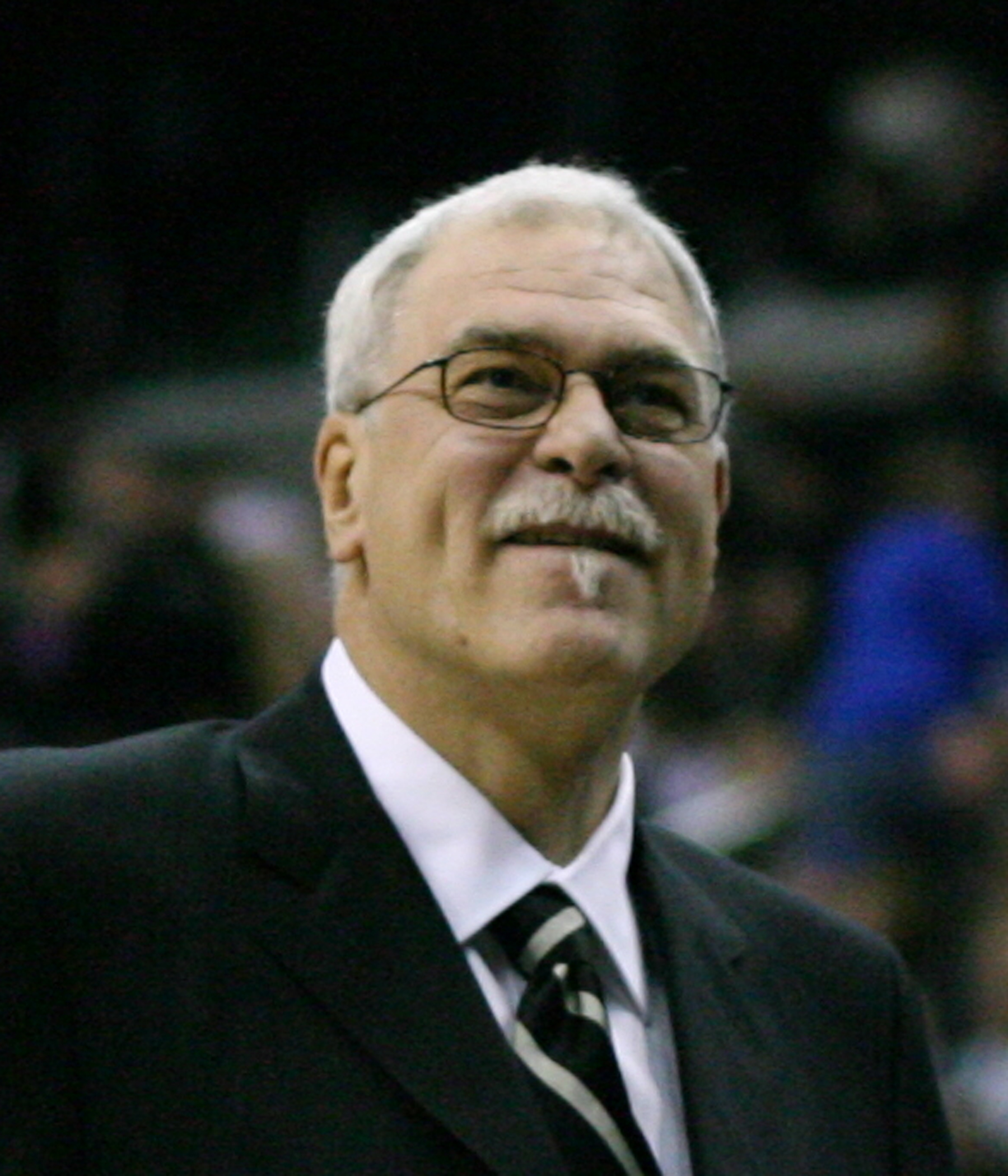
Coach Phil Jackson's arrival led to three consecutive NBA championships for the duo.

During the 1999 offseason, West and Lakers owner Jerry Buss agreed to sign the then six-time NBA champion Phil Jackson to a five-year, $30 million contract to be the team's new head coach entering the 1999–2000 season. Buss was previously a believer in spending conservatively on coaches, but O'Neal and Bryant both encouraged West to hire Jackson. Jackson decided to revolve the offense around O'Neal, who became responsible for distributing the ball. He also wanted better leadership, physical conditioning, and defense from O'Neal.

Jackson chose to develop a close relationship with O'Neal and not Bryant, calculating that O'Neal's personality craved such a relationship. Bryant missed the season's first fifteen games owing to a broken right wrist, allowing the Lakers to focus on O'Neal as Jackson had planned. The results of Jackson's hiring were promising, as the team amassed a 67–15 record (one of the best records in league history). O'Neal led the league in scoring, averaging 29.7 points per game, and he won his first NBA Most Valuable Player Award. During the playoffs, the Lakers fought off the eighth-seeded Sacramento Kings in five games, and then defeated the Phoenix Suns in the second round, four games to one.

It was in the 2000 Western Conference Finals that a defining moment of O'Neal and Bryant's on-court success together occurred. The Lakers were leading the Portland Trail Blazers three games to one, before dropping Game 5 at home and Game 6 in Portland. The Blazers were leading the decisive Game 7 by fifteen points early in the fourth quarter, putting the Lakers on the brink of elimination, before the Lakers mounted a 25–4 rally to take the lead. The comeback run culminated as Bryant drove the lane and threw an alley-oop pass to O'Neal for a one-handed slam dunk after which O'Neal ran upcourt with his mouth agape and both index fingers waving. Bryant extended his hand to O'Neal for a high five, but O'Neal in his celebration did not notice. The Lakers won the game 89–84, and the 13 point comeback after three quarters was the most in a Game 7 in the NBA playoffs. O'Neal had 18 points and 9 rebounds, and Bryant had 25 points, 11 rebounds, 7 assists and 4 blocked shots. The two players complimented each other on the alley-oop play after the game, and assistant coach Tex Winter thought they came to respect each other.

The Lakers went on to defeat the Indiana Pacers in six games and won their first NBA championship since 1988. The Lakers led the series 2–0 behind O'Neal's dominating presence. The Lakers lost Game 3, which Bryant missed with an ankle injury. After O'Neal fouled out in overtime of Game 4, Jackson spread the floor and had Bryant take over the offense and lead the team to victory. Leading 110–109 with 1:32 remaining in Game 6, Jackson again spread the offense—even with O'Neal on the floor—and again allowed Bryant to take over; the Lakers won the game, 116–111, and the championship. In the ensuing celebration, Bryant was the first person to embrace O'Neal.

The season was not without confrontation, as O'Neal in one team meeting said, "I have something to say. I think Kobe is playing too selfishly for us to win." O'Neal felt pressure to be leader of the team and was upset with Bryant's shot selection. Teammate Ron Harper helped mediate the differences between O'Neal and Bryant. According to Jackson, "Kobe didn't have a selfish agenda; he just felt that the way he had been playing was the best way he could contribute. Gradually, he's seen there is a different way to contribute that incorporates more of the team." Upon arriving at the Lakers that season, Winter said he was stunned to discover the level of hatred O'Neal expressed toward Bryant. "There was a lot of hatred in [O'Neal's] heart ... Kobe just took it and kept going." O'Neal regularly expressed to management that he did not believe the team could win a championship with Bryant. Winter observed that O'Neal influenced the entire team against Bryant. Winter thought that Bryant made it a point to get the ball to O'Neal that year, but O'Neal did not appreciate what Bryant was doing to help him. During that season's All-Star Game, Bryant did not participate in the Slam Dunk Contest and a matchup against Vince Carter, following Jackson's request to pass on individual accomplishments to keep the focus on the team. During All-Star warm-ups, O'Neal mimicked Bryant's crossover dribble but threw the ball into the stands to accentuate Bryant's turnovers. O'Neal said it was an inside joke between Kobe and him. Jackson and Winter relied on the triangle offense to heal the relationship between O'Neal and Bryant. The coaches believed that the offense was so structured to smooth over the relationship between the two players on the court. The coaches also told the team they did not see the selfishness in Bryant that the players saw. Winter even put together a video for O'Neal to show that Bryant was playing his role correctly.

=== 2000–2001 ===
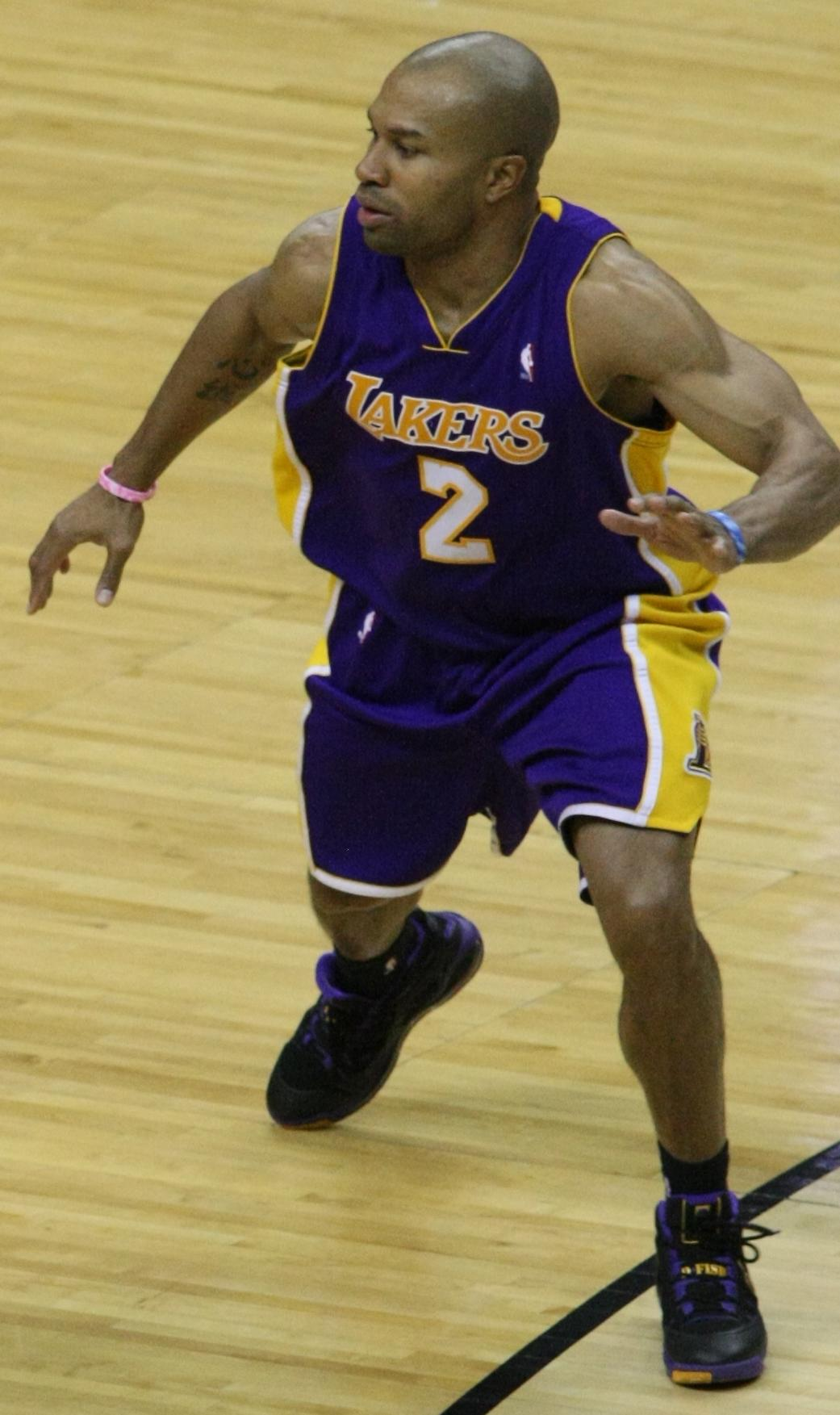
Losing Derek Fisher to injury affected the chemistry between O'Neal and Bryant in 2000–01.

In 2001, the Lakers won the title again; however, O'Neal and Bryant began feuding during the season. O'Neal came into training camp out of shape, which disappointed Jackson and also Bryant, who worked hard over the offseason to improve his game. Bryant was leading the league in scoring as 2001 began, and Jackson said Bryant was playing the best ball of his career. O'Neal was shooting below 50 percent during stretches, and his free throw shooting was in the 20 percent range. O'Neal said of the Lakers in January, "When it was clear that everything went through me, the outcome of it was (a record of) 67–15, playing with enthusiasm, the city jumping up and down and a parade. And now we're 23–11. You figure it out ... I don't know why anybody else would want to change – other than selfish reasons." Bryant responded that it was a different year and the roster had undergone some changes and "things change, things evolve, and you just have to grow with that change." Lakers assistant coach Bill Bertka said a key factor was the team's defense after losing Fisher for most of the season. O'Neal requested a trade after a blowout win against the Phoenix Suns where Bryant scored 38 and O'Neal scored 18. Jackson commented that their actions were "juvenile" and they should appreciate each other and play as a team. Bryant was criticized for forcing his offense and not involving his teammates enough. Even O'Neal's stepfather was overheard yelling at Bryant to pass the ball during a game. Bryant told Jackson that the "(triangle) offense is so simple. It doesn't display my talent ... it doesn't give me what I have to have for my game." According to Bryant, the team's defense was the problem and not his increased role in the offense. Bryant said that "scoring shouldn't affect (O'Neal's) defense", while O'Neal maintained that "if the big dog ain't me, then the house won't get guarded – period." Due to O'Neal's sensitivity toward criticism, Jackson overlooked O'Neal's shortcomings while maintaining his criticism of Bryant. West told O'Neal that he also had personal rivalries when he played with all-time greats Wilt Chamberlain and Elgin Baylor, but O'Neal needed to "stop being a baby ... put the team's success first."

Magic Johnson later noticed a change in O'Neal: "Shaq is saying 'It's me. I'm the one who has to get into shape, I'm the one who has to be ready for the second half run. I'm the one who has to close the middle down like I did last year.' ... He's not blaming everybody else." Fisher returned on March 13, upgrading the team's defense. The Lakers won their last eight games to finish the regular season with 56 wins. O'Neal averaged 33.7 points over the final 11 games. Bryant, upon returning from an injury, was willing to build off of O'Neal now that the center was in shape and playing defense. Bryant played unselfishly in the playoffs. O'Neal referred to Bryant as "[his] idol" and "the best player in the league, by far" following a victory in Game 1 of that year's Western Conference Finals. The Lakers won the championship after a then-historic 15–1 postseason record. After the lone loss, which was in the opening game of the NBA Finals against the Philadelphia 76ers, Jackson criticized O'Neal for his lack of defense. Before the following game, Lakers coach Phil Jackson growled at O'Neal, "Don't be afraid to block a shot!" after O'Neal failed to block a shot in Game 1. O'Neal finished Game 2 with 28 points, 20 rebounds, 9 assists and 8 blocks.

=== 2001–2002 ===
Not much was made public about the feud in the 2001–02 season as the team was set back by injuries, personal tragedies, and national news. O'Neal missed training camp due to surgery on an arthritic toe. He chose not to undergo a more involved surgery that would have kept him out of action for a longer period of time. Still, his toe bothered him throughout the season. Jackson also missed most of camp due to the death of his 94-year-old mother, and Bryant returned to Philadelphia to bury his grandfather. Combined with the September 11 attacks on the World Trade Center, O'Neal said it would be hard for basketball players to be divided by pettiness.

Despite the rocky season, the Lakers won their third consecutive championship, defeating the New Jersey Nets in the Finals by a 4–0 margin. It was the Lakers' first championship sweep in their history, and O'Neal won his third consecutive NBA Finals MVP. Bryant and O'Neal were complimentary of each other afterwards.

== Final years as teammates: 2002–2004 ==
=== 2002–2003 ===
The 2002–03 season began with the three-time defending champions getting off to one of their worst starts. The team was eight games under .500 at 11–19 with their return to the playoffs being questionable. O'Neal was sidelined with hallux rigidus, a degenerative arthritic condition in his toe. O'Neal could have had surgery on his toe early in the summer (which would have allowed him to return to playing sooner), but he decided to wait and have the surgery performed not long before the Lakers' pre-season training camp began. He said, "I got hurt on company time, so I’ll rehab on company time." O'Neal debated whether to have a more invasive surgery that would have kept him out an additional three months, but he opted against the more involved procedure. During the season, Bryant had a nine-game streak where he scored at least 40 points and a 13-game streak where he scored 35 or better. Still, the relationship between O'Neal and Bryant remained peaceful. Jackson ordered Bryant to be more aggressive. The Lakers ended that season with the 5th seed in the Western Conference, failing to get home-court advantage in the first round of the playoffs. They defeated the Minnesota Timberwolves in six games, but were eliminated by eventual champion San Antonio Spurs in the conference semifinals.

=== 2003–2004 ===
The subsequent off-season included accusations and then charges of rape by Bryant in Colorado. On July 16, a little more than two weeks after the initial assault allegations, the Lakers announced the signings of veteran free agents and former All-Stars Karl Malone and Gary Payton, who were recruited by O'Neal. After the signings, the Lakers were widely considered the favorite to win the NBA title.

O'Neal said that the past comments made to the press by him and by Bryant were "almost like a game." They could handle it until the 2003–04 season. Just prior to the season, Bryant privately warned Jackson, "If [O'Neal] starts saying [unreasonable] things in the press, I'll fire back ... I've had it." There were no public indications of animosity between the two since the 2000–2001 season. With Bryant absent from camp due to his legal situation and his recovery from knee surgery, O'Neal said "the full team is here." Later, after sitting out an exhibition game to rest a sore left heel, O'Neal said, "I want to be right [in the regular season] for Derek [Fisher], Karl and Gary." Bryant was again ignored by O'Neal.

When Bryant joined the Lakers in camp, O'Neal told reporters Bryant should look to be more of a passer than a scorer until Bryant's knee was fully healed. Bryant responded that he knew how to play the guard position, and O'Neal should worry about the low post. O'Neal responded, "Just ask Karl and Gary why they came here. One person. Not two. One. Period." O'Neal agreed that Bryant could handle playing guard, but Bryant needed advice on how to play team ball. O'Neal added that he would voice his opinions as he saw fit because the Lakers were his team. He said that if Bryant—who was scheduled to become a free agent at season's end—didn't like what O'Neal had to say, Bryant should just opt out of his contract; O'Neal added, "I ain't going nowhere." Jackson told the team to not discuss the problem further with reporters.

In a subsequent interview with Jim Gray of ESPN, Bryant questioned O'Neal's claims of team leadership. Bryant claimed that O'Neal came into training camp "fat and out of shape", that O'Neal blamed others for the team's defeats, and that O'Neal previously exaggerated the degree to which injuries had affected his game as a cover for simply being out of condition. Bryant criticized O'Neal's public lobbying for a contract extension when "we have two future Hall of Famers (Malone and Payton) playing here pretty much for free". He also criticized O'Neal for only taking responsibility when the team won. He accused O'Neal of threatening not to put forth his best effort if he was not passed the ball more often. Bryant was also upset that O'Neal did not personally contact him amidst his legal troubles in the summer. O'Neal had his bodyguard, Jerome Crawford, call Bryant. "Everyone knows Jerome is me", said O'Neal.

The following day, Lakers scout and former teammate Brian Shaw mediated the conflict between a furious O'Neal and Lakers owner Jerry Buss. Shaw reprimanded O'Neal for yelling "Pay me" at Buss after dunking during a preseason game. Shaw turned to Bryant and told him that Jackson allowed O'Neal time to recover from the physical pounding he endured every season. Bryant, still disappointed at the support he received over the summer, told O'Neal, "You're supposed to be my friend." Shaw questioned why he would believe that when Bryant did not join the team for dinners on the road, failed to attend O'Neal's wedding though invited, and did not invite a single teammate to his own wedding.

Jackson fined Bryant an undisclosed amount for defying his orders to not talk to the press. O'Neal revealed after the season that he promised Malone and Payton he would cease feuding with Bryant in light of his legal situation with the rape charge. On opening night of the season, an injured Bryant sat down next to O'Neal during the Lakers' victory over the Dallas Mavericks. "We put it behind us", Bryant said. "Shaq and I are going to move on, be teammates and help this team to a fourth title."

The Lakers started the season with a 21–3 record, and they received accolades as the greatest NBA team ever. However, the Lakers lost Malone for three months to a knee injury during the winter. During the All-Star break, Buss suspended contract negotiations with Jackson, who was seeking to double his salary from $6 million to $12 million on his expiring contract. Jackson had a contract offer outstanding from the Lakers, but he had not acted on it. The Lakers also suspended talks with O'Neal, who wanted an extension with a pay raise on his remaining three years for $30 million. The Lakers hoped O'Neal would take less money due to his age, physical conditioning, and games missed due to injuries. The Los Angeles Times wrote that both of the Lakers moves were a concession to Bryant. The Lakers slid towards mediocrity during the spring. Injuries hampered Los Angeles, keeping them as the fourth seed in the Western Conference midway through the season. The team never came together defensively. Winter said, "Even though Shaq was a big presence, he was not a great shot blocker. And he didn't like to play the screen and roll, so he put his teammates in jeopardy. He didn't like to help [on defense]." In March, after Bryant received internal criticism about his shot selection, he scored just one point while taking three shots in the first half against Orlando which the Lakers trailed by 11. He scored 37 in the second half and tied a team record with 24 in the fourth quarter as the Lakers won in overtime. Against Sacramento in April, Bryant took just one shot in the first half against tight defense. He finished the game with eight points. An anonymous teammate told the Los Angeles Times, "I don't know how we can forgive him." Afterward, Jackson urged Bryant to be more aggressive offensively.

The Lakers ultimately entered the playoffs as the second seed, thanks to an overtime victory versus the Portland Trail Blazers on the final night of the season, due to a pair of buzzer beaters from Bryant. They defeated the Houston Rockets, the San Antonio Spurs, and the Minnesota Timberwolves before advancing to the 2004 NBA Finals, where they were considered a favorite to defeat the Detroit Pistons. However, after five games, the Lakers found themselves not only defeated but dominated by the Pistons, who won the NBA title. Winter said, "Shaq defeated himself against Detroit. He played way too passively. He had one big game ... He's always interested in being a scorer, but he hasn't had nearly enough concentration on defense and rebounding."

After the loss, the division between O'Neal and Bryant came to a head. At the news conference after the final game, O'Neal addressed the uncertainty around Coach Phil Jackson's now-expired contract, and Bryant's impending free agency, which meant that either or both might not return to the Lakers the next season. With regard to the problem of people possibly leaving the team, O'Neal commented that everyone including him needed to do what was best for themselves.

Eventually Jackson, a favorite of O'Neal, was not offered a new contract by the Lakers. Many sports analysts and spectators assumed that this was because of Bryant, who had at times voiced displeasure with Jackson's offensive scheme. However, Winter said Jackson announced at the All-Star break that he would not want to return to the Lakers if Bryant returned. Buss also longed for the Lakers to return to the fast break offense of Showtime. After learning of Jackson's departure and hearing Lakers general manager Mitch Kupchak say he would consider trading him, O'Neal demanded to be traded. He made it clear that he felt the Laker organization was making moves designed primarily to placate Bryant, saying "The direction they’re going ... I don’t want to be a part of this." Bryant, meanwhile, was involved in discussions with the Los Angeles Clippers. O'Neal's demand was soon indulged, as he was sent to the Miami Heat for Lamar Odom, Caron Butler, Brian Grant, and a first-round draft pick. NBA coach and former player Doc Rivers called the relationship between O'Neal and Bryant the "biggest travesty in sports" because they should have remained teammates and won at least five championships together.

== O'Neal traded from Lakers: 2004–2006 ==
=== 2004–2005 ===
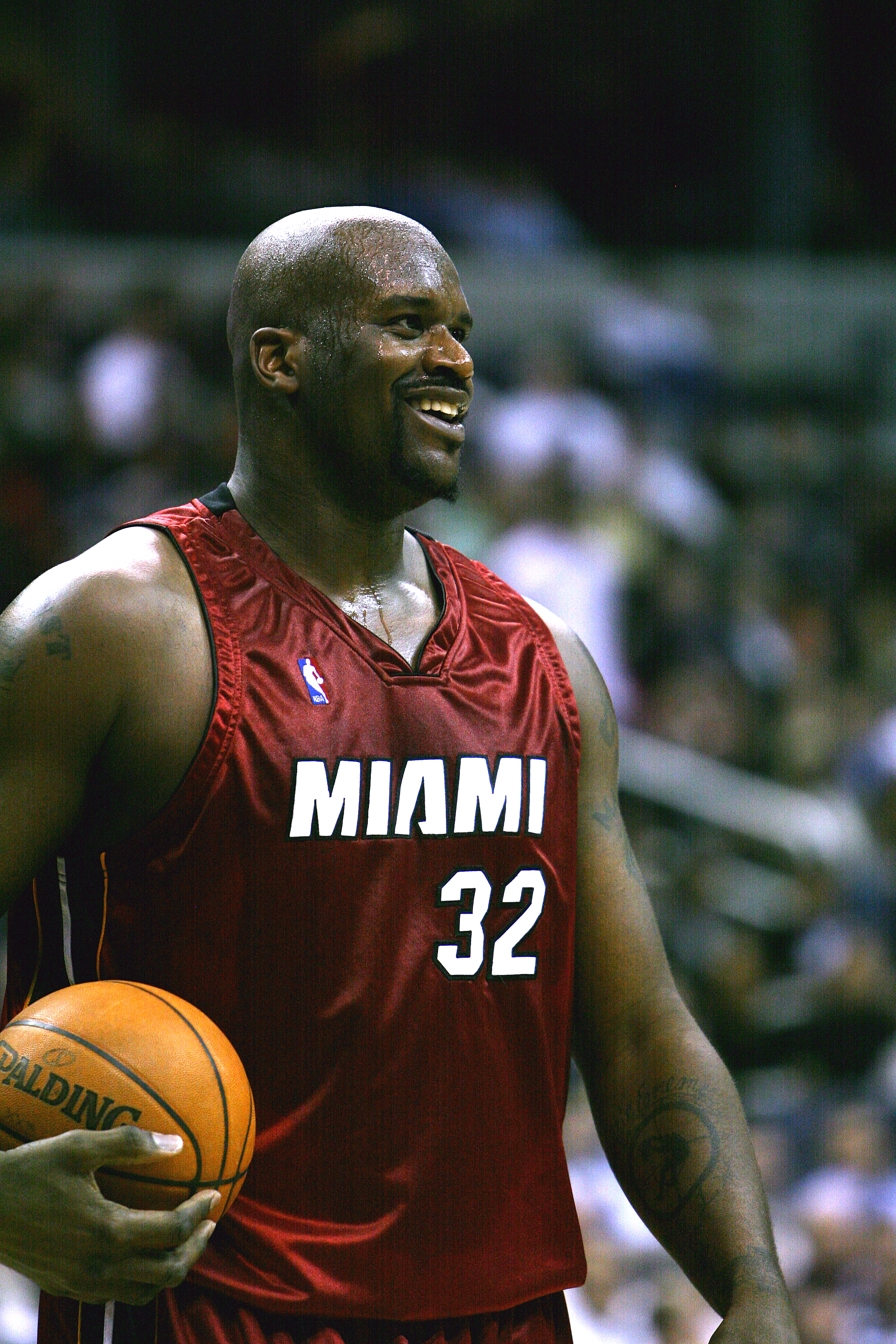
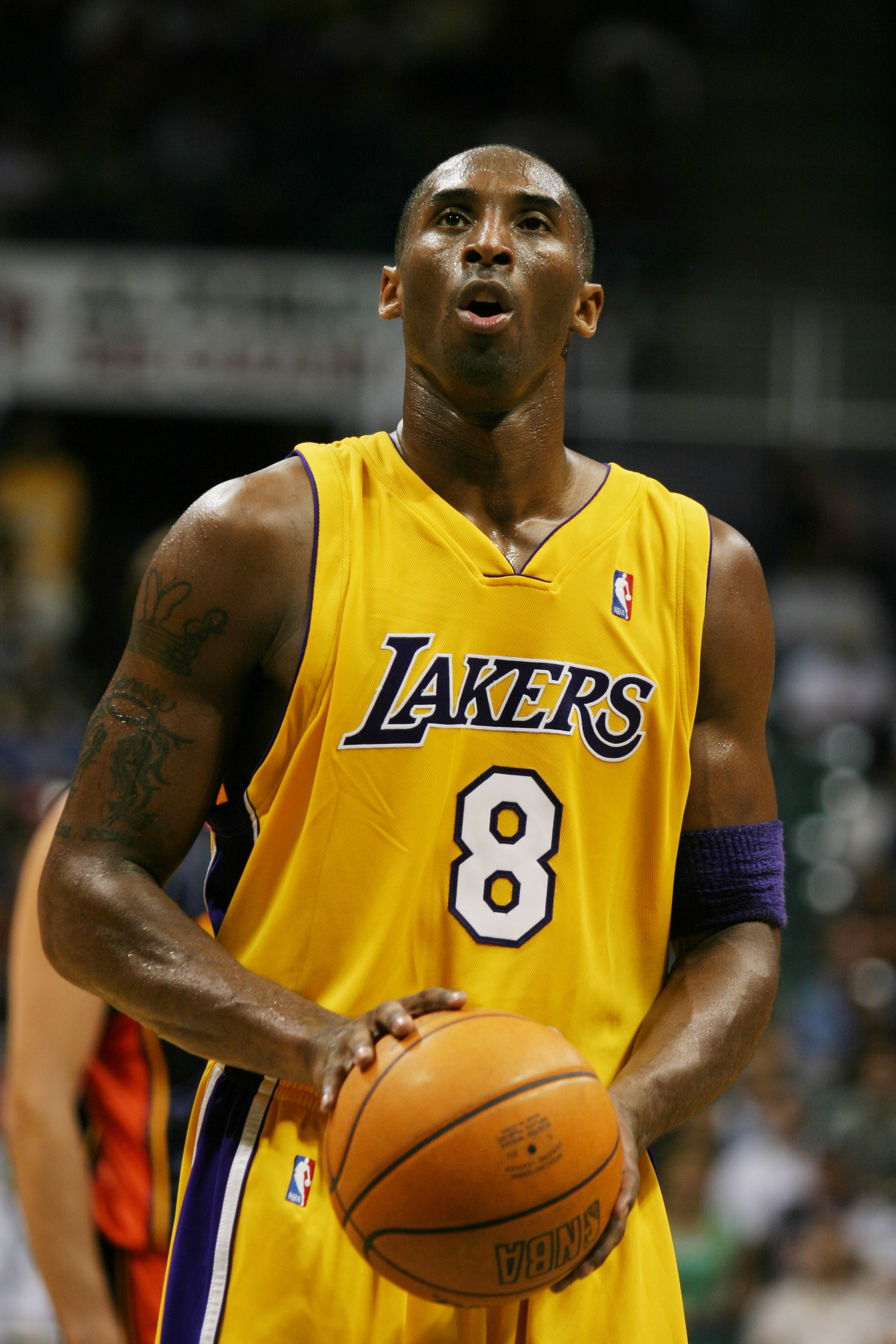
Shaquille O'Neal (left) was traded to the Miami Heat while Kobe Bryant (right) re-signed with the Lakers.

A day after O'Neal was traded, Bryant re-signed with the Lakers for seven years and $136 million. Bryant said he enjoyed playing with both Jackson and O'Neal, and he said he did not influence the Lakers' decisions regarding the two. Regardless, newspapers the next day criticized Bryant for his alleged manipulation of the team. O'Neal added, "When it came to my leaving, [Kobe] could have spoken up. He could have said something. He didn't say anything." Winter said, "[O'Neal] left because he couldn't get what he wanted—a huge pay raise. There was no way ownership could give him what he wanted. Shaq's demands held the franchise hostage, and the way he went about it didn't please the owner too much."

Later, news came out that Bryant made a reference about O'Neal and paying women for their discretion while being questioned by the police in 2003. According to reports, Bryant stated that he should have paid off his women to remain quiet, like O'Neal. Bryant also stated that O'Neal paid women up to US$1 million for their silence about their encounters with him. It also was reported that investigators had told O'Neal of Bryant's supposed statements shortly after the investigation had begun. O'Neal denied these claims, stating that Bryant had no idea about O'Neal's personal business since the two of them rarely spent any time together. O'Neal went as far as to say that he "[wasn't] the one buying love, [Bryant was] the one buying love", a reference to Bryant's purchase of a multi-million dollar diamond ring for his wife in the aftermath of the revelation that Bryant was unfaithful to her.

In August 2004, the NBA scheduled the Lakers and the Heat to play on Christmas Day. The game registered the NBA's highest regular season television ratings since 1998 and held its spot until a 2008 Christmas Day meeting between the Lakers and the Boston Celtics. In the lead-up to the game, O'Neal referred to Bryant as a "Corvette" and himself as a "brick wall" in an interview with ABC's Al Michaels during halftime of Monday Night Football.

Before the opening tip, Bryant and O'Neal did not talk, but did greet each other by bumping forearms. During the game, Bryant was fouled by O'Neal several times but the contacts were not excessive. O'Neal fouled out late in the fourth quarter but the Heat still won the game in overtime, led by up-and-coming star Dwyane Wade. Bryant missed a potentially game-winning shot as time expired. When asked about the brick wall comment, Bryant said, "I knew there was a lot of talk about the brick wall and all that, but I think that was kind of just to hype the game. Hopefully, this is all behind us now." O'Neal shared a similar tone, saying "I'm over it. It's old news to me." Bryant and O'Neal met on the court twice more during the season, once during the NBA All-Star Game and once more when the Lakers played the Heat on March 17, 2005.

=== 2005–2006 ===
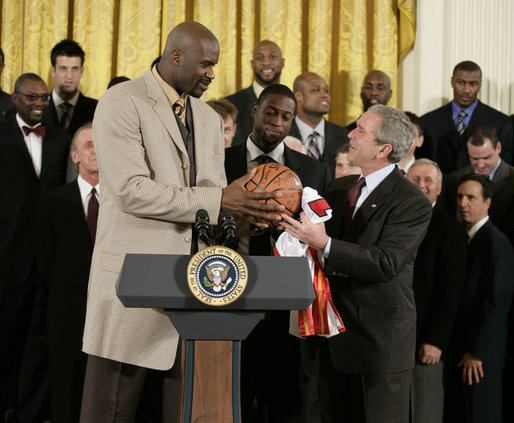
O'Neal with President George W. Bush after his fourth championship.

In the following season, Bryant and O'Neal did not engage in further public attacks. However, hard feelings were apparently still present when they refused to refer to each other by name while talking to the media. The Lakers and the Heat faced off again on Christmas Day in 2005, with the Heat winning the second time. Unlike last year, Bryant and O'Neal did not shake hands nor make eye contact with each other before and after the game. O'Neal said, "It was just another game to me." Bryant said "I wasn't even thinking about it. It is what it is."

Prior to their January 16, 2006 meeting, O'Neal greeted Bryant on the court warmly, a departure from his previous attitude toward Bryant. The two shook hands and hugged before tip-off. After Bryant scored 81 points in a single game against the Toronto Raptors, O'Neal refused to comment to the media about it. O'Neal broke his silence a few weeks later during a media session at the 2006 NBA All-Star Game, when he acknowledged that he watched Bryant's 81-point game and offered praise for the performance. During the All-Star Game itself, the two were seen laughing and joking together. O'Neal and the Heat won the NBA title that season. In his 2011 autobiography, Shaq Uncut: My Story, O'Neal wrote of the championship, "I had proven I could win anywhere—not just with some shot-happy guard in Los Angeles."

O'Neal indirectly referenced the feud in his cameo appearance in the 2006 movie Scary Movie 4. O'Neal is kidnapped in the movie in a Saw parody, and he hears a frightening voice. A terrified O'Neal then asks, "Kobe?"

== De-escalation of the feud: 2006–2011 ==
=== 2006–2007 ===
In 2007, O'Neal said that Bryant should have won the NBA Most Valuable Player Award, which was awarded to Dirk Nowitzki. During the offseason, Bryant was "beyond furious" at reports from a Laker insider that Bryant had insisted O'Neal be traded from the Lakers. Bryant reported that Buss said, "I am not going to re-sign Shaq. I am not about to pay him $30 million a year or $80 million over three years ... His body is breaking down, and I don't want to pay that money to him when I can get value for him right now rather than wait ... It doesn't matter to me what you do in free agency because I do not want to pay [Shaq], period." O'Neal agreed with Bryant: "There's no doubt in my mind Kobe is telling the truth. I believe him a thousand percent ... I would have respected Dr. Buss more as a man if he would have told me that himself, because I know he said it."

=== 2007–2008 ===
In 2008, O'Neal reiterated his belief that Bryant deserved the MVP award. Bryant went on to win the award for the first time in his career that season. During the offseason, O'Neal was at a party, and got up to rap in front of the crowd. O'Neal mentioned Bryant multiple times in the rap, saying that "Kobe couldn't do it without me", referring to Bryant and the Lakers loss in the 2008 NBA Finals to the Boston Celtics. He also rapped, "Kobe, tell me how my ass tastes". During the rap, O'Neal also blamed his divorce on Bryant's comments to investigators in 2004 about O'Neal paying off women. Bryant commented that he "didn't take (O'Neal's rap) any kind of way whatsoever." O'Neal later said he was freestyling and that "it was all done in fun. Nothing serious whatsoever ... I'm totally cool with Kobe. No issue at all." Rap artist Snoop Dogg, a Laker fan, agreed that "Shaq has all access and the right to do and say what he wants to say in fun, in the spirit of rap."

=== 2008–2009 ===
In November of the 2008–09 season, O'Neal told reporters that he believed the entire feud was the Lakers head coach Phil Jackson's fault. O'Neal later retracted the statement and apologized, interrupting one of Jackson's pre-game interviews to give him a hug and a kiss on the cheek. On January 29, 2009, in an interview with Stephen A. Smith, O'Neal claimed that the feud between him and Bryant was simply a marketing ploy, saying "We helped you hype it up. I know what I'm doing, brother. I'm the smartest player in the world." On Bryant, O'Neal claimed that he "always did love Kobe." On Jackson, O'Neal claimed he is "the greatest coach ever, and he's done a lot for me. Phil's my guy. It's all marketing, baby." O'Neal also added that had he stayed with the Lakers, he and Bryant would have won another three or four titles. "We're still the greatest little-man, big-man 1-2 punch ever created in the history of the game", O'Neal said. At the 2009 NBA All-Star Game, O'Neal, Bryant, and Jackson were all reunited on the West squad. O'Neal and Bryant were both named co-MVPs for the game and were shown laughing and hugging during the game. O'Neal told Bryant to keep the MVP trophy, but Bryant instead gave it to O'Neal's son. For O'Neal, Bryant's gesture marked a turning point in their relationship. Bryant and the Lakers faced the Orlando Magic in the 2009 NBA Finals, winning the series in five games. Shaq showed support for Kobe, on his Twitter page saying: "thats right i am saying it today and today only, i want kobe bryant to get number 4, spread da word [sic]".

=== 2009–2010 ===
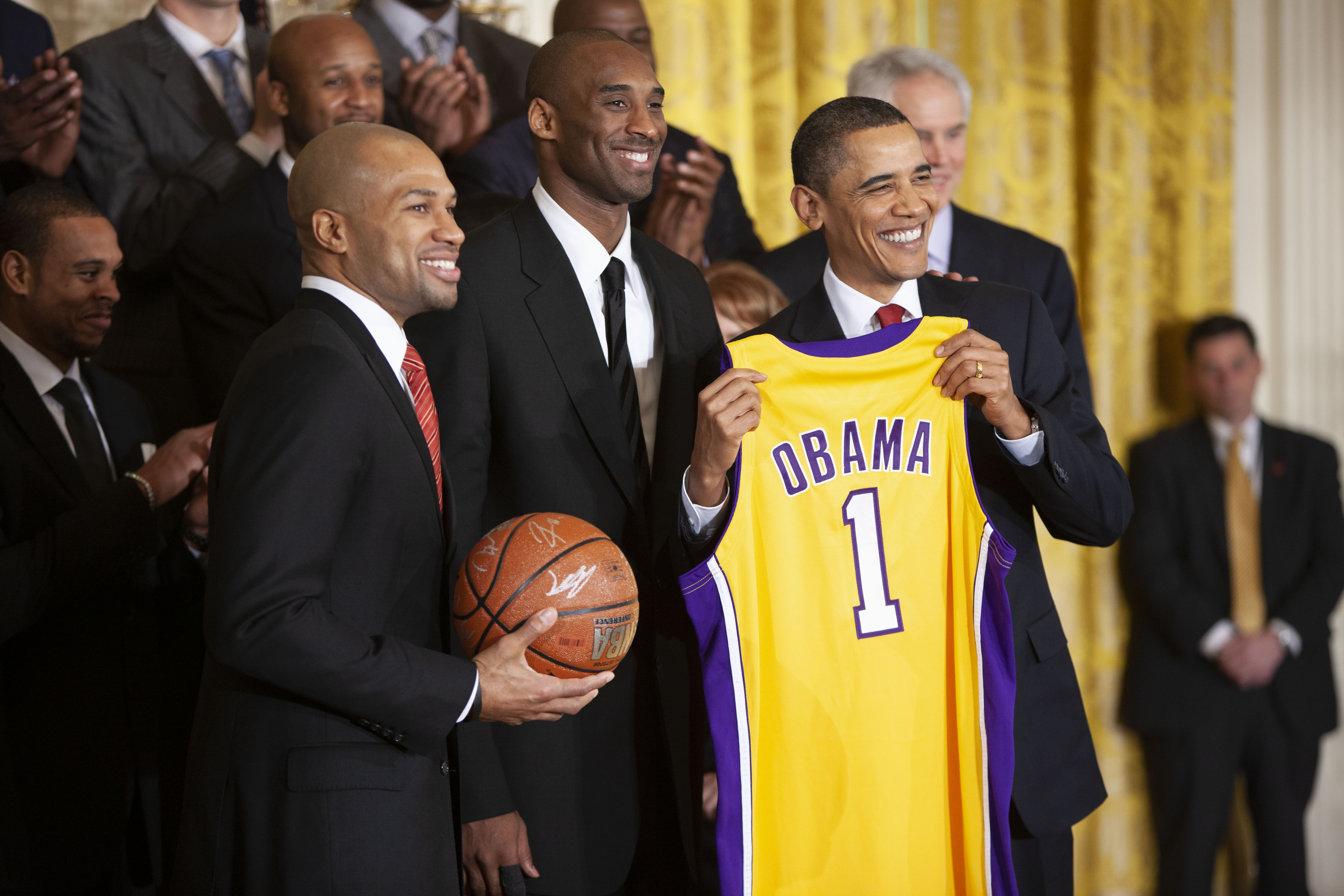
Bryant and the Lakers visiting President Barack Obama after Bryant's fifth NBA title.

After the Lakers once again won the title in Game 7 of the 2010 Finals, Bryant was asked what it meant to him personally. He responded, "Just one more than Shaq ... I can take that to the bank." Bryant won five NBA titles and O'Neal won four. Bryant added, "You guys know how I am. I don't forget anything." O'Neal again congratulated Bryant on his Twitter page: "Congratulations Kobe, u deserve it. U played great. Enjoy it man enjoy it. I know what ur sayin 'Shaq how my ass taste' [sic]." He later revealed to Bryant that he was privately furious after seeing Bryant win his fifth championship, and hearing Bryant's words about him caused O'Neal to vandalize his own house in his anger.

=== 2010–2011 ===
Upon hearing Bryant's comment about having more titles than O'Neal, Wyc Grousbeck, principal owner of the Boston Celtics, said to Danny Ainge, Celtics' president, "Let's go get Shaq." O'Neal signed a two-year contract with the Celtics for the 2010–11 and 2011–12 season for the league minimum of $1.3 million and adding to the Celtics–Lakers rivalry. Bill Simmons of ESPN speculated that O'Neal wanted to tie Bryant with five titles and that still "Shaq hates Kobe and Kobe hates Shaq." O'Neal said he didn't "compete with little guys who run around dominating the ball, throwing up 30 shots a night – like D-Wade, Kobe." O'Neal added that he is only competing against Tim Duncan: "If Tim Duncan gets five rings, then that gives some writer the chance to say 'Duncan is the best,' and I can't have that." The pair played each other one last time on January 30, 2011, with O'Neal's Celtics prevailing over Bryant's Lakers in a 109–96 victory. However, O'Neal was held scoreless, as he was now relegated to a role player. The teams faced again a week and a half later, but O'Neal did not play as he was dealing with an injury.

== Post-playing careers ==
O'Neal announced his retirement via social media on June 1, 2011. Two days later, O'Neal held a press conference at his home in Orlando to officially announce his retirement. When asked who was the greatest player he ever played with during his career, O'Neal did not answer, but Bryant was the only player whose name was mentioned. He also mentioned that his departure from Los Angeles has nothing to do with Kobe Bryant, saying "the reason I left wasn't about what Kobe did; it was about something else. I was making maximum dollars and felt I deserved more. It was a business end." When asked whether leaving Los Angeles was a bad decision, he answered "I don't like to live in a world of ifs, but if we would have stayed, possibly we could have got six [championships]."

After his retirement, O'Neal was hired by Turner Sports as an NBA analyst. When asked whether it would be difficult for him to criticize Bryant, he answered "I have the ability and the backing to give fair criticism. The only time I have trouble with people giving criticism is when they haven't walked that walk. I've walked many walks in my 19-year career, so I think any criticism that I give should be fair." During the 2011 NBA lockout, Bryant discussed his problems with O'Neal with a radio station in Italy, saying "I like players who workout. I used to do that 6–7 hours per day. I cannot stand players who practice for 30 minutes." O'Neal countered that he did not need to work out, and that "My three Finals MVPs speaks for itself."

On February 6, 2012, Bryant passed O'Neal for fifth place on the all-time scoring list. Bryant said it was an honor because of their championships together. O'Neal congratulated Bryant, saying "I'm proud of him. I'm happy for him, and, most of all, I want to thank him for being a part of the greatest 1-2 punch ever created, never to be duplicated." Bryant stated on radio the following day that he and O'Neal were never going to last as teammates. Bryant recalled: "There was an interview that I heard Shaq do which he kind of threw down the challenge of me not being able to win without him. After I read that, I said, 'Aw, that's it.' Some comparison that he made with me and Penny Hardaway, and once I read that, I said, 'You know what? I can't finish my career with people saying that. There's no way.'" In 2013, Bryant said that the two "have a really, really good relationship now", calling it "a good lesson for all of us." He said the two had "mutual respect" for each other, while O'Neal commented that they had an "athletic dislike" for each other but "never had a real dislike". That year, the Lakers retired O'Neal's No. 34 during a halftime ceremony. Bryant did not attend the ceremony, but called O'Neal "the most gifted physical specimen I've ever seen play this game" in a recorded video during the event. Questioned about his absence, Bryant told the media, "I appreciate you guys trying to start some stuff for old times' sake." Later, it came out that Bryant had missed the ceremony because he had been receiving treatment from the Lakers' training staff.

In 2015, O'Neal launched The Big Podcast with Bryant as his first guest. O'Neal introduced Bryant as "the greatest Laker ever" as the two reflected on their feud.

In November 2015, Bryant announced his intention to retire following the 2015–16 NBA season. On March 22, 2016, following a victory over the Memphis Grizzlies, the Inside the NBA crew held an interview with Bryant. In reference to his final career game against the Utah Jazz on April 13, O'Neal asked Bryant, “Can you promise me one thing? I need 50 [points] that night.” Bryant laughed and responded, “Uh, no ... absolutely not." Three weeks later, Bryant led the Lakers to a come-from-behind 101–96 victory over the Jazz with a 60-point performance, outscoring the entire Jazz team 23–21 in the fourth quarter. He was then taken off the floor with 4.1 seconds remaining, to an uproarious Staples Center crowd. O'Neal, who was in attendance, embraced Bryant on the court shortly after the final buzzer. When asked about Bryant's legacy during a segment on TNT, O'Neal repeated his praise of Bryant as "the greatest Laker ever."

One year later, O'Neal was honored by the Lakers with a statue of his likeness outside Staples Center. Bryant was in attendance of the statue's unveiling and spoke at the event, which O'Neal said "meant a lot" to him. Addressing Bryant during the ceremony, O'Neal said, "Next time we're out here for a statue, it'll probably be your statue."

In February 2018, both players recorded a Players Only special for NBA TV where they spoke about their history together, the mutual respect and appreciation, and explanations and regrets over the tensions and feud. Bryant also joked about having more championships than O'Neal.

In August 2019, Bryant stated that he would have won 12 rings, if O'Neal had a better work ethic.

On January 26, 2020, Bryant and his 13-year-old daughter, Gianna, died in a helicopter crash along with seven other people. O'Neal expressed his sorrow on Twitter soon after official reports of Bryant's death were released. Two days after the crash on January 28, a scheduled matchup between the Los Angeles Lakers and Los Angeles Clippers was postponed out of respect for Bryant and with the game due to air on TNT, the Inside the NBA crew opted to instead broadcast a live show at center court of the empty Staples Center, during which a visibly distraught O'Neal embarked on a nearly 7-minute long tearful monologue, expressing his disbelief and heartbreak over Bryant and his daughter’s death. During Bryant's public memorial service on February 24, 2020, O'Neal was one of the major speakers, providing a speech on their time together as teammates.

On May 15, 2021, Bryant was inducted into the Naismith Hall of Fame. O'Neal, who was present at the ceremony, said that while he and Bryant always argued, they always respected each other, and their respect was the reason they won three consecutive championships.

On February 8, 2024, the day of Bryant's statue unveiling, O'Neal called Bryant the most competitive player he had ever seen and the best teammate he ever had.
