= Posse =

Posse (/ˈpɒs.i/, POSS-ee) is a shortened form of posse comitatus, a group of people summoned to assist law enforcement. The term is also used colloquially to mean a group of friends or associates. Posse may also refer to:

== Arts and entertainment ==
- Posse (1975 film), an American Western produced and directed by and starring Kirk Douglas
- Posse (1993 film), a revisionist Western directed by and starring Mario Van Peebles
- "Posse (I Need You on the Floor)", a 2001 single by German band Scooter
- Posse (band), an American indie rock band started in 2010 in Seattle

== Other uses ==
- Posse (horse), a thoroughbred racehorse
- Posse (surname), including a list of people with the name
- Posse, Goiás, a municipality in the northeast of the Brazilian state of Goiás
- Posse Foundation, a US nonprofit organization that identifies, recruits, and trains student leaders from public high schools to form multicultural teams
- POSSE project (Portable Open Source Security Elements), a software security initiative
- POSSE, a social web and IndieWeb abbreviation for "Publish (on your) Own Site, Syndicate Elsewhere", a strategy for content producers.
- Jamaican posse, a loose coalition of street gangs

== See also ==
- Posse comitatus (disambiguation)
- Posse cut, a type of hip hop song that involves successive verses by four or more rappers.
