= Posse comitatus (disambiguation) =

Posse comitatus is the authority of a law officer to conscript any able-bodied males to assist him.

Posse comitatus may also refer to:

- Posse Comitatus (organization), a loosely organized far-right social movement that opposes the United States federal government and believes in localism
- Posse Comitatus Act, a United States federal law prohibiting members of the military from exercising powers that maintain "law and order" on non-federal property
- "Posse Comitatus" (The West Wing), the third-season finale of the TV series The West Wing
- "Posse Comitatus", a ninth-season episode of the TV series JAG

== See also ==
- Posse (disambiguation)
