= 2002 NBA Finals =

2002 basketball championship series

Team	Coach	Wins
Los Angeles Lakers	Phil Jackson	4
New Jersey Nets	Byron Scott	0
- Dates: June 5–12
- MVP: Shaquille O'Neal (Los Angeles Lakers)
- Hall of Famers: Lakers: Kobe Bryant (2020); Shaquille O'Neal (2016); Mitch Richmond (2014); Nets: Jason Kidd (2018); Coaches: Phil Jackson (2007); Tex Winter (2011); Officials: Dick Bavetta (2015); Danny Crawford (2025); Broadcaster: Chick Hearn (2003)
- Eastern finals: Nets defeated Celtics, 4–2
- Western finals: Lakers defeated Kings, 4–3

The 2002 NBA Finals was the championship series of the National Basketball Association's (NBA) 2001–02 season, and the culmination of the season's playoffs. In a best-of-seven series, the Western Conference champion Los Angeles Lakers swept the Eastern Conference champion New Jersey Nets to three-peat as NBA champions, winning their 14th championship in team history.

The Lakers became the first team since the Chicago Bulls to achieve a three-peat in NBA history. The series began on June 5 and ended on June 12. Lakers coach Phil Jackson won his ninth ring, tying him with Red Auerbach for most all-time. During the series, he surpassed Pat Riley for most career playoffs wins with 156. Shaquille O'Neal of the Lakers was named the NBA Finals Most Valuable Player (MVP) for the third consecutive year, after dominant performances averaging 36.3 points, 12.3 rebounds, and 2.8 blocks per game.

This was the last Finals to date to be broadcast by NBC, as ABC would acquire the broadcast rights starting in 2003. As of 2026, the Lakers are the most recent team in the four North American major professional sports leagues to accomplish a three-peat.

== Background ==
After the September 11th terrorist attack, NBA jerseys during the 2001–02 season included a memorial patch. For the 2002 Finals, because a memorial patch was already placed on the right chest, the Finals patch was simplified and integrated into the NBA logoman on the left side of the jerseys.

=== New Jersey Nets ===
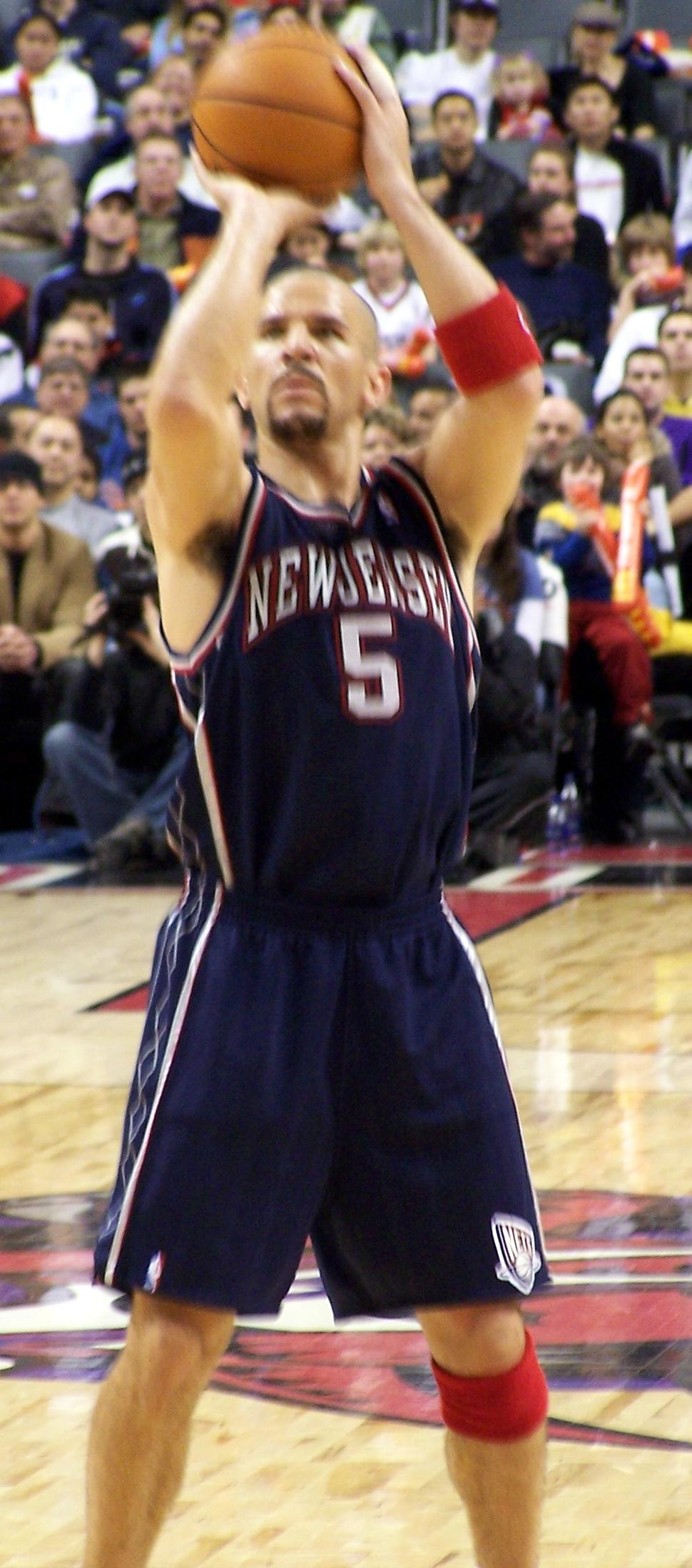
Jason Kidd, New Jersey's prized acquisition in the summer of 2001

Entering the 2001–02 season, the New Jersey Nets were enduring a three-year playoff drought and had a 73–141 record over that span. In 1999, the Nets hired Rod Thorn as team president and immediately, he hired the recently retired Byron Scott to coach New Jersey. Thorn then dealt for Stephon Marbury in a three-team trade with the Milwaukee Bucks and Minnesota Timberwolves, trading Sam Cassell away to the Bucks. Due to the Nets' 31–51 season in 1999–2000 season, they had the first overall pick in the 2000 NBA draft, which they used to select power forward Kenyon Martin out of the University of Cincinnati. Despite the reshuffling of the roster and an NBA All-Rookie Team season for Martin, New Jersey struggled, ending the season with a 26–56 (.317) record, and owned the 7th pick in the upcoming draft.

With another lottery pick, Thorn dealt it to the Houston Rockets for draftees Richard Jefferson, Jason Collins and Brandon Armstrong. The next day, Phoenix Suns owner Jerry Colangelo announced a franchise-shaking trade; Phoenix would swap their point guard Jason Kidd for his New Jersey counterpart Stephon Marbury.

With the Princeton offense installed from the coaching staff, the Nets rebounded to a 52–30 (.634) mark, a twenty-six-win improvement from the last season, and clinched the number-one seed in the Eastern Conference. Kidd finished the season awarded with first team spots on both the All-NBA and All-Defensive Teams and was selected for his fifth All-Star game. He also finished runner-up to San Antonio Spurs power forward Tim Duncan in the Most Valuable Player voting. Richard Jefferson was an All-Rookie second team selection and Thorn, the architect of the franchise's resurgence, was awarded NBA Executive of the Year. \ In the first round of the playoffs, New Jersey survived a scare against the Indiana Pacers, escaping game five in double overtime to advance. It was the Nets' first playoff series win since 1984. They then dismissed the Charlotte Hornets in five games before meeting their Atlantic Division rivals, the Boston Celtics, in the conference finals. The Nets and Celtics split the first two games in New Jersey before moving to Boston. In game 3, the Nets were dominating the Celtics, leading by as much as 21 in the fourth quarter. However, Boston, led by small forward Paul Pierce, then proceeded to outscore New Jersey 41–16 in the final period, rallying to win 94 to 90. Pierce himself scored 19 points, more than the Nets combined in the fourth, to complete the greatest fourth-quarter comeback in NBA playoff history.

The Nets rebounded in a 94–92 game 4 victory, that saw another Boston comeback, albeit one that fell short because Pierce missed crucial free throws late. New Jersey then took control of the series and won the next two games in large fashion to finish off Boston in six games, earning the franchise's first NBA Finals appearance and becoming the third former American Basketball Association (ABA) team to make the Finals (the Spurs and the Pacers being the first two). With averages of 17.5 points, 11.2 rebounds, and 10.2 assists per game during the six-game conference finals, Kidd become only the fourth player in NBA history to average a triple-double over a course of a series and the second to have at least three.

=== Los Angeles Lakers ===
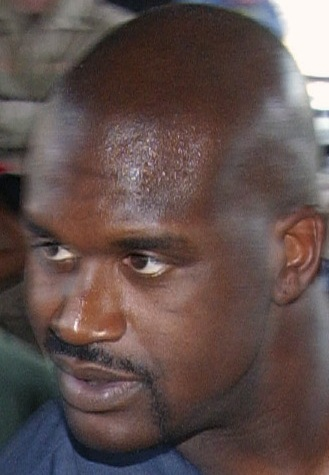
All-Star center Shaquille O'Neal averaged 27 points and 11 rebounds in the regular season in 67 games.

In stark contrast to New Jersey, the Los Angeles Lakers entered the season with high expectations, having won the last two NBA championships. In addition, Los Angeles was coming off of a 15–1 (.938 winning percentage) run through the 2001 NBA playoffs, the greatest in NBA history, besting the 1983 Philadelphia 76ers' 12–1 (.923) run and were the first team to go undefeated on the road in the playoffs. Since Phil Jackson had arrived to coach the Lakers in 1999, they had a 123–41 mark in the regular season and a 28–9 record in the postseason.

Amid tensions between co-captains Shaquille O'Neal and Kobe Bryant, the franchise had another stellar season, finishing 58–24 (.707), good for second in the Pacific Division and earning the third seed in the Western Conference. Bryant and O'Neal were voted starters in the 2002 NBA All-Star Game, where Bryant won the game MVP trophy in his hometown Philadelphia. The duo appeared on the All-NBA First Team and Bryant was honored with a Second-Team All-Defensive Team selection.

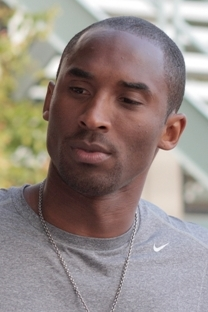
Kobe Bryant continued to form the league's best 1-2 combo with O'Neal. He averaged 25.2 in 80 games.

The Lakers shot out to another quick start in the playoffs, finishing the Portland Trail Blazers in three games with a Robert Horry game-winner. The San Antonio Spurs were dispatched in five games before Los Angeles met their biggest challenge in the duration of their championship reign in the Western Conference finals: the Sacramento Kings. With the best record in the West, the Kings held home court advantage against the Lakers and split the first two games in ARCO Arena before the series shifted to Staples Center, where Sacramento blew out Los Angeles in game 3 and led as much as 27 before settling with a 103–90 decision.

In game 4, Sacramento led Los Angeles 40–20 at the end of the first quarter and held a lead as large as 26. But, the Lakers staged a second-half comeback to win 100–99, punctuated by Horry's buzzer-beating three-point shot. Back in Sacramento for game 5, the Kings staged some late-game heroics of their own as Mike Bibby nailed a jumper with 8.2 seconds remaining, giving his team not only a 92–91 win, but a 3–2 series advantage.

With their season on the line, the Lakers returned home for game 6. In a controversial contest, one in which the Lakers attempted 27 free throws in the fourth quarter to Sacramento's nine, O'Neal and Bryant had one of their most dominant performances as a duo. O'Neal recorded 41 points and 17 rebounds while Bryant contributed 31 points, 11 rebounds and five assists to force a game 7 in ARCO Arena. The outrage was such that politician Ralph Nader demanded an investigation. In game 7, the Lakers prevailed in overtime 112–106 to earn their third straight NBA Finals berth.

=== Road to the Finals ===
Los Angeles Lakers (Western Conference champion)		New Jersey Nets (Eastern Conference champion)
# / Western Conference; # / Team / W / L / PCT / GB; 1 / z-Sacramento Kings / 61 / 21 / .744 / –; 2 / y-San Antonio Spurs / 58 / 24 / .707 / 3; 3 / x-Los Angeles Lakers / 58 / 24 / .707 / 3; 4 / x-Dallas Mavericks / 57 / 25 / .695 / 4; 5 / x-Minnesota Timberwolves / 50 / 32 / .610 / 11; 6 / x-Portland Trail Blazers / 49 / 33 / .598 / 12; 7 / x-Seattle SuperSonics / 45 / 37 / .549 / 16; 8 / x-Utah Jazz / 44 / 38 / .537 / 17; 9 / e-Los Angeles Clippers / 39 / 43 / .476 / 22; 10 / e-Phoenix Suns / 36 / 46 / .439 / 25; 11 / e-Houston Rockets / 28 / 54 / .341 / 33; 12 / e-Denver Nuggets / 27 / 55 / .329 / 34; 13 / e-Memphis Grizzlies / 23 / 59 / .280 / 38; 14 / e-Golden State Warriors / 21 / 61 / .256 / 40; 3rd seed in the West, 2nd (tied) best league record	Regular season	# / Eastern Conference; # / Team / W / L / PCT / GB; 1 / c-New Jersey Nets / 52 / 30 / .634 / –; 2 / y-Detroit Pistons / 50 / 32 / .610 / 2; 3 / x-Boston Celtics / 49 / 33 / .598 / 3; 4 / x-Charlotte Hornets / 44 / 38 / .537 / 8; 5 / x-Orlando Magic / 44 / 38 / .537 / 8; 6 / x-Philadelphia 76ers / 43 / 39 / .524 / 9; 7 / x-Toronto Raptors / 42 / 40 / .512 / 10; 8 / x-Indiana Pacers / 42 / 40 / .512 / 10; 9 / e-Milwaukee Bucks / 41 / 41 / .500 / 11; 10 / e-Washington Wizards / 37 / 45 / .451 / 15; 11 / e-Miami Heat / 36 / 46 / .439 / 16; 12 / e-Atlanta Hawks / 33 / 49 / .402 / 19; 13 / e-New York Knicks / 30 / 52 / .366 / 22; 14 / e-Cleveland Cavaliers / 29 / 53 / .354 / 23; 15 / e-Chicago Bulls / 21 / 61 / .256 / 31; 1st seed in the East, 5th best league record
Defeated the (6) Portland Trail Blazers, 3–0	First round	Defeated the (8) Indiana Pacers, 3–2
Defeated the (2) San Antonio Spurs, 4–1	Conference semifinals	Defeated the (4) Charlotte Hornets, 4–1
Defeated the (1) Sacramento Kings, 4–3	Conference finals	Defeated the (3) Boston Celtics, 4–2

=== Regular season series ===
The Los Angeles Lakers and New Jersey Nets split both games in the regular season, each winning on their home court.

FSN West,
FSN New York

March 5

Recap at the Wayback Machine (archived February 12, 2005)

New Jersey Nets 92, Los Angeles Lakers 101

Staples Center, Los Angeles, California

KCAL,
FSN New York

April 2

Recap at the Wayback Machine (archived February 12, 2005)

Los Angeles Lakers 92, New Jersey Nets 94

Continental Airlines Arena, East Rutherford, New Jersey

== Rosters ==
=== Los Angeles Lakers ===
2001–02 Los Angeles Lakers roster
Players

Pos.	No.	Player	Height	Weight	DOB	From
G/F	8	Kobe Bryant	6 ft 6 in (1.98 m)	220 lb (100 kg)	1978–08-23	Lower Merion HS (PA)
G	2	Derek Fisher	6 ft 1 in (1.85 m)	205 lb (93 kg)	1974–08-09	Little Rock
F	17	Rick Fox	6 ft 7 in (2.01 m)	235 lb (107 kg)	1969–07–24	North Carolina
F	3	Devean George	6 ft 8 in (2.03 m)	240 lb (109 kg)	1977–08–29	Augsburg
F	5	Robert Horry	6 ft 10 in (2.08 m)	240 lb (109 kg)	1970–08–25	Alabama
G	10	Lindsey Hunter	6 ft 2 in (1.88 m)	195 lb (88 kg)	1970–12–03	Jackson State
F	35	Mark Madsen	6 ft 9 in (2.06 m)	245 lb (111 kg)	1976–01–28	Stanford
F/C	6	Jelani McCoy (IN)	6 ft 10 in (2.08 m)	255 lb (116 kg)	1977–12–06	UCLA
F	14	Stanislav Medvedenko	6 ft 10 in (2.08 m)	250 lb (113 kg)	1979–04–04	Ukraine
C	34	Shaquille O'Neal	7 ft 1 in (2.16 m)	338 lb (153 kg)	1972–03–06	LSU
G	23	Mitch Richmond	6 ft 5 in (1.96 m)	220 lb (100 kg)	1965–06–30	Kansas State
G	20	Brian Shaw	6 ft 6 in (1.98 m)	205 lb (93 kg)	1966–03–22	UC Santa Barbara
F/C	52	Samaki Walker	6 ft 9 in (2.06 m)	255 lb (116 kg)	1976–02–25	Louisville

Coaches
Head coach
- Phil Jackson (North Dakota)
Assistant(s)
- Jim Cleamons (Ohio State)
- Frank Hamblen (Syracuse)
- Kurt Rambis (Santa Clara)
- Tex Winter (USC)

Legend
- (DP) Unsigned draft pick
- (FA) Free agent
- (S) Suspended
- Injured

Roster
Updated: June 14, 2002

=== New Jersey Nets ===
2001–02 New Jersey Nets roster
Players

Pos.	No.	Player	Height	Weight	DOB	From
G	1	Brandon Armstrong	6 ft 5 in (1.96 m)	188 lb (85 kg)	1980–06–16	Pepperdine
C	35	Jason Collins	7 ft 0 in (2.13 m)	255 lb (116 kg)	1978–12–02	Stanford
G	12	Lucious Harris	6 ft 5 in (1.96 m)	190 lb (86 kg)	1970–12–18	Long Beach State
F	24	Richard Jefferson	6 ft 7 in (2.01 m)	222 lb (101 kg)	1980–06–21	Arizona
G	8	Anthony Johnson	6 ft 3 in (1.91 m)	190 lb (86 kg)	1974–10–02	College of Charleston
G	5	Jason Kidd	6 ft 4 in (1.93 m)	204 lb (93 kg)	1973–03–23	California
G	30	Kerry Kittles	6 ft 5 in (1.96 m)	179 lb (81 kg)	1974–06–12	Villanova
C	11	Todd MacCulloch	7 ft 0 in (2.13 m)	280 lb (127 kg)	1976–01–27	Washington
F	13	Donny Marshall	6 ft 7 in (2.01 m)	230 lb (104 kg)	1972–07–17	Connecticut
F	6	Kenyon Martin	6 ft 9 in (2.06 m)	234 lb (106 kg)	1977–12–30	Cincinnati
F	21	Brian Scalabrine	6 ft 9 in (2.06 m)	241 lb (109 kg)	1978–03–18	USC
F	44	Keith Van Horn	6 ft 10 in (2.08 m)	220 lb (100 kg)	1975–10–23	Utah
F/C	34	Aaron Williams	6 ft 9 in (2.06 m)	220 lb (100 kg)	1971–10–02	Xavier

Coaches
Head coach
- Byron Scott (Arizona State)
Assistant(s)
- Lawrence Frank (Indiana)
- Eddie Jordan (Rutgers)
- Mike O'Koren (North Carolina)

Legend
- (DP) Unsigned draft pick
- (FA) Free agent
- (S) Suspended
- Injured

Roster
Updated: June 14, 2002

== Series summary ==
Game	Date	Road team	Result	Home team
Game 1	June 5	New Jersey Nets	94–99 (0–1)	Los Angeles Lakers
Game 2	June 7	New Jersey Nets	83–106 (0–2)	Los Angeles Lakers
Game 3	June 9	Los Angeles Lakers	106–103 (3–0)	New Jersey Nets
Game 4	June 12	Los Angeles Lakers	113–107 (4–0)	New Jersey Nets

== Game summaries ==
All times listed below are Eastern Daylight Time. If the venue is located in a different time zone, the local time is also given.

=== Game 1 ===
NBC

June 5
9:30 pm (6:30 pm PDT)

Recap at the Wayback Machine (archived December 4, 2004)

New Jersey Nets 94, Los Angeles Lakers 99
Scoring by quarter: 14–29, 22–19, 27–24, 31–27
Pts: Jason Kidd 23; Rebs: Jason Kidd 10; Asts: Jason Kidd 10	Pts: Shaquille O'Neal 36; Rebs: Shaquille O'Neal 16; Asts: Kobe Bryant 6
Los Angeles leads the series, 1–0

Staples Center, Los Angeles, California
Attendance: 18,997
Referees:
- #17 Joe Crawford
- #10 Ron Garretson
- #35 Jack Nies

Los Angeles's Staples Center sold out for the inaugural game of the 2002 NBA Finals, with nearly 19,000 on hand. The Nets trotted out a lineup of Jason Kidd, Kerry Kittles, Kenyon Martin, Keith Van Horn, and Todd MacCulloch to hold up against the two-time defending and heavily favored champions. The Lakers brought out Derek Fisher, Rick Fox, Shaquille O'Neal, Robert Horry, and Kobe Bryant, who drew the assignment of guarding Kidd. New Jersey head coach Byron Scott, a member of the Showtime Lakers, received a standing ovation.

Taking advantage of a late arrival to the arena by New Jersey, L.A. dominated the first 17 minutes of play with a 42–19 score by the 6:41 mark in the second quarter. From that point on, the Nets went on a 17–6 run to close the lead to a respectable 12. They had no answer for O'Neal, however, who had bullied MacCulloch into 16 points and 6 rebounds by half-time. The Nets outscored the Lakers in the third but stood steadfast as Bryant scored 11 of his 22 in the third.

New Jersey battled back, coming as close as three several times in the final quarter. Desperate to take the lead, they utilized the "Hack-a-Shaq" strategy midway in the fourth. It backfired, as O'Neal was 5–8 from the free throw line and had 16 points and 9 rebounds in the period alone.

New Jersey was doomed by their late start and poor shooting. The Nets, who shot 45% from the field and 74% on free throws were 39% and 57% respectively. Kidd finished with a triple-double, the 26th in Finals history and the first since Charles Barkley's in game 4 of the 1993 Finals.

=== Game 2 ===
NBC

June 7
9:30 pm (6:30 pm PDT)

Recap at the Wayback Machine (archived December 9, 2004)

New Jersey Nets 83, Los Angeles Lakers 106
Scoring by quarter: 21–27, 22–22, 18–28, 22–29
Pts: Kerry Kittles 23; Rebs: Jason Kidd 9 Asts: Jason Kidd 7	Pts: Shaquille O'Neal 40; Rebs: Shaquille O'Neal 12; Asts: Shaquille O'Neal 8
Los Angeles leads the series, 2–0

Staples Center, Los Angeles, California
Attendance: 18,997
Referees:
- #12 Don Vaden
- #15 Bennett Salvatore
- #29 Steve Javie

=== Game 3 ===
NBC

June 9
8:30 pm

Recap at the Wayback Machine (archived July 25, 2008)

Los Angeles Lakers 106, New Jersey Nets 103
Scoring by quarter: 31–23, 21–23, 26–32, 28–25
Pts: Kobe Bryant 36; Rebs: Shaquille O'Neal 11; Asts: Derek Fisher 6	Pts: Jason Kidd 30; Rebs: Kidd, Van Horn 5 each Asts: Jason Kidd 10
Los Angeles leads the series, 3–0

Continental Airlines Arena, East Rutherford, New Jersey
Attendance: 19,215
Referees:
- #26 Bob Delaney
- #43 Dan Crawford
- #27 Dick Bavetta

Beginning halfway through the first quarter, the Lakers built up a sizable lead for most of the game. However, the Nets would quickly tie and take the lead at the end of the third and beginning of the fourth quarter with a Kenyon Martin and Jason Kidd two point shot, respectively. With three minutes to go in the fourth, Robert Horry hit a three pointer to give the Lakers a 98–96 lead, which would end up never going away and gave them the edge over the Nets, as they would go on to win 106–103.

=== Game 4 ===
NBC

June 12
9:30 pm

Recap at the Wayback Machine (archived July 25, 2008)

Los Angeles Lakers 113, New Jersey Nets 107
Scoring by quarter: 27–34, 31–23, 26–23, 29–27
Pts: Shaquille O'Neal 34; Rebs: Shaquille O'Neal 10; Asts: Kobe Bryant 8	Pts: Kenyon Martin 35; Rebs: Kenyon Martin 11; Asts: Jason Kidd 12
Los Angeles wins the NBA Finals, 4–0

Continental Airlines Arena, East Rutherford, New Jersey
Attendance: 19,296
Referees:
- Ted Bernhardt
- Eddie Rush
- Bernie Fryer

== Player statistics ==
Legend
GP	Games played	GS	Games started	MPG	Minutes per game
FG%	Field-goal percentage	3P%	3-point field-goal percentage	FT%	Free-throw percentage
RPG	Rebounds per game	APG	Assists per game	SPG	Steals per game
BPG	Blocks per game	PPG	Points per game

Los Angeles Lakers

Los Angeles Lakers statistics
Player	GP	GS	MPG	FG%	3P%	FT%	RPG	APG	SPG	BPG	PPG
Kobe Bryant	4	4	43.8	.514	.545	.806	5.8	5.3	1.5	0.8	26.8
Derek Fisher	4	4	33.0	.515	.667	.643	3.5	3.8	0.3	0.0	12.8
Rick Fox	4	4	36.0	.522	.455	.833	6.3	3.5	1.5	0.5	9.8
Devean George	4	0	18.0	.435	.600	1.000	4.8	0.0	0.3	0.5	6.5
Robert Horry	4	4	39.8	.458	.455	.833	7.3	4.3	2.8	1.8	8.0
Lindsey Hunter	3	0	3.7	.200	.000	.000	0.3	0.0	0.0	0.0	0.7
Mark Madsen	1	0	2.0	.000	.000	.000	0.0	0.0	0.0	0.0	0.0
Slava Medvedenko	2	0	4.5	1.000	.000	.000	0.5	0.0	0.0	0.0	1.0
Shaquille O'Neal	4	4	41.5	.595	.000	.662	12.3	3.8	0.5	2.8	36.3
Mitch Richmond	1	0	1.0	1.000	.000	.000	0.0	0.0	0.0	0.0	2.0
Brian Shaw	4	0	16.3	.286	.222	.000	1.8	2.5	0.3	0.5	3.5
Samaki Walker	4	0	6.0	.250	.000	1.000	2.0	0.0	0.0	0.3	1.0

New Jersey Nets

New Jersey Nets statistics
Player	GP	GS	MPG	FG%	3P%	FT%	RPG	APG	SPG	BPG	PPG
Jason Collins	4	0	18.8	.500	.000	.875	2.5	0.3	0.3	0.5	4.3
Lucious Harris	4	0	22.8	.344	.200	.800	2.8	2.0	1.0	0.0	7.8
Richard Jefferson	4	0	24.3	.524	.000	.455	4.5	1.3	1.0	0.0	6.8
Anthony Johnson	4	0	5.3	.333	.000	.500	0.5	0.3	0.0	0.0	1.3
Jason Kidd	4	4	42.0	.438	.300	.636	7.3	9.8	2.3	0.8	20.8
Kerry Kittles	4	4	26.5	.452	.313	.700	2.0	2.5	1.5	0.5	12.5
Todd MacCulloch	4	4	18.5	.500	.000	0.5	5.0	0.5	0.8	1.0	7.5
Donny Marshall	2	0	1.0	.000	.000	.000	0.0	0.0	0.0	0.0	0.0
Kenyon Martin	4	4	39.5	.467	.200	.654	6.5	2.5	1.5	1.0	22.0
Brian Scalabrine	1	0	1.0	.000	.000	.000	0.0	0.0	0.0	0.0	0.0
Keith Van Horn	4	4	30.3	.386	.417	.750	5.8	2.3	0.5	0.3	10.5
Aaron Williams	4	0	11.5	.375	.000	1.000	2.3	0.3	0.8	0.5	3.5

== Media coverage ==
The Finals were produced and televised in the United States by NBC. The local NBC stations for the competing teams were East Coast flagship WNBC in the New York metropolitan area and West Coast flagship KNBC in Los Angeles. Marv Albert provided play-by-play calling. Basketball Hall of Famer Bill Walton and Steve "Snapper" Jones handled color duties. Jim Gray and Lewis Johnson roamed the sidelines for the Lakers and Nets respectively. Bob Costas hosted pregame and half-time shows with analyst Tom Tolbert. Ernie Johnson, Kenny Smith, and Charles Barkley from TNT's Inside the NBA made special guest appearances during halftime of game 1. Brent Musburger and Jack Ramsay called the four games on ESPN Radio. Hannah Storm hosted the post-game show.

The finals also had Spanish-language television and radio broadcasts in the United States.

Until 2025, the series was also NBC's final broadcast of the NBA. In January 2002, the league's broadcast rights were awarded to ABC and ESPN in a six-year deal, which was renewed for an additional eight years in 2007. For the 2025–26 season, NBC signed an 11-year deal marking a return to the NBA, but ABC will continue to exclusively broadcast the NBA Finals.

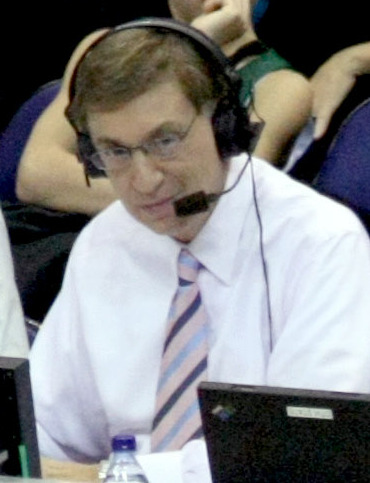
The 2002 series was Marv Albert's last NBA Finals.

At the conclusion of game 4, NBC presented highlights of the twelve years of their NBA broadcasts; among them the Chicago Bulls' dynasty led by Michael Jordan and Scottie Pippen, the retirements of Larry Bird and Magic Johnson and the Los Angeles Lakers' current Shaq/Kobe reign, as the credits rolled. NBC also played "Winning It All" by The Outfield, which they had used for the close of their NBA Finals broadcasts from 1992 to 1996. The last image displayed was of an empty gym, showing a basketball bouncing into the background, as "To The Flemish Cap" from the soundtrack to the film The Perfect Storm played. NBC ended the broadcast (and their 12-year run broadcasting NBA basketball) by displaying over the shot the message "Thanks for the memories".

The 2002 Finals was also Marv Albert's last NBA Finals assignment. After the series, Albert's national television duties continued with TNT and Albert remained with TNT until his retirement in 2021, but only called games until the conference finals each season.

Will Lyman narrated the season-ending documentary for NBA Entertainment.

2002 NBA Finals ratings

Game 1	Game 2	Game 3	Game 4
10.6/20	9.1/18	10.2/18	10.8/19

== Impact and aftermath ==
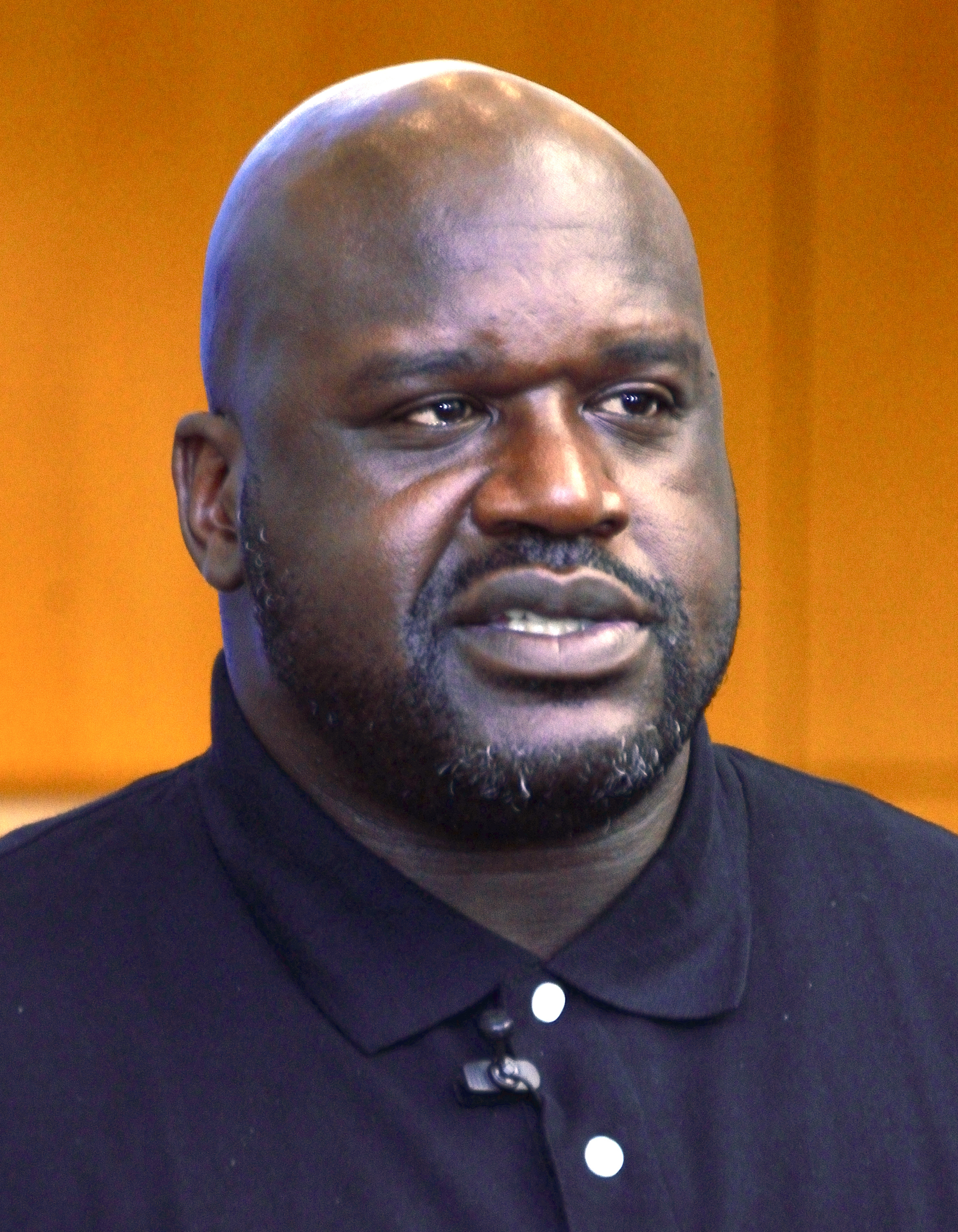
Shaquille O'Neal (2002) is still the only player other than Michael Jordan to win the NBA Finals Most Valuable Player Award in three consecutive seasons (Jordan accomplished the feat on two occasions).

=== Lakers ===
The Lakers victory in this year's Finals would also mark the beginning of what would become a successful year for professional sports teams in the Los Angeles metropolitan area. The nearby Anaheim Angels would later claim their first World Series championship four months later. It marked the second occurrence that a city/metropolitan area won both NBA and Major League Baseball (MLB) championships in the same calendar year. The last time this occurred was in 1988, when the Lakers won that year's NBA Finals in June, and the Dodgers followed suit with a World Series victory four months later. In relation to sports of smaller leagues, the Los Angeles Sparks won the WNBA Finals two months after the Lakers' 2002 Finals victory; the Los Angeles Galaxy won the MLS Cup exactly one week prior to the Angels' World Series victory in October. The successes of Los Angeles area teams led Sporting News magazine to declare Anaheim/Los Angeles as "Best Sports City" in 2003.

As of 2026, the Lakers are the last team to successfully accomplish a three-peat in the "Big Four" North American professional sports leagues. Since then, only two NBA teams unsuccessfully tried to achieve a three-peat: the Miami Heat, who lost to the San Antonio Spurs in 2014 after winning in 2012 and 2013, and the Golden State Warriors, who won two titles in 2017 and 2018 before losing in 2019 to the Toronto Raptors. Outside the NBA, the National Hockey League (NHL)'s Tampa Bay Lightning lost to the Colorado Avalanche in their third straight Stanley Cup Final in 2022, and the National Football League (NFL)'s Kansas City Chiefs attempted to become the first team to win three consecutive Super Bowl titles before losing to the Philadelphia Eagles in Super Bowl LIX (2024 season).

The Lakers were off to a slow start in the 2002–03 NBA season. By this time, the relationship between Kobe Bryant and Shaquille O'Neal began to show cracks. Injuries were also starting to slow the Lakers down. Nevertheless, the Lakers won 50 games, but would only earn the fifth seed, thereby not earning the home-court advantage. Still, the Lakers took down the fourth-seeded Minnesota Timberwolves in six games. However, they were eliminated by the San Antonio Spurs, who finally earned revenge after their previous two defeats to the Lakers in the 2001 and 2002 NBA playoffs. In game 5, Robert Horry, a perennial clutch threat in the playoffs, missed a game-winning three that would've given the Lakers a 3–2 series lead. The miss eventually led to Horry's free-agent defection to the Spurs the following season.

=== Nets ===
The Nets made it back to the Finals in 2003. They won 49 games and the Atlantic Division title, and heading into the Finals they won 10 straight games, two in the six-game first round win over the Milwaukee Bucks, and two four-game sweeps of the Boston Celtics and Detroit Pistons. However, they still came up short, losing in six games to the Spurs, in the first NBA Finals series featuring former ABA teams. Rookies Richard Jefferson and Brian Scalabrine would later win NBA championships in their career (Scalabrine with the 2007–08 Boston Celtics and Jefferson with the 2015–16 Cleveland Cavaliers). Star point guard Jason Kidd also won a championship with the 2010–11 Dallas Mavericks.

Byron Scott later coached the Lakers from 2014 to 2016, the last few years of Kobe Bryant's career.
