= The Last Season: A Team in Search of Its Soul =

Book by Phil Jackson

- Author: Phil Jackson and Michael Arkush
- Published: 2004 (Penguin Books) (US)
- Publication place: United States
- Pages: 304 (U.S. paperback)
- ISBN: 0-143-03587-8 (US)

The Last Season: A Team in Search of Its Soul is a book by the former American basketball coach Phil Jackson, originally published by the Penguin Press in 2004. The book deals with the ups and downs of the Los Angeles Lakers' 2003-04 season and offers Jackson's insight into the team's season that ended in a breakup but not a championship, despite boasting about future hall of famers Shaquille O'Neal, Karl Malone, Gary Payton, and Kobe Bryant.

== Purpose ==
In the prologue, Jackson says: "I didn't want this book to be about the small petty gossip that makes up a lot of the NBA world. We have plenty of reporters who fill that bill. I did want to develop a story about a season that was built around a team of stars—a couple of them past their prime and a couple who have all the problems that the modern sports world can bear," obvious references to Malone and Payton and O'Neal and Bryant, respectively. Jackson, also the co-author of Maverick (1975), Sacred Hoops: Spiritual Lessons of a Hardwood Warrior (1995), and More Than a Game (2001), goes on to say that he had kept journal entries in each of his seasons as an NBA head coach, and had encouragement to develop the season into a story.

== 2003–04 offseason, season, and playoffs ==
The announcement of Bryant's Colorado sexual assault charges obscured the promise of the Lakers' recent offseason acquisitions of Payton and Malone. Regarding news of Bryant, Jackson wrote of his concern but also: "Kobe can be consumed with surprising anger, which he's displayed toward me and toward his teammates....He rebels against authority." Jackson and Laker management decided to loosen their reins on Bryant, who decided to play the season as normal, but with admittedly no patience for O'Neal's comments to the media. As in past seasons, the tensions between the angry Bryant and O'Neal grew, with intense media attention. Jackson, who suggests he has had a tenuous relationship with Bryant ever since a remark he made in a 2001 interview that Bryant "sabotaged" games in high school to win them at the end, states that the Lakers suspended talks over a contract extension after he shouted to General Manager Mitch Kupchak "I won't coach this team next year if [Bryant] is still here. He won't listen to anyone. I've had it with this kid." Bryant, after realizing the apparent finality of his time with Jackson, more or less reached a distanced truce with him. An aging Laker team faced with these strains, veterans learning the triangle offense, and Malone's injury narrowly won the Pacific division and fought its way through the Western Conference playoffs (marked by a series-turning miracle game-winning shot against San Antonio by Derek Fisher and a career game from Kareem Rush to eliminate Minnesota in the conference finals) and advanced to the Finals.

The Lakers faced a less-heralded but deeply talented Detroit Pistons team, where Jackson noted the pros and cons of Detroit coach Larry Brown, saying that Brown was a great coach who got his teams to play well above their previous levels but was so impossible to satisfy that players eventually stopped listening to him; Jackson also noted the difficulties in determining who the "key" to Detroit was (as the Pistons did not have obvious superstars along the lines of Shaq and Kobe) and gearing his Lakers towards stopping that player. The Pistons ended up winning the title with a decisive 4-1 swing, and Jackson wrote that as the series wound down, he realized who the key for Detroit was: Chauncey Billups. The 2003-04 Lakers' season, nicknamed "The Last Chance" and with a theme of sacrifice, ended short of an NBA championship and thus in disappointment.

== Aftermath and controversy ==
The controversy surrounding the book concerns Jackson's characterization of Bryant and treatment of the breakup. In The Last Season, Jackson suggests Bryant's influence on the dissolution and labels him "uncoachable". According to Jackson, in Bryant's exit interview with him, he stated that O'Neal's fate with the Lakers would affect his decision to return, saying "I'm tired of being a sidekick." Later in a phone call with Lakers owner Jerry Buss, Jackson recounts Buss's explanation of the team's preference for Bryant rather than O'Neal, of which Jackson disapproved: "It's not that I'm enamoured with Kobe's character. But he is twenty-six in August. The seven years ahead are the prime years of his career....I have to serve the people who are loyal to me. My mail runs about 5-1 on Kobe to Shaq." Jackson makes his own departure sound like a mutual decision with Lakers management, saying he was "at peace" with the outcome, but he recorded Buss's remark: "We're going in a different direction." But Jackson's thoughts on Bryant caused the most stir. While calling coaching O'Neal "an experience I will cherish forever," his inflammatory comment on Bryant continued to draw attention when Jackson returned for a second coaching stint with the Lakers on June 15, 2005, a six-year run which resulted in three finals appearances and two championships, with Bryant winning the Finals MVP Award on both occasions.
