= 2008 United States men's Olympic basketball team =

2008 United States Men's Olympic basketball team
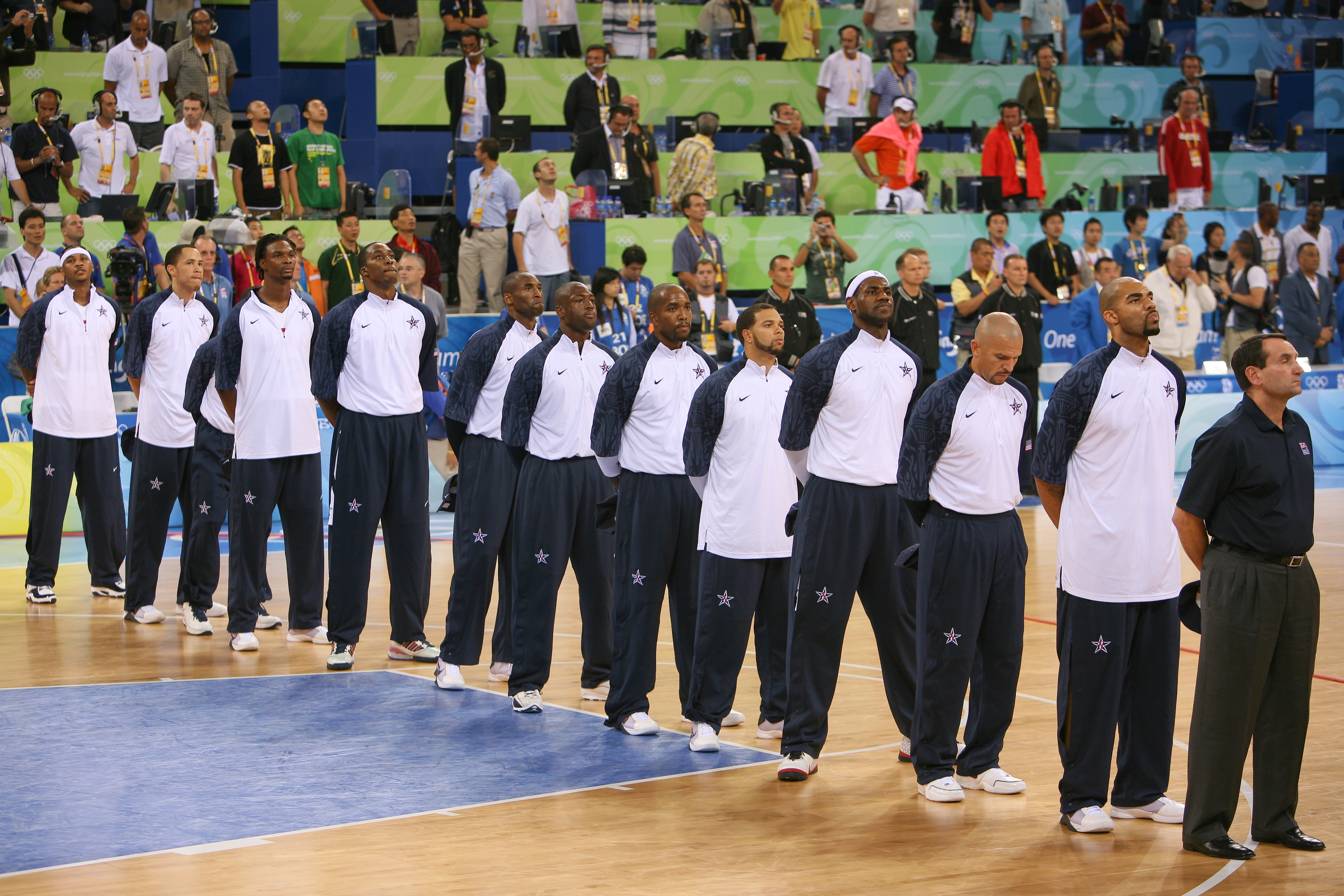
- The US men's Olympic basketball team on August 10, 2008
- Head coach: Mike Krzyzewski
- Scoring leader: (United States) Dwyane Wade 16.0
- Rebounding leader: (United States) Chris Bosh 6.9
- Assists leader: (United States) Chris Paul 4.0

The men's national basketball team of the United States won the gold medal at the 2008 Summer Olympics in Beijing, China. They qualified for the Olympics by winning the 2007 FIBA Americas Championship held in Las Vegas, Nevada. The team was nicknamed the "Redeem Team", a play on the "Dream Team" name for the 1992 U.S. Olympic team, and a reference to the fact that the United States came away with disappointing bronze medals during the 2004 Summer Olympics and the 2006 FIBA World Championship. Former Phoenix Suns chairman and CEO Jerry Colangelo was named managing director of the national team program by the USA Basketball Executive Committee in 2005. Kobe Bryant was named the team captain and Mike Krzyzewski was named the head coach of the 2008 team. An ESPN program, Road to Redemption, followed the team's preparations. Additionally, a Netflix produced documentary titled The Redeem Team was released in 2022.

The United States defeated Spain 118–107 in the final to win the gold. Dwyane Wade was the leading scorer for Team USA, averaging 16 points per game.

After the 2004 Olympics, USA Basketball initiated a long-term project that saw players committing to play for the team long before the start of the 2008 Olympics, instead of hastily accepting invitations merely weeks prior to the start of the tournament. Many 2008 Olympians participated in the 2007 Americas championships, where the US won gold, thus qualifying for the Olympics.

In September 2025, the entire team was inducted into the Naismith Memorial Basketball Hall of Fame, with two of its members, Carmelo Anthony and Dwight Howard, also being inducted as players at that time. With the Hall of Fame inductions, six players (Anthony, Chris Bosh, Bryant, Howard, Jason Kidd, and Wade) and two coaches (Jim Boeheim and Krzyzewski) have been inducted individually into the Naismith Hall of Fame.

== Record ==
=== Preparation Matches: USA Basketball International Challenge ===
July 25, 2008
United States	120 – 65	Canada	Thomas & Mack Center, Las Vegas
July 31, 2008
United States	114 – 82	Turkey	Cotai Arena, Macau
August 1, 2008
United States	120 – 84	Russia	Cotai Arena, Macau
August 3, 2008
United States	89 – 68	Australia	Qizhong Forest Sports City Arena, Shanghai
August 5, 2008
United States	87 – 76	Germany	Qizhong Forest Sports City Arena, Shanghai

=== Preliminary round ===
The team competed in Group B of the preliminary round.

Pos	Team	Pld	W	L	PF	PA	PD	Pts	Qualification
1	United States	5	5	0	515	354	+161	10	Quarterfinals
2	Spain	5	4	1	418	369	+49	9	Quarterfinals
3	Greece	5	3	2	415	375	+40	8	Quarterfinals
4	China (H)	5	2	3	366	400	−34	7	Quarterfinals
5	Germany	5	1	4	330	390	−60	6	
6	Angola	5	0	5	321	477	−156	5	

Source: FIBA archive
Rules for classification: 1) points; 2) head-to-head points; 3) head-to-head goal average; 4) head-to-head number of points scored.
(H) Hosts

August 10, 2008
United States	101 – 70	China	Wukesong Indoor Stadium, Beijing
August 12, 2008
Angola	76 – 97	United States	Wukesong Indoor Stadium, Beijing
August 14, 2008
United States	92 – 69	Greece	Wukesong Indoor Stadium, Beijing
August 16, 2008
Spain	82 – 119	United States	Wukesong Indoor Stadium, Beijing
August 18, 2008
United States	106 – 57	Germany	Wukesong Indoor Stadium, Beijing

=== Tournament bracket ===
Quarterfinals
A1	Lithuania	94
B4	China	68
B2	Spain	72
A3	Croatia	59
B1	United States	116
A4	Australia	85
A2	Argentina	80
B3	Greece	78

Semifinals
A1	Lithuania	86
B2	Spain	91
B1	United States	101
A2	Argentina	81

Final
B2	Spain	107
B1	United States	118
Bronze medal game
A1	Lithuania	75
A2	Argentina	87

== Roster ==
The following is the United States roster in the men's basketball tournament of the 2008 Summer Olympics.

United States men's national basketball team – 2008 Summer Olympics roster
Players
Coaches

Pos.	No.	Name	Age – Date of birth	Height	Club	Ctr.
F	4	Carlos Boozer	26 – November 20, 1981	6 ft 8 in (2.03 m)	Utah Jazz	(United States)
G	5	Jason Kidd	35 – March 23, 1973	6 ft 4 in (1.93 m)	Dallas Mavericks	(United States)
F	6	LeBron James	23 – December 30, 1984	6 ft 8 in (2.03 m)	Cleveland Cavaliers	(United States)
G	7	Deron Williams	24 – June 26, 1984	6 ft 3 in (1.91 m)	Utah Jazz	(United States)
G	8	Michael Redd	28 – August 24, 1979	6 ft 6 in (1.98 m)	Milwaukee Bucks	(United States)
G	9	Dwyane Wade	26 – January 17, 1982	6 ft 4 in (1.93 m)	Miami Heat	(United States)
G	10	Kobe Bryant (C)	29 – August 23, 1978	6 ft 6 in (1.98 m)	Los Angeles Lakers	(United States)
C	11	Dwight Howard	22 – December 8, 1985	6 ft 11 in (2.11 m)	Orlando Magic	(United States)
F/C	12	Chris Bosh	24 – March 24, 1984	6 ft 11 in (2.11 m)	Toronto Raptors	(Canada)
G	13	Chris Paul	23 – May 6, 1985	6 ft 0 in (1.83 m)	New Orleans Hornets	(United States)
F	14	Tayshaun Prince	28 – February 28, 1980	6 ft 9 in (2.06 m)	Detroit Pistons	(United States)
F	15	Carmelo Anthony	24 – May 29, 1984	6 ft 7 in (2.01 m)	Denver Nuggets	(United States)

Head coach

- (United States) Mike Krzyzewski

Assistant coach(es)

- (United States) Jim Boeheim
- (United States) Nate McMillan
- (United States) Mike D'Antoni

Legend

- (C) Team captain
- Club – describes last
  club before the tournament
- Age – describes age
  on August 9, 2008
