= Road to Redemption =

Road to Redemption may refer to:

- Road to Redemption (2001 film) - a 2001 Christian action comedy film produced by World Wide Pictures
- Road to Redemption (2008 film) - a 2008 sports documentary about the U.S. men's national basketball team at the 2008 Summer Olympics
