= Court of Gold =

Basketball documentary series

Court of Gold is a six-part Netflix documentary series chronicling four men's basketball teams at the 2024 Olympic Games in Paris: the United States, France, Serbia, and Canada. It was directed by Jake Rogal.

The series premiered on February 18, 2025. It shows the athletes' journeys, including their challenges, triumphs, and competitions. It was produced in part by Barack and Michelle Obama. Separate production teams were assigned to Teams USA, Canada, Serbia and France.

USA Today called it "a must-see for any NBA or basketball fans." The Athletic predicted that "Court of Gold will emerge as the year’s best sports documentary. It’s that good." The Washington Post wrote that the series "failed to present key plot points that would have contributed to a richer version of events".

The series was produced by Words + Pictures in conjunction with the Olympic Channel and Higher Ground Productions.

== See also ==
- List of basketball films
- The Redeem Team (2022 film)
- Road to Redemption (2008 film)
- Starting 5
