= The Redeem Team (film) =

- Release poster
- Directed by: Jon Weinbach
- Produced by: Greg Groggel; Diego Hurtado de Mendoza; Diane Valera
- Cinematography: Diego Hurtado de Mendoza; Diego Trenas; Michael Winik; Peter Winik
- Edited by: Jeremy Hsu; Charles Olivier; Stephen Yao
- Music by: CAMPFIRE; Shane Eli Abrahams; Jonny Pakfar
- Production companies: 59th & Prairie Entertainment; HBO Theatrical Documentary; Mandalay Sports Media
- Distributed by: Netflix
- Release date: October 7, 2022
- Running time: 90 minutes
- Country: United States
- Language: English

The Redeem Team is a 2022 American documentary film directed by Jon Weinbach that chronicles the 2008 United States men's basketball team's journey during the Beijing Summer Olympics. The film focuses on the team's effort to reclaim its dominance in international basketball after a disappointing bronze medal finish at the 2004 Athens Olympics.

== Synopsis ==
The documentary provides an in-depth look at the preparation, challenges, and triumphs of the U.S. team, featuring prominent players such as Kobe Bryant, LeBron James, and Dwyane Wade. It highlights the transformation of the team's culture under head coach Mike Krzyzewski, who emphasized discipline, teamwork, and a commitment to excellence. The accompanying soundtrack features DJ Jazzy Jeff & the Fresh Prince, Jadakiss, and Public Enemy.

== Production ==
The documentary is produced by Greg Groggel and Diego Hurtado De Mendoza, with executive producers Frank Marshall, Mike Tollin, Jon Weinbach, Dwyane Wade, Mark Parkman, Mary Byrne and Yiannis Exarchos alongside LeBron James, Maverick Carter, Jamal Henderson and Philip Byron of Uninterrupted. The film was directed by Jon Weinbach, who was also involved with The Last Dance.

The film includes archival footage, interviews, and behind-the-scenes access to the team during the 2008 Olympics.

== Release ==
The film was released on Netflix on October 7, 2022.

== Reception ==
On the review aggregator website Rotten Tomatoes, 93% of 14 critics' reviews are positive. Metacritic assigned the film a weighted average score of 76 out of 100, based on 5 critics, indicating "generally favorable reviews".

A.R. Shaw of The Guardian described the film as blending the sports aspect with a patriotic resurgence. The Redeem Team chronicles how the basketball squad restored national pride during a turbulent era. Director Weinbach was quoted saying, "There was not a lot of optimism on America’s place in the world... you’re looking for things to feel good about as an American." The documentary frames the team’s gold medal as both athletic redemption and a metaphor for collective healing.

== See also ==
- Road to Redemption (2008 film)
- Court of Gold
- List of basketball films
