= Road to Redemption (2008 film) =

2008 basketball documentary

Road to Redemption was a 2008 sports documentary presented by Nike that follows the Men's USA Basketball Team as it prepared for the Beijing Olympics.

The documentary included behind-the-scenes footage of the team, how they trained, and what was expected of them at the Olympics.

Five episodes were broadcast from July 2, 2008 to August 5, 2008. The premier was aired on July 2, the second episode on July 21, the third on July 31 and the fourth and fifth on August 5. The program varied form 30 minutes to an hour.

The series was shown on ESPN2 and rebroadcast on ESPN Classic. Following the airing of each episode, additional content was made available on ESPN.com, NBA.com, the NBA YouTube channel, and Nikebasketball.com.

== Broadcast schedule ==
Road To Redemption presented by NIKE
Episode	Date	Time	Network	Length
One	July 2, 2008	7:00 PM ET	ESPN2	1 Hour
Two	July 21, 2008	7:30 PM ET	ESPN2	30 mins
Three	July 31, 2008	7:30 PM ET	ESPN2	30 mins
Four	August 5, 2008	7:00 PM ET	ESPN2	30 mins
Five	August 5, 2008	7:30 PM ET	ESPN2	30 mins

== See also ==
- The Redeem Team (film), 2022 film
- Court of Gold
- List of basketball films
