= List of basketball films =

This is a list of films about basketball, featuring notable films where basketball plays a central role in the development of the plot.

== List ==
Year	Title	Genre	Notes
1927	The Fair Co-Ed	Comedy	Silent film about a college girl (Marion Davies) who plays basketball to romantically pursue the coach.
1938	Campus Confessions	Comedy	A college president's son inspires a bad team and attracts a reporter (Betty Grable).
1946	Double Dribble	Comedy	Disney short starring Goofy playing basketball.
1947	The Big Fix	Drama	Army vet Ken Williams, a basketball hero, is threatened to fix his school's games.
1948	Big Town Scandal	Drama	A newspaper editor agrees to coach a team made up of juvenile delinquents.
1951	The Basketball Fix	Drama	A college player in need of money agrees to shave points for a gambler.
1951	The Harlem Globetrotters	Drama	A new kind of basketball team dazzles audiences with its skills.
1954	Go Man Go	Biographical	Origin of the Harlem Globetrotters, featuring Sidney Poitier as a player.
1960	Tall Story	Comedy	A co-ed (Jane Fonda) tries to win the heart of the team's star (Anthony Perkins).
1961	The Absent-Minded Professor	Comedy	Miracle substance called "Flubber" invented by a college professor (Fred MacMurray) enables school's basketball players to bounce sky-high.
1971	Drive, He Said	Drama	Directed by Jack Nicholson, story of a college player who becomes a campus activist.
1973	Maurie	Biographical	Life-changing injury's impact on NBA teammates Maurice Stokes and Jack Twyman.
1974	Mixed Company	Comedy	A Phoenix Suns coach and his wife adopt children of various ethnic backgrounds.
1975	Cornbread, Earl and Me	Drama	Teen about to get basketball scholarship (Jamaal Wilkes) is mistaken for a criminal and shot by the police.
1977	One on One	Drama	A highly recruited college freshman (Robby Benson) runs afoul of a demanding coach.
1978	Coach	Drama	A basketball coach (Cathy Lee Crosby) hired by mistake is harassed by her superior.
1979	The American Game	Documentary	Follows two high school basketball players from different backgrounds
1979	Fast Break	Comedy	Gabe Kaplan as a New Yorker who dreams of being a coach and finally gets a shot.
1979	The Fish That Saved Pittsburgh	Comedy	A laughing-stock basketball squad transforms itself as the Pittsburgh Pisces.
1979	The Great Santini	Drama	A high school star's life is complicated by his father (Robert Duvall), a mean Marine.
1980	Inside Moves	Drama	When a bartender's injury heals, he becomes a player for the Golden State Warriors.
1982	That Championship Season	Drama	A reunion of a Pennsylvania state championship team turns into an angry confrontation, starring Robert Mitchum and Bruce Dern.
1985	Teen Wolf	Comedy	A slapstick comedy starring Michael J. Fox about a high schooler who discovers that he turns into a werewolf.
1986	Hoosiers	Drama	Gene Hackman in story based loosely on the 1953–54 Milan High School basketball team.
1987	Amazing Grace and Chuck	Drama	An NBA superstar (real-life NBA star Alex English) joins the anti-nuclear protest of a Montana Little League pitcher.
1991	The Pistol: The Birth of a Legend	Drama	Biographical film based on the early life of Pete Maravich.
1991	Heaven Is a Playground	Drama	Based on Rick Telander's book of the same name, a coach and lawyer team up to help an urban high school team stay out of trouble.
1992	American Citizen	Drama	Film about the friendship of an American basketball player playing in Israel and an Israeli sports journalist
1992	White Men Can't Jump	Comedy	Outdoor court hustlers (Wesley Snipes, Woody Harrelson) con opponents as well as each other.
1992	Final Shot: The Hank Gathers Story	Drama	TV biographical film about doomed Loyola Marymount star.
1993	Hardwood Dreams	Documentary	Wesley Snipes narrates a look at a Los Angeles-area high school team.
1994	Blue Chips	Drama	Nick Nolte as a successful college coach who violates the rules to recruit new stars.
1994	Hoop Dreams	Documentary	A pair of Chicago high school athletes try to succeed on the court and make it to college.
1994	Above the Rim	Drama	Story about a New York high school player who falls in with a bad crowd.
1994	The Air Up There	Comedy	Kevin Bacon as a college coach who goes to Africa searching for new talent.
1994	The St. Tammany Miracle	Family	Story of an Episcopalian all-girl team.
1995	The Basketball Diaries	Drama	Based on Jim Carroll's harrowing true story of drug addiction starring Leonardo DiCaprio.
1995	Forget Paris	Rom-com	A temperamental NBA referee (Billy Crystal) tries to make his new marriage work.
1995	Slam Dunk Ernest	Comedy	Featuring the character played in many films by Jim Varney.
1996	Space Jam	Animation/Comedy	Combines live action and animation, featuring Michael Jordan and Bugs Bunny.
1996	Eddie	Comedy	Whoopi Goldberg as a New York Knicks fan who becomes their head coach.
1996	Celtic Pride	Comedy	Boston fans (Daniel Stern and Dan Aykroyd) kidnap opposition's top player (Damon Wayans).
1996	Sunset Park	Drama	A woman (Rhea Perlman) becomes coach of an all-male team.
1996	Rebound: The Legend of Earl "The Goat" Manigault	Biographical	Film starring Don Cheadle as the New York playground legend.
1997	Air Bud	Comedy	Family adventure about a basketball-playing dog.
1997	The 6th Man	Comedy	Ghost of a teammate returns to inspire a University of Washington player.
1997	Soul in the Hole	Documentary	About aspiring basketball coach Kenny Jones, and his team "Kenny's Kings"
1998	My Giant	Comedy	A man nearly 8 feet tall (Gheorghe Mureșan) is found by a guy (Billy Crystal) with big ideas.
1998	Gunnin' for That #1 Spot	Documentary	The film by Adam Yauch follows 8 of the top high school basketball players.
1998	Bad As I Wanna Be: The Dennis Rodman Story	Drama	TV film, biographical film of NBA star.
1998	He Got Game	Drama	An imprisoned man (Denzel Washington) tries to convince his son, a top-ranked high school basketball player, to attend the governor's college alma mater in return for a reduced sentence.
1998	City Dump: The Story of the 1951 CCNY Basketball Scandal	Documentary	HBO's look at a New York college team's point-shaving scandal.
1999	Game Day	Drama	Little-known dark drama. Haunted by the loss of five championship titles, alcoholic coach Richard Lewis gets a chance at redemption in a small college second-rate program with an obsessed fan.
1999	Michael Jordan: An American Hero	Drama	Biographical film of former NBA great.
1999	Passing Glory	Drama	A 1960s priest (Andre Braugher) organizes a game between racially segregated teams.
1999	That Championship Season	Drama	Remake of 1982 film, based on Pulitzer Prize-winning play by Jason Miller.
2000	Love & Basketball	Romance	Male and female basketball players attend USC together and fall in love.
2000	Michael Jordan to the Max	Documentary	IMAX documentary narrated by Laurence Fishburne.
2000	Finding Forrester	Drama	A reclusive author (Sean Connery) mentors a prep-school student-athlete.
2001	The Luck of the Irish	Comedy	TV family film about a junior high school student who discovers his Irish heritage.
2001	O	Drama	An adaptation of Othello, updated to a modern American high school and its team.
2002	Juwanna Mann	Rom-com	A basketball player becomes a female impersonator.
2002	The Red Sneakers	Fantasy	TV film about a player with a lucky pair of shoes, directed by Gregory Hines.
2002	Like Mike	Comedy	Magical shoes turn a 14-year-old (Lil' Bow Wow) into a basketball sensation.
2002	A Season on the Brink	Drama	TV film based on the book, documenting 1985–86 season of Bob Knight and Indiana University.
2002	Double Teamed	Biographical	Disney Channel biopic of Heather and Heidi Burge, twins from Palos Verdes who end up in the WNBA.
2002	Crossing the Line	Drama	A coach of a girls' team clashes with angry parents.
2002	Something to Cheer About	Documentary	About the Crispus Attucks Tigers, first all-black high school team to win a state championship against white teams, behind future NBA star Oscar Robertson.
2003	Full-Court Miracle	Family	Story of a team from a Hebrew academy in a big tournament.
2004	Sky Walker – The David Thompson Story	Documentary	A look at North Carolina State and NBA star David Thompson.
2004	The Year of the Yao	Documentary	Chronicles Yao Ming's first season in the NBA.
2004	The Cookout	Comedy	A neighbor tries to get even with a New Jersey Nets player by selling memorabilia.
2005	Rebound	Comedy	A coach banned from college ball (Martin Lawrence) ends up teaching middle-school kids.
2005	Coach Carter	Drama	Based on a true story, starring Samuel L. Jackson as a high school coach.
2005	The Heart of the Game	Documentary	Behind-the-scenes look at a Seattle high school girls team.
2005	Through the Fire	Documentary	Shows the life of Sebastian Telfair, who has to decide between playing for Louisville or heading straight to the NBA
2005	Hardwood	Documentary	Hubert Davis reflects on his Harlem Globetrotters player father.
2006	Church Ball	Comedy	A bishop recruits Dennis Buckstead to coach a group of non-playing basketball players
2006	Crossover	Action	A college student tries to concentrate on both basketball and medical school.
2006	Like Mike 2	Comedy	Direct-to-DVD sequel to Like Mike.
2006	Glory Road	Drama	Based on the true story of the 1965–66 Texas Western College team.
2006	Believe in Me	Drama	Assigned to an Oklahoma girls' team against his will, coach takes it to state title game.
2007	Home of the Giants	Crime drama	A robbery creates complications for an Indiana high school team.
2007	Quantum Hoops	Documentary	Caltech's team tries to end 21-year losing streak in conference play during 2005–06 season.
2007	Dribbles	Drama	
2008	Slam	Action	Chinese film about three youths facing their rivals at an Adidas street basketball tournament
2008	The First Basket	Documentary	Explores the influence of professional basketball on Jewish culture.
2008	Game of Change	Documentary	A segregated Mississippi State team, defying a court order, plays integrated Loyola Chicago in the 1963 NCAA tournament. Produced and directed by Jerald Harkness, son of 1963 Loyola star Jerry Harkness.
2008	Road to Redemption	Documentary	Nike-produced film.
2008	Semi-Pro	Comedy	The owner/coach/player (Will Ferrell) of a hapless American Basketball Association team makes various attempts to increase wins, and attendance.
2008	Ball Don't Lie	Indie	Based on the novel of the same name, it showcases the life of Sticky (Grayson Boucher), who struggles with OCD and emotional traumas but is talented on the court.
2009	Hurricane Season	Drama	Based on true story of a Louisiana coach (Forest Whitaker) rebuilding after Hurricane Katrina.
2009	Kobe Doin' Work	Documentary	TV movie directed by Spike Lee that focuses on one day in the life of NBA superstar Kobe Bryant.
2009	The Mighty Macs	Drama	Based on 1972 Immaculata College women's team, coached by Cathy Rush, that won first official women's national championship.
2009	More Than a Game	Documentary	Chronicles the high school careers of LeBron James and four of his hometown friends.
2009	Sonicsgate	Documentary	Explores the controversial relocation of the Seattle SuperSonics to Oklahoma City.
2009	No Crossover: The Trial of Allen Iverson	Documentary	Made for TV as part of ESPN's 30 for 30 series. A look at a fight and subsequent trial when Allen Iverson was in high school.
2009	The Winning Season	Comedy	A has-been coach (Sam Rockwell) with a drinking problem takes over a girls' varsity team.
2009	Streetballers	Indie	Tells the story of a friendship between two junior college basketball players from different backgrounds
2010	Just Wright	Romance	A physical therapist (Queen Latifah) falls for a player from NBA's New Jersey Nets.
2010	Without Bias	Documentary	Made for TV as part of ESPN's 30 for 30 series. Explores career of Len Bias and his death from a cocaine overdose shortly after he was selected in the 1986 NBA draft.
2010	Guru of Go	Documentary	Made for TV as part of ESPN's 30 for 30 series. On 1985–1990 coaching tenure of Paul Westhead at Loyola Marymount, team's frenzied offensive pace and star players Hank Gathers and Bo Kimble.
2010	Once Brothers	Documentary	Made for TV as part of ESPN's 30 for 30 series. Story of Croat Dražen Petrović and Serb Vlade Divac, teammates on the Yugoslavia national team, and how the Yugoslav Wars broke their friendship.
2010	Winning Time: Reggie Miller vs. the New York Knicks	Documentary	Made for TV as part of ESPN's 30 for 30 series. A look at Reggie Miller's rivalry with New York Knicks in 1990s, especially 1994 and 1995 playoffs and interaction with Knicks fan Spike Lee.
2011	The Fab Five	Documentary	Made for TV follow-up to ESPN's 30 for 30 series. Documents the University of Michigan's early-1990s Fab Five ups and downs.
2011	Off the Rez	Documentary	Made for TV. Focuses on high school career of future WNBA player Shoni Schimmel, a Native American who grew up on an Oregon reservation.
2011	Unguarded	Documentary	Made for TV follow-up to ESPN's 30 for 30 series. Chronicles life and career of former NBA player Chris Herren, battle with drug addiction and ongoing recovery.
2012	The Announcement	Documentary	Made for TV follow-up to ESPN's 30 for 30 series. About the impact of Magic Johnson's 1991 announcement that he had tested positive for HIV.
2012	Benji	Documentary	Examines 1984 killing of Ben Wilson, a high school superstar from Chicago's South Side.
2012	Ginger: More than a Game	Documentary	Serbian documentary on the life and impact of Radivoj Korać, credited with establishing basketball as a major sport in the former Yugoslavia.
2012	Long Shot: The Kevin Laue Story	Documentary	Kevin Laue, despite being born with an arm that ends below the elbow, gets the chance to be a basketball player.
2012	The Other Dream Team	Documentary	On the resurrection of the Lithuania national team after restoration of the country's independence in 1990, and its journey to the 1992 Olympics.
2012	There's No Place Like Home	Documentary	Made for TV as a part of ESPN's 30 for 30 series looking at the attempt to bring James Naismith's Original Rules of Basketball back to the University of Kansas, where Naismith worked for over 40 years.
2012	Thunderstruck	Family	A teenager who idolizes Kevin Durant (who stars as himself) switches talents with the NBA star, becoming a phenom while Durant is mired in a slump.
2012	Winning Favor	Drama	Two childhood friends meet each other in the state championship.
2012	Dream Team 1935	Drama	Little-known true story of origins of basketball in Europe, culminating with first European Basketball Championship tournament, held in Geneva, Switzerland in 1935.
2013	Bernie and Ernie	Documentary	Made for TV as part of ESPN's 30 for 30 series. About friendship between NBA players Bernard King and Ernie Grunfeld, which began when both played for the Tennessee Volunteers in the 1970s.
2013	Free Spirits	Documentary	Made for TV as a part of ESPN's 30 for 30 series taking a look at The Spirits of St. Louis ABA basketball team, and how the team's owners kept them involved with the NBA for decades after the Spirits folded.
2013	The Hot Flashes	Comedy	Middle-aged women challenge the state high school champs.
2013	Linsanity	Documentary	On the sudden fame of NBA guard Jeremy Lin.
2013	Medora	Documentary	Struggles of an Indiana high school with just 70 students.
2013	Survive and Advance	Documentary	Made for TV as part of ESPN's 30 for 30 series. A 30-year retrospective on North Carolina State's improbable run to win the 1983 ACC and NCAA tournaments.
2013	Swoopes	Documentary	Made for TV as part of ESPN's Nine for IX series. A look at Sheryl Swoopes, sometimes called the female Michael Jordan.
2013	Pat XO	Documentary	Made for TV as part of ESPN's Nine for IX. Examines the Tennessee coach Pat Summitt and her battle with early-onset Alzheimer's.
2013	The Doctor	Documentary	NBA TV documentary about the ABA and NBA career of Julius Erving.
2013	Coach	Documentary	Made for TV short film - part of ESPN's Nine for IX. Examines renowned basketball coach C. Vivian Stringer.
2014	Jayhawkers	Biographical	Phog Allen, head coach of the Kansas Jayhawks men's basketball team recruits Wilt Chamberlain.
2014	1000 to 1: The Cory Weissman Story	Drama	Direct-to-DVD film based on the real story of Cory Weissman, a high school star who suffered a stroke while at Gettysburg College, and his battle to return to the court despite initial paralysis.
2014	Bad Boys	Documentary	Made for TV as part of ESPN's 30 for 30 series. A look back at the Detroit Pistons of late 1980s and early 1990s.
2014	Nowitzki: The Perfect Shot	Documentary	German film on development of Dirk Nowitzki into an NBA superstar, featuring shooting coach Holger Geschwindner.
2014	Playing for the Mob	Documentary	Made for TV as part of ESPN's 30 for 30 series. Explores how Mafia associate Henry Hill orchestrated a massive point-shaving scheme at Boston College.
2014	Requiem for the Big East	Documentary	Made for TV as part of ESPN's 30 for 30 series. A history of the Big East Conference, founded in the same year as ESPN itself, examining what led to its 2013 split into two leagues.
2014	When the Garden Was Eden	Documentary	Made for TV as part of ESPN's 30 for 30 series. A look back at early-1970s teams of the New York Knicks.
2014	Villinam	Drama	A college student in India fights the cricket establishment to start a basketball program.
2015	Down in the Valley	Documentary	Made for TV as part of ESPN's 30 for 30 series. A look back at the fight of Sacramento and its mayor, former NBA star Kevin Johnson, to keep the Kings from moving to Seattle. Not aired as scheduled on October 20, 2015.
2015	I Hate Christian Laettner	Documentary	Made for TV as part of ESPN's 30 for 30 series. Examines the life and career of Christian Laettner, and intense dislike some fans still harbor toward the former Duke star, more than 20 years after his last game for the Blue Devils.
2015	Sole Man	Documentary	Made for TV as part of ESPN's 30 for 30 series. Explores the rise of Sonny Vaccaro from Pennsylvania steel-town roots to his prominent position in the basketball and athletic shoe industry.
2015	Son of the Congo	Documentary	Explores the journey of Serge Ibaka from childhood in war-torn Republic of the Congo to NBA stardom.
2015	Brotherly Love	Drama	Follows high school basketball player Sergio Taylor as he deals with the fame that comes with being a star athlete and coming from a family with faded aspirations.
2015	We Will Be the World Champions	Drama	Serbian film about the development of basketball in the former Yugoslavia, culminating in the national team's victory in the 1970 FIBA World Championship.
2016	Giants of Africa	Documentary	Profiles Masai Ujiri's philanthropic efforts to promote the development and expansion of basketball in Africa.
2016	One & Done	Documentary	Made for TV. Explores the life of Australian prospect and eventual NBA player Ben Simmons, focusing on his only season at LSU.
2016	Phi Slama Jama	Documentary	Made for TV as part of ESPN's 30 for 30 series. A look back at the University of Houston's iconic Phi Slama Jama team of the 1980s.
2016	This Magic Moment	Documentary	Made for TV as part of ESPN's 30 for 30 series. A look back at the 1990s Orlando Magic and cultural phenomenon inspired by Shaquille O'Neal and Penny Hardaway.
2016	Wolves	Drama	Gambling of a college professor (Michael Shannon) complicates life for his son, a high school basketball star.
2017	The Carter Effect	Documentary	Explores the impact of Vince Carter's stint playing for the Toronto Raptors.
2017	Hoops Africa: Ubuntu Matters	Documentary	From the first-ever NBA game held in South Africa to the streets of Zimbabwe, this film explores the dreams of a young player and a nonprofit that uses basketball as a force of good. Witness the power of Ubuntu and how it can change the world. Narrated by NBA Hall of Fame Hakeem Olajuwon.
2017	Celtics/Lakers: Best of Enemies	Documentary	Three-part documentary made for TV as part of ESPN's 30 for 30 series. Examines the Celtics–Lakers rivalry, including its impact on the NBA as a whole.
2017	Disgraced	Documentary	A made-for-TV examination of the 2003 murder of Baylor player Patrick Dennehy by a teammate and the massive violations of NCAA rules uncovered in its wake.
2017	Going Vertical	Drama	Film about the controversial victory of the Soviet national team over the US Olympic team, ending the USA's 63-game winning streak, at the 1972 Summer Olympics in Munich.
2017	My Other Home	Biography	Chinese film about Stephon Marbury and his career resurrection in China.
2017	On the Map	Documentary	A 40-year retrospective of the 1976–77 season of Maccabi Tel Aviv, who in the words of their New Jersey-born star Tal Brody put Israel "on the map" with victory in that season's European Champions Cup.
2017	One and Not Done	Documentary	Made for TV as part of ESPN's 30 for 30 series. Explores the life and career of John Calipari against the backdrop of his 2015–16 Kentucky team.
2017	Slamma Jamma	Drama	A once promising college basketball player (Chris Staples) is released from prison after serving six years in prison for armed robbery.
2018	Finding Big Country	Documentary	Filmmaker Kathleen Jayme attempts to track down the whereabouts of former Vancouver Grizzlies player Bryant "Big Country" Reeves following his retirement from basketball.
2018	The Last Days of Knight	Documentary	Made as part of ESPN's 30 for 30 series and initially released on the company's new ESPN+ streaming service. A retrospective of the events leading to Indiana University's 2000 firing of Bob Knight, directed by the reporter whose investigation led to Knight's dismissal.
2018	Uncle Drew	Comedy	A streetball coach loses the team he planned to enter in a big tournament, and turns to an elderly group of players in a desperate bid to win the tournament. Spin-off of a series of Pepsi Max commercials featuring NBA star Kyrie Irving as the title character; also features Hall of Fame players Lisa Leslie, Reggie Miller, and Shaquille O'Neal as well as many other prominent basketball figures.
2018	Warrior Pride	Drama	The head coach of a Michigan-based AAU basketball team pursues a national championship while helping his players navigate the ups and downs of life on and off the court.
2019	The Dominican Dream	Documentary	Made for TV as part of ESPN's 30 for 30 series. A look at the life and career of Felipe López, the son of Dominican immigrants who enjoyed great success in high school and college, and the contentment he finds after a middling professional career.
2019	Rodman: For Better or Worse	Documentary	Made for TV as part of ESPN's 30 for 30 series. An unrestrained look at the life and career of Dennis Rodman.
2019	High Flying Bird	Drama	During a pro basketball lockout, a sports agent pitches a rookie basketball client on an intriguing and controversial business proposition.
2020	Events Transpiring Before, During and After a High School Basketball Game	Comedy	The travails of an unsuccessful high school basketball team and the school they play for.
2020	Basketball County: In the Water	Documentary	A look into youth basketball in Prince George's County, Maryland, an area that has produced a significant number of talented basketball players such as Kevin Durant and Victor Oladipo
2020	One of Ours	Documentary	Profiles Josiah Wilson, a young Black Canadian man who was adopted and raised by a First Nations family but was rejected for participation in a 2016 indigenous basketball tournament on the grounds that he is not indigenous by birth.
2020	The Way Back	Drama	An alcoholic construction worker (Ben Affleck) is recruited to become head coach of the basketball team at the high school he used to star for.
2021	Boogie	Drama	A basketball phenom (Taylor Takahashi) struggles to balance the pressure from his traditional East Asian parents to earn a scholarship to an elite college over chasing his NBA dreams.
2021	Breakaway	Documentary	Made for TV as part of ESPN's 30 for 30 series. At the height of her career, WNBA superstar Maya Moore walked away from her sport to work toward freeing a man whom many believed to have been wrongfully convicted—a quest that would change her life in unexpected ways.
2021	Handle With Care: The Legend of the Notic Streetball Crew	Documentary	Documentary about a streetball crew in Vancouver, British Columbia, Canada.
2021	NBA Films for Fans	Documentary	Anthology of five short documentary films about basketball, created to mark the 75th anniversary of the first-ever National Basketball Association game.
2021	Space Jam: A New Legacy	Animation/Comedy	Combines live action and animation, featuring LeBron James and Bugs Bunny.
2022	Dream On	Documentary	Three-part documentary made for TV as part of ESPN's 30 for 30 series. A look at the 1996 United States women's Olympic basketball team, which dominated the competition at the Atlanta Olympics and contributed to the creation of the WNBA the next year.
2022	Golden Delicious	Coming-of-age drama	A Chinese-Canadian teenager comes to terms with social expectations when he falls in love with his basketball teammate.
2022	The Greatest Mixtape Ever	Documentary	Part of ESPN's 30 for 30 series. Examines the sporting and cultural impact of 1990s streetball and the AND1 Mixtape Tour.
2022	The Grizzlie Truth	Documentary	Filmmaker Kathleen Jayme investigates the decline and collapse of the Vancouver Grizzlies.
2022	Hustle	Comedy/Drama	An NBA scout (Adam Sandler) discovers an unknown player in Spain (Juancho Hernangómez) and brings him back to United States to prepare for the upcoming NBA draft.
2022	Rise	Docudrama	Disney+ release about the rise of the Antetokounmpo brothers from struggles as the sons of Nigerian immigrants to Greece to basketball prominence—and in the case of Giannis, NBA mega-stardom.
2022	The First Slam Dunk	Anime/Drama	Japanese animated film based on the sports manga series Slam Dunk.
2022	The Redeem Team	Documentary	Tells the story of the 2008 USA Men's Basketball Olympic team
2023	Hello Universe!	Fantasy/Comedy	A middle-aged man gets to live the life he wanted when a magical figure grants his wish of being a successful basketball coach.
2023	Air	Drama	The origin of the Air Jordan shoe brand.
2023	Champions	Comedy	A temperamental minor-league basketball coach who after an arrest must coach a team of players with intellectual disabilities as community service.
2023	Chang Can Dunk	Drama	Chang, a 16-year-old Asian American high school student in band, bets the school basketball star that he can dunk by homecoming.
2023	The Hidden Court	Documentary	The story of a group of 11 men from Northern Westchester, NY who, during the height of the COVID-19 pandemic, when gyms were closed and rims taken off outdoor courts, found a sense of community and camaraderie by playing 'prohibition basketball' on a hidden outdoor court.
2023	Lady Ballers	Comedy	Jeremy Boreing plays a down-on-his-luck-coach who will do anything to win, even bring his old male basketball team together to compete in women's sports.
2023	The Luckiest Guy in the World	Documentary	Made for TV as part of ESPN's 30 for 30 series. Four-part series exploring the life of Bill Walton, from his start as a high school phenom through dominance at UCLA, an injury-riddled NBA career, social activism, and sometimes-controversial basketball commentary.
2023	Shooting Stars	Drama	A Peacock original biopic about LeBron James' high school years.
2023	Warrior Strong	Drama	An aspiring professional basketball player is asked by his former high school principal to return to the school as assistant to the head basketball coach.
2023	White Men Can't Jump	Comedy	American remake of the 1992 film.
2023	Sweetwater	Drama	Biopic about Nat Clifton, the first African-American to sign a contract with the NBA.
2024	Rez Ball	Drama	The Chuska Warriors, a Native American high school basketball team from New Mexico, must band together after losing their star player to keep their quest for a state championship alive.
2025	Court of Gold	Documentary	A six-part Netflix documentary series chronicling four men's basketball teams at the 2024 Olympic Games in Paris.
2025	All-Star Weekend	Comedy	Two friends find themselves fans of opposing NBA stars LeBron James and Stephen Curry.
2025	King's Court	Short documentary	Two friends in Toronto regularly meet to play pick-up basketball on the neighbourhood courts in St. James Town.
2025	Saints and Warriors	Documentary	A Haida basketball team prepares to compete in the All Native Basketball Tournament.
2025	Volunteer for Life	Documentary	Part of ESPN's SEC Storied series, looking back at how Tennessee men's star Chris Lofton played his final Volunteers season in 2007–08 while undergoing treatment for testicular cancer.
2026	48 Hours in Vegas	Biography	Inspired by the story of how NBA star Dennis Rodman went on a madcap adventure in the middle of the 1998 NBA Finals.
2026	GOAT	Animation/comedy	In a world of anthropomorphic animals, a young goat makes a name for himself in roarball, that world's version of basketball. Co-produced by Stephen Curry, with Curry, Andre Iguodala, Kevin Love, Angel Reese, Dwyane Wade, and A'ja Wilson all voicing characters.
2026	King of the South	Biography	TBA

== List of highest grossing basketball films ==
The following is a list of basketball films that surpass $1 million. Looney Tunes is the most frequent franchise with 2 films on the list.

2021 is the most frequent year with 2 films on the list. 98% of the films played since 1970 and films that have not played since then do not appear on the chart due to ticket price inflation, population size, and ticket purchasing trends not being considered.

List of highest grossing basketball films
Rank	Film	Box office	Year	Ref.
1	Space Jam	$230,594,962	1996	
2	Goat †	$190,564,590	2025	
3	Space Jam: A New Legacy	$163,692,228	2021	
4	Going Vertical	$108,613,501	2017	
5	White Men Can't Jump	$90,753,806	1991	
6	Air	$90,060,106	2023	
7	Finding Forrester	$80,049,764	2000	
8	Teen Wolf	$80,000,000	1985	
9	Coach Carter	$76,669,892	2005	
10	Like Mike	$62,274,780	2002	
11	Forget Paris	$56,000,000	1995	
12	Uncle Drew	$46,664,414	2018	
13	Semi-Pro	$44,004,502	2008	
14	Glory Road	$42,938,449	2006	
15	Eddie	$31,387,164	1996	
16	Love & Basketball	$27,743,596	2000	
17	Air Bud	$23,144,499	1997	
18	Blue Chips	$26,000,000	1994	
19	The Absent-Minded Professor	$25,381,407	1961	
20	Champions	$21,899,506	2023	
21	He Got Game	$21,567,853	1998	
22	Michael Jordan to the Max	$21,520,596	2000	
23	The Air Up There	$21,011,318	1994	
24	Best Shot	$28,607,524	1986	
25	Just Wright	$21,584,424	2010	
26	One by One	$20,000,000	1979	
27	O	$19,260,537	2001	
28	Rebound	$17,492,014	2005	
29	Above the Rim	$16,192,320	1994	
30	The Way Back	$15,490,514	2020	
31	The 6th Man	$14,772,788	1997	
32	Juwanna Mann	$13,802,599	2002	
33	The Cookout	$12,009,070	2004	
34	Hoop Dreams	$11,830,611	1994	
35	Sunset Park	$10,163,782	1996	
36	Crossover	$7,009,668	2006	
37	Celtic Pride	$9,255,027	1996	
38	The Fish That Saved Pittsburgh	$8,281,246	1979	
39	My Giant	$8,072,007	1998	
40	The Hot Flashes	$5,600,000	2013	
41	Silent Voice	$5,400,000	1987	
42	The Great Santini	$4,702,575	1979	
43	Boogie	$4,191,023	2021	
44	The Basketball Diaries	$2,402,438	1994	
45	Cornbread, Earl and Me	$2,020,000	1975	
46	The Mighty Macs	$1,891,936	2009	
47	Tall Story	$1,700,000	1960	
48	Inside Moves	$1,200,000	1980	

== See also ==
- List of sports films
- List of highest-grossing sports films
