= Academy of Television Arts & Sciences =

American television organization

Coordinates: 34°09′59″N 118°22′28″W

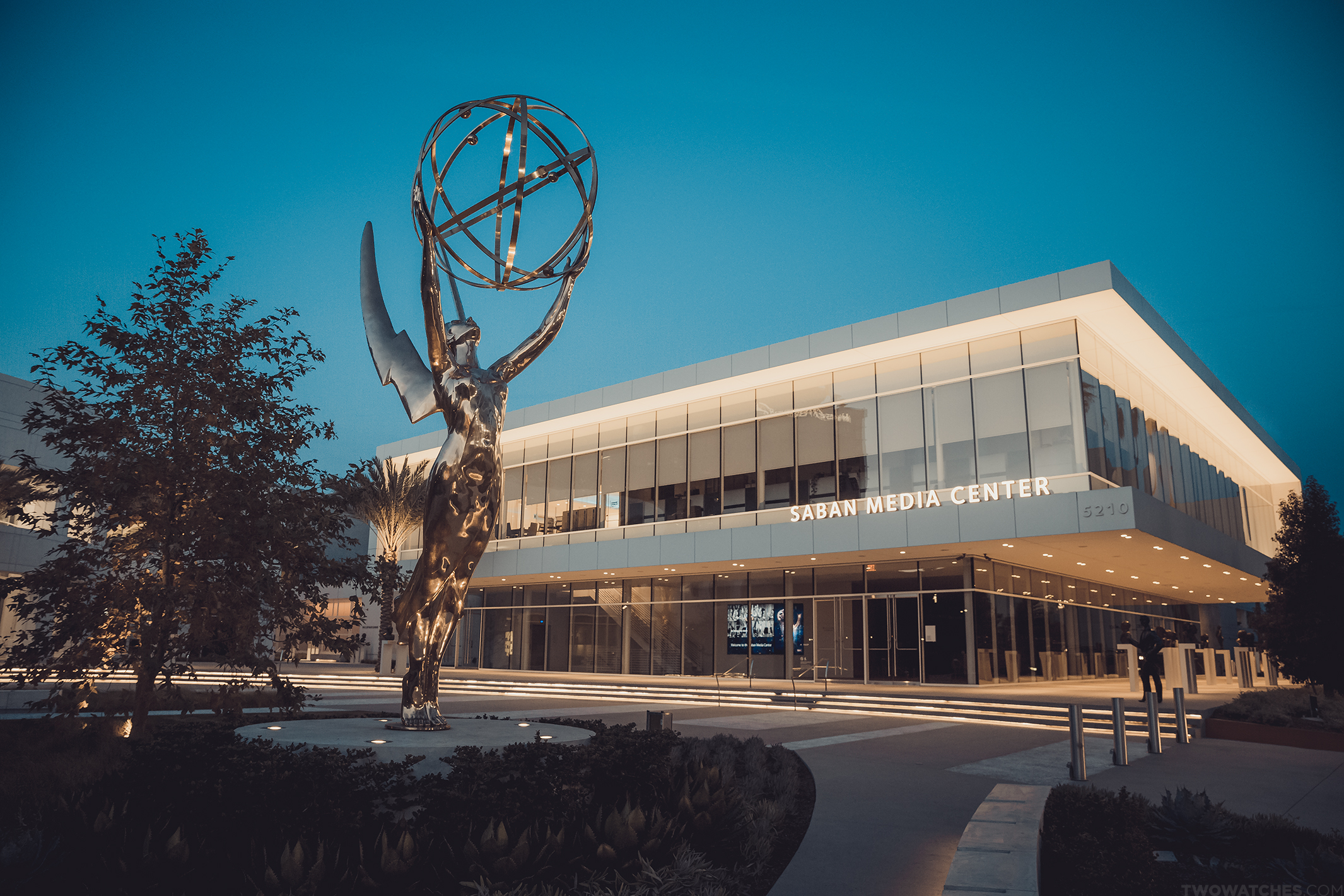
- Founded: 1946; 80 years ago
- Tax ID no.: 95-3130853
- Legal status: 501(c)(6)
- Location(s): North Hollywood, California, United States
- Region served: Television industry
- Product: Primetime Emmy Award
- Key people: Cris Abrego (Chairman)
- Revenue: $36,921,627 (2019)
- Website: televisionacademy.com

The Academy of Television Arts & Sciences (ATAS), also colloquially known as the Television Academy, is a professional honorary organization dedicated to the advancement of the television industry in the United States. A 501(c)(6) non-profit organization founded in 1946, the organization presents the Primetime Emmy Awards, an annual ceremony honoring achievement in U.S. primetime television. The ATAS is a sister organization to the National Academy of Television Arts and Sciences and the International Academy of Television Arts and Sciences, the other two bodies that present Emmy Awards to other sectors of television programming.

== History ==
Syd Cassyd considered television a beneficial tool for education and envisioned an organization that would act outside the "flash and glamor" of the industry and become an outlet for "serious discussion" and award the industry's "finest achievements". Envisioning a television counterpart of the Academy of Motion Picture Arts and Sciences, Cassyd founded the Academy of Television Arts & Sciences in 1946 in conjunction with leaders of the early television industry who had gathered at a meeting he organized.

Cassyd's academy in Los Angeles merged with a New York academy founded by Ed Sullivan in 1955 to form the National Academy of Television Arts and Sciences. The Los Angeles chapter broke away from NATAS in 1977, keeping the Primetime and Los Angeles Emmys.

In 2014, alongside its Hall of Fame induction ceremony and announced plans to expand its headquarters, the organization announced that it had changed its public brand to the Television Academy, with a new logo designed by Siegel + Gale. The new branding was intended to downplay the organization's antiquated formal name in favor of a more straightforward identity, and features a separating line (typically used to separate the organization's wordmark from a simplified image of the Emmy Award statuette) used to symbolize a screen, and also portrayed as a "portal".

In 2016, producer Hayma Washington was elected chairman and CEO of the Academy of Arts and Sciences, becoming the first African-American to hold the position.

In June 2026, the ATAS and the NATAS announced that they have begun exploratory discussions to re-merge.

== Emmy Award ==
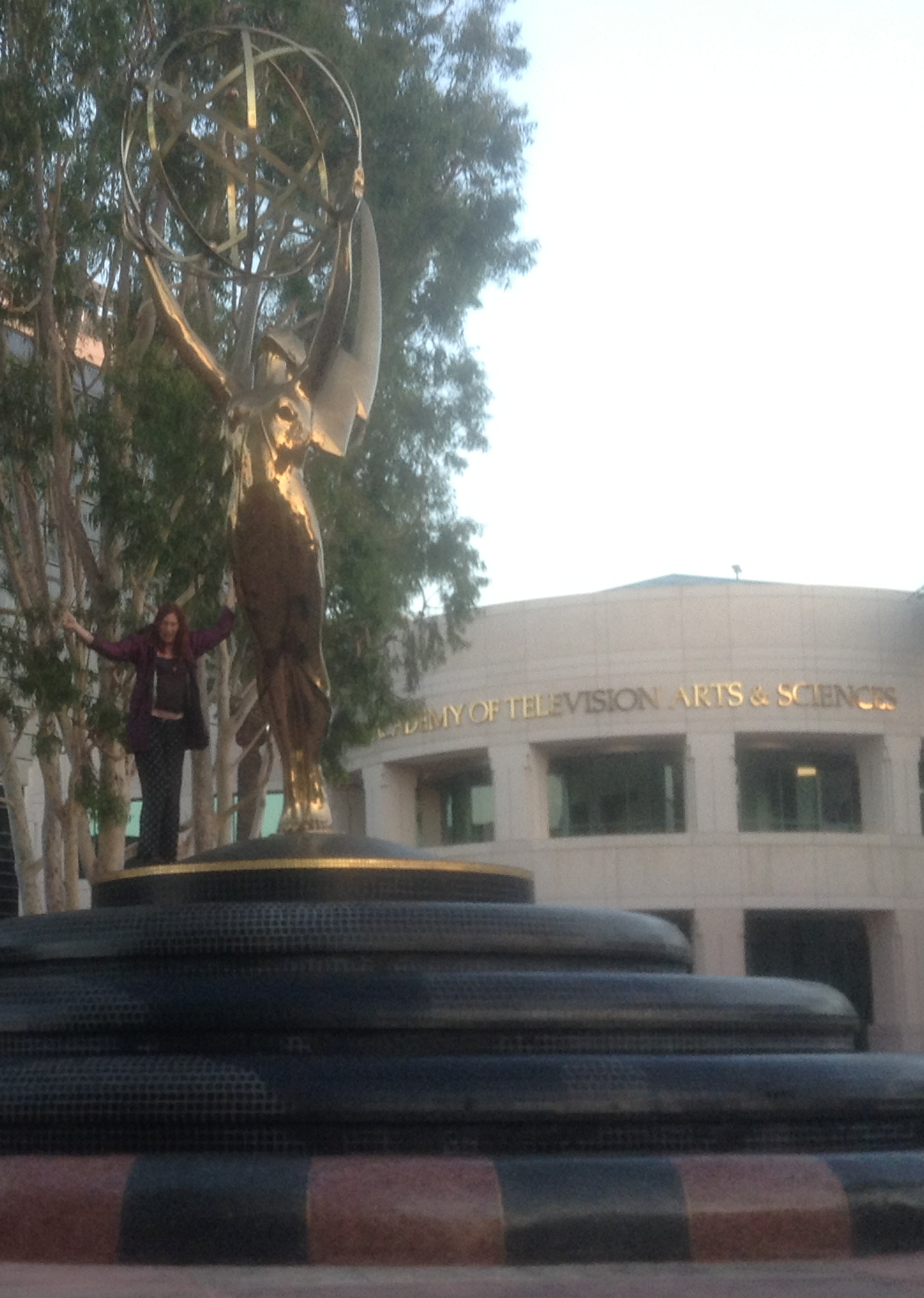
The courtyard and Emmy Award statue at the Academy of Television Arts & Sciences facility on Lankershim

In 1949, the Television Academy held the first Emmy Awards ceremony, an annual event created to recognize excellence in U.S. television programming, although the initial event was restricted to programming from the Los Angeles area. The name "Emmy" was derived from "Immy", a nickname for the image orthicon camera tube, which aided the progress of modern television. The word was feminized as "Emmy" to match the statuette, which depicted a winged woman holding an atom.

== Sister organizations ==
The Emmy Awards are administered by three sister organizations that focus on various sectors of television programming: the Academy of Television Arts & Sciences (primetime), the National Academy of Television Arts and Sciences (daytime, sports, news and documentary), and the International Academy of Television Arts and Sciences (international). The Academy of Television Arts & Sciences also presents the Los Angeles Emmy Awards.

== Publications and programs ==
In addition to recognizing outstanding programming through its Primetime Emmy Awards, the Television Academy publishes the award-winning emmy magazine and through the Academy of Television Arts & Sciences Foundation, is responsible for the Archive of American Television, annual College Television Awards, Fred Rogers Memorial Scholarship, acclaimed student internships and other educational outreach programs.

== Current governance ==
- Frank Scherma (Chairman and CEO)
- Sharon Lieblein, CSA (Vice Chair)
- Rickey Minor (Second Vice Chair)
- Ann Leslie Uzdavinis (Treasurer)
- Allison Binder (Secretary)
- Casey Bloys (Chair's Appointee)
- George Cheeks (Chair's Appointee)
- Pearlena Igbokwe (Chair's Appointee)
- Gloria Calderón Kellett (Chair's Appointee)
- Lisa Nishimura (Chair's Appointee)
- Zack Van Amburg (Chair's Appointee)
- Eddie Bonin (Governors' Appointee)
- Debra Curtis (Governors' Appointee)
- Jill Dickerson (Governors' Appointee)
- Troy Underwood (Governors' Appointee)
- Cris Abrego (Chair, Television Academy Foundation)

=== Board of Governors ===
Animation
Kaz Aizawa
Lamb Chamberlin

Art Directors/Set Decorators
Kimberly Wannop, SDSA
James Yarnell

Casting Directors
Marc Hirschfeld, CSA
Kim Taylor-Coleman, CSA

Children's Programming
Gloria Poncé
Troy Underwood

Choreography
Tessandra Chavez
Dominique Kelley

Cinematographers
Patrick Cady, ASC
George Mooradian, ASC

Commercials
Yvette Cobarrubias
Charlie McBrearty

Costume Design & Supervision
Laura Guzik
Luke Reichle

Daytime Programming
Eva Basler
Brenda Brkusic Milinkovic

Directors
Anya Adams
Mary Lou Belli

Documentary Programming
Megan Chao
Senain Kheshgi

Emerging Media Programming
Kevin Dreyfuss
Eric Shamlin

Lighting, Camera & Technical Arts
Eric Becker
David Plakos

Los Angeles Area
Stephanie Hampton
Christie Lyn Lugo Leigh

Makeup Artists/Hairstylists
Nikki Carbonetta
Vito Trotta

Motion & Title Design
Ana Criado
Steve Viola

Music
Sherri Chung
Jeff Russo

Performers
Kim Estes
Kate Linder

Picture Editors
Nena Erb, ACE
Robert Michael Malachowski Jr., ACE

Professional Representatives
Hillary Bibicoff
Bryan Leder

Producers
Tony Carey
Keith Raskin

Production Executives
David Hartle
Hollann Sobers

Public Relations
Shannon Buck
Christina Lee

Reality Programming
Jill Dickerson
Scott Freeman

Science & Technology
Wendy Aylsworth
Barry Zegel

Sound
Joe Earle, CAS
Phillip W. Palmer, CAS

Sound Editors
Bobbi Banks
Chris Reeves

Special Visual Effects
Eddie Bonin
Derek Spears

Stunts
Eddie Perez
Larry Rosenthal

Television Executives
Debra Curtis
Jo DiSante

Writers
Nicole Demerse
Lynn Renee Maxcy

== Hall of Fame ==
The Television Academy Hall of Fame was founded by a former president of the ATAS, John H. Mitchell (1921–1988), to honor individuals who have made extraordinary contributions to U.S. television. Inductions are not held every year.

== See also ==
- List of American television awards
- National Academy of Television Arts and Sciences
- International Academy of Television Arts and Sciences
- Primetime Emmy Award
- Television Academy Honors Award
