= Quantum Hoops =

- Promotional release poster
- Directed by: Rick Greenwald
- Written by: Rick Greenwald
- Narrated by: David Duchovny
- Distributed by: Green Forest Films
- Release date: November 2, 2007
- Running time: 85 minutes
- Country: United States
- Language: English

Quantum Hoops is a 2007 American documentary film directed by Rick Greenwald, that follows the California Institute of Technology's basketball team—the Caltech Beavers—in their attempts to end a 21-year losing streak during the final week of the 2006 basketball season.

The documentary premiered on January 26, 2007 at the 2007 Santa Barbara International Film Festival, where it won a Top 10 Audience Choice Award. It first screened in theatres on November 2, 2007, in Pasadena, California, and featured at the 30th Denver Film Festival on November 8.

== Background ==
As a college in NCAA Division III, the California Institute of Technology (Caltech) does not award athletic scholarships. While known for its high quality of faculty and research, it is small by comparison with other colleges, with just 2,200 total students and fewer than 900 undergraduates (the NCAA generally restricts athletic eligibility to undergraduates). The school has a modest annual athletic budget of $1.1 million. It is therefore at a concerted disadvantage in college sports, being more academically minded than most colleges. Peter Roby, director of Northeastern University's Center for the Study of Sport in Society, said "It is a tribute to their unwillingness to compromise their [academic] standards that they have endured for as long as they have". The basketball team was a product of what one writer described as "perhaps the worst college basketball program ever."

The Caltech men's basketball team, the Beavers, compete in the NCAA Division III and the Southern California Intercollegiate Athletic Conference. Since their previous victory in 1985, the Beavers had not won a conference game in 21 years—a 259-game losing streak (the streak ended at 310 games when the team won a conference game against Occidental on February 22, 2011). The team had not won an NCAA Division III game for 11 years, and had not won any game—league or non-league—for 60 games.

== Summary ==
Quantum Hoops has the tagline "Before they change the world, they need to win ONE game". None of the 5 seniors on the team had any high school basketball experience. However, in 2006 their margins of defeat have been narrowing (from an average of 60 points per game to an average of 29 points per game), and the team hopes the improvements they have made will climax in the shattering of their losing streak with the victory of the season's final conference game. Featuring numerous interviews with ex-players, now mainly scientists and "computer geeks", the movie discusses the history of Caltech sports and attempts to identify the reasons behind the team's poor record. The final 20 minutes of the movie cover their attempt to win against Whittier College. On January 6, 2007, the Beavers broke their losing streak in NCAA Division III play: coached by Roy Dow, they beat Bard College 81–52 to achieve their first victory since 1996. The Caltech Beavers broke their 26-year losing streak in conference play: coached by Dr. Oliver Eslinger, by defeating Occidental College 46–45 on February 22, 2011.

== Reception ==
In North America, critical reviews of Quantum Hoops were broadly positive. On Rottentomatoes.com, it has an 81% approval rating from listed critics. The movie was reviewed by The New York Times, which called it the "cutest thing", and a movie that "chronicl[es] the handful of ups and many, many downs in the history of a team remembered less for its athletic prowess (or even competence) than for once including the father of modern computational fluid dynamics." Time magazine called it "strangely inspiring," and Sports Illustrated—although criticising the movie for lacking a "sense of urgency"—said the movie succeeds because "it's hard not to feel for the players".

== DVD release ==
The Region 1 DVD was released on July 1, 2008. It contained two commentary tracks, one a technical commentary from director Rick Greenwald, and the second featuring Greenwald and head Caltech coach Roy Dow. A short half-hour documentary on the Caltech women's basketball team is also included.

== New film ==
Disney and Ben Stiller's production company, Red Hour Films, are developing a comedy film based on the events portrayed in Quantum Hoops. Moneyball screenwriter Stan Chervin will write the script and Greenwald will executive-produce the film.

== See also ==
- List of basketball films
