= 30 for 30 =

Sports documentary film series

- Logo for 30 for 30 Volume I films
- Genre: Sports documentary
- Created by: Bill Simmons; Connor Schell
- Directed by: various
- Original language: English
- No. of episodes: 157

Production
- Executive producer: Marsha Cooke
- Production company: ESPN Films

Original release
- Network: ESPN; ESPN2; ABC; ESPN Deportes; ESPN+
- Release: October 6, 2009 – present

Related
- Nine for IX; SEC Storied

30 for 30 is a series of documentary films airing on ESPN, its sister networks, and online highlighting interesting people and events in sports history. This includes four "volumes" of 30 episodes each, a 13-episode series under the ESPN Films Presents title in 2011–2012, and a series of 30 for 30 Shorts shown through the ESPN.com website. The series has also expanded to include Soccer Stories, which aired in advance of the 2014 FIFA World Cup, and audio podcasts.

== Background ==
The idea for the series began in 2007 from ESPN.com columnist and Grantland.com founder Bill Simmons and ESPN's Connor Schell. The title, 30 for 30, derived from the series's genesis as 30 films in celebration of ESPN's 30th anniversary in 2009, with an exploration of the biggest stories from ESPN's first 30 years on-air, through a series of 30 one-hour films by 30 filmmakers.

Volume I premiered in October 2009 and ran to December 2010, chronicling 30 stories from the "ESPN era", beginning with the network's founding in 1979. Each film in Volume I details a striking sports issue or event that occurred during those three decades, including what Simmons describes as "stories that resonated at the time [they occurred] but were eventually forgotten for whatever reason." Subsequent films, including Volume II and online-only shorts, expanded the series beyond the "ESPN era".

In September 2014, Schell said, "Even though we have been at this for five years now, there is no shortage of incredible moments from the world of sports, so that enables us to continue making 30 for 30 films we're proud of." In 2010, John Dahl, Connor Schell and Simmons served as 30 for 30's executive producers. In April 2018, it was announced that the entire archive of 30 for 30 films and shorts would be available on ESPN+, ESPN's direct-to-consumer online platform, once the service launched on April 12, 2018.

== Series overview ==
Series	Episodes	Originally released	
Series	Episodes	First released	Last released
Volume I	30	October 6, 2009	December 11, 2010
ESPN Films Presents	14	March 13, 2011	February 12, 2015
Shorts	TBA	May 15, 2012	TBA
Volume II	30	October 2, 2012	July 30, 2015
Soccer Stories	8	April 15, 2014	July 1, 2014
Volume III	30	October 13, 2015	July 2, 2019
Volume IV	33	September 10, 2019	TBA

== Reception ==
=== Critical response ===
The A.V. Club review for the eighth entry, Winning Time: Reggie Miller vs. the New York Knicks, called it "the most hotly anticipated [of the first eight]" and stated that "it more than lived up to the hype." Special praise was given to Brett Morgen's collage documentary June 17th, 1994 as a standout episode. The A.V. Club has given positive and negative reviews for different episodes in the series, with notable critical reviews of the three Volume I episodes that had involvement by the media production arms of Major League Baseball (Four Days in October), the NBA (Once Brothers) and NASCAR (Tim Richmond: To the Limit).

=== Ratings ===
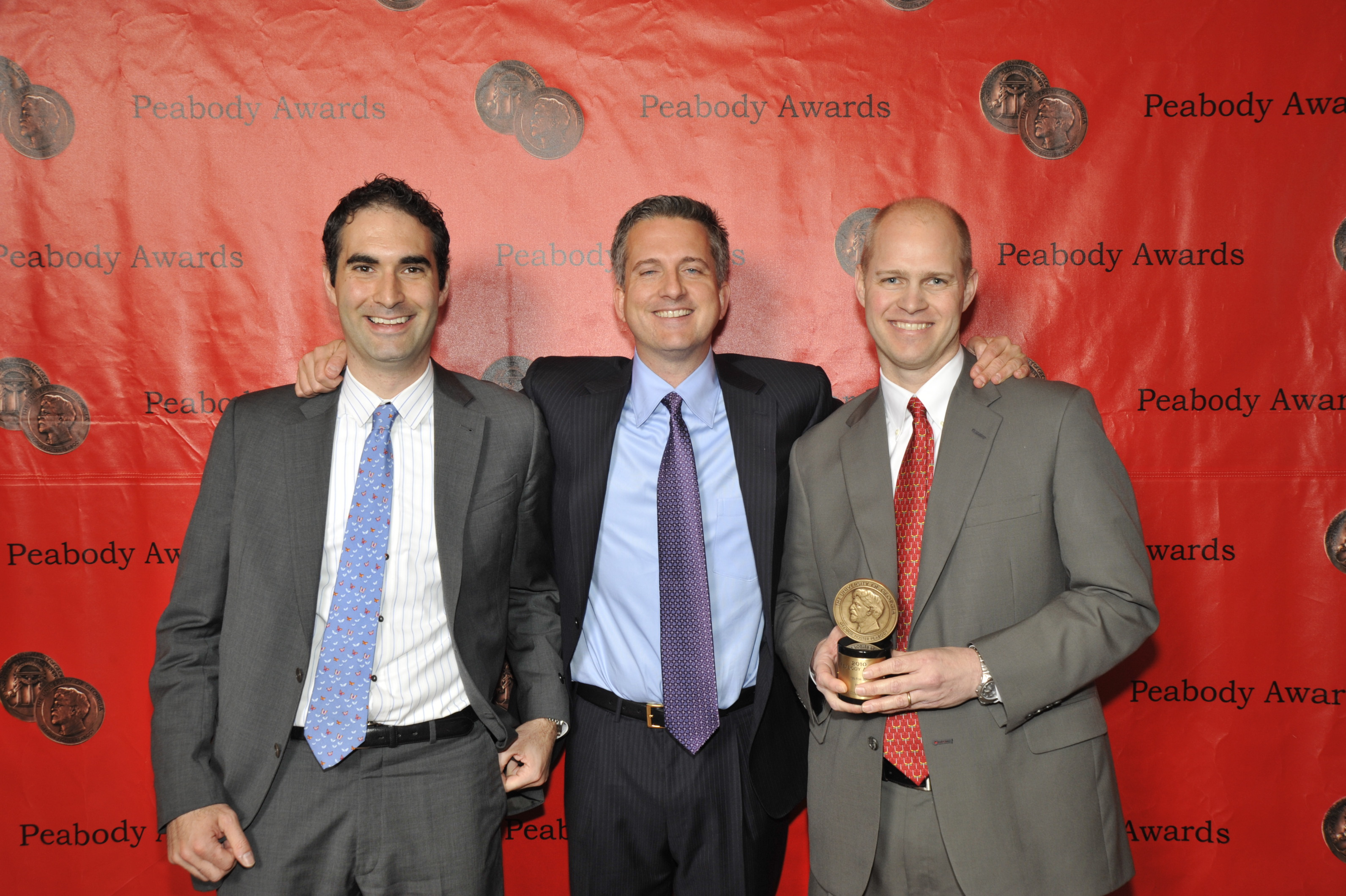
Connor Schell, Bill Simmons and John Dahl with award for 30 for 30 at the 70th Annual Peabody Awards

The series had a slow beginning. The first film, Peter Berg's Kings Ransom, a chronicle of Wayne Gretzky's trade from the Edmonton Oilers to the Los Angeles Kings, premiered on October 6, 2009, to poor ratings. Kings Ransom drew a 0.5 national rating and a total viewership of 645,000. As awareness and critical acclaim grew, the viewing audience also grew. By the seventh episode, The U, the audience had grown to a 1.8 rating and well over 2 million viewers.

=== Accolades ===
- 2010 Peabody Award Winner
- 2010 International Documentary Association's "Distinguished Continuing Series"
- 2014 Primetime Emmy Award for Outstanding Short-Format Nonfiction Program
- 2016 Academy Award for Best Documentary Feature for O.J.: Made in America
- 2016 Peabody Award for O.J.: Made in America
- 2016 Independent Spirit Award for Best Documentary Feature for O.J.: Made in America
- 2019 Adweek Podcast Awards for Publisher-Hosted Podcast of the Year
- 2022 Hollywood Critics Association TV Awards for Best Broadcast Network or Cable Docuseries or Non-Fiction Series (nomination).
- 2022, 2024, 2025, and 2026 Critics Choice Documentary Awards for Best Ongoing Documentary Series.

== Sponsors ==
Cadillac and Levi's are the presenting sponsors of the series. The Cadillac name appears on the 30 for 30 logo. The Levi's "go forth" slogan appears on the bottom corner of the screen during the directors interstitial comments, which appear for 45 seconds at the beginning of each film and 30 seconds at the end. Commercials for both companies were shown during every intermission during the original air dates, with Levi's guaranteed a 60-second commercial slot at the beginning of the third act.

Cadillac replaced Honda as a primary sponsor. During its time as a contributor, Honda aired parts of its "Dream the Impossible" documentary series in the first commercial break. During broadcasts in the UK on BT Sport, these sponsorship logos are blurred out due to compliance regulations.

== See also ==
- Nine for IX – a companion series chronicling women's sports stories
- SEC Storied – an ESPN Films series profiling the people, teams, moments and events that tell the ongoing story of the Southeastern Conference
- List of history podcasts
- List of American football films
- List of basketball films
