= Marsha Cooke =

American media executive

- Alma mater: Temple University
- Occupation: Journalist, media executive
- Employer: ESPN Films

Marsha Cooke is a journalist and television executive serving as vice president and executive producer of ESPN Films, where she also oversees the 30 for 30 documentary film unit. Her work has been recognized by the National Academy of Television Arts and Sciences (NATAS) including a 2010 Emmy Award for her work on the CBS Evening News With Katie Couric.

== Early life and education ==
Cooke is the daughter of Jamaican immigrants, and grew up in the Bronx borough in New York City. She is a 1987 graduate of Temple University, where she is also a recipient of the Lew Klein Media Award, and a 2018 inductee into Temple's Alumni Hall of Fame and Gallery of Success.

== Career ==
Cooke joined CBS News in 1993 as a news producer, and worked for 24 years with the network. She was CBS News's first Black Asia Bureau Chief.

Cooke's first position at CBS News was news producer in the Los Angeles bureau. Over the course of her CBS News career her positions included producer for CBS Evening News With Dan Rather, senior broadcast producer for CBS Evening News with Scott Pelley, and news producer in Tokyo and Beijing from 2006 to 2013. Cooke's work with CBS News earned four News & Documentary Emmy nominations, winning the 2010 award for "Outstanding Business and Economic Reporting in a Regularly Scheduled Newscast" for the "Financial Family Tree" segment. In 2016, Cooke was promoted from executive editor of content at CBSN to vice president of news services overseeing Newspath, a CBS News satellite news gathering organization.

In 2018, Cooke left CBS for the position of senior vice president of content and community strategy at VICE Media Group. In this role, she oversaw the development of special news and entertainment projects across VMG. During her time at VICE, she was also a leader of IMPACT, a branch of VMG focused on social good and responsibility initiatives. In her final year at VICE, Cooke held the position of senior vice president of global news and special projects.

In 2021, Cooke became the vice president and executive producer of ESPN Films. She has produced a variety of film and television projects at ESPN, such as Dickie V and Candace Parker: Unapologetic.
