= Amazing Grace and Chuck =

1987 American film

- Theatrical release poster
- Directed by: Mike Newell
- Written by: David Field
- Produced by: David Field
- Starring: Jamie Lee Curtis; Gregory Peck; William L. Petersen; Joshua Zuehlke; Alex English
- Cinematography: Robert Elswit
- Edited by: Peter Hollywood
- Music by: Elmer Bernstein
- Production companies: Delphi Productions; Rastar
- Distributed by: Tri-Star Pictures
- Release date: May 22, 1987 (United States)
- Running time: 114 minutes
- Country: United States
- Language: English
- Budget: $5.4 million

Amazing Grace and Chuck is a 1987 American drama film directed by Mike Newell and starring William Petersen, Jamie Lee Curtis, and Gregory Peck. It was released on VHS in the UK as Silent Voice.

The film's release came in a critical historical context, amid the deterioration of United States-Soviet Union relations, escalation of hostile political rhetoric and deepening public concern about the nuclear threat in the 1980s. The film was released one month before Soviet General Secretary Mikhail Gorbachev announced the perestroika reforms.

== Plot ==
Chuck Murdock, a 12-year-old boy from Montana and the son of a military jet pilot, becomes anxious after seeing a Minuteman missile on a school field trip, which is intensified by a nightmare of a fork dropping after being told that the speed and effectiveness would be done "before a dropped fork hits the floor". Chuck protests the existence of nuclear weapons by refusing to play baseball, which results in the forfeit of a Little League game by his team.

"Amazing Grace" Smith, a fictional Boston Celtics player, catches a blurb about the story in his newspaper and decides to emulate Chuck, saying he will no longer participate in professional basketball unless there are no more nuclear weapons. This gives it nationwide coverage, inspiring more pro athletes from across the globe to join the protest against nuclear weapons. Smith then moves to Montana to meet with Chuck and buys an old barn, which he and the other athletes renovate into their residence. Smith's agent, Lynn is unsure about what he hopes to accomplish but decides to support him and Chuck.

Chuck and Smith face pressure (including physical harm and economic threats) to quit the protests. Eventually the President of the United States personally meets with Chuck, admiring his resolve but at the same time explaining the practical difficulties. Chuck is not swayed and continues his protest. Corrupt businessman Alexander Jeffries fears the movement will destroy his influence in politics and threatens Lynn and Smith. While on flight to San Francisco, Smiths plane is blown up. His death gains wide media attention and Chuck gives a speech in admiration for Smith. In response to the media, he begins a vow of silence which is taken up by children across the world. The vow of silence disturbs national leaders and pressure mounts against the President.

Meanwhile, Lynn and the pro athletes realize Smiths plane was owned by Jeffries, who previously threatened him. In retaliation, they display his name on Goodyear Blimps which attracts attention. The FBI also trace the plane to Jeffries, but cannot provide conclusive evidence he had the plane bombed. The President calls Jeffries and demands all his business practices and ownerships ceased and that he will be under surveillance the rest of his life. The President meets with the leader of the Soviet Union and reach a decision to dismantle their nuclear arsenals as quickly as possible.

Pro athletes return to work, children begin speaking and Chuck returns to Little League. The season opener is attended by his family and the athletes, the press, the President and the Soviet Leader. Before the first pitch they hold a salute for Amazing Grace.

== Cast ==
- Joshua Zuehlke as Chuck Murdock
- Jamie Lee Curtis as Lynn Taylor
- Gregory Peck as President
- William L. Petersen as Russell
- Lee Richardson as Jeffries
- Alex English as Amazing Grace Smith

In addition, Frances Conroy appears as Pamela, Alan Autry and Michael Bowen play Miami Dolphin team mates George and Hot Dog, respectively, while Red Auerbach has a cameo as himself.

== Reception ==
On the review aggregator website Rotten Tomatoes, 43% of 7 critics' reviews are positive, with an average rating of 4.4/10.

== See also ==
- List of anti-war films
- List of baseball films
- List of basketball films
- Lysistrata
