= Nine for IX =

- Genre: Sports documentary
- Directed by: various
- Original language: English
- No. of episodes: 9 Shorts: 7

Production
- Producers: Robin Roberts; Jane Rosenthal

Original release
- Network: ESPN
- Release: July 2 – August 27, 2013

Related
- 30 for 30

Nine for IX is the title for a series of documentary films which aired on ESPN. The documentaries were produced by ESPN Films in conjunction with espnW, and were intended to have the same creative, story-driven aspect as ESPN Films' other series, 30 for 30, with the series focusing on captivating stories of women in sports told through the lens of female filmmakers. The series' name is inspired by Title IX, federal civil rights legislation passed in 1972 that prohibited discrimination on the basis of sex in educational institutions receiving federal aid; Title IX has also been regarded as helping to expand women's and girls' access to athletic opportunities. The first film, Venus Vs., premiered on July 2, 2013.

== List of Nine for IX films ==
The following films are all 60 minutes in length (including commercials).

| No. | Title | Directed by | Original release date | US viewers (millions) |
|---|---|---|---|---|
| 1 | Venus Vs. | Ava DuVernay | July 2, 2013 | 0.460 |
A look at a significant victory Venus Williams earned off the tennis court: the fight to have women competitors earn the same winnings as men at the French Open and Wimbledon.
| 2 | Pat XO | Lisa Lax and Nancy Stern Winter | July 9, 2013 | 0.311 |
An in-depth look at the legendary career of Pat Summitt, University of Tennessee Lady Vols basketball coach, and her new battle against early-onset Alzheimer's.
| 3 | Let Them Wear Towels | Ricki Stern and Annie Sundberg | July 16, 2013 | 0.197 |
The efforts of Melissa Ludtke, Lisa Olson, and other pioneering female sports journalists to gain equal access with their male brethren to the intimidating sanctum of the all-male sports locker room.
| 4 | No Limits | Alison Ellwood | July 23, 2013 | 0.400 |
An exploration of the life of world-class freediver Audrey Mestre and the events leading up to the dive that ultimately took her life.
| 5 | Swoopes | Hannah Storm | July 30, 2013 | 0.397 |
The life of Sheryl Swoopes, whose basketball accomplishments led her to be labeled as "the female Michael Jordan," but who also defied labels in terms of athletic longevity (playing into her 40s) and sexuality (one of the first high-profile athletes to come out of the closet).
| 6 | The Diplomat | Jennifer Arnold and Senain Kheshgi | August 6, 2013 | 0.437 |
Katarina Witt was one of East Germany's most successful athletes, enduring constant surveillance by the Stasi, but also faced great changes after the fall of the Berlin Wall.
| 7 | Runner | Shola Lynch | August 13, 2013 | 0.548 |
How Mary Decker became one of the greatest distance runners of the 1970s and 80s, and how a crushing experience at the 1984 Olympics defined her career.
| 8 | The '99ers | Erin Leyden | August 20, 2013 | 0.491 |
Intimate behind-the-scenes footage (shot by the players themselves) details the story of the United States women's national soccer team, whose championship performance at the 1999 World Cup served as the inspiring touchstone for women's soccer and women's athletics as a whole.
| 9 | Branded | Heidi Ewing and Rachel Grady | August 27, 2013 | 0.633 |
How some women athletes, in particular tennis player Anna Kournikova, feel the need to emphasize sex-appeal attractiveness in an effort to advance their standing in the sports and marketing worlds.

=== Short films ===
After the first short aired with the full-length films, six additional short films were created, to begin airing in June 2014. The third, fourth, fifth, and sixth shorts debuted at the 2014 Los Angeles Film Festival on June 17, before airing with the additional shorts on espnW.com. Additionally, all Nine for IX Shorts aired back-to-back on August 2, 2014, on ESPN.

| No. | Title | Directed by | Original release date | Length (mins) |
|---|---|---|---|---|
| 1 | Coach | Bess Kargman | June 18, 2013 | 17:00 |
A look at Rutgers women's basketball coach C. Vivian Stringer, and how she handled on-court pressure and off-court adversity after racial slurs were directed at her players.
| 2 | Love & Payne | Hannah Storm | June 4, 2014 | 12:30 |
Tracey Stewart offers an intimate, personal, and poignant glimpse of her relationship with her late husband, golfer Payne Stewart.
| 3 | Rowdy Ronda Rousey | Nadine Mundo and Rena Mundo Croshere | July 28, 2014 | 14:00 |
A look at the life of Ronda Rousey, and how her victory in a 2013 UFC title fight helped her pave the way for women in mixed martial arts.
| 4 | Think Normal | Nikki Reed | July 29, 2014 | 16:30 |
How Debbie McElwain gave her autistic son, Jason, the coaching, strength, and inspiration that led him to a 20-points-in-4-minutes performance in a high school basketball game.
| 5 | Brittney Griner: Lifesize | Melissa Johnson | July 30, 2014 | 16:00 |
How Brittney Griner went from celebrated kid to self-reliant adult in her basketball career.
| 6 | Uncharted Waters | Tina Carbone | July 31, 2014 | 16:15 |
The story of America³, which in 1995 raced with an initially all-female crew, the first such team in the history of the America's Cup yachting competition.
| 7 | Play A Round With Me | Jessica Wolfson | August 1, 2014 | 11:15 |
How Jan Stephenson used sex appeal and charisma to become a star in women's golf, yet tried to prove she was more than just a pretty face.
