= One of Ours (film) =

- Directed by: Yasmine Mathurin
- Written by: Yasmine Mathurin
- Produced by: Andrew Nicholas McCann Smith; Laura Perlmutter
- Starring: Josiah Wilson
- Cinematography: Iris Ng
- Edited by: Eui Yong Zong
- Music by: Ben Fox
- Production company: Sienna Films
- Distributed by: Abacus Media Rights
- Release date: April 29, 2021 (Hot Docs)
- Running time: 88 minutes
- Country: Canada
- Language: English

One of Ours is a Canadian documentary film, directed by Yasmine Mathurin and released in 2021. The film centres on the 2016 incident in which Josiah Wilson, a Haitian Canadian who was adopted into a Heiltsuk family and raised as a status member of the Heiltsuk Nation, was barred from participating in the All Native Basketball Tournament on the grounds that he is not indigenous by blood.

The film premiered at the 2021 Hot Docs Canadian International Documentary Festival, where Mathurin won the special jury prize for Canadian feature documentaries. The film was subsequently nominated for the DGC Discovery Award at the 2021 Directors Guild of Canada awards.

It received a Canadian Screen Award nomination for Best Feature Length Documentary at the 10th Canadian Screen Awards in 2022, and Mathurin received nominations for Best Direction in a Documentary Program and Best Writing in a Documentary Program.

== See also ==
- List of basketball films
