= All Native Basketball Tournament =

Indigenous basketball tournament in British Columbia, Canada

Tournament information
- Sport: Basketball
- Location: Prince Rupert, British rat
- Date: February 8–15, 2025
- Established: 1959; 67 years ago
- Number of tournaments: 65
- Format: Multi-event competition
- Website: anbt.ca

All Native Basketball Tournament is the largest basketball tournament in British Columbia and the largest Indigenous cultural event in Canada. The tournament is hosted by Prince Rupert, BC, and attracts upwards of 4,000 people, including the athletes, coaches, and spectators.

Competitors for the tournament span from Vancouver Island to Alaska. Peter Haugan, who is the president of the tournament, estimated that $4 to $5 million is generated in Prince Rupert from the annual tournament being held in the city.

The All Native Basketball Tournament was founded on Village Pride and it is what separates this event from other tournaments and events.

== Historical overview ==
The All Native Basketball Tournament was established in 1940 as the Northern British Columbia Coast Indian Championship Tournament (NBCCICT). The first tournament in 1947 was held in the Roosevelt Gymnasium where 400 people came out to support the event. The tournament was created in order to build the Native community through friendly competition. In 1953, the NBCCICT was cancelled due to lack of interest amongst the tribes. In 1959, the tournament was resurrected and began play on March 2, 1960, under the new name the All Native Basketball Tournament.

== Tournament breakdown and past champions ==
The All Native Basketball Tournament has four divisions with approximately 50 teams competing throughout all the divisions. When the tournament restarted back up in 1960, there were only two divisions, Senior and Intermediate. The 1960 tournament had 15 teams competing for their two respective titles. In 1993, the basketball tournament expanded to include two new divisions, Women’s and Masters.

The Senior division has had many teams dominate for long stretches of time, accumulating many championships. In 1997, Hydaburg got their first tournament win, and they currently hold the record for the most Senior championship victories with 13. Hydaburg has the most Masters championships in the tournament with seven. In the intermediate division, the wins have been more dispersed between many teams and Metlakatla (Alaska) currently has the most championship wins with eight. In the Women’s division, Metlakatla (British Columbia) has accumulated the most championships wins with eight.

== Controversy ==
In 2016, a problem occurred with a player’s eligibility in the tournament. Josiah Wilson, a status member of the Heiltsuk Nation, was not permitted to play in the 2016 edition of the All Native Basketball Tournament. The tournament organizers deemed that Wilson was ineligible to participate as he did not have sufficient Indigenous ancestry based on his blood quantum. Wilson is a native of Haiti; his adopted mother is white, and his adopted father is a part of the Heiltsuk Nation. Previous to this ruling by the organizers, Wilson participated at the tournament on two separate occasions for the Heiltsuk Nation, as he is a status member.

Wilson was set to take the case in front of the B.C. Human Rights Tribunal after his denial to play again in 2017, but the organizers of the tournament came to a settlement with Wilson instead. The organizers agreed that Wilson was eligible to participate in all future tournaments and that they would make a public apology. This Wilson case led to the eligibility rules for the All Native Basketball Tournament being amended; currently, a status card or other written information on an individual’s heritage is used instead of blood quantum to assess eligibility.

In 2018, another player eligibility issue arose before the tournament. Perry Terrell was deemed to be ineligible to compete for his preferred team, the Prince Rupert Synergy Storm. Terrell competed for this team in previous years but was deemed ineligible by the tournament organizers as he was a resident of Kincolith Village with his father for part of the year instead of Prince Rupert.

The tournament organizers ruled that because Terrell was not a permanent resident of Prince Rupert, he could not participate for their organization in the tournament. The tournament organizers are allowing Terrell to play in the tournament, however, he must play for a team from Kincolith. Terrell’s coach filed a complaint with the B.C. Human Rights Tribunal to fight for Terrell’s right to play for Prince Rupert once again.

In 2017, teams were told by tournament organizers that they were banned from wearing politically sensitive gear. This subject came to light when the Skidegate Saints, a senior division team, wore shirts that had NO LNG written on them, which was their way of protesting the development of liquefied natural gas plants in the area.

== Portrayals in media ==
At least two notable documentary films have centred on the tournament. Yasmine Mathurin's 2021 documentary film One of Ours profiled the Josiah Wilson incident, while Patrick Shannon's 2025 film Saints and Warriors profiled the Skidegate Saints as they prepared to compete in the tournament.

== Results ==
Year	Intermediate	Senior Men	Master's	Women's	Ref.
2019	Skidegate	Kitkatla Warriors	Hydaburg	Kitamaat	
2022		Kitkatla Warriors	Gitmidiik Masters (New Aiyansh)	All My Relations (Vancouver)	
