= The Doctor (2013 film) =

- Genre: Documentary
- Narrated by: Chuck D
- Country of origin: United States
- Original language: English

Original release
- Network: NBA TV
- Release: June 10, 2013

The Doctor is a 2013 film documenting the life of former American Basketball Association (ABA) and National Basketball Association (NBA) player and Hall of Fame inductee Julius Erving. It premiered on NBA TV on June 10, 2013.

== See also ==
- List of basketball films
