= SEC Storied =

- Genre: Sports documentary
- Directed by: various
- Original language: English
- No. of episodes: 42

Production
- Producer: ESPN Films

Original release
- Network: SEC Network
- Release: September 7, 2011 – present

Related
- 30 for 30

SEC Storied is a sports-documentary franchise, from the creators of the ESPN series 30 for 30, focusing on the people, teams, moments and events that tell the ongoing story of the Southeastern Conference.

== Background ==
SEC Storied, from the creators of 30 for 30, debuted in September 2011, allowing viewers to see stories relating to the Southeastern Conference throughout its history. From recent moments to the past, legendary coaches and athletes are highlighted, as well as the greatest moments in SEC history. One of the most watched documentaries in ESPN history is SEC Storied film, The Book of Manning, profiling the Manning family.

In 2015, SEC Storied film It’s Time: The Story of Brad Gaines and Chucky Mullins received two Sports Emmy nominations for Outstanding Sports Documentary and Outstanding Music Composition/Direction/Lyrics, the first two Sports Emmy nominations for SEC Storied.

== List of SEC Storied films ==
Unless otherwise noted, the following films are all approximately 50 minutes in length (not including commercials).

No.	Title	Directed by	Original release date
1	Herschel	Rory Karpf	September 16, 2011
A profile of former Georgia running back Herschel Walker, the 1982 Heisman Trophy winner who overcame teenage bouts with bullying for being overweight and having a severe stutter.
2	The Play That Changed College Football	Jeff Cvitkovic	December 4, 2011
A look at the inaugural SEC Football Championship Game in 1992 between Florida and Alabama, and how one play changed the game's outcome and helped shape college football's future.
3	40 Minutes Of Hell	Kenan K. Holley	February 14, 2012
The rise, fall and re-birth of Nolan Richardson, whose intense style of coaching the Arkansas men's basketball team brought a national championship to the school but also led to increased scrutiny.
4	Lolo	Rory Karpf	May 21, 2012
How Lolo Jones overcame many hurdles in life and on the track to find success at LSU's track team and the Olympics.
5	Croom	Johnson McKelvy	September 25, 2012
The story of Sylvester Croom, who both played and coached under Bear Bryant at Alabama and was one of the school's first Black football players (and the first at his position, center), then broke another barrier when he joined Mississippi State and became the first African-American head football coach in the SEC. Narrated by Terrence Howard.
6	Going Big	Jon Fish, Tom Friend	December 20, 2012
Sam Bowie had a productive basketball career at Kentucky and in the NBA but was plagued by leg injuries and lofty expectations (he was drafted one spot ahead of Michael Jordan). Still, he never let his run of bad fortune deflate his spirit, eventually finding success and happiness as a horse owner in Lexington, Kentucky.
7	The Color Orange: The Condredge Holloway Story	Kenny Chesney, Shaun Silva	January 13, 2013
Chesney tells the inspirational story of his childhood idol, Condredge Holloway, who became the first African-American quarterback at an SEC school, at Tennessee, and after a successful CFL career still bleeds Volunteer orange.
8	Miracle 3	Rory Karpf	March 3, 2013
Alabama's Mykal Riley hits a desperate 3-pointer to send a 2008 SEC men's basketball tournament quarterfinal game into overtime. Had he missed it, thousands of fans departing the Georgia Dome would have been exposed to a major tornado that swept through downtown Atlanta. Instead, Riley's "Miracle Three" prevented a major tragedy, united rivals, revealed heroes, and allowed one underdog (Georgia) to claim the conference's automatic NCAA tournament bid.
9	Abby Head On	Gentry Kirby	May 16, 2013
How Abby Wambach persevered through successes (championships at Florida and the WUSA, two Olympic soccer golds), setbacks (the WUSA's collapse, World Cup disappointments, a career-threatening injury), and a changing of the guard on the U.S. team to make her mark as one of the best soccer players America has ever produced.
10	The Book of Manning	Rory Karpf	September 24, 2013
A profile of football's Manning family — patriarch and Mississippi star Archie; his oldest son, Cooper; and younger sons, All-SEC stars, and NFL champion QBs Peyton and Eli — and how a tragedy shaped the course of not only Archie's life but his family's as well. (approx. 75 min long)
11	Sarah & Suzanne	Joie Jacoby	April 30, 2014
When Alabama's Sarah Patterson and Georgia's Suzanne Yoculan arrived on their respective campuses, both schools' women's gymnastics programs had little success and were on the verge of folding. But the two coaches would become mavericks and pioneers, turning the Crimson Tide and the Gym Dogs into championship programs (21 SEC and 14 NCAA titles combined) with passionate followings.
12	The Stars Are Aligned	Andy Billman	July 15, 2014
Fourteen famous figures — each representing a different college in the Southeastern Conference — spill their emotions and explain why they'll never forget where they came from. Featuring James Carville, Charlie Daniels, Melissa Joan Hart, Ashley Judd, Ralphie May, Jonathan Papelbon, Rick Perry, Amy Robach, Darius Rucker, Emmitt Smith, and Shepard Smith.
13	Bo, Barkley, and The Big Hurt	Larry Weitzman	July 24, 2014
The real story of three future Hall of Famers who turned the orange and blue of Auburn Tiger athletics into gold — multi-sports legend Bo Jackson (who considered bitter in-state rival Alabama while in high school), wisecracking basketball heavyweight Charles Barkley (who came close to transferring to the Crimson Tide), and Frank Thomas (who cast his lot with Auburn's football team after not being drafted by Major League Baseball) — as told through an unforgettable reunion of the famed trio at the 2013 Iron Bowl.
14	The Believer	Kenny Chesney, Shaun Silva	August 15, 2014
The story of Tennessee native Steve Spurrier, who has long had the SEC in his blood and competitive genes, first as a boyhood fan of the Volunteers, a Heisman Trophy-winning quarterback at Florida, and as a coach for both the Gators and South Carolina Gamecocks. (approx. 75 min long)
15	It’s Time: The Story of Brad Gaines and Chucky Mullins	Fritz Mitchell	August 4, 2014
The lives of Ole Miss defensive back Chucky Mullins and Vanderbilt running back Brad Gaines and their fateful on-field meeting on October 28, 1989: While Gaines was uninjured after a tackle, Mullins suffered a broken neck that left him a quadriplegic. (approx. 75 min long)
16	Shaq & Dale	Hannah Storm	March 13, 2015
The on- and off-court friendship between Shaquille O'Neal and Dale Brown, which began with O'Neal asking the LSU basketball coach for exercise tips, led to O'Neal playing for three years under Brown's watch in Baton Rouge, and has continued to this day through regular correspondences from Brown. Narrated by musician and Louisiana native Tim McGraw.
17	Coach Bernie	Lisa Lax, Nancy Stern	March 21, 2015
In his second year (1990) at Kentucky, with the once-proud Wildcat team still reeling from NCAA probation and scholarship losses, Rick Pitino shakes things up and adds fresh perspective through the hiring of Bernadette Locke, only the second female assistant coach in Division I men’s basketball history. (approx. 25 min long)
18	Dominique Belongs To Us	Kenan K. Holley	March 21, 2015
Dominique Wilkins becomes the toast of Washington, North Carolina after leading the town's high school team to 56 straight victories and two state titles. But he becomes a pariah to the townsfolk when he chooses to attend the University of Georgia over local ACC schools. It leaves Wilkins distrustful of Washington, until a community of support in Georgia convinces him to make amends.
19	Thunder and Lightning	Rory Karpf	April 11, 2015
The best team never to win the College World Series? It might have been the 1985 Mississippi State Bulldogs, who produced four Major League Baseball All-Stars. Two of them, Bobby Thigpen and Jeff Brantley, became Relievers of the Year, while the other two, Will Clark and Rafael Palmeiro, formed the imposing one-two punch known as “Thunder and Lightning.” As teammates at Mississippi State, they nearly propelled the Bulldogs to a College World Series title. Thirty years later, director Rory Karpf revisits those fabled Bulldogs, tracks the complicated relationship between Clark and Palmeiro, and brings closure to men who should be remembered for what they did, and not for what they didn’t do. (approx. 75 min long)
20	Wuerffel's Way	Jim Jorden	September 1, 2015
Danny Wuerffel was on top of the world at the end of the 1996 college football season. The University of Florida quarterback had just won the Heisman Trophy and led the Gators to a national championship. But drafted by the New Orleans Saints in the spring of 1997, he struggled to attain the same kind of success in the NFL. It was in that first year as a pro that he began volunteering in New Orleans' Desire neighborhood, one of the poorest locales in the country. After Hurricane Katrina devastated his Desire Street Academy in late August 2005, Wuerffel took the lead in tracking down his students, established a new location for the school in Florida, and expanded his outreach to help several more communities in the southeastern United States. He continued his efforts while battling a life-threatening illness. Now, ten years removed from the costliest natural disaster in American history, Wuerffel returns to New Orleans to dedicate the rebuilding of the Desire Community Square and further the cause he joined two decades ago. (approx. 25 min long)
21	Miracles on the Plains	Rory Karpf	September 8, 2015
On April 23, 2013, the oaks at Toomer's Corner had to be removed. More than two years earlier, those trees at Auburn University's historic landmark had been poisoned, casting a dark shadow over the school. Meanwhile, the Auburn football team went from national champions in 2010 to the bottom of the SEC by 2012. Head coach Gene Chizik was fired and replaced by Gus Malzahn, the offensive coordinator of that national title team. Expectations were bleak entering the 2013 season, as Malzahn inherited a team coming off its worst season in 60 years. What followed was one of the biggest single-season turnarounds in college football history — a year of implausible finishes, cinematic heroics, games for the ages...and, eventually, the symbolic return of those mighty oaks.
22	The Bo You Don't Know	Brian Goodwin	September 15, 2015
Robert "Bo" Rein's football pedigree included playing under Woody Hayes; coaching under Lou Holtz and Frank Broyles; and bringing innovation, youthful exuberance, and an ACC title to NC State before LSU hired him after the 1979 season. But Rein met an untimely death in a plane crash before ever coaching the Tigers, a tragedy that devastated his family and friends and left so many wondering, "What might have been?" (approx. 25 min long)
23	Tigers United	Marquis Daisy	September 22, 2015
A look at the brotherly bond between Missouri Tigers football teammates Michael Sam (defensive end), L'Damian Washington (wide receiver), and Marvin Foster (defensive tackle) — a bond that helped Sam gain acceptance as a gay male, brought the Tigers together as a team in 2013, and fueled their 12-2 SEC East Championship season.
24	In Search of Derrick Thomas	Joe Lavine	September 29, 2015
Life was never easy for Derrick Thomas. At the age of 5, his father, an Air Force pilot, was lost in Vietnam during a flying mission. As an adolescent growing up in a rough Miami neighborhood, Thomas ran afoul of the law and found himself in front of a judge who would give him a second chance. He turned his life around, became a star on the gridiron and attracted the attention of the University of Alabama, where he established himself as arguably the greatest pass rusher in college football history. He went on to an outstanding career as a linebacker with the Kansas City Chiefs, and in 1993, he was named the NFL's Man of the Year for his charitable contributions to the community. But at the age of 33, he was paralyzed in a car accident and died shortly thereafter, leaving behind a towering legacy that would put him in both the College and Pro Football Halls of Fame. He also had a son he never knew, Matt Naylor, who narrates this moving testament of discovery.
25	Norm	Fritz Mitchell	May 1, 2016
Profiling former Missouri Tigers basketball coach Norm Stewart. Stewart's days playing for Missouri through his time as a coach and his battle with cancer are discussed in this epic story.
26	Mighty Ruthie	Liza Lax, Nancy Stern Winters	May 22, 2016
Olympic gold medalist Ruthie Bolton, former Auburn Tigers basketball player and a victim of domestic violence, is profiled. She has become an activist for women across the world.
27	The Walk Off	Kenan K. Holley	May 22, 2016
The film looks at Warren Morris’ walk-off home run to win the 1996 College World Series for the LSU Tigers. Morris is the only man to ever hit a walk-off homer to end the College World Series.
28	Repeat After Us	Jonathan Hock	September 12, 2016
The 2006 & 2007 Florida Gators men's basketball teams are profiled, who won back-to-back National Championships, led by Joakim Noah, Al Horford, Corey Brewer, Taurean Green, Lee Humphrey, and head coach Billy Donovan.
29	Before They Were Cowboys	Corey Frost	December 28, 2016
Before Jerry Jones and Jimmy Johnson teamed up as owner and head coach of the Dallas Cowboys, they were key players on Arkansas' unbeaten national champions in 1964. The film explores how their time at Arkansas shaped their futures. Narrated by Trace Adkins.
30	The Rebel	Paul Carruthers	May 30, 2017
In 1971, Johnny Neumann was the toast of college basketball, averaging 40 points a game for Ole Miss, but failed to live up to his potential. The film examines Neumann's life and career, including how he returned to Ole Miss in 2013 to work on the college degree he once disdained.
31	King George	James Weiner	September 5, 2017
A look back at the career of South Carolina's only Heisman Trophy winner, George Rogers.
32	Courage Matters – The C. M. Newton Story	Jonathan Hock	September 26, 2017
Examines the life and career of C. M. Newton, called by the SEC "one of the towering figures in Southeastern Conference history". Just a few of his accomplishments are integrating Alabama sports, becoming the first coach to start five African Americans in an SEC men's basketball lineup, hiring the first African American head coaches in both men's and women's basketball at his alma mater of Kentucky, and contributing to the addition of the shot clock and three-pointer in NCAA men's basketball.
33	Maravich	Fritz Mitchell	March 12, 2018
The story of basketball legend Pete Maravich, focusing especially on his relationship with the father who taught him the game, coached him through his record-setting career at LSU, and experienced a religious awakening through Pete's journey into born-again Christianity.
34	Rowdy	Hannah Storm	July 16, 2018
A profile of Rowdy Gaines' career in and out of the pool, including overcoming the adversity of the 1980 Olympic boycott and his battle with Guillain–Barré syndrome.
35	Stacy's Gift	Kenan Holley	August 26, 2018
At age 11, promising Houston golfer Stacy Lewis was diagnosed with scoliosis, and spent seven years in a back brace, taking it off only to play golf. Then, she faced surgery that would likely end her career—after earning a scholarship to Arkansas. While the school honored the scholarship, she arrived in Fayetteville only able to swing a putter—but went on to become an SEC and NCAA individual champion, and still later one of the LPGA's top players. In 2017, a week after Hurricane Harvey wreaked havoc on her hometown, she broke a long tournament drought—and donated her entire check for storm relief.
36	Scramblin' Fran	Jay Jackson and Ryan Kelly	September 4, 2018
The story of Fran Tarkenton, much of it told by the Georgia and NFL legend himself—from his beginnings in Athens, to his unlikely success with the Bulldogs, his storied NFL career, and his post-football life, capped off by a return visit to Athens for "G-Day" in 2018. Co-produced with NFL Films.
37	The Sweat Solution	David Beilinson and Neil Amdur	September 18, 2018
The story behind the creation of Gatorade by a University of Florida team led by physician Robert Cade, set against the backdrop of the 1965 and 1966 Gators football teams for whom it was first created. An expanded version of a film originally created for ESPN's 30 for 30 Shorts.
38	By Grantland Rice	Joe Lavine	September 25, 2018
The story of Grantland Rice, who came from origins in mid-Tennessee (born in Murfreesboro, alumnus of Vanderbilt University, sportswriter in Nashville) to become the most iconic American sports journalist of the first half of the 20th century.
39	No Kin to Me	Marc Kinderman	March 18, 2019
Mere hours after the 1981 assassination attempt on Ronald Reagan, LSU lost to Virginia in what proved to be the last third-place game in the NCAA men's basketball tournament. After the game, LSU star Rudy Macklin, asked if the news affected the team, replied, "He's no kin of mine"—a remark that would haunt him for decades, leading to a prolonged fight to restore his honor. An expanded version of a film originally created for ESPN's 30 for 30 Shorts.
40	The All-American Cuban Comet	Gaspar Gonzalez	November 27, 2020
Chronicling late-'60s Florida wide receiver Carlos Alvarez, a Cuban immigrant who assimilated into what was an anti-Cuban American culture by excelling at football.
41	Vandy Rolls	George Roy	April 12, 2021
Vanderbilt's women's bowling team goes from walk-ons to the school's first ever national champions in the mid-2000s.
42	Volunteer for Life	Shaun Silva	March 10, 2025
Looks back at Tennessee men's basketball star Chris Lofton's senior season in 2007–08 while (unknown to almost everyone at the time) undergoing treatment for testicular cancer.
43	Wishbone	Chip Rives	July 17, 2025
Examines how the wishbone offense revived the football programs of future SEC members Texas and Oklahoma, plus charter SEC member Alabama, in the 1960s and 1970s, and had a lasting impact on college football history.

== See also ==
- 30 for 30
