= Senain Kheshgi =

Pakistani-American filmmaker

Senain Kheshgi is a Pakistani-American film director, writer and producer. She is best known for her documentary films, Project Kashmir and The Diplomat.

== Early life ==
Kheshgi was born in Karachi, Pakistan. Both her parents were born in India but moved to Pakistan after the Partition of India. Her father, Aman Khan Kheshgi was the first TV game show host on the state-run Pakistan Television. He hosted the popular quiz show ZEENA BA ZEENA. Her family emigrated to New York in the late 1960s. In 1971, Senain was cast on the Children’s Television Workshop's groundbreaking show Sesame Street. She was the first South Asian American to be cast as a ‘Regular’ on American television. She was on the show from 1971 to 1977.

== Documentary film ==
Early in her career, Kheshgi worked as a co-producer of the Peabody-winning film, "The First Year", directed by Davis Guggenheim. She then went on to produce and direct her own films. Kheshgi co-directed the feature documentary Project Kashmir along with Geeta V. Patel. The film takes place in the beautiful, but embattled Kashmir. Kheshgi and Patel navigate the dangers and complexity of a country divided. Kheshgi then co-directed The Diplomat about the East German Olympic ice skater Katarina Witt with Jennifer Arnold for ESPN Films.
