= Sebastian Telfair =

American basketball player (born 1985)

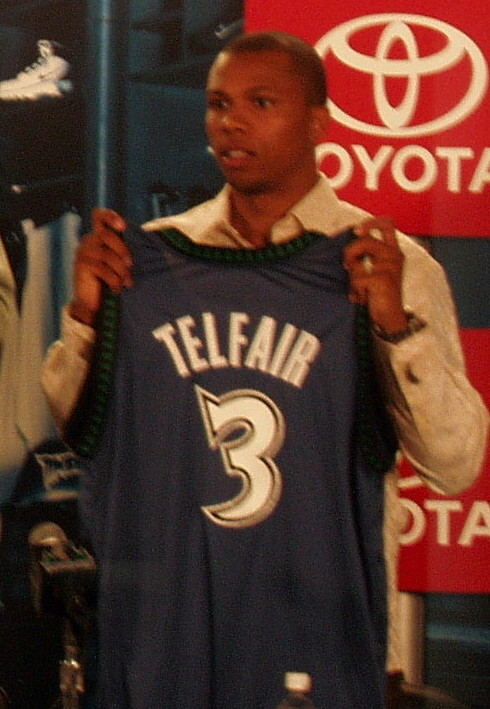
- Telfair posted with his Minnesota Timberwolves jersey during his first stint with the team in 2007

Personal information
- Born: June 9, 1985 (age 41) New York City, New York, U.S.
- Listed height: 6 ft 0 in (1.83 m)
- Listed weight: 180 lb (82 kg)

Career information
- High school: Abraham Lincoln (Brooklyn, New York)
- NBA draft: 2004: 1st round, 13th overall pick
- Drafted by: Portland Trail Blazers
- Playing career: 2004–2017
- Position: Point guard
- Number: 31, 30, 3, 13

Career history
- 2004–2006: Portland Trail Blazers
- 2006–2007: Boston Celtics
- 2007–2009: Minnesota Timberwolves
- 2009–2010: Los Angeles Clippers
- 2010: Cleveland Cavaliers
- 2010–2011: Minnesota Timberwolves
- 2011–2013: Phoenix Suns
- 2013: Toronto Raptors
- 2013–2014: Tianjin Ronggang
- 2014: Oklahoma City Thunder
- 2014–2015: Xinjiang Flying Tigers
- 2016–2017: Fujian Sturgeons

Career highlights
- Mr. Basketball USA (2004); McDonald's All-American (2004); First-team Parade All-American (2004); Second-team Parade All-American (2003); Mr. New York Basketball (2004)

Career statistics
- Points: 4,183 (7.4 ppg)
- Rebounds: 898 (1.6 rpg)
- Assists: 1,960 (3.5 apg)
- Stats at NBA.com
- Stats at Basketball Reference

Sebastian Telfair (born June 9, 1985) is an American former professional basketball player. He has played in the National Basketball Association (NBA) and the Chinese Basketball Association. Telfair was picked thirteenth overall in the 2004 NBA draft by the Portland Trail Blazers on the heels of an eminent high school career playing for Abraham Lincoln High. He had committed to the University of Louisville during his senior year, but decided to turn professional instead. Telfair is a cousin of former NBA player Stephon Marbury.

== Early years ==
Telfair was born in Brooklyn, New York, the son of Erica Telfair and Otis Telfair, a Vietnam War veteran who served as a Marine. Living in the Surfside Gardens projects in Coney Island, Brooklyn, he attended Abraham Lincoln High School, where he became one of the most highly lauded and coveted high school basketball prospects in the country.

Considered a five-star recruit by Rivals.com, Telfair was listed as the No. 2 point guard and No. 6 player in the nation in 2004. Originally, he had committed to the University of Louisville and head coach Rick Pitino. However, he later had a change of mind and went pro instead, a decision precipitated by a fatal shooting that occurred at the apartment complex where his family lived.

== Professional career ==
=== Portland Trail Blazers (2004–2006) ===
Telfair was selected by the Portland Trail Blazers with the thirteenth overall pick in the 2004 NBA draft. On January 1, 2005, Telfair scored 14 points on five-for-eleven shooting, making four of five free throws to go with five rebounds and five assists with one turnover. In February 2005, interim coach Kevin Pritchard promoted Telfair to the team's starting lineup. Telfair notched 6.8 points and 3.3 assists per contest. The Blazers ultimately lost 23 of their final 28 games that season, finishing with the team's worst record since 1973–74.

Under new head coach Nate McMillan, Telfair began the 2005–06 season as the starting point guard and was occasionally paired in the backcourt with another high school draftee taken in 2005, Martell Webster. Telfair improved upon his 2004–05 numbers; though his production was still seen by multiple commentators as being somewhat below par for an NBA starting point guard. As a result, Telfair experienced increasing pressure from various local media. In December 2005, Telfair suffered a thumb injury and was replaced in the starting lineup by Steve Blake, who went on to have fewer turnovers and more assists. Telfair returned to the court on January 9, 2006, after having missed twelve games. Blake continued as the starting point guard with Telfair coming off the bench. Although the Trail Blazers had already been eliminated from playoff contention that season, Telfair scored the game-winning basket against the Houston Rockets on April 5, 2006.

=== Boston Celtics (2006–2007) ===
On June 28, 2006, the Trail Blazers traded Telfair, along with center Theo Ratliff and a 2008 second-round pick, to the Boston Celtics for guard Dan Dickau, center–forward Raef LaFrentz, and the 7th overall pick in the 2006 NBA draft, Randy Foye, who was traded to the Minnesota Timberwolves for the 6th overall pick, Brandon Roy. Telfair wore number 30, as his traditional number 31 was retired by the Celtics.

On April 24, 2007, Celtics managing partner Wyc Grousbeck announced that Telfair's nameplate on his Celtics locker had been removed and did not expect him back for the 2007–08 season.

=== Minnesota Timberwolves (2007–2009) ===
On July 31, 2007, the Celtics traded Telfair, along with Al Jefferson, Gerald Green, Ryan Gomes, Theo Ratliff and two first-round draft picks, to the Minnesota Timberwolves for Kevin Garnett. He was given the # 3 jersey while with Minnesota, the same number that his cousin, Stephon Marbury wore while playing for that team.

In the 2007–08 season, Telfair had his best season as a pro, averaging 9.3 points and 5.9 assists per game. Telfair also had a stretch of five games in which he had 40 assists and only four turnovers. He wore number 3 for the Timberwolves because the number 31 had been taken by shooting guard Ricky Davis.

On July 22, 2008, the Minnesota Timberwolves re-signed Telfair to a three-year contract. Because the Timberwolves fired head coach Randy Wittman and replaced him with interim coach Kevin McHale, Telfair played for his sixth coach on his third NBA team in his fifth NBA season. He played in 75 games including 43 starts.

=== Los Angeles Clippers (2009–2010) ===
On July 20, 2009, Telfair was traded to the Los Angeles Clippers along with Craig Smith and Mark Madsen in exchange for Quentin Richardson.

=== Cleveland Cavaliers (2010) ===
On February 17, 2010, Telfair was traded from the Los Angeles Clippers to the Cleveland Cavaliers as part of a three-team, six-player trade that sent Antawn Jamison from the Washington Wizards to Cleveland, Zydrunas Ilgauskas, a 2010 first-round pick (which became Lazar Hayward) and the rights to Emir Preldžić from Cleveland to Washington, Drew Gooden from Washington to Los Angeles, and Al Thornton from Los Angeles to Washington.

=== Return to Minnesota (2010–2011) ===
On July 26, 2010, Telfair was traded back to the Minnesota Timberwolves, along with Delonte West, for Ramon Sessions and Ryan Hollins.

=== Phoenix Suns (2011–2013) ===
Right after the 2011 NBA lockout ended, Telfair signed with the Phoenix Suns on December 9, 2011. His contract had him initially staying for one year, but he received a team option to play for a second season in Phoenix. Telfair started for the Suns in a 91–87 victory against the Los Angeles Clippers. Telfair would score a season high 21 points in a 105–91 loss to the San Antonio Spurs. During the month of April in the shortened season, Telfair averaged an impressive 10.9 points and 3.6 assists on a .522 shooting percentage. In other months, he had averaged 4.7 points and 1.9 assists on a .358 shooting percentage.

=== Toronto Raptors (2013) ===
On February 21, 2013, Telfair was traded to the Toronto Raptors in exchange for Hamed Haddadi and a second-round draft pick. He became a free agent in the summer of 2013.

=== Tianjin Ronggang (2013–2014) ===
In October 2013, Telfair signed a one-year deal with the Tianjin Ronggang of the Chinese Basketball Association.

=== Oklahoma City Thunder (2014) ===
On July 15, 2014, Telfair signed with the Oklahoma City Thunder. On November 26, 2014, Telfair scored five points against the Utah Jazz. He was waived by the Thunder that same day.

=== Xinjiang Flying Tigers (2014–2015) ===
On December 2, 2014, Telfair signed with the Xinjiang Flying Tigers for the rest of the 2014–15 CBA season.

=== Fuijan Sturgeons (2016–2017) ===
On November 18, 2016, Telfair signed with the Fuijan Sturgeons.

== Legal issues ==
On October 16, 2006, Telfair had a chain, valued at $50,000, snatched from his possession outside Sean "Diddy" Combs's restaurant, Justin's. As it happened, rapper Fabolous was shot outside the same club shortly afterward. The following night, Telfair left a pre-season basketball game against the New York Knicks at Madison Square Garden to observe a police lineup, but he did not identify any of the potential suspects.

Telfair and a friend, Al Eden Fuentes, were arrested early on April 20, 2007, and charged with felony possession of a weapon. The arrest was preceded by a traffic stop prompted when Telfair was spotted driving his 2006 Range Rover at 77 mph (124 km/h) on the Bronx River Parkway, a 45 mph (72 km/h) zone. Telfair was driving with a suspended Florida license. Furthermore, when police searched Telfair's vehicle, they uncovered a loaded .45 caliber handgun under the passenger's seat. Both Telfair and Eden claimed to not have any knowledge of the firearm. The police were unable to determine the registration status of the handgun.

In September 2008, Telfair pleaded guilty to criminal possession of a weapon and received three years' probation. In October 2008, the NBA handed him a three-game suspension following the guilty plea.

On June 11, 2017, Telfair and another man were arrested on weapons and marijuana-related charges during a traffic stop in Brooklyn. Police pulled them over for driving without headlights on and illegally parking. Inside the vehicle, officers spotted a lit joint, and a subsequent search yielded three loaded handguns, a semiautomatic rifle, a ballistics vest, and several bags of marijuana that were among suitcases, clothing, shoes, and furniture parts. Sebastian was in New York at the time for what was supposed to have been only a matter of hours, being in between a move of residence, and for the opening of basketball courts at the Coney Island projects where he was raised. In April 2019, following a two-week trial, Telfair was found guilty of felonious weapons possession. On August 12, 2019, he was sentenced to three and a half years in prison for the offense. His conviction was overturned by the New York Court of Appeals on November 21, 2023.

Reported by ESPN from an October 7, 2021 indictment, eighteen former NBA players, including Telfair, Jamario Moon, Glen Davis, Tony Allen and Darius Miles, were arrested on charges alleging they defrauded the league's health and welfare benefit plan out of about $4 million. According to the indictment, the former players engaged in a widespread scheme to defraud the plan by submitting false and fraudulent claims to get reimbursed for medical and dental expenses that were never actually incurred.

Telfair pleaded guilty to charges of fraud on March 16, 2023. He was sentenced to three years probation. He has been ordered to report to prison in August 2025 for six months for failure to abide by court-ordered community service and failure to report to the U.S. Probation Office.

== Biographical coverage ==
Telfair is the subject of the book, The Jump: Sebastian Telfair and the High-Stakes Business of High School Ball (ISBN 1594864470), by Ian O'Connor as well as a documentary film by Jonathan Hock, Through the Fire; the latter follows Telfair through his final year in high school and accounts his decision to choose the NBA over college. Telfair is the cousin of Stephon Marbury, a former NBA and CBA star, and the half-brother of former NBA player Jamel Thomas. Telfair is also a cousin of Dodgers outfielder Josue De Paula. Attending Lincoln High School in the Coney Island section of Brooklyn, Telfair was the school's all-time leading scorer until Lance Stephenson broke his record in 2009. Telfair was also named New York State Mr. Basketball following his outstanding senior season at Lincoln. His younger brother Ethan Telfair, who likewise featured in the documentary film, played basketball at Idaho State.

== NBA career statistics ==
Legend
GP	Games played	GS	Games started	MPG	Minutes per game
FG%	Field goal percentage	3P%	3-point field goal percentage	FT%	Free throw percentage
RPG	Rebounds per game	APG	Assists per game	SPG	Steals per game
BPG	Blocks per game	PPG	Points per game	**Bold**	Career high

=== Regular season ===
Year	Team	GP	GS	MPG	FG%	3P%	FT%	RPG	APG	SPG	BPG	PPG
2004–05	Portland	68	26	19.6	.393	.246	.789	1.5	3.3	.5	.1	6.8
2005–06	Portland	68	30	24.1	.394	.352	.743	1.8	3.6	1.0	.1	9.5
2006–07	Boston	**78**	30	20.2	.371	.289	.818	1.4	2.8	.6	.1	6.1
2007–08	Minnesota	60	**51**	**32.2**	.401	.281	.743	**2.3**	**5.9**	**1.0**	**.2**	9.3
2008–09	Minnesota	75	43	27.9	.383	.346	.819	1.7	4.6	**1.0**	**.2**	**9.8**
2009–10	L.A. Clippers	39	1	14.9	.404	.234	.774	1.1	2.9	.6	.1	4.3
2009–10	Cleveland	4	0	19.3	**.457**	.222	**.833**	1.0	3.0	.5	.0	**9.8**
2010–11	Minnesota	37	8	19.2	.402	.359	.733	1.5	3.0	.7	.1	7.2
2011–12	Phoenix	60	1	14.9	.412	.314	.791	1.5	2.3	.7	**.2**	6.1
2012–13	Phoenix	46	2	17.3	.381	**.381**	.772	1.5	2.5	.6	**.2**	6.0
2012–13	Toronto	13	0	14.2	.290	.270	**.833**	1.2	3.0	.7	.1	4.3
2014–15	Oklahoma City	16	1	20.4	.368	.300	.706	1.9	2.8	.6	.0	8.4
Career		564	193	21.5	.390	.319	.777	1.6	3.5	.7	.1	7.4
