= Yasmine Mathurin =

Haitian-Canadian filmmaker

Yasmine Mathurin is a Haitian Canadian filmmaker, most noted for her 2021 film One of Ours. The film was a Canadian Screen Award nominee for Best Feature Length Documentary, and Mathurin was nominated for Best Direction in a Documentary Program and Best Writing in a Documentary Program, at the 10th Canadian Screen Awards in 2022.

Mathurin divided her time between Haiti and Montreal in childhood, before moving to Calgary as a teenager. After studying political science at York University in Toronto, she attained a fellowship at the United Nations in 2011, but became disenchanted with the bureaucratic aspects of politics and went back to school to study journalism. She subsequently created The Conversation Project, a web series in which she engaged her friends in conversation about Black Canadian culture and identity, and participated in a talent incubator run by Toronto film studio Refuge Productions to further develop her filmmaking skills. She was a producer of Tai Asks Why, a Canadian Broadcasting Corporation podcast and summer radio series.

In 2023 she won the TIFF-CBC Films Screenwriter Award for her feature film screenplay Sorry Pardon Madame.
