= ESPN Films =

Film production company

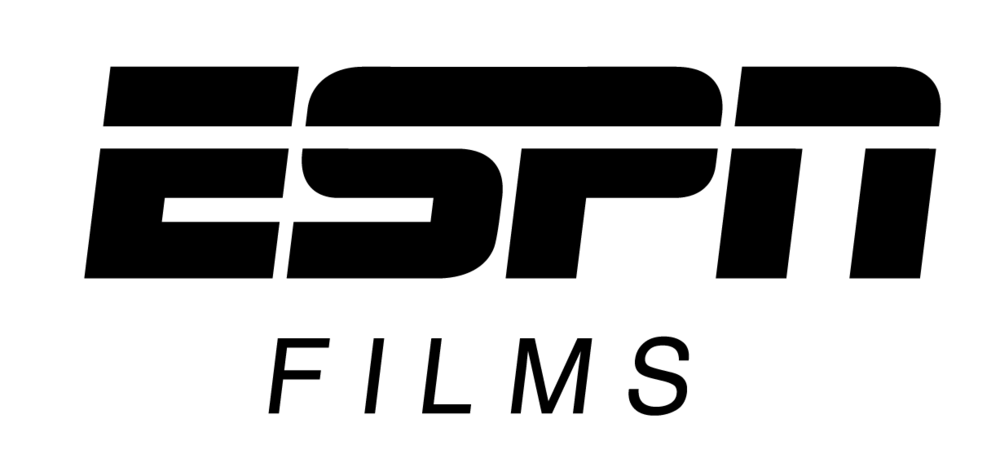
- Type: Subsidiary
- Industry: Film
- Genre: Sports television and films
- Founded: 2008; 18 years ago
- Key people: Marsha Cooke (executive producer)
- Parent: ESPN, LLC
- Website: www.espn.com/espn/espnfilms/

ESPN Films is an American production company which produces and distributes sports films and documentaries. It is owned by ESPN, LLC, a joint venture between The Walt Disney Company (which owns a controlling 72% stake via indirect subsidiary ABC Inc.), Hearst Communications (which owns 18%), and the National Football League (which owns 10%).

Walt Disney Studios Motion Pictures distributes and markets the films produced by ESPN Films in theatrical markets.

Created in March 2008, ESPN Films produces films covering sports-related stories. Projects from the subsidiary include 30 for 30 (and its offshoots 30 for 30: Soccer Stories and the digital series 30 for 30 Shorts), the critically acclaimed Nine for IX series and SEC Storied.

== History ==
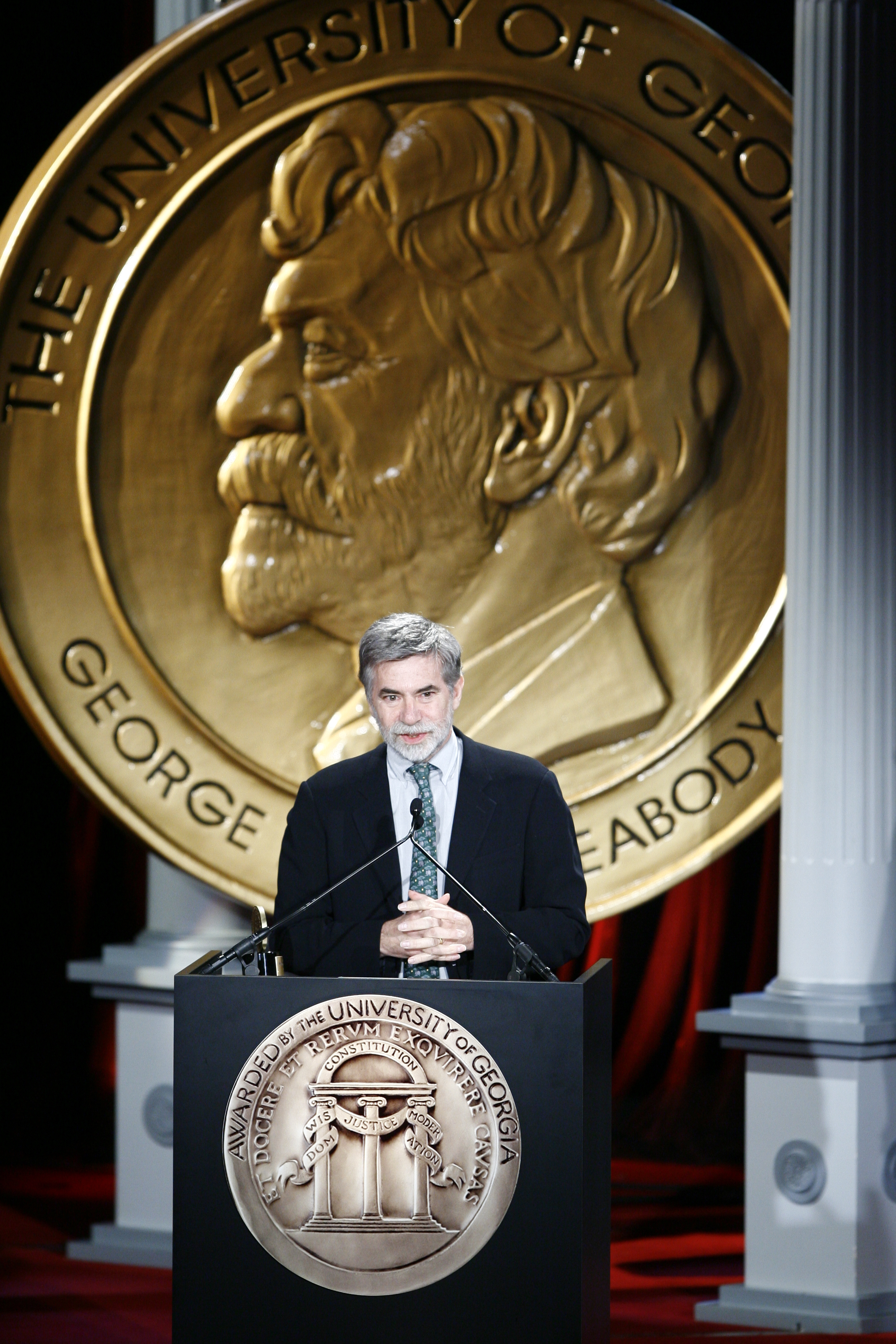
Dan Klores at the 68th Annual Peabody Awards for Black Magic

On 3 March 2008, ESPN announced that it would launch ESPN films. Under the restructuring, ESPN Films began producing projects for theatrical release in addition to television; majority corporate parent The Walt Disney Company holds the right of first refusal on all projects. In addition, ESPN announced a new alliance with the Creative Artists Agency, which among its various clients, represents athletes such as LeBron James, David Beckham and Peyton Manning.

The first production under the ESPN Films banner was Black Magic, a four-hour documentary that premiered on ESPN without commercial interruption over two consecutive nights starting on March 16, 2008. The film, which won a Peabody Award in 2009, about the history of basketball played at Historically Black Colleges and Universities. The company's first theatrical film was X Games 3D: The Movie, which was released on August 21, 2009.

On October 6, 2009, ESPN premiered 30 for 30, a 30-hour series produced by ESPN Films that debuted in commemoration of the 30th anniversary of the cable network's launch. Among those participating in the project included Spike Lee, Richard Linklater, Barry Levinson and Mike Tollin. The series, which earned Peabody and Producer's Guild Awards and was nominated for an Emmy, featured thoughtful and innovative reflections on the previous three decades in sports told through a diverse array of sports fans and social commentators. Positive reaction from both critics and viewers led to a spin-off 30 for 30: Volume II. ESPN took its first ever Academy Award when O.J.: Made in America film won in the category of Best Documentary Feature at the 2017 Oscars.

== List of ESPN Films productions ==
=== Talk shows ===
- Around the Horn (2002–2025)
- Cold Pizza (2003–2007; now known as First Take)
- ESPN Hollywood (2005–2006)
- The Fantasy Show (2006)
- Jim Rome Is Burning (2003–2012)
- Pardon the Interruption (2001–present)
- Quite Frankly with Stephen A. Smith (2005–2007)
- SportsCenter (1988–present)

=== Series ===
- Playmakers (2003)
- Tilt (2005)

=== Mini-series ===
- The Bronx is Burning (2007)
- The Captain (2022)

=== Events ===
- ESPY Awards (1993–present)
- X Games (1995–present)
- Winter X Games (1997–present)
- World Series of Poker (1988–present)

=== Reality ===
- Battle of the Gridiron Stars (2005–present)
- Bonds on Bonds (2006)
- Bound for Glory (2005)
- It's The Shoes
- Madden Nation (2005–present)
- Knight School (2006)
- Streetball
- The Contender (2006–present)
- The Life

=== Game shows ===
- Stump the Schwab (2004–2006)
- 2 Minute Drill (2000–2002)

=== Documentaries ===
- Once in a Lifetime: The Extraordinary Story of the New York Cosmos (2006)
- Through the Fire (2005)
- Kobe Doin' Work (2009)
- 30 for 30 (2009–2010, 2012–present)
- Wendell Scott: A Race Story (2011)
- ESPN Films Presents (2011–2012)
- Nine for IX (2013)
- O.J.: Made in America (2016)
- Baltimore Boys (2017)
- The Last Dance (2020)
- The Cave of Adullam (2022)
- Gracie (2025)
- Sumo: Spirit Weighs Nothing

=== Films ===
- 3: The Dale Earnhardt Story (2004)
- A Season on the Brink (2002)
- Code Breakers (2005)
- Hustle (2004)
- Ruffian (2007)
- The Junction Boys (2002)
- Four Minutes (2005)
- X Games 3D: The Movie (2009)
- Lombardi (2010 or 2011; produced in conjunction with NFL Films)
- Keepers of the Streak (2015)
- Queen of Katwe (2016; produced with Walt Disney Pictures)
- World Beaters (2017)
- 144 (2021)
- Betsy & Irv (2022; short)
