= Alex English =

American basketball player/coach (born 1954)

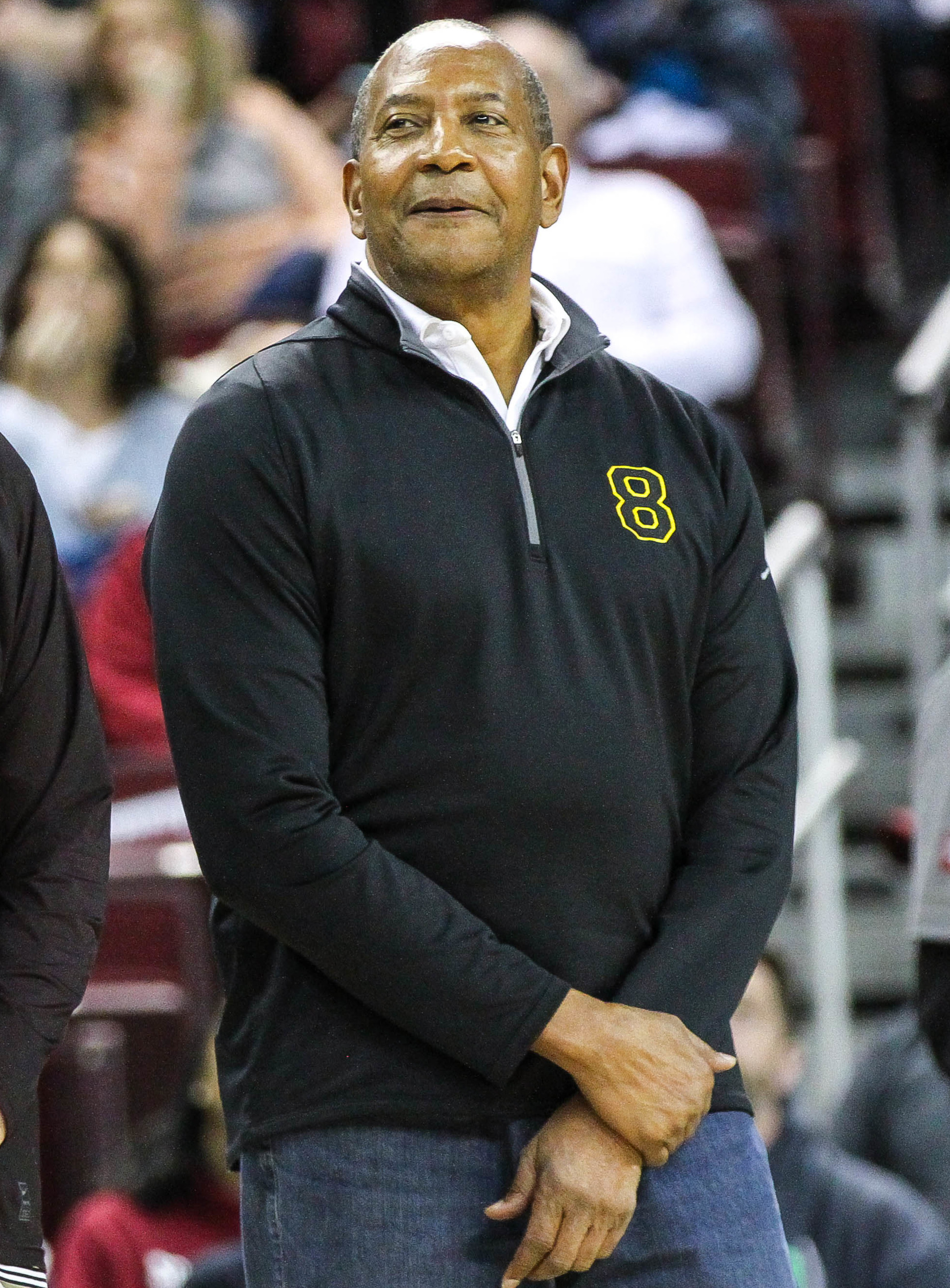
- English in 2019

Personal information
- Born: January 5, 1954 (age 72) Columbia, South Carolina, U.S.
- Listed height: 6 ft 8 in (2.03 m)
- Listed weight: 190 lb (86 kg)

Career information
- High school: Dreher (Columbia, South Carolina)
- College: South Carolina (1972–1976)
- NBA draft: 1976: 2nd round, 23rd overall pick
- Drafted by: Milwaukee Bucks
- Playing career: 1976–1992
- Position: Small forward
- Number: 23, 22, 2
- Coaching career: 2002–2013

Career history

Playing
- 1976–1978: Milwaukee Bucks
- 1978–1980: Indiana Pacers
- 1980–1990: Denver Nuggets
- 1990–1991: Dallas Mavericks
- 1991–1992: Basket Napoli

Career highlights
- 8× NBA All-Star (1982–1989); 3× All-NBA Second Team (1982, 1983, 1986); NBA scoring champion (1983); No. 2 retired by Denver Nuggets; No. 22 retired by South Carolina Gamecocks

Career NBA statistics
- Points: 25,613 (21.5 ppg)
- Rebounds: 6,538 (5.5 rpg)
- Assists: 4,351 (3.6 apg)
- Stats at NBA.com
- Stats at Basketball Reference
- Basketball Hall of Fame
- Collegiate Basketball Hall of Fame

Alexander English (born January 5, 1954), nicknamed "the Blade", is an American former professional basketball player, coach, and businessman.

A South Carolina native, English played college basketball for the South Carolina Gamecocks. He was selected in the second round of the National Basketball Association (NBA) draft in 1976. English played the small forward position and was a star player for the Denver Nuggets in the 1980s. During his Nuggets tenure (1979–1989), the team made the NBA playoffs nine consecutive times, won two Midwest Division titles, and reached the 1985 Western Conference Finals. English played 15 seasons in the NBA for four teams, averaging 21.5 points and 5.5 rebounds per game. English scored more points than any other NBA player during the 1980s. He was named to eight NBA All-Star teams and made the All-NBA Second Team three times. English led the NBA in scoring in the 1982–83 season. His number 2 jersey was retired by the Denver Nuggets in 1992, and he was elected to the Naismith Memorial Basketball Hall of Fame in 1997.

After his playing career ended, English worked for the NBA, served as an assistant coach for several NBA teams, was involved in various business ventures, dabbled in acting, and became an NBA ambassador. He currently sits on the board of trustees at his alma mater, the University of South Carolina.

== Early life ==
English was born and raised in Columbia, South Carolina. For some of his childhood, he and his siblings lived with their grandmother while their parents worked in New York. During this time, English often subsisted on a single meal per day.

English attended Dreher High School in Columbia. On January 31, 2020, his number 22 jersey was retired by the high school.

== College career ==
English attended the University of South Carolina in Columbia from 1972 to 1976. He started every game over a four-year career and was arguably the first African-American sports star at the school. He scored a record 1,972 points and was only the third player at the school to record over 1,000 rebounds and connect on better than 50% of his field-goal attempts. English was selected to two independent All-America teams in 1975 and 1976. In the academic realm, English "developed interests that he still maintains in art, sculpture, literature, and, especially poetry." He graduated with a bachelor's degree in English in 1976.

== Professional career ==
=== Milwaukee Bucks (1976–1978) ===
English was drafted by the Milwaukee Bucks in the second round of the 1976 NBA draft with the 23rd pick. Playing behind notable wings such as Bob Dandridge, Junior Bridgeman, and Brian Winters, English struggled to break into coach Don Nelson's rotation. Despite this, English showed promise during the 1978 NBA Playoffs, averaging 13.4 points per game (third highest of all Bucks players that postseason) off the bench while helping the Bucks past the Suns in the first round, before losing to the Nuggets in a seven-game western conference semifinals series.

=== Indiana Pacers (1978–1980) ===
Frustrated with a lack of playing time, English signed with the Indiana Pacers as a free agent after the 1977–78 season. English became a starter in Indiana and began to establish a reputation as a scorer, averaging 16 points per game during the 1978–79 season on another rebuilding team.

=== Denver Nuggets (1980–1990) ===
English was traded to the Denver Nuggets midway through the 1979–80 season for George McGinnis, a former Pacers star from their ABA days. Though coming off of an All-Star season in 1978–79, McGinnis was only a shadow of his former self and was out of the league by 1982. English went on to become a star player for the Nuggets.

In his first full season with the Nuggets in 1980–81, English averaged a then-career high 23.8 points.

In the 1981–82 season, English averaged 25.4 points and the team advanced to postseason play. He earned a position on the All-Star Team and All-NBA Second Team. The following year, in 1982–83, English won the league scoring title with an average of 28.4 points per game, while teammate Kiki Vandeweghe placed second averaging 26.7 points. Then in 1983–84 English placed fourth in the league in scoring.

In the 1984–85 season English raised his scoring average to 27.9 points to pick up some of the slack from Vandeweghe's departure. Denver won its division and secured the second seed in the Western Conference. In the 1985 playoffs, English averaged 30.2 points as the Nuggets defeated the San Antonio Spurs and Utah Jazz to meet the Los Angeles Lakers in the Western Conference Finals, where they would fall to the eventual NBA-champion Lakers in five games. English suffered a right thumb injury in Game 4, which required surgery and rendered him unable to play for the rest of the series. With the Nuggets already dealing with injuries to other players, English's injury was thought by some to have nearly ensured a Laker victory in the series. English later stated in a 2006 interview that "I think that if I had not broken my thumb [...] we had a chance to beat the Lakers."

English recorded his career-best average of 29.8 points per game in the subsequent 1985–86 season, finishing third in the league behind Dominique Wilkins and Adrian Dantley. In the 1986 NBA All-Star Game, English set his All-Star career-high by scoring 16 points on 8-of-12 shooting in 16 minutes off the bench for the West squad. During the 1986 NBA playoffs, English led the Nuggets past the Trail Blazers in the first round. In the Western Conference Semifinals, English averaged 29.2 points, 4 rebounds, and 4 assists in a six-game series loss to the eventual western conference champion Rockets. In the final game of the series, on May 8, 1986, English tied his own Nuggets single-game playoff points record with 42 during a 126-122 double overtime loss.

In 1988, English received the J. Walter Kennedy Citizenship Award for his community service efforts. On March 10, 1989, English scored 51 points, notably without attempting any three-point shots, and recorded nine assists during a 131–130 overtime loss to the Miami Heat.

After the 1989–90 season, in which English's scoring average dipped to 17.9 and he largely struggled to maintain his level of play compared to previous seasons, English became a free agent, and the Nuggets elected not to re-sign him.

=== Dallas Mavericks (1990–1991) ===
At age 36, English signed a one-year contract with the Dallas Mavericks where he once again played off the bench, this time averaging just under 10 points per game. He played his final NBA game in 1991 for the Mavericks.

=== Napoli (1991–1992) ===
No other NBA team signed English for the 1991–1992 season, and after a stint in Italy with Basket Napoli, English ended his playing career.

=== Legacy ===
When English left the Denver Nuggets, he was the holder of nearly every team record, including most career points (21,645), assists (3,679), games (837) and minutes (29,893) in a Nuggets uniform, along with the highest career scoring average with the team (25.9) of any player. The Nuggets retired English's number 2 jersey in 1992. As of 2019, English's career 25,613 points place him 19th on the NBA's all-time career scoring list. While in Denver, English made the NBA All-Star Team eight times and the All-NBA Second Team three times. During his Nuggets tenure, the team made the NBA playoffs nine consecutive times and won two Midwest Division titles.

English retired with NBA career averages of 21.5 points and 5.5 rebounds per game. He was the first NBA player to score 2,000 points in eight consecutive seasons, and he has the distinction of being the top NBA scorer in the 1980s. English was elected to the Naismith Memorial Basketball Hall of Fame in 1997. In 2021, to commemorate the NBA's 75th Anniversary The Athletic ranked their top 75 players of all time, and named English as the 71st greatest player in NBA history.

== Coaching career ==
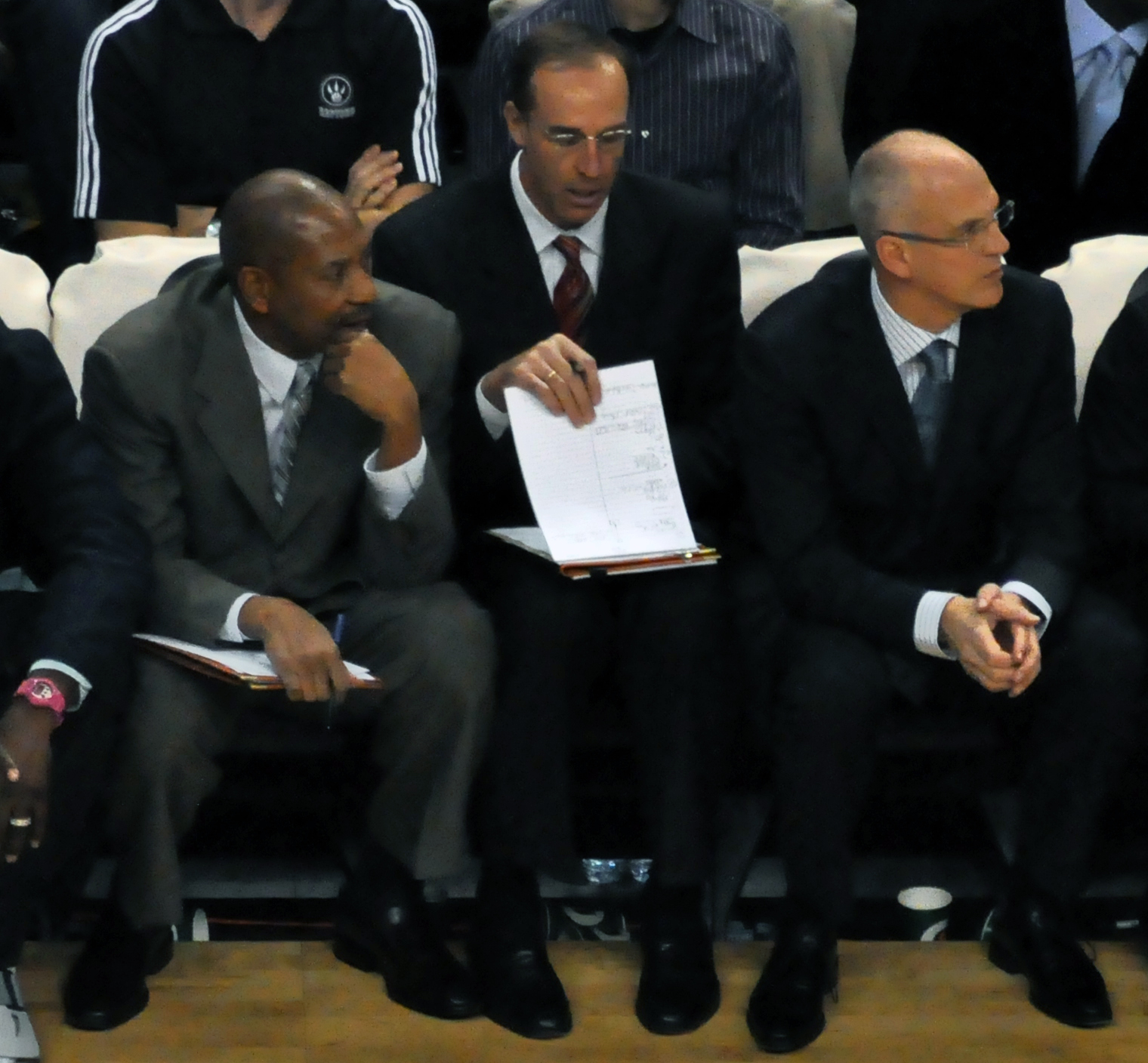
English (left) on the 2009–10 Toronto Raptors coaching staff

English began his coaching career in the National Basketball Development League (now called the NBA G League) as the head coach of the North Charleston Lowgators in the 2001–02 season; this was the first season of the league. The Lowgators tied for the best record during the regular season, but they were eliminated in the championship series in the playoffs.

Before the 2002-03 NBA season, English joined the coaching staff of the Atlanta Hawks. The following year, he was hired by the Philadelphia 76ers as an assistant coach.

English then joined the Toronto Raptors in 2004 to serve as assistant coach and director of player development. On June 5, 2009, it was announced that English would stay with the Raptors as an assistant coach. On July 13, 2011, with the team heading in a new direction after the hiring of new head coach Dwane Casey, English was not given a new contract, and his services were not retained.

On January 13, 2012, English was added to the Sacramento Kings coaching staff under head coach Keith Smart. On June 5, 2013, new Kings coach Michael Malone announced that the 2012–13 assistant coaches, including English, would not be retained for the 2013–14 season.

== Other work ==
=== Sports ===
English was the first-ever director of player programs for the National Basketball Players Association.

SEC Network announced on November 11, 2014, that English had been hired as a color analyst.

Since 2014, English has been an active participant in the Sports Diplomacy's Sports Envoy program for the U.S. Department of State. In this function, he has traveled to Italy, the Republic of Korea, and Chile, where he worked with Nykesha Sales and Candace Wiggins to conduct basketball clinics and events that reached more than 1900 youth from underserved areas. In so doing, English helped contribute to Sports Diplomacy's mission to reach out to youth populations in order to promote growth and a stable democratic government.

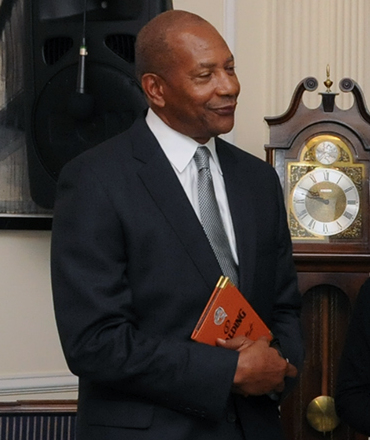
English in Montevideo in October 2014

English participates in Basketball Without Borders. He is an NBA ambassador and has taught at NBA academies in various countries.

=== Business ===
English and his wife, Vanessa, owned Wendy's franchises in South Carolina. English has also formed a company called GreenSmart Botanicals, which sells hemp-related products.

=== Acting ===
English has dabbled in acting. His acting debut came in the 1987 motion picture Amazing Grace and Chuck, playing a fictitious Boston Celtics star. He then had roles in the television series Midnight Caller in some 1989 episodes and played the head coach of the Cleveland Cavaliers in Eddie (1996). He also played a role as "The Premiere" in the 1997 film The Definite Maybe. English also appeared in a 1993 film about the hazards of drug use produced by the U.S. Department of Justice; he was presented as a good example to follow as someone who consciously avoided drug use and criminality, in contrast to co-star Ralph Coleman, a former Dallas Cowboys linebacker who was convicted of murder and sentenced to life in prison.

English later acted in a 2007 film called Lumera for which his son Alex Jr. was the producer and executive director. In 2013, he appeared on a half-hour TV special called The Nothing But Net Show, which was also directed by his son.

== Personal life ==
As of 2020, English resides in Blythewood, South Carolina .

== NBA career statistics ==
Legend
GP	Games played	GS	Games started	MPG	Minutes per game
FG%	Field goal percentage	3P%	3-point field goal percentage	FT%	Free throw percentage
RPG	Rebounds per game	APG	Assists per game	SPG	Steals per game
BPG	Blocks per game	PPG	Points per game	**Bold**	Career high
*	Led the league

=== Regular season ===
Year	Team	GP	GS	MPG	FG%	3P%	FT%	RPG	APG	SPG	BPG	PPG
1976–77	Milwaukee	60	6	10.8	.477	–	.767	2.8	.4	.3	.3	3.2
1977–78	Milwaukee	**82**	4	18.9	.542	–	.727	4.8	1.6	.5	.7	9.6
1978–79	Indiana	81	69	33.3	.511	–	.752	8.1	3.3	.9	1.0	16.0
1979–80	Indiana	54	15	28.3	.504	.000	.814	7.0	2.6	.8	.6	14.9
1979–80	Denver	24	24	36.5	.485	**.667**	.762	**9.4**	3.4	1.2	1.2	21.3
1980–81	Denver	81	81	**38.2**	.494	.600	.850	8.0	3.6	1.3	1.2	23.8
1981–82	Denver	**82**	**82**	36.8	**.551**	.000	.840	6.8	**5.3**	1.1	**1.5**	25.4
1982–83	Denver	**82**	**82**	36.4	.516	.167	.829	7.3	4.8	**1.4**	**1.5**	28.4*
1983–84	Denver	**82**	77	35.0	.529	.143	.824	5.7	5.0	1.0	1.2	26.4
1984–85	Denver	81	81	36.1	.518	.200	.829	5.7	4.2	1.2	.6	27.9
1985–86	Denver	81	81	37.3	.504	.200	.862	5.0	4.0	.9	.4	**29.8**
1986–87	Denver	**82**	**82**	37.6	.503	.267	.844	4.2	5.1	.9	.3	28.6
1987–88	Denver	80	80	35.2	.495	.000	.828	4.7	4.7	.9	.3	25.0
1988–89	Denver	**82**	**82**	36.5	.491	.250	.858	4.0	4.7	.8	.1	26.5
1989–90	Denver	80	80	27.6	.491	.400	**.880**	3.6	2.8	.6	.3	17.9
1990–91	Dallas	79	26	22.1	.439	.000	.850	3.2	1.3	.5	.3	9.7
Career		1,193	753	31.9	.507	.217^{[a]}	.832	5.5	3.6	.9	.7	21.5
All-Star		8	4	18.5	.500	.000	.500	2.3	1.9	.8	.5	9.1

- ^{a} The NBA adopted the three-point line in the 1979–80 season.

=== Playoffs ===
Year	Team	GP	GS	MPG	FG%	3P%	FT%	RPG	APG	SPG	BPG	PPG
1978	Milwaukee	9	–	23.1	**.615**	–	.781	4.7	1.4	.7	.8	13.4
1982	Denver	3	–	39.3	.473	.000	.857	7.7	5.7	1.0	**1.0**	19.3
1983	Denver	7	–	38.6	.447	.000	.887	6.3	**6.0**	.6	**1.0**	25.9
1984	Denver	5	–	**40.6**	.588	.000	**.893**	**8.0**	5.6	.6	.4	29.0
1985	Denver	**14**	**14**	38.3	.536	.000	.890	6.6	4.5	**1.2**	.4	**30.2**
1986	Denver	10	10	39.4	.463	.000	.859	3.5	5.2	.4	.4	27.3
1987	Denver	3	3	25.3	.510	.000	.857	4.7	3.3	.0	.0	18.7
1988	Denver	11	11	39.8	.455	.000	.814	5.4	4.4	.6	.3	24.3
1989	Denver	3	3	36.0	.516	.000	.875	4.3	3.7	.3	.0	26.0
1990	Denver	3	3	25.3	.568	.000	.818	3.0	3.0	.7	.3	19.7
Career		68	44^{[b]}	35.7	.503	.000^{[a]}	.862	5.5	4.3	.7	.5	24.4

- ^{a} The NBA adopted the three-point line in the 1979–80 season.
- ^{b} Incomplete statistics.

== See also ==
- List of National Basketball Association career games played leaders
- List of National Basketball Association career scoring leaders
- List of National Basketball Association franchise career scoring leaders
- List of National Basketball Association career turnovers leaders
- List of National Basketball Association annual scoring leaders
