= The American Game =

1979 film

- Directed by: Jay Freund; David Wolf
- Produced by: Anthony Jones; Peter Powell; Robert Kenner
- Starring: Nathaniel Bellamy Jr. Gil Ferschtman; Stretch Graham; Jules Irving; David Tawil; Brian Walker
- Distributed by: World Northal Corporation
- Release date: 1979
- Running time: 89 minutes
- Country: United States
- Language: English

The American Game is a 1979 documentary film directed by Jay Freund and David Wolf contrasting the experiences of two high-school seniors, basketball players from remarkably different backgrounds.

== Synopsis ==
Brian Walker is taken from his close-knit Indiana family, living in a small town. In contrast, Stretch Graham has practically no family support, and looks to his Brooklyn team and his warm-hearted coach for support. Both are actively being recruited by colleges.

== Cast ==
- Nathaniel Bellamy Jr as a basketball player
- Brian Walker as a basketball player
- Gil Ferschtman
- Stretch Graham
- Jules Irving
- David Tawil

== Reception ==
In a review for The New York Times, Janet Maslin described the film as one that "hovers precariously between personality study and overview, never fully committing itself to either avenue of exploration." She concluded that the film was best when sticking to the interview footage, but criticized the editing of the basketball sequences and the inclusion of "peppy" transitional sequences that look and sound like a "soft-drink comercial".
