= Roy Dow =

American basketball coach

WC Poets
- League: SCIAC

Career information
- College: Colby College
- Coaching career: 2016–present

Roy Dow is the head coach of the women’s basketball program at Whittier College.

== Education and playing career ==
Dow has a B.A. in Government with a concentration in Public Policy from Colby College. He was a member of Colby College's nationally-ranked Men's Basketball team and was a starting pitcher for the baseball team, being named Most Improved Player on both teams.

== Coaching record ==
Dow's record whilst head coach at Whittier College.

Team	Role	Season	Record	SCIAC Finish
WC Poets	Head Coach	2021-22	16-9, 10-6 SCIAC (won SCIAC Tournament)	4th
WC Poets	Head Coach	2020-21	DNP (COVID)	--
WC Poets	Head Coach	2019-20	17-9, 11-5 SCIAC	2nd
WC Poets	Head Coach	2018-19	11-13, 7-9 SCIAC	5th
WC Poets	Head Coach	2017-18	10-15, 7-9 SCIAC	5th
WC Poets	Head Coach	2016-17	9-16, 8-8 SCIAC	6th
