= Through the Fire (2005 film) =

- Directed by: Jonathan Hock
- Produced by: Jonathan Hock; Philip A. Aromando; Diane Houslin; Christopher Kenneally; Asha Rubin
- Starring: Sebastian Telfair
- Cinematography: Alastair Christopher
- Edited by: Sam Citron; Steven Pilgrim
- Music by: Pete Miser; Duncan Sheik
- Distributed by: ESPN; Cinema Libre Studio; Crosstown Releasing
- Release dates: April 21, 2005 (Tribeca Film Festival); February 10, 2006 (United States)
- Running time: 103 minutes
- Country: United States
- Language: English

Through the Fire is a 2005 documentary film. The film focuses on Sebastian Telfair as he goes through his senior year at Abraham Lincoln High School in New York City. Throughout the film, Sebastian is faced with the choice between college in Louisville or making the jump from high school to the NBA.

== Synopsis ==
Since the age of nine, Sebastian Telfair has been a well known player on the basketball courts in his hometown of Brooklyn. Now entering his senior year of high school, Sebastian is determined to get his team, the Lincoln Railsplitters, to their third straight PSAL championship title. He is also faced with the decision to either attend the University of Louisville or make the jump from high school to the NBA in order to provide for his family and get them out of the projects of New York City. Telfair's environment also plays a big part in his life. He deals with a death and having the entire neighborhood depending on him to be next in the line of great New York point guards.

== Reception ==
On review aggregator website Rotten Tomatoes, the film holds an approval rating of 68% based on 31 reviews, with an average rating of 6.4/10.

== Awards ==
- 2005 AFI Fest - Audience Award for Best Documentary
- 2005 Urbanworld Film Festival - Best Documentary Feature
