= Morris Chalfen =

American sports executive and international impresario (1907-1979)

- Born: Morris Chalfen; June 3, 1907; Minneapolis, Minnesota, U.S.
- Died: November 4, 1979 (age 72); Minneapolis, Minnesota, U.S.
- Occupation: Sports entertainment executive
- Known for: Owner of the Minnesota Lakers (later Los Angeles Lakers)
- Spouse(s): Marty Collins (predeceased); Beverly Nesler
- Children: 5

Morris Chalfen (June 3, 1907 – November 4, 1979) was an international impresario and sports entertainment executive. He founded the Holiday On Ice show, and later purchased and relocated a near-extinct National Basketball League (NBL) franchise which became the Los Angeles Lakers.

== Biography ==
Chalfen was born in Minneapolis. He founded a bowling alley and a billiards parlor called Lincoln Recreation. In 1935, he founded and produced a roller‐skating show called Skating Vanties which toured nationally for a decade. In 1945, he joined fellow impresario Emery Gilbert of Milwaukee – who was producing ice skating shows at local hotels – and joined him in producing a larger ice show called Holiday on Ice in arenas.

In the late 1940s, impresario Morris Chalfen took "Holiday On Ice" to Mexico, Cuba, and Latin America, followed by an eight-month tour of Europe in 1950. Electric current was different from country to country, as were languages and currencies, and transportation costs were higher. But audiences were recovering from the devastation of World War II and hungry for the glamour, thrill, athleticism, and grandeur of his American ice show spectacle. And ice shows knew no language barrier. Having invented the ability to create a portable ice rink, Chalfen's Holiday on Ice could set up anywhere in the world and perform independent of permanent standing ice rink facilities. As a result, Chalfen became the only international American ice show, the first to play behind the Iron Curtain (during the Cold War), China, and around the globe. International elite and world leaders flocked to the American production wherever they played, including Soviet Premier Nikita Khrushchev, the Duke and Duchess of Windsor, Princess Grace and Prince Rainier of Monaco; King Constantine of Greece; King Carlos and Queen Sophia of Spain; the King of Thailand; and Diana, Princess of Wales. Even Elvis Presley attended a performance at the height of his fame, in 1958 in Germany while serving with the U.S. military. In 1965, he sold 80% of Holiday on Ice to The Madison Square Garden Company.

=== Lakers ===
The Lakers began in 1947 when Ben Berger and Morris Chalfen bought the Detroit Gems of the National Basketball League for $15,000 and relocated it to Minneapolis and renamed it the Lakers. They hired a general manager, Max Winter, and a coach, John Kundla, then began the hunt for players. As the Gems had by far the worst record in the NBL, the Lakers had the first pick in the 1947 dispersal draft of players from the Professional Basketball League of America, which they used to select George Mikan, later to become the greatest center of his time.

With Mikan, new coach John Kundla and an infusion of former University of Minnesota players, the Lakers won the NBL championship in that 1947–48 season and joined four other NBL teams in jumping to the Basketball Association of America, where they promptly won the 1948-49 BAA championship. The NBL and BAA merged to become the National Basketball Association (NBA) in 1949. In 1957, he and Berger sold the team to Bob Short. Three years later the team moved to Los Angeles.

== Personal life ==
In 1960, Chalfen's wife Marty Collins Chalfen and three children were killed in the crash of Northwest Orient Airlines Flight 710. Chalfen himself died at the age of 72 in 1979. He was survived by his second wife, Beverly Nesler; and two sons, Richard and John. Services were held at Temple Israel in Minneapolis.
