= Ben Berger =

American sports businessman

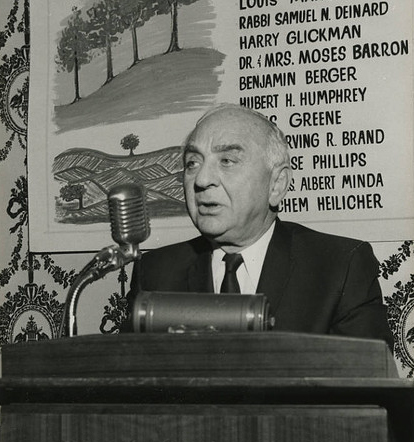
- Ben Berger speaking at the National Jewish Fund Dinner in 1967
- Born: Benjamin N. Berger; 1897; Ostrowiec Świętokrzyski, Poland
- Died: February 9, 1988 (aged 91); Minneapolis, Minnesota, U.S.
- Occupation: Sports entertainment executive
- Known for: Owner of the Minnesota Lakers (later Los Angeles Lakers)
- Spouse: Mildred Berger
- Children: 1

Benjamin N. Berger (1897 – February 9, 1988) was a Minneapolis businessman, perhaps best known for being one of the original owners of the Minneapolis Lakers which he bought from Detroit helped move to Minneapolis.

== Biography ==
Berger was born in Ostrowiec Świętokrzyski, Congress Poland and moved to the United States at age 16 in 1913 settling in Fargo, North Dakota. He became a U.S. citizen while serving in World War I. In 1921, he purchased his first movie house in Grand Forks, North Dakota which evolved into a chain of 19 theaters. In 1944, he bought Schiek's Cafe, a popular local nightclub.

In 1947, he along with Morris Chalfen bought the Detroit Gems of the National Basketball League (NBL). They relocated and renamed the team the Minneapolis Lakers. He co-owned the team until 1957. During those years the Lakers won six league titles (1 NBL and 5 BAA/NBA). They sold the team in 1957.

In the late 1950s, Berger was the owner and president of the minor league hockey team, the Minneapolis Millers.

His wife was Mildred Berger.

Mimi Ajzenstadt is the Mildred and Benjamin Berger Chair in Criminology at the Hebrew University of Jerusalem.

== Death ==
In February 1988, Berger suffered a stroke and died a week later at Mount Sinai Hospital in Minneapolis.
