= Holiday on Ice =

International ice shows

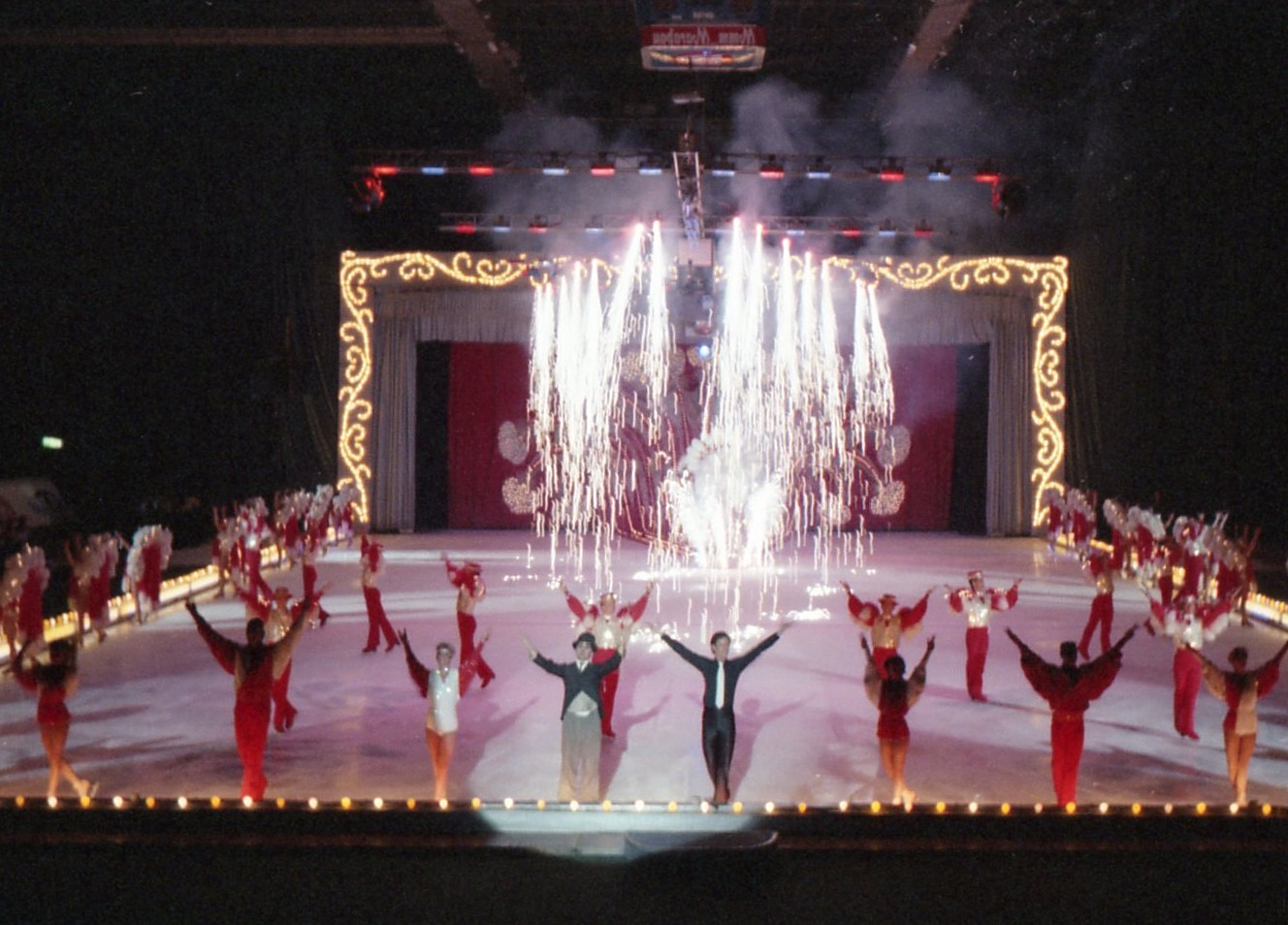
Holiday on Ice on April 4, 1986

Holiday on Ice is an ice show currently owned by Medusa Music Group GmbH, a subsidiary of CTS EVENTIM, Europe's largest ticket distributor, with its headquarters in Bremen, Germany.

== History ==
Holiday on Ice originated in the United States in December 1942. It was the brainchild of Emery Gilbert of Toledo, Ohio, an engineer and builder who created a portable ice rink. He took his idea of a traveling show to Morris Chalfen, a Minneapolis executive, who supplied the financing, and George Tyson, who used his theatrical background to create the show.

The touring show made its first international trip to Mexico in 1947. In 1946, the company expanded with another ice show and secondary unit, "Ice Vogues", which took over the Holiday's last season's production and extended it for another year making stops in Cuba and Hawaii. Then the Vogues toured in Central and South America while Holiday remained in North America. After 1956, the Ice Vogues became a second unit of Holiday on Ice.

After her touring company was shut down, Sonja Henie joined Holiday on Ice in 1953, remaining part of the show until 1956. Her first performance with the company was in Paris while her final show was in South America.

In Asia, Holiday on Ice first performed at the Philippine International Fair of 1953 in Manila; followed by a return visit in 1955. Starting in 1961, the company performed almost annually at the newly opened Araneta Coliseum under impresario J. Amado Araneta's auspices. HOI returned to the Araneta Coliseum in 1962, 1963 and 1965. The HOI company that performed in Manila was assembled in Europe and recruited cast members from Japan.

The U.S. was represented by Holiday on Ice at Brussels World Fair in 1958. While in 1959, the new Cultural Exchange Program allowed the company to travel to Russia. A Holiday on Ice show on October 31, 1963, was the scene of a gas leak and subsequent explosion at the Indiana State Fairgrounds Coliseum that killed 74 people.

All owners except Morris Chalfen sold their shares of the North America Holiday on Ice to Madison Square Garden Corporation in 1964, while Chalfen retained ownership of the international Holiday on Ice tour and remained as executive producer of the North America company.

By August 1971, General Ice Shows, Inc., a subsidiary of Thomas Scallen's Medical Investment Corporation (Medicor) and parent company of Ice Follies, had purchased Holiday on Ice (North America) from Chalfen and Madison Square Garden Company. At that time, Chalfen had purchased $2.2 million in Medicor convertible subordinated notes, which when converted to stock would have made Chalfen the largest shareholder of Medicor. Scallen had Medicor stall registering the notes and he sold 400,000 Medicor shares to Arthur Wirtz. After lawsuits by HoI's Chalfen and Wirtz in 1976, Wirtz gained ownership of both shows.

Mattel's Irvin & Kenneth Feld Productions purchased the Ice Follies and the Holiday on Ice (USA) from Chicago-based Wirtz for $12 million in 1979. Ice Follies merged with Holiday on Ice in 1980 operating as a combined show in 1980 and 1981. The first Disney's World on Ice began touring in 1981.

=== International company ===
In 1964, Chalfen retained ownership of the international Holiday on Ice tour separating ownership from the North America-based company.

After several changes of ownership, today it primarily tours with only two productions in Europe. In 1996, the company was purchased by Endemol Entertainment.

On October 2, 2014, the German Medusa Music Group GmbH, a subsidiary of CTS EVENTIM, Europe's largest ticket distributor, acquired 50% of Stage Entertainment Touring Productions and Holiday on Ice; the company would acquire the remaining 50% two years later, on July 8, 2016. Hence, Holiday on Ice has become a German company with Stage Entertainment no longer involved in it.

During the 1960s Holiday on Ice was introduced to the Philippines. Araneta Coliseum always was the venue until Disney on Ice came to Araneta Coliseum.

== Show ==
Holiday on Ice was established as a family-oriented show by its founders but it has retained little of the traditional ice revue format. The actual shows focus more on a theatrical/musical aspect rather than on the glamorous revue style with clouds of feathers and millions of sequins and rhinestones to attract a new, younger audience. The once large "Corps de Ballet" of skaters has been reduced from 24 girls + 12 boys to 20 girls + 10 boys (between 1998 and 2008), and 14 girls + 10 boys (from 2009) and elaborate costuming has been replaced in favour of small modern stylings. Also the music choice from mainly Broadway show scores has been changed and adapted to the contemporary taste of actual pop music and even rock. Novelty acts such as acrobats have been added regularly to the main production numbers in recent years.

A traditional element in each Holiday on Ice show is the precision number with its famous spinning wheel, in which the skaters link arms with each other, one by one, lengthening the two spokes which spin around a center point. For many years, the traditional kickline, the light finale with illuminated costumes and fireworks fountains, ended shows.

Since 1988 each show has been given an official name to expose its unique identity resulting from its main production theme that weaves the various numbers into a unitary presentation. Beginning in 2005, Holiday on Ice has added several family-oriented touring shows to their schedule, including Peter Pan, Bugs Bunny on Ice and Ali Baba in "1001 Nights on Ice" in their new branch kids Ice shows ("KISS").

In contrast to the North American skating tours Stars on Ice and Champions on Ice, which feature primarily World and Olympic champion figure skaters, most of the skaters who tour with Holiday on Ice are not famous, and the focus is on production quality rather than the skaters' competitive credentials.

In 2011, Stage Entertainment announced the foundation of another subsidiary company which combines all its touring live productions, one of which is Holiday on Ice. This new division, Stage Entertainment Touring productions, is chaired by Caspar Gerwe.

For the first time in its 69 years, Holiday on Ice did not stage a new show production under its own brand in 2012. In 2013 a new show choreographed by Mark Naylor was produced with the name "Platinum".

Robin Cousins has choreographed several of Holiday on Ice's recent shows. Former choreographers have included: Stephanie Andros, Willi Bietak, Marie Carr, Kevin J. Cottam, Francis Demarteau, Sarah Kawahara, Karen Kresge, Jérôme Savary, Ted Shuffle, Anthony Van Laast, Robin Cousins, Frank Wentink, Mark Naylor, Bart Doerfler, Christopher Dean, Kim Gavin and Francisco Negrin.

== Show themes by year (Holiday on Ice Europe) ==
- 2027
- 2026 Mirage
- 2025 Cinema of Dreams
- 2024 Horizons
- 2023 No Limits
- 2022 A New Day (resumption) / AURORE
- 2021 A New Day
- 2020 (No new production due to COVID-19 pandemic)
- 2019 Supernova - Journey to the stars
- 2018 Showtime
- 2017 Atlantis
- 2016 Time
- 2015 Believe
- 2014 Passion
- 2013 Platinum
- 2012 (No new production) but ICE AGE LIVE is presented
- 2011 Speed and Sleeping Beauty on ice (Stage Entertainment Russia)
- 2010 Festival and Snow Queen on ice (Stage Entertainment Russia)
- 2009 Tropicana and Nutcracker on ice (Stage Entertainment Russia)
- 2008 Energia
- 2007 Elements (Spirit) and Aladdin on Ice (KIDS)
- 2006 Mystery and Bugs Bunny on Ice (KIDS)
- 2005 Romanza and Peter Pan on Ice (KIDS)
- 2004 Fantasy (Dreams)
- 2003 Diamonds and Pinocchio on ice (KIDS)
- 2002 Hollywood
- 2001 Celebration
- 2000 In Concert
- 1999 Colours of Dance
- 1998 Xotika - Journey to the heart
- 1997 Extravaganza (Extraventura)
- 1996 Evolution and Asterix On Ice
- 1995 Broadway / Gypsy
- 1994 Jubilee and Circus on ice
- 1993 Spanish / Aladdin
- 1992 Magic & Illusions
- 1991 Carmen & Robin Hood
- 1990 Banjos & Balalaikas
- 1989 Journey through Time
- 1988 Around the World in 80 Days
- 1987 Italian / Chinese
- 1986 Mexican / Russian
- 1985 Disco / Scottish
- 1984 Counterpoint / Sleeping Beauty
- 1983 Paris / Swan Lake
- 1982 Bolero / Shangri-La
- 1981 Oriental / Western
- 1980 (No new production due to movement of headquarters to Bern/Switzerland and Amsterdam/The Netherlands) but HOI presented the show : BOLERO / MAZEL'TOV
- 1979 24 Hours / Cinderella
- 1979 La Traviata / Hollywood
- 1978 Alice / Flamenco
- 1977 Pink Panther / Dickens
- 1976 Snoopy / Hollywood
- 1975 Bicentennial
- 1974 Chicago / Gershwin
- 1973 Spartacus / Cabaret
- 1972 Rock / Chevalier
- 1971 Asterix / Bolero
- 1970 Fairy Tales
- 1969 Showboat
- 1968 King Arthur
- 1967 Aladdin / Space Show
- 1966 Marco Polo
- 1965 Gypsy / Dolly
- 1964 Hong Kong
- 1963 Operama
- 1962 Indian / Jazz
- 1961 Black Pearl / Circus
- 1960 Wizard
- 1959 Aladdin
- 1958 Nutcracker
- 1957 Bolero
- 1956 Merry Widow / Alice
- 1955 Rhapsody / Red Velvet and Aladdin on ice
- 1954 Wonder Garden / Spanish
- 1953 Jungle / Sea and SONJA HENIE and her ice revue
- 1952 Pink / Carnival
- 1951 Indians / Candy
- 1950 Winter / Gay Nineties

== Show themes by year (Holiday on Ice USA) ==
- 1984 / 1985 : Ice around the world : Cinderella / San Francisco (HOLIDAY ON ICE)
- 1971 to 1982 : Ice follies productions in second and third tour under the name HOLIDAY ON ICE USA
- 1970 Sonja Henie / London
- 1969 New Year's / Easter/Christmas
- 1968 New York / Granada
- 1967 Country / Caribbean
- 1966 Venetian / Happy Land
- 1965 Americana / 24 Hours
- 1964 Blue waltz / Fiesta Caribe
- 1963 Barn dance / Clock shop
- 1962 Sleeping Beauty / Broadway
- 1961 Hawaii / Southland
- 1960 Golden Aurora
- 1959 Crystal anniversary / Circus
- 1958 Girls / Holiday
- 1957 Waterama / Fiesta
- 1956 Bacchus / Cavalcade
- 1955 Bolero / Guardsmen
- 1954 Storybook / Games
- 1953 Caribbean / Gaucho
- 1952 Japan / Fantasy
- 1951 Jewel / Carnival
- 1950 Candyland / Rhapsody
- 1949 Rumbalero / Enchanted Garden
- 1948 Spanish / Dreams
- 1947 Persian / Gypsy
- 1946 Winter Carnival / Horse show
- 1945 Faster on ice / Rhythmacana
- 1944 / 1945 : no new show but the second edition 1943/1944 performed until December 1944
- 1943 / 1944 Victor Herbert / Minstrels
- 1942 / 1943 Winter Holiday / Gladiators
