= History of the Los Angeles Lakers =

Sports team history

The Los Angeles Lakers franchise has a long and storied history, having played and won championships in both the National Basketball League (NBL) and the Basketball Association of America (BAA) prior to the 1949 merger which formed the National Basketball Association (NBA). The franchise traces its roots to the NBL's Detroit Gems which was launched in 1946 and relocated to Minneapolis in 1947 to become the Lakers.

The Lakers are one of the NBA's most famous and successful franchises. As of August 2024, the Lakers are second in the NBA's all-time records for wins (3,550) and winning percentage (.591), and hold the all-time record for most NBA Finals appearances (32). They are second in NBA championship wins with 17, just behind the Boston Celtics with 18 NBA titles, and with nine more Finals appearances than the Celtics, their biggest rival. Their team has had many NBA legends, including George Mikan, Jim Pollard, Clyde Lovellette, Elgin Baylor, Jerry West, Wilt Chamberlain, Gail Goodrich, Kareem Abdul-Jabbar, Jamaal Wilkes, James Worthy, Magic Johnson, Shaquille O'Neal, Kobe Bryant, Pau Gasol, LeBron James, and Anthony Davis.

== 1946–1958: Detroit beginnings and Minneapolis dynasty ==
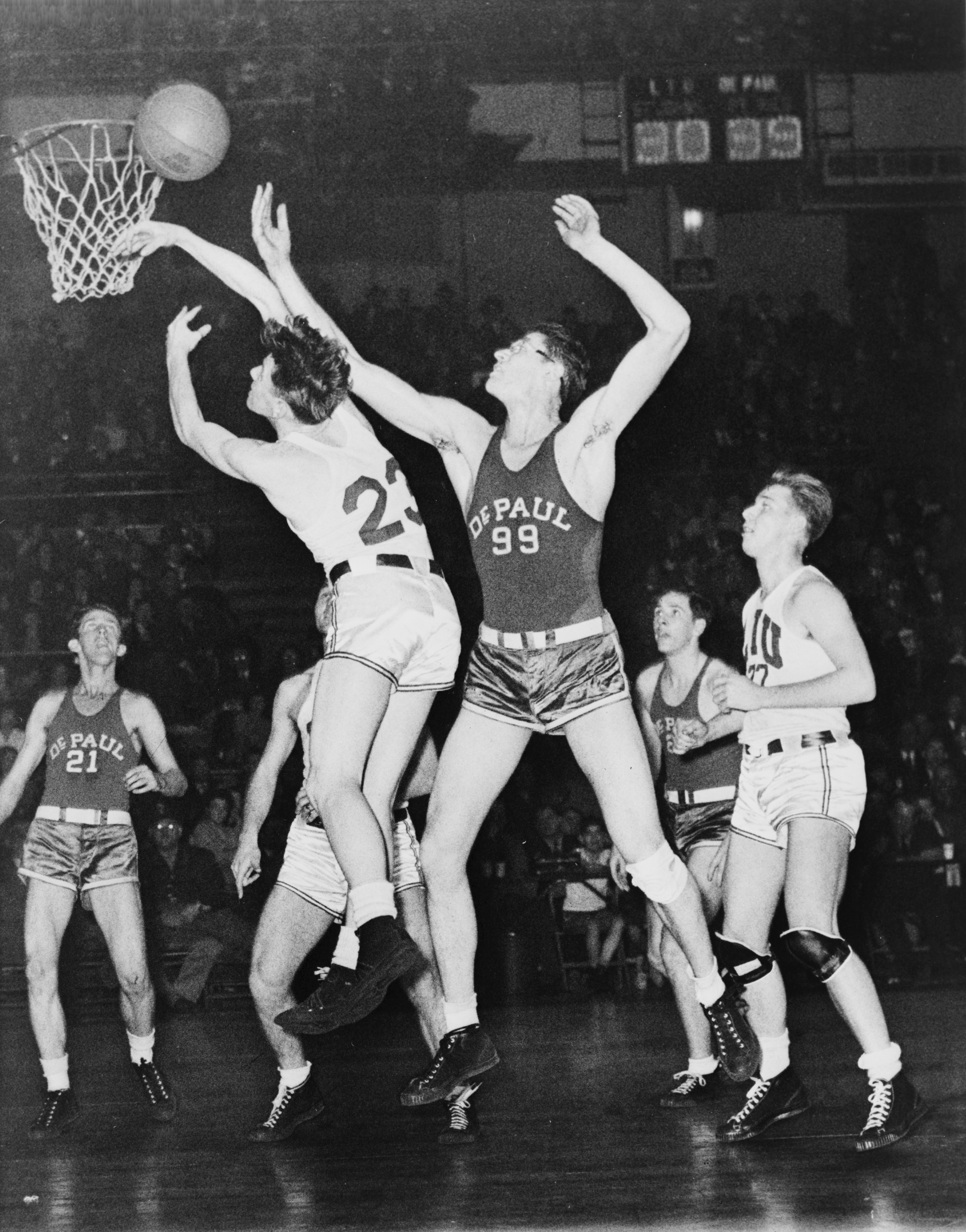
Hall of Famer George Mikan (#99) led the Lakers franchise to their first five NBA championships. He is described by the NBA's official website as the "first superstar" in league history.

The franchise was founded in 1946 as the Detroit Gems, led by founder/owner C. King Boring and his business partner Maurice Winston, and played in the National Basketball League (NBL) during the 1946–47 season where it finished last in the league with only 4 wins in 44 games. Though the team was scheduled to continue in the NBL the following season, its ownership, faced with high losses due to low attendance and lack of homecourt, decided on selling the team to Ben Berger and Morris Chalfen of Minnesota for $15,000 in June 1947. Minneapolis sportswriter Sid Hartman played a key behind-the-scenes role in helping put together the deal and later the team, including helping them hire John Kundla from College of St. Thomas, to be their first head coach, by meeting with him and selling him on the team.

Berger and Chalfen relocated the team to Minneapolis, with home games being played at both the Minneapolis Auditorium and the Minneapolis Armory. The franchise was re-christened the "Lakers" in reference to Minnesota's nickname, "The Land of 10,000 Lakes". Berger and Chalfen brought in Max Winter, later to become a founder and owner of the National Football League's Minnesota Vikings, to be the Lakers' new general manager. Winter also took an ownership stake in the team, which he would maintain until he left the Lakers in 1955.

The acquisition of the franchise left the team with no players of value and the former ownership had sold away the few players it drafted in the 1947 NBL draft before the sale. As the Gems had recorded by far the worst record in the NBL, the Lakers had the first pick in the 1947 Professional Basketball League of America dispersal draft, which they used to select George Mikan, later to become one of the greatest centers of his time. With Mikan, new coach Kundla and an infusion of former University of Minnesota players to replace those lost prior to the relocation, the Lakers won the NBL championship in their first season. A week prior to the NBL finals, the Lakers won the annual World Professional Basketball Tournament, where Mikan was named MVP after scoring a tournament-record 40 points against the New York Renaissance in the title-clinching game.

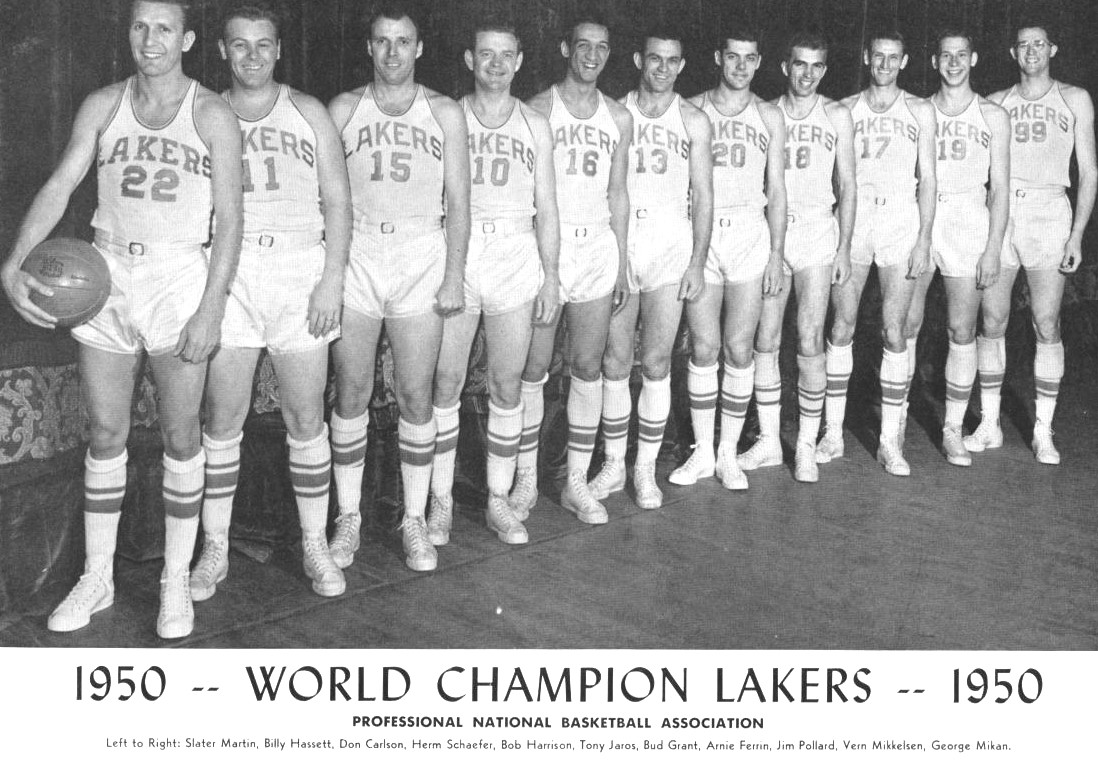
The 1949–50 NBA champion Minneapolis Lakers

The following season, the Lakers switched to the 12-team Basketball Association of America (BAA) and proceeded to win the championship in that season. The next year saw the merging of the NBL and the BAA to form the National Basketball Association, and the Lakers won the inaugural NBA championship on the backs of Mikan, Vern Mikkelsen, and future National Football League coach Bud Grant.

The Lakers' three-year streak of championships came to an end in 1951, when they lost to the Rochester Royals in the NBA Western Division Finals. Nevertheless, they rebounded from that defeat to capture the title for the next three consecutive years, thus becoming the NBA's first "dynasty", having won six NBL/BAA/NBA championships in seven years. In addition to Mikan and Mikkelsen, the Lakers teams of these years also featured future Hall of Famers Jim Pollard, Slater Martin, and Clyde Lovellette. During this time, the team also participated in the lowest-scoring game in NBA history; on November 22, 1950, the Lakers fell to the Fort Wayne Pistons by a score of 19–18. This contest later proved to be a factor in the league's introduction of the shot clock.

Three days before the start of the 1954–55 season training camp in September 1954, Mikan unexpectedly announced his retirement from basketball. Without him, Lovellette led the Lakers in scoring and to the Western Division finals where the team lost 3–1 to the Fort Wayne Pistons. After stumbling to a 14–21 record to start the 1955–56 season, Mikan was persuaded to come out of retirement in January 1956 for the second half of the season to backup Lovellette. With Mikan, the Lakers made the playoffs but lost to the St. Louis Hawks in the Western Division semifinals.

After Mikan's second retirement, attendance at Lakers games dropped off sharply. On February 23, 1957, the team was nearly sold to St. Louis businessman, Milton Fischmann and former Chicago White Sox manager, Marty Marion for $150,000, before Minneapolis Star and Tribune executive sports editor, Charles O. Johnson, stepped in to plea the owners to give local interests a chance. They gave in to Johnson's demands, and set a deadline for March 5, before they would transfer the sale over to Fischmann and Marion. Berger and Chalfen would extend the deadline to March 13, two days later. On that day, a local group helmed by businessman Bob Short successfully matched and exceeded the asking price, to purchase and keep the team in Minneapolis for $200,000, after coming up $11,000 short with two days remaining. The league would approve the sale on April 5, before the stocks officially transferred to the new owners four days later. The new ownership was unable to cure the team's financial ills, however.

The Lakers found their way back to the playoffs in 1957 when they lost to the Hawks once more. The following year was disastrous, however, as Mikan became head coach before realizing he was not suited to the task. After compiling a 9–30 record, he stepped aside in favor of Kundla, but the Lakers found themselves last in the league that year with a 19–53 record.

== 1958–1968: Baylor and West duo – Move to Los Angeles and Celtics rivalry ==
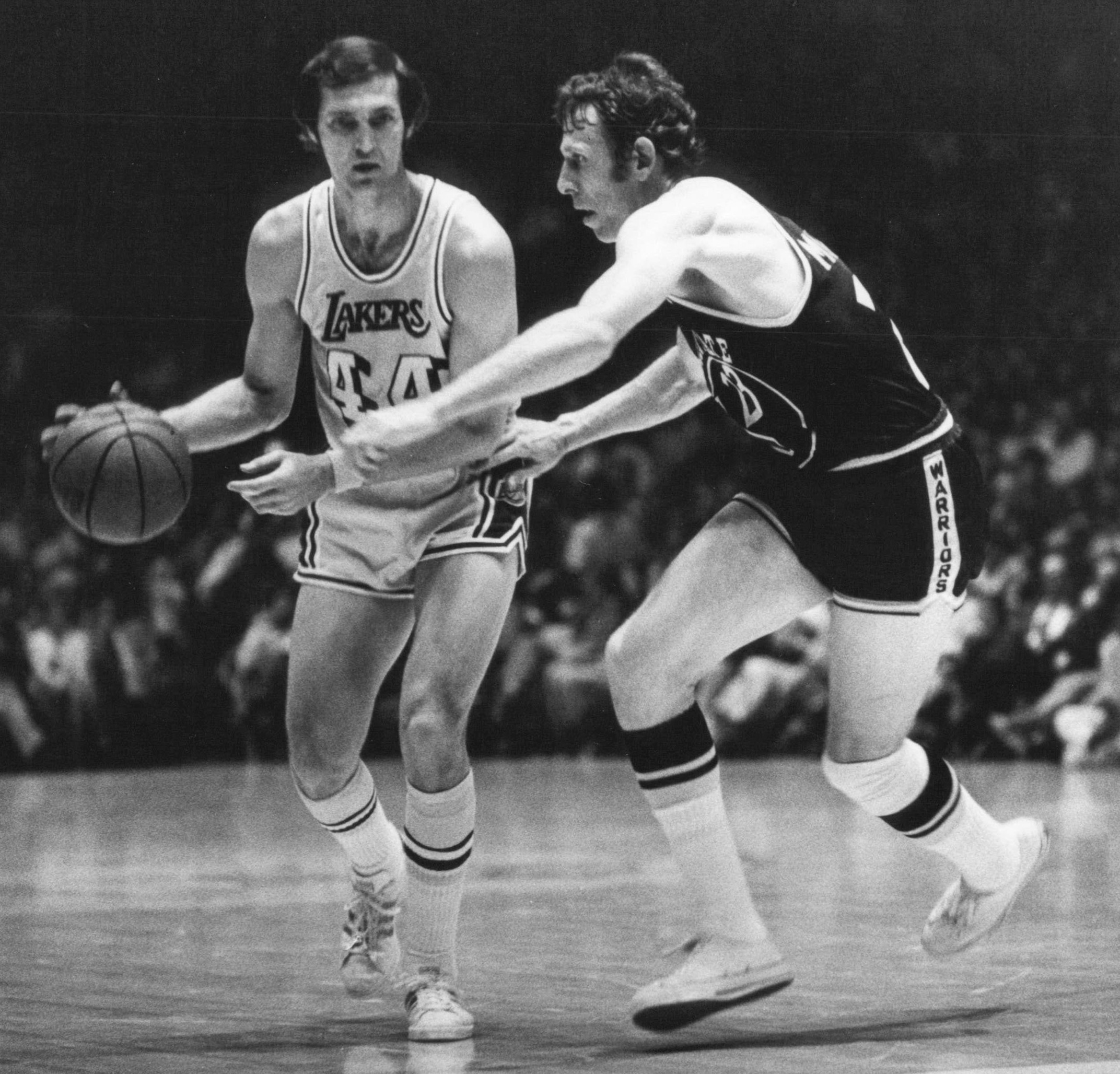
Jerry West (#44) led the team to nine NBA Finals appearances in the 1960s and 1970s. Nicknamed "Mr. Clutch", his silhouette is featured on the NBA's official logo.

Last place, however, meant the first pick in the draft, and the Lakers chose wisely, picking Elgin Baylor, who went on to win the NBA Rookie of the Year Award after averaging 24.9 points per game and 15.0 rebounds per game. In 1959, Baylor and Mikkelsen were able to lead the team past their recent nemesis, the Hawks, and into the Finals, where they fell to the then-emerging Boston Celtics in the first four-game sweep in NBA Finals history. This marked the start of the long rivalry between the two teams. 1960 saw the Lakers start poorly, but they managed to make the playoffs with a meager 25–50 record. They were defeated again, however, by the Hawks.

In 1958, the Brooklyn Dodgers of Major League Baseball moved to Los Angeles and quickly became a huge financial success. Short did not fail to notice this. After considering moves to Chicago and San Francisco, he decided to move the franchise to Los Angeles before the 1960–61 season, making the Lakers the NBA's first West Coast team. The Lakers did not change their name after this second move, despite the general scarcity of natural lakes in southern California. Minneapolis, meanwhile, would remain without an NBA franchise until the debut of the Minnesota Timberwolves in 1989.

Besides the relocation to Los Angeles, a second big change to the team was the addition of point guard Jerry West. A third was the hiring of West's college coach Fred Schaus to helm the team, and a fourth was the post-season addition of Francis Dayle "Chick" Hearn as the Lakers' play-by-play announcer. Hearn would go on to hold that post for the next 41 years.

The new Los Angeles Lakers, behind Baylor's 34.8 points per game and 19.8 rebounds per game, improved on the previous year's results before losing once more to the Hawks in the Western Conference Finals. The duo of Baylor and West proved to be lethal and they both finished among the NBA's top 10 scorers for the next four years. Baylor was called to active military duty during the 1961–62 season following the Berlin crisis and was only available on weekends. Nevertheless, Baylor and West went on to average 38.3 and 30.8 points per game respectively during the regular season. The Lakers were able to pull together and make the NBA Finals, only to lose heartbreakingly to a now dominant Celtics team. Baylor set a record for most points scored in a playoff game with 61, which stood for 25 years and is still an NBA Finals and regulation game record. The Celtics defeated the Lakers twice more in the Finals over the next three years.

September 1965 saw another team upheaval when Short sold the team to Canadian-American entrepreneur Jack Kent Cooke for $5 million. Also, rookie Gail Goodrich joined the team.

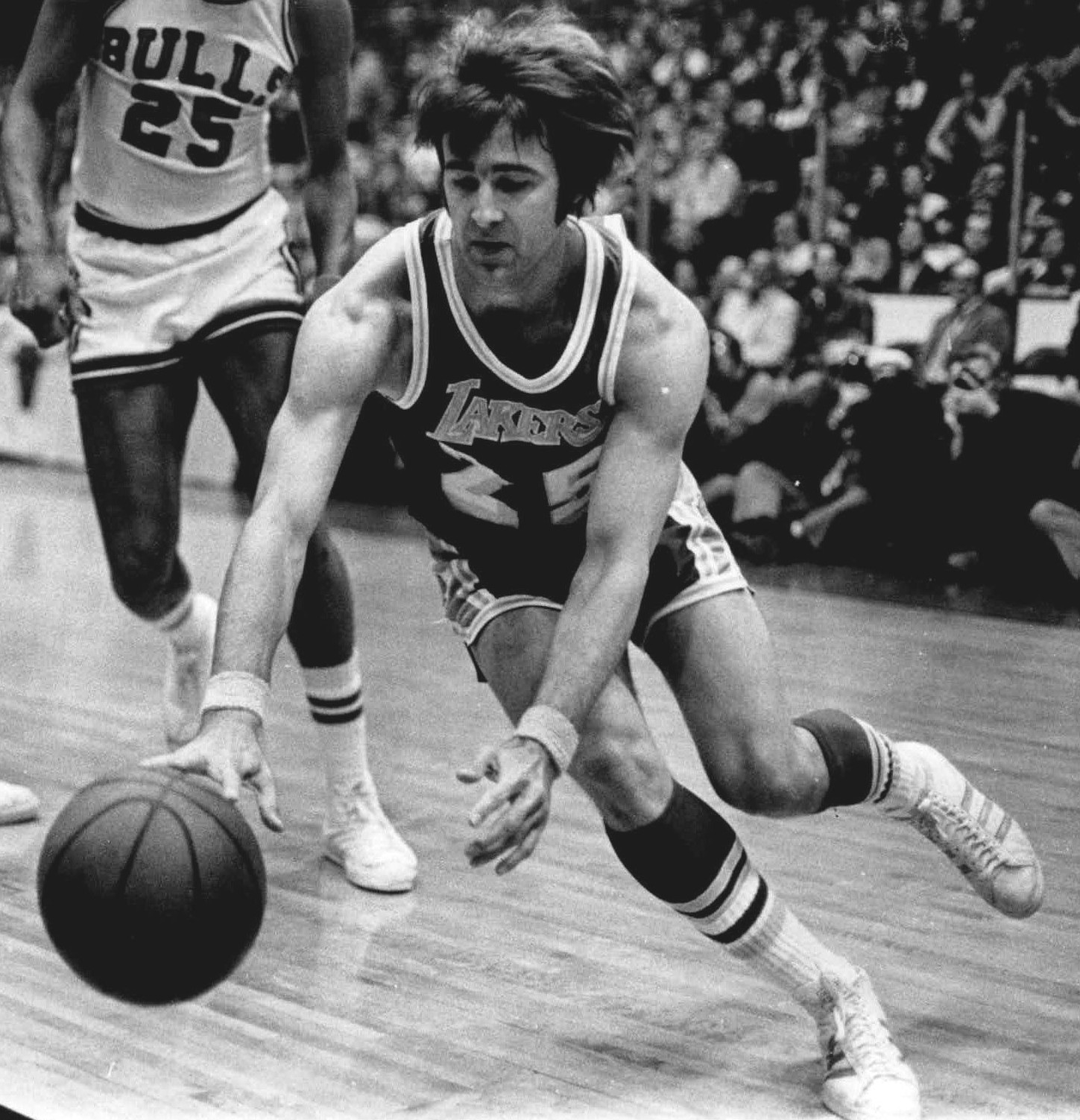
Hall of Famer Gail Goodrich was a Laker for nine seasons in the 1960s and 1970s, and played in four NBA Finals.

On November 20 of that year, the Lakers played the San Francisco Warriors in Las Vegas. The game was notable because Chick Hearn was not present to announce it. He had gone to Fayetteville, Arkansas to announce a college football game, and inclement weather had prevented his flight from being able to leave in time for him to make it to Las Vegas for the Lakers game. It was only the second game he had missed for the Lakers since starting with the team in 1961. It was also the last game he would miss for the next 36 years. Beginning on November 21, 1965, Hearn announced the next 3,338 consecutive Laker regular season and playoff games. As for the team that season, the Lakers would find themselves in the Finals once again in 1966, promptly losing to the Celtics once again.

The Lakers moved to Cooke's brand-new arena, The Forum, in 1967 with new coach Bill van Breda Kolff. That year saw the team repeat its now-bitter pattern, losing to the Celtics in the 1968 NBA Finals.

== 1968–1975: The Baylor/West/Chamberlain trio ==
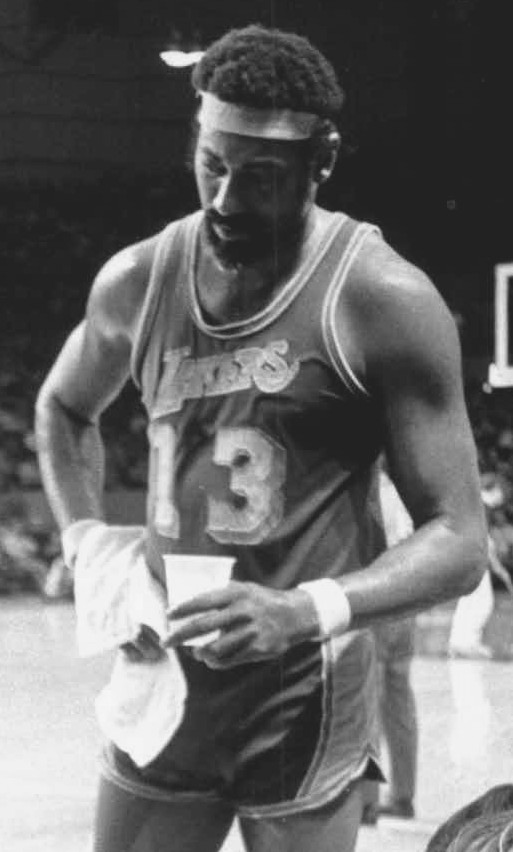
Wilt Chamberlain played for Los Angeles for five seasons during the late 1960s and early 1970s. He was an integral part of their 1971–72 team that is considered one of the best in NBA history.

It had become clear that the Lakers needed to counter the great Celtics center, Bill Russell. Thus Cooke obtained Wilt Chamberlain from the Philadelphia 76ers, hoping to supplement the aging and ailing Baylor. The move seemed at first to have worked, as the 1969 Lakers proceeded to compile a better record than the Celtics behind Chamberlain's league-leading 21.1 rebounds per game. The two clubs met once again in the NBA Finals, but for the first time, the Lakers had the advantage as they were clearly considered the better team entering the series by most observers. However, they once again failed to top their rivals and the Celtics emerged from the series as victorious yet again, winning their 11th NBA Championship in 13 seasons. That 1969 championship series is also notable in that Jerry West was named the first-ever Finals MVP; this remains the only time a member of the losing team has won the award.

1970 saw Jerry West win the NBA scoring title at 31.2 points per game, and the Lakers returned to the Finals where, for the first time since moving to Los Angeles, they did not have to face the Celtics. This time it was the New York Knicks, a team that included future Lakers coach Phil Jackson. West made a memorable 60-foot shot as the fourth-quarter buzzer sounded in Game 3, forcing that game into overtime and helping West earn the nickname "Mr. Clutch". However, the Knicks recovered from what might have seemed a crushing blow and took the game in overtime.

In Game 5, Knicks center Willis Reed tore a muscle in his leg and it looked as if he would not play again in the series. However, the Knicks found a way to win Game 5 without him. Afterward, the Lakers took Game 6 to force a seventh and final game back in New York. With everyone speculating as to his status for the game, Reed created one of the most memorable moments in NBA history as he came out of the Madison Square Garden tunnel and onto the court to start Game 7. To the roar of the crowd, Reed scored the first two baskets and the Knicks were off and running. Reed left the game for good at halftime, but the inspired Knicks already had a 24-point lead at that point and went on to rout the Lakers. It was Los Angeles' seventh NBA Finals failure in the last nine years.

The next year would not be the Lakers' year either. Baylor played in only two games due to injuries, and the Milwaukee Bucks, led by Lew Alcindor (now Kareem Abdul-Jabbar), defeated Los Angeles in the Western Conference Finals. That year, however, did see the Laker debut of their future coach, Pat Riley.

No one could have foreseen the team's domination the next season, however. Bill Sharman had been installed as the new head coach, and on the afternoon of November 9, 1971, just nine games into the season, the legendary Elgin Baylor retired, finally accepting that his injuries would no longer allow him to play professional basketball. That very evening, the Lakers proceeded to win the first game of what would turn out to be a 33-game winning streak; the streak was snapped with a loss to the Bucks on January 9, 1972. The streak shattered the previous NBA record of 20 consecutive victories, which happened to have been set by the Bucks the year before. To this day, the Lakers' 33-game winning streak remains the longest winning streak in the history of any major North American professional sport.

The Lakers set another record in 1972 by winning 69 games; this mark would stand for nearly a quarter of a century. Los Angeles led the league in scoring, rebounds, and assists, and Sharman was named Coach of the Year. Chamberlain led the NBA in field goal percentage and rebounding, and West led the NBA in assists. Not only that, but the Lakers at long last shook the monkey off their back, conquering the Knicks in the 1972 NBA Finals to claim their first NBA title since 1954 and their first since moving to Los Angeles.

The Lakers would fall to the Knicks in the Finals in 1973, and Chamberlain, who had set a record for field-goal percentage that year, making 72.7% of his shots, announced his retirement. West followed suit a year after that and the Lakers bottomed out in 1975, finishing 30–52 and failing to make the playoffs for the first time in 17 years.

== 1975–1979: The Captain – Kareem Abdul-Jabbar ==
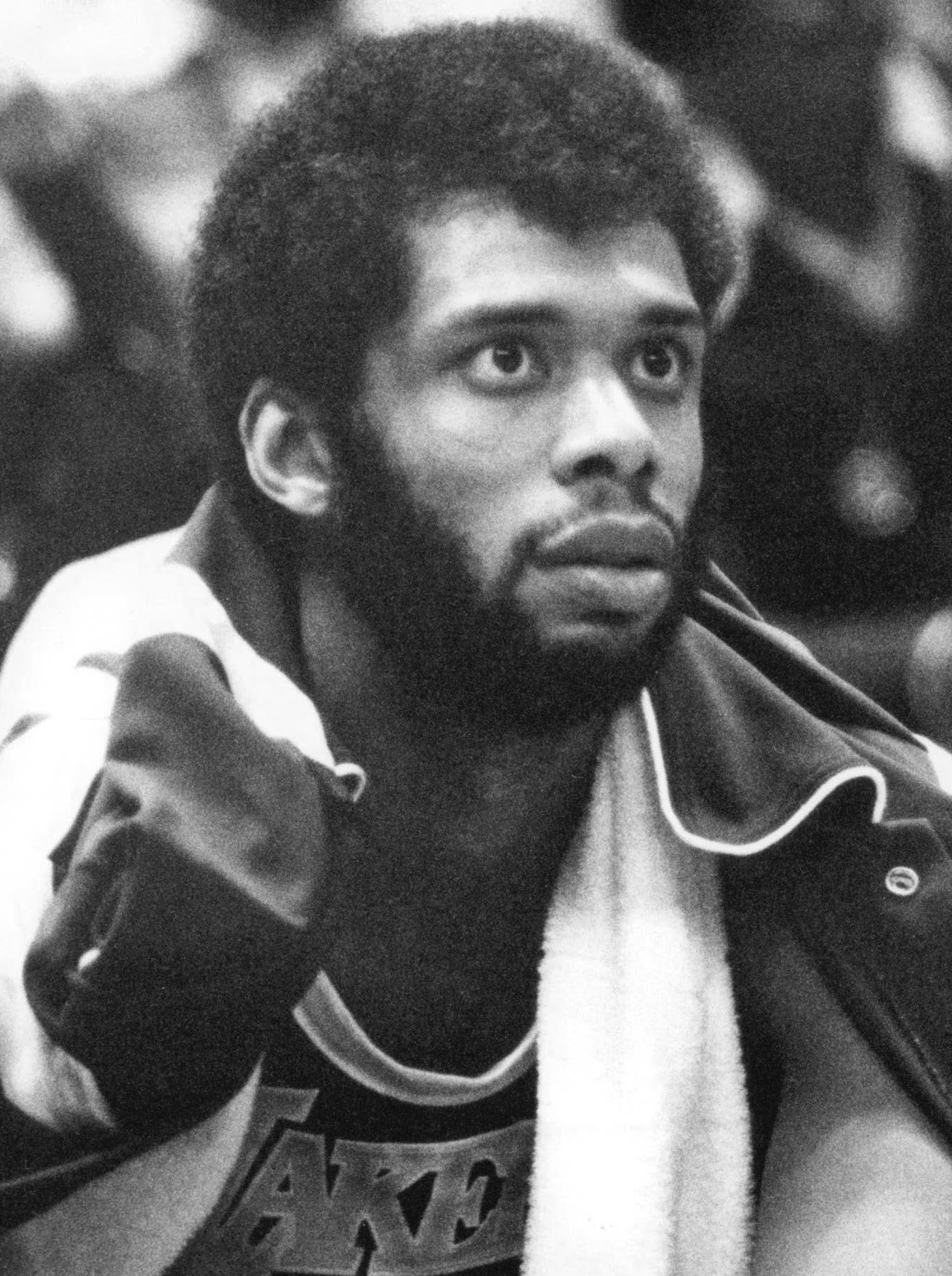
Los Angeles acquired Kareem Abdul-Jabbar in 1975. He won three MVP awards, one Finals MVP trophy and five championships with Los Angeles.

Alcindor, now known as Kareem Abdul-Jabbar, wanted out of Milwaukee, and the Lakers acquired him in a trade. His first year in Los Angeles resulted in his fourth NBA Most Valuable Player Award, after he averaged 27.7 points per game, and led the NBA with 16.9 rebounds per game and 4.12 blocked shots per game. But the Lakers failed to make the playoffs again at 40–42 (meanwhile, Milwaukee went from last to first in their division despite finishing the season with a losing record). The Lakers returned to form in 1976–77, with the NBA's best record at 53–29. After beating the Warriors, they were swept 4–0 in the Western Conference Finals by Bill Walton's eventual NBA champion Portland Trail Blazers.

December 9, 1977, saw one of the ugliest moments in professional sports history. Future Laker coach Rudy Tomjanovich, then of the Houston Rockets, ran onto the court in an attempt to break up a fight between the Lakers' Kermit Washington and the Rockets' Kevin Kunnert. Washington, in the corner of his eye, saw that an opposing player was rushing toward him. Instinctively thinking that he was going to be attacked, Washington turned and landed a devastating blow to Tomjanovich's face, with the unsuspecting Tomjanovich running headlong directly into the punch.

Tomjanovich was hit so hard that he said that his first thought upon waking up was that the arena's scoreboard must have fallen from the ceiling onto him. The punch had cracked Tomjanovich's skull and nearly ended his career. He sat out the rest of the season, needing reconstructive surgery to repair his jaw, eye, and cheek. Some of those who witnessed the event said that the blow was so crushing that until they saw Tomjanovich moving as he lay on the floor, they feared that he might have been killed.

Washington received a punishment of a 60-game suspension and a fine, and the incident remains a dark chapter in Laker history. The shocking scene became the defining moment of not only the Rockets' 1977–78 season (a conference finals team the previous year, they collapsed into last place with a 28–54 record), but also of two players' professional careers. Tomjanovich spent the next five months in rehab, eventually returning to play as an NBA all-star.

In 1977–78, the Lakers finished only 4th in their division at 45–37 and were sent home in the playoffs by the SuperSonics. The following season saw a 47–35 record and third in the division. They beat the Denver Nuggets in the playoffs and once again fell to the eventual champion SuperSonics.

== 1979–1991: Showtime Lakers ==
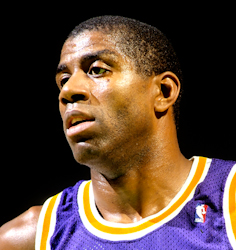
Point guard Magic Johnson led the "Showtime" Lakers to five NBA titles in the 1980s.

Before the 1979–80 season, Cooke sold the team to Dr. Jerry Buss, a Santa Monica real estate developer. That year also found the Lakers holding the top overall draft pick in the Western Conference, compensation for Goodrich's departure via free agency three years earlier to the New Orleans Jazz. At the time, the overall top pick in the draft was decided by a coin toss between the two teams with the top picks in each respective conference. The Eastern Conference team was the Chicago Bulls. The Lakers won the coin toss and selected Earvin "Magic" Johnson, who had just led Michigan State University to the NCAA championship, and was along with Indiana State University forward Larry Bird one of the top prospects in the 1979 draft.

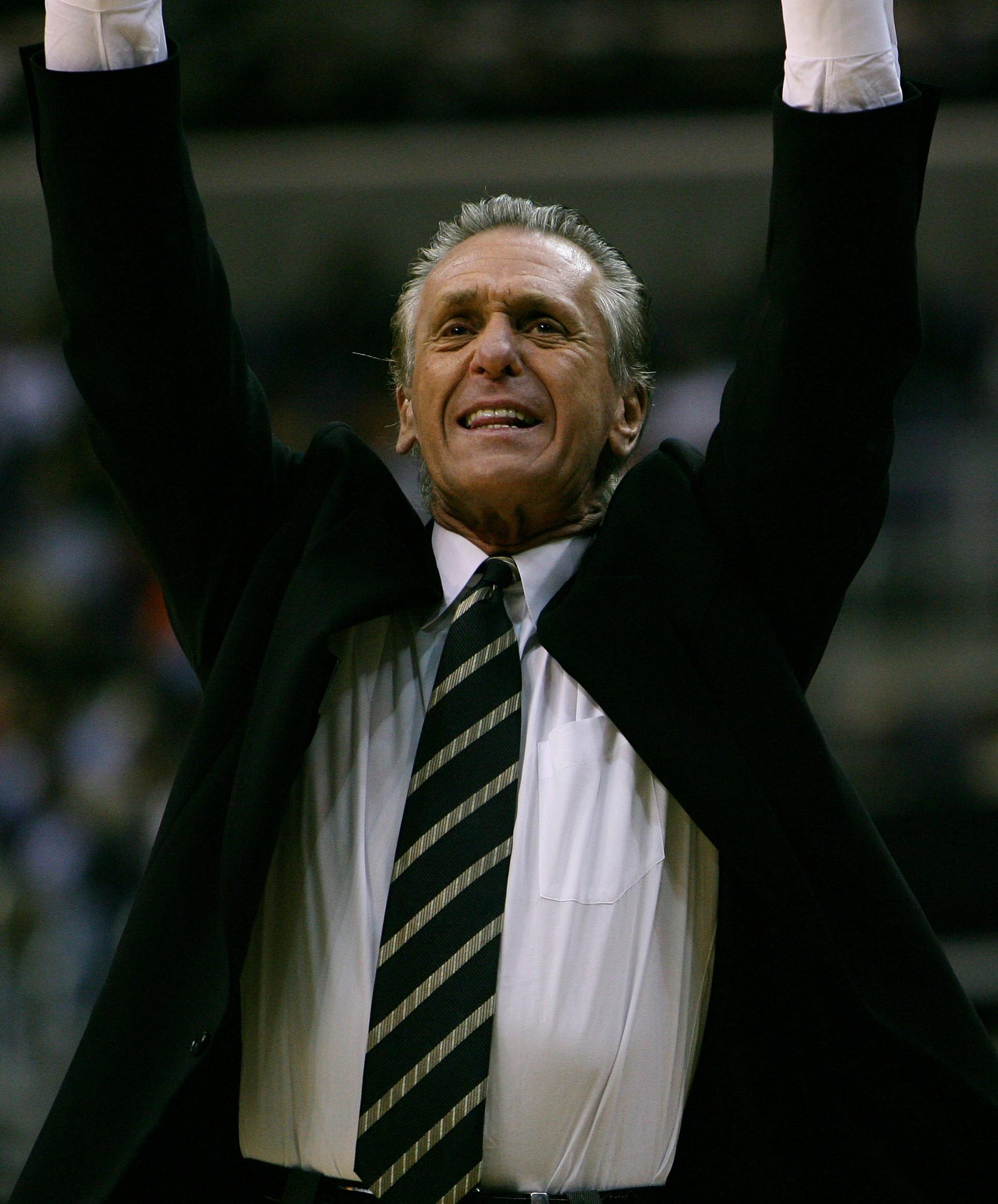
Head coach Pat Riley engineered the fast-break offense to the trademark Showtime-era Lakers, earning four championships in the process.

Just 14 games into the season, the Lakers' rookie head coach, Jack McKinney suffered a serious head injury in a bicycle accident. Assistant coach Paul Westhead stepped in as the team's new head coach. Officially, Westhead began his head coaching term serving as the "interim" head coach. But the severity of McKinney's injury meant a long convalescence, and that combined with Westhead's subsequent success in the job ultimately meant that McKinney would not return to the Lakers. Westhead's promotion to the head coaching position also meant there was an assistant's post open, for which the Lakers hired then-TV commentator Pat Riley to fill in. Kareem Abdul-Jabbar had a fantastic year (earning his sixth and final MVP award) as the Lakers won 60 regular season games. They beat the Suns and SuperSonics in the playoffs and then defeated Julius Erving's 76ers to win the NBA championship, behind an incredible Game 6 performance by the rookie Magic Johnson, who scored 42 points, pulled 15 rebounds, and dished 7 assists, while starting at center for an injured Abdul-Jabbar. That alone won Johnson the first of his three Finals MVP awards.

The accomplishment would soon be followed by ugliness for the team, however. In a season that was marred by Johnson missing a large portion of time due to injury and a general state of unrest and dissension in the locker room, the Lakers stunningly fell in the first round of the 1981 NBA Playoffs to the Houston Rockets, who went on to the NBA Finals despite a 40–42 regular season record. The next season also began in rocky fashion, as Coach Westhead attempted to restructure the offense in a way that Magic Johnson opposed. Johnson was so upset that he demanded to be traded. Buss, however, sided with the star player over the head coach, and he fired Westhead just 11 games into the season. The fan reaction to Johnson for having triggered his head coach's firing was immediate and Johnson found himself roundly booed, even by the Lakers' home crowd in Los Angeles.

Nonetheless, under the tutelage of new head coach Pat Riley, the Lakers returned to the finals that year by beating Phoenix and San Antonio in the playoffs. In the 1982 NBA Finals they defeated the 76ers in six games for their second league crown in three years. Furthermore, they found themselves again with the top overall draft pick, thanks to a trade two years earlier with the last-place Cleveland Cavaliers. This marked the first time that a reigning NBA champion also had the first pick in the draft. The Lakers used that pick to select James Worthy. Worthy had a strong rookie campaign, but he broke his leg at the end of the season and could only watch helplessly as the Lakers, also hobbled by injuries in the post-season to Bob McAdoo and Norm Nixon, were swept by the powerful 76ers, led by regular season and Finals MVP Moses Malone, in the 1983 NBA Finals.

Byron Scott joined the team the next year, in a trade for the popular Norm Nixon, and the Lakers got off to a roaring start. Kareem Abdul-Jabbar set the NBA's all-time scoring record against Utah on April 5, 1984, topping Wilt Chamberlain's 31,419. The Lakers returned to the finals to face Larry Bird's Boston Celtics. The 1984 Finals were a brutal slugfest with games 1, 2, 5, and 7 played in the June heat and humidity of Boston Garden. The Celtics won the last match 111–102 to clinch the championship.

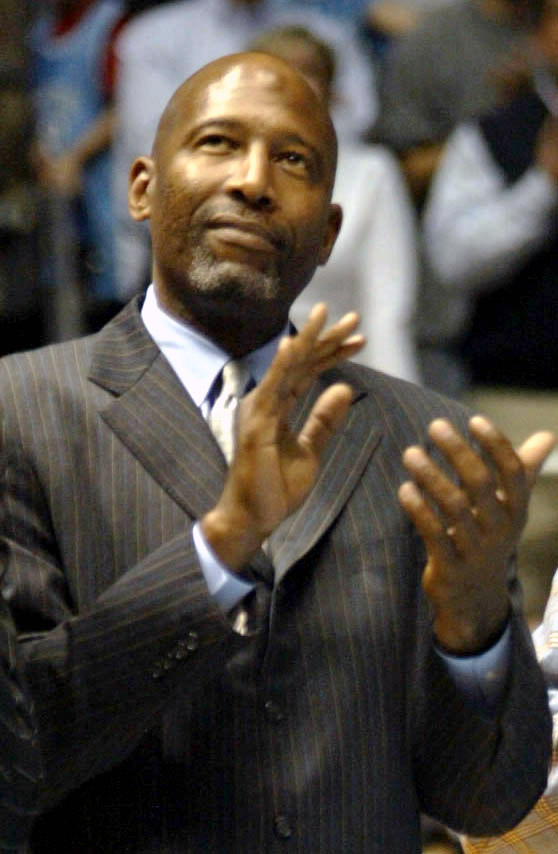
James Worthy won the Finals MVP trophy after recording his only career triple double in Game 7 against Pistons in the 1988 NBA Finals.

By the 1984–85 season, the Lakers' so-called "Showtime" era was in full swing. Showtime was a fast-paced style of basketball, described as a mix of "no-look passes off the fastbreak, pin-point alley-oops from halfcourt, spinning feeds and overhand bullets under the basket through triple teams." The team won the Pacific Division for the fourth straight year, this time by an NBA-record 20 games ahead of second-place Portland. They also set team records for field-goal percentage (.545) and assists (2,575). For the ninth time, they faced the Celtics in the finals. The championship series got off to a disastrous start for the Lakers, losing Game 1 of the Finals by a lopsided score of 148–114, in what is now remembered as the "Memorial Day Massacre". But the Lakers were resilient and behind 38-year-old Finals MVP Abdul-Jabbar, they were finally able to topple Boston in six games. Abdul-Jabbar proceeded to dismember the Celtics with his deadly skyhook move, and Los Angeles won Game 6 111–100 in Boston Garden, one of the greatest triumphs in franchise history. The Lakers gained their first-ever Finals victory over the Celtics, and they were the only visiting team to ever do this in Boston Garden.

The Lakers were expected to meet Boston in the finals again the next year, and started the 1985–86 season on a tear, going 24–3. They finished with 62 wins and topped the record they set the year before by winning their fifth-straight division title by 22 games. However, the Houston Rockets had their own plans for the playoffs. Hakeem Olajuwon and Ralph Sampson overwhelmed Kareem Abdul-Jabbar and the Rockets won the series when Sampson hit a 12-foot back-to-the-basket jumper as time expired in Game 5 at The Forum.

Concerned over Abdul-Jabbar's age (he was now 39), Pat Riley re-centered the offense around Magic Johnson. The strategy worked, and the Lakers accumulated 65 wins, the second-most in franchise history up to that point. Johnson also won his first MVP award. Although the Showtime Lakers were famous for their scoring, they were also a great defensive team. Michael Cooper won the NBA Defensive Player of the Year Award in 1987. After passing the Nuggets, Warriors, and SuperSonics in the playoffs, the Lakers headed to the Finals for the sixth time since 1980. Johnson then notched his last Finals MVP award as the Lakers defeated their arch-rival Celtics in the finals, highlighted by Johnson's running "baby hook" shot to win Game 4 at Boston Garden with two seconds remaining. This time, the decisive game was at home, giving the Los Angeles fans their first-ever chance to witness in person their team conquer the hated Celtics. The 40-year-old Kareem Abdul-Jabbar still managed to deliver a punch in the Finals as he and Magic Johnson rolled over Boston. The Finals proved easier than expected because Los Angeles was well-rested after an easy trip through the playoffs while their opponent was tired and battered by injuries after a brutal seven-game ECF battle with Detroit.

At the victory celebration afterward, Riley boldly guaranteed that the Lakers would repeat as champions the next year, something no team had done since the Celtics in 1969. Abdul-Jabbar also stated that he would return for the 1987–88 season to contribute to Riley's promise of back-to-back titles. With every team in the league now gunning for them, the Lakers still found a way to win, taking their seventh consecutive Pacific Division title, and subsequently meeting Isiah Thomas and the physical Detroit Pistons in the 1988 NBA Finals, even after going the distance against the Utah Jazz and the Dallas Mavericks in the second round and Conference Finals, respectively. The series went to seven games and the Lakers squeaked out a victory because of an injury to Isiah Thomas as well as James Worthy's Game 7 triple double, which earned him a Finals MVP award and cemented his nickname of "Big Game James". By the narrowest of margins, the Lakers had delivered on Riley's guarantee. With age quickly catching up to Kareem Abdul-Jabbar, Johnson had to carry the offense. It worked, and as the latter said afterward "We kept coming back. This was the hardest championship of them all."

It did not look to be the beginning of the end, as the 1988–89 Lakers won their division yet again and Magic Johnson collected his second MVP award. The team then swept their first three playoff series (against the Trail Blazers, SuperSonics, and Suns respectively) to set up a rematch with the Pistons in the Finals. But the "three-peat" was not to be, as Johnson and Byron Scott were taken out of commission by hamstring injuries. Kareem Abdul-Jabbar once again had to lead the offense, but the Pistons proved more than he could handle. In Game 4, the 42-year-old center made a bank shot at 1:42 seconds for the final two points of his career. As he walked off the floor for the last time, everyone in the Forum, including the Pistons bench, stood up and applauded.

The Lakers seemed to adapt well to Kareem's absence. New center Vlade Divac helped the team to a 63-win season in 1989–90 and their ninth consecutive division title, and Johnson took another MVP award. However, the Phoenix Suns had the Lakers' number that year in the second round of the NBA Playoffs, defeating the Lakers in a surprisingly easy five games. Pat Riley stepped down as coach and was replaced by Mike Dunleavy as head coach. Michael Cooper, another great from the Showtime years, also retired.

Johnson became the NBA's all-time assist leader, surpassing Oscar Robertson the next season, as Dunleavy's new philosophy incorporated a slow and deliberate style, instead of the fast-breaking Showtime style of the Pat Riley era. After a slow start the Lakers finished with a 58–24 record, defeated the strong Portland Trail Blazers 4–2 for the conference championship, and returned to the NBA Finals. Unfortunately for the Lakers, though, a new dynasty was just beginning elsewhere, as Michael Jordan and the Chicago Bulls under second-year coach Phil Jackson won the first of their six championships by ousting the Lakers in a 4–1 series.

== 1991–1996: Lean years ==
In October 1991, the Lakers participated in the McDonald's Open in Paris, France, with Magic Johnson being name to the tournament MVP after helping the Lakers win gold. However, on November 7, 1991, Johnson made the shocking announcement that he had been diagnosed with the HIV virus and was thus retiring from the NBA at the age of 32.

The 1991–92 Lakers struggled with the news of Magic's retirement and serious injuries to key players. They did manage to win 43 games and qualify for the playoffs for a then-NBA-record 16th consecutive time, thanks in no small way to the offseason recruitment of guard Sedale Threatt. However, playing without the injured James Worthy and Sam Perkins, the Lakers were overmatched by a powerful Portland Trail Blazers team and lost the first-round series three games to one. That series featured one of the Lakers' "home" games being played in Las Vegas due to the 1992 Los Angeles riots.

Dunleavy decided to leave the Lakers before the 1992–93 season to take charge of the Milwaukee Bucks organization. Long-time Laker assistant coach Randy Pfund was promoted to replace him. The 1992–93 Lakers fought off an early injury to guard Byron Scott and posted a respectable 33–29 record over the first 61 games. The Lakers then traded Sam Perkins to the Seattle SuperSonics for Benoit Benjamin and the rights to rookie Doug Christie. The trade upset an already fragile team as they closed the season with a poor 6–14 run, but did manage to qualify for the playoffs. The Lakers surprised the basketball world by winning the first two games of the series against the powerful Phoenix Suns on the road, including a 35-point performance by Sedale Threatt in Game 1. However the Lakers lost the final three games of the series, including an overtime thriller on the road in the fifth and final game, with Phoenix prevailing over the Lakers three games to two.

Vlade Divac and draft pick Nick Van Exel led the team in scoring the next year, but it was rough going. After losing veteran players Byron Scott and A.C. Green to free agency and with James Worthy in the final season of his career, the team posted a 33–49 record and failed to qualify for the playoffs for the first time in 17 years. The Lakers did make a late playoff push when Pfund was fired and Magic Johnson took over as head coach. Unfortunately for Laker fans, Johnson went on to lose the final ten games of the season, which is to date the worst losing streak in franchise history. Realizing that he was not cut out for coaching, Johnson stepped aside and the Lakers appointed Del Harris as their head coach going into the 1994–1995 season.

The Lakers were one of the most improved teams in 1994–95, posting a 48–34 record and returning to the playoffs after a one-year absence. The vast improvement was due to several reasons, including the coaching of Harris, the improved play of second year guard Nick Van Exel, the maturing of veteran players Vlade Divac and Elden Campbell, and the offseason signing of Cedric Ceballos and drafting of rookie Eddie Jones. Ceballos went on to record the first 50-point game by a Laker player in over 20 years. The Lakers won their first playoff series in the post-Magic era, beating the talented Seattle SuperSonics three games to one before losing to the Western Conference's number one seed San Antonio Spurs four games to two. Harris was named Coach of the Year and Jerry West won the NBA Executive of the Year Award.

The Lakers brought back essentially the same team in 1995–96 and had posted a 24–18 record after 42 games. On January 30, 1996 Magic Johnson returned to the Lakers as a reserve power forward and registered 19 points, 10 assists and 8 rebounds in his first game back against the Golden State Warriors. Johnson played well in the first few weeks of his return and sparked the Lakers to a 29–11 record while he was back in uniform. However, as the season progressed, the wheels began to fall off as Johnson's age and time away from the game began to affect his performance. Team captain Cedric Ceballos was suspended by the team, Nick Van Exel was suspended for seven games for shoving a referee, and Johnson even lost his cool, getting ejected from a late-season game for bumping an official. The imploding Lakers lost in the first round of the playoffs to the defending champion Houston Rockets three games to one. Magic Johnson retired again following the season.

== 1996–2004: O'Neal and Bryant dynasty ==
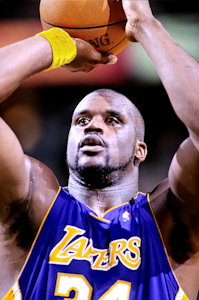
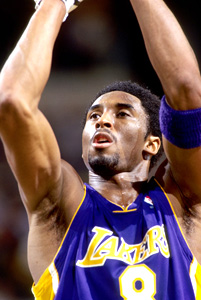
Future hall-of-famers Shaquille O'Neal (left), and Kobe Bryant (right), would help the Lakers to win three NBA titles in a row. Though they played well together on the court, the pair had an acrimonious relationship at times in the locker room later on.

During the 1996 season, the Lakers acquired 17-year-old Kobe Bryant from the Charlotte Hornets for Vlade Divac; Bryant was drafted 13th overall out of Lower Merion High School in Ardmore, Pennsylvania in that year's draft, by Charlotte. Los Angeles also signed free-agent and former Magic Center Shaquille O'Neal. Trading for Bryant was West's idea, and he was influential in the team's signing of the all-star center. "Jerry West is the reason I came to the Lakers", O'Neal later said. They used their 24th pick in the draft to select Derek Fisher. During the 1996–97 season, the team traded Cedric Ceballos to Phoenix for Robert Horry. O'Neal led the team to a 56–26 record, their best effort since 1990–91, despite missing 31 games due to a knee injury. O'Neal averaged 26.2 ppg and 12.5 rpg and finished third in the league in blocked shots (2.88 bpg) in 51 games. The Lakers defeated the Portland Trail Blazers in the first round of the 1997 NBA Playoffs. O'Neal scored 46 points in Game 1 against the Trail Blazers, marking the highest single-game playoff scoring output by a Laker since Jerry West scored 53 against the Celtics in 1969. Despite an NBA-record 7-for-7 three-point shooting performance from Horry in game 2, the Lakers lost the next round four games to one to the Utah Jazz.

In the following 1997–98 season, the Lakers were the only team without a player over the age of 30 and were joined by Rick Fox from the Boston Celtics. They started with the best start in franchise history, 11–0. Los Angeles battled Seattle for the Pacific Division title most of the season. In the final two months, the Lakers won 22 of their final 25 games, finishing 61–21, and passing Seattle in the standings. O'Neal – although missing 20 games due to an abdominal injury – was dominant, finishing only second to Michael Jordan in scoring, and leading the league in field-goal percentage (.584). The Lakers defeated Portland three games to one in the first round of the playoffs. The following round, Seattle took a one-game lead, with the Lakers responding with four straight wins, taking the series. They were swept again by the Jazz in the Conference Finals.

During the lockout-shortened 1998–99 season, All-Star guard Eddie Jones and center Elden Campbell were traded to the Charlotte Hornets to acquire all-star Glen Rice. Nick Van Exel was traded to the Denver Nuggets, and the flamboyant Dennis Rodman from the Chicago Bulls joined the team, though he was cut after just 23 games. The team also acquired J. R. Reid, and B. J. Armstrong. Harris was fired in February after a three-game losing streak and replaced on an interim basis by former Laker Kurt Rambis. The team finished 31–19 in the shortened season, which was fourth in the Western Conference. Los Angeles defeated Houston 3–1 in the first round of the playoffs, but were swept by San Antonio in the next round with game 4 being the last game ever played at the Great Western Forum.

The 1999–2000 season brought upon four huge changes: a new home floor at Staples Center (which they shared with the city rival Los Angeles Clippers), newer, more modern jerseys replacing the ones worn by the Lakers since the late 70's, a new coach in Phil Jackson, and a new system: the triangle offense. The team also acquired new players such as Ron Harper, John Salley and the returning A.C. Green. The new philosophy proved to be potent, as the Lakers started strong, winning 31 of their first 36 games. They also were able to string together winning streaks of 16, 19, and 11 games, becoming only the third team in NBA history to have three double-digit streaks in one season.

Despite topping the league with a 67–15 record in the regular season, the Lakers found themselves struggling in the playoffs, needing all five games to knock off the Sacramento Kings and coming back from 15 points down in the fourth quarter of Game 7 of the Western Conference Finals against Portland. The Indiana Pacers, coached by the Lakers' old nemesis, Larry Bird, proved to be slightly less of a problem, however, and in six games, the Lakers claimed their first NBA championship since 1988. Shaquille O'Neal picked up both MVP and Finals MVP awards in 2000. Having also shared the 2000 All-Star Game MVP award, he was only the third player in NBA history to win all three awards in the same season. Kobe Bryant was named to the NBA All-Defensive Team, the youngest player to earn the honor. Bryant had blossomed under Coach Jackson, as had Lakers role players such as Derek Fisher, Rick Fox and Robert Horry.

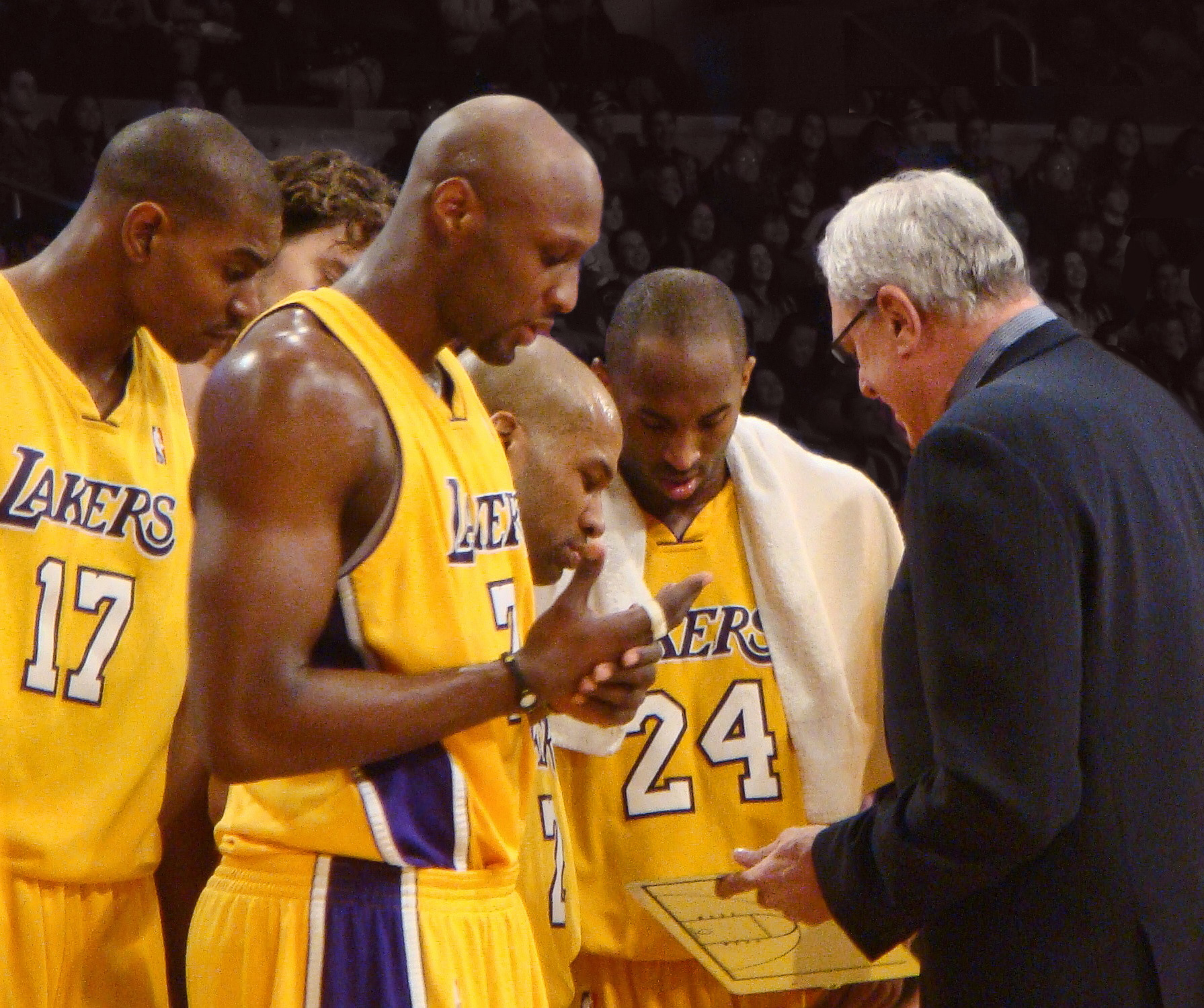
Phil Jackson coached the Lakers to five championships, all with Kobe Bryant, three with Shaquille O'Neal and two with Pau Gasol.

The Lakers certainly looked the favorite to repeat the following year, but they had a tougher time of it, accumulating 16 losses by the All-Star break, one more than they had had the entire season before. Nevertheless, they pulled together and were able to edge Sacramento for the division title. Then the team went on a tear, sweeping the first three playoff series. The Lakers-Spurs series in the conference finals was the most lopsided conference finals series in NBA History, with the Lakers winning by an average of 22 points per game. The Lakers lost the first game of the NBA Finals to Philadelphia, but that only proved to be a temporary blip, as they swept the next four games to claim their second consecutive championship. O'Neal collected his second Finals MVP and Derek Fisher set a playoff record with 15 three-pointers in the series against San Antonio. The Lakers concluded the 2001 playoffs with a staggering 15–1 record, the best single-season playoff record in NBA history; this will later be surpassed in 2017 by the Golden State Warriors when they finished the playoffs 16–1.

The Lakers started strongly in the 2001–2002 season, winning 16 of their first 17, but an arthritic toe hobbled O'Neal for much of the season and the Lakers lost the division crown to the Sacramento Kings. Thus began a memorable post-season for Robert Horry, who sealed the first series against Portland with a game-winning three-pointer, enabling the Lakers to sweep. The Lakers followed with a 4–1 defeat of San Antonio in the second round. In the Western Conference Finals, the Lakers faced the immensely talented Sacramento Kings, a team many believed was ready to finally make it over the hump and get to the NBA Finals. The series, which will most likely go down as one of the most exciting Conference Finals in NBA history, was neck and neck throughout. The Kings were only seconds away from taking a commanding 3–1 series lead in Game 4 in Los Angeles before a 3-pointer at the buzzer by Robert Horry saved the Lakers, tied the series at 2–2, and enabled the Lakers to push the series to a seventh and deciding game in Sacramento. Game 7 proved to be as dramatic as the previous games in the series, with the Lakers eventually defeating the Kings in overtime and advancing to the NBA Finals.

The championship series against the New Jersey Nets was a mere formality, as the Lakers swept all four games in one of the most lopsided NBA Finals ever. By securing their third straight NBA Championship, the Lakers of 2000–2002 earned their place in NBA history. O'Neal won his third consecutive Finals MVP award joining only Michael Jordan as players to have achieved such honors, and Jackson won his ninth championship as a head coach, tying Celtics legend Red Auerbach, while surpassing Pat Riley as the coach with the most playoff victories.

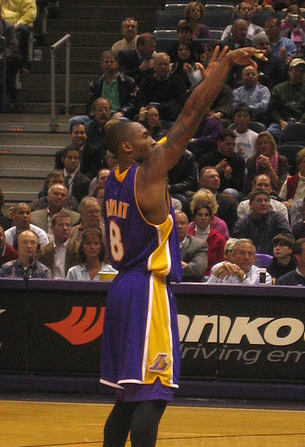
Kobe Bryant won two Finals MVP trophies with the Lakers in 2009 and 2010.

The Laker juggernaut seemed unstoppable, and a fourth consecutive championship was in their sights. However, they started off poorly, with Shaquille O'Neal missing the first 12 games while recovering from toe surgery, and then taking time to get into game shape. At Christmas, the team was 11–19, but then Kobe Bryant turned in the best-sustained performance of his career, setting NBA records for the youngest player to reach 10,000 points, most three-pointers in a game (12), most three-pointers in a half (8), and most consecutive three-pointers in a game (9). Additionally, he set a team record for most points in a half (42), scored 40+ points in 9 consecutive games (joining Chamberlain and Jordan), scored 35+ points in 13 consecutive games (trailing only Chamberlain), became the third player to average 40 points in a month, and became the first Laker to record a triple-double in consecutive games since Magic Johnson in 1991.

The Lakers concluded the season with a 50–32 record, marking their 27th winning season since the franchise relocated to Los Angeles. Entering the series tied at two games each, the team played without tri-captain Rick Fox, who was sidelined due to a foot injury sustained during the previous series against Minnesota.

Although San Antonio established a 25-point lead, the Lakers reduced the deficit in the fourth quarter. Trailing by 18 points entering the final period, Los Angeles narrowed the margin to two points with 14.7 seconds remaining. On the final possession, with 3.6 seconds on the clock, Robert Horry attempted a potential game-winning three-pointer; however, the shot circled the rim and failed to convert, resulting in a loss.

Rather than rejoicing in another last-second victory that would have given them a 3–2 series lead and a chance to finish the Spurs off back home in Los Angeles, the Lakers instead faced the dejection of having been so close, but now facing a 3–2 deficit and now being on the brink of elimination. The Spurs did not waste their chance to finish off the Lakers. They swarmed the Lakers in Game 6 and put an end to the Lakers' dreams of a fourth consecutive NBA championship.

Determined to reclaim the title in Dr. Buss' 25th year of ownership, the Lakers brought in free agents Karl Malone and Gary Payton, and started the 2003–04 season with a bang, winning 20 of their first 25 games, during which time Malone became the oldest player to record a triple-double. But then Malone went down with a knee injury, and other ailments to Shaquille O'Neal and Kobe Bryant soon followed, leaving Payton to lead the younger players in an offensive system with which he was not particularly familiar. Additionally, the team faced the ongoing distraction of Bryant's sexual assault case and the sniping between O'Neal and Bryant which had ensued after Bryant was charged.

Still, the team managed to keep things together for everyone to recover, closing the season in style with 14 victories in 17 games, and a Pacific Division title thanks to Bryant's two buzzer-beating three-pointers against Portland: one to tie the game at the end of regulation, and the second to win it in double-overtime. Without Horry in the playoffs, it was up to Fisher to save the team with a game-winning buzzer-beater. Again the Lakers were down 0–2 to San Antonio (at this time, the defending champions) in the semifinals. Again they were able to tie the series two games a piece at home. Again they were down as Game 5 drew to a close. Fisher's basket, coming off of an inbounds play that began with just 0.4 seconds left in the game, would achieve acclaim as one of the NBA's most memorable playoff moments. This time, the Lakers returned home for Game 6 relishing their improbable win, and they took advantage of their chance to finish off the Spurs, taking the game to advance to the Western Conference Finals.

After storming through the number one seed Minnesota Timberwolves in the Western Conference Finals, the Lakers were expected to run roughshod over their NBA Finals opponents, the Detroit Pistons. But it wound up being the other way around, with the Pistons winning the series easily in five games, playing a team-oriented game featuring a particularly stingy defense.

== 2004–2016: The Kobe Bryant era ==
=== 2004–2007: Self-destruction and rebuilding ===
The following summer after the 2003–04 season, the Lakers made many changes. Jackson was burned out, and the Lakers' management was unwilling to raise his salary from $6 million a year to $12 million which he wanted to continue. Also, assistant coach Tex Winter said Jackson announced at the 2004 All-Star break that he would not want to return to the Lakers if Bryant returned. The long-simmering tensions between Shaquille O'Neal and Kobe Bryant finally came to a head. When Jackson was not retained as coach (a move many believed to have been orchestrated by Bryant), O'Neal demanded a trade and it was granted; he went to the Miami Heat in return for Lamar Odom, Caron Butler, and Brian Grant. Bryant tested the free-agent market, before deciding to stay with the Lakers. Jackson retired to his ranch in Montana and Rudy Tomjanovich came in as the new head coach.

Gary Payton was dealt to Boston and Karl Malone retired after undergoing knee surgery, but not before the possibility of his return was eliminated when he and Bryant had a falling-out. Despite all of the offseason movement, the Lakers did manage a 24–19 start at the beginning of the 2004–05 season, but it was at this time that Tomjanovich left the team for health concerns. The Lakers struggled without Tomjanovich but were still able to manage a 32–29 record and were in position to make the playoffs. However, the Lakers were not able to overcome late-season injuries to Bryant and Odom, and went on to lose 19 of their last 21 games, finishing with a record of 34–48. With that record, the Lakers missed the playoffs for the first time in 11 years and this was the fifth time in franchise history to do so.

Despite all of this, Bryant continued to set records, including becoming the youngest player to reach 14,000 points and setting a franchise record with 43 consecutive made free throws. The team also made 100% of their free throws three times, the first time since 1991–92. But all of that amounted to little, as the Lakers ended the season below .500 and missed the playoffs.

The 2005–06 season would see the Lakers reunite with Phil Jackson. Jackson's year off, including vacationing in Australia, left him rejuvenated, whereas the Lakers' struggle in 2004–05 caused Jerry Buss to reconsider his willingness to meet Jackson's salary demands.

In the off-season, the Lakers' most significant player personnel moves had been acquiring forward Kwame Brown from Washington in exchange for Caron Butler and Chucky Atkins, and drafting center Andrew Bynum straight from high school.

After the previous season's poor showing, most felt that simply making the playoffs would be an accomplishment. The new Laker team seemed somewhat modeled after Jackson's 1990s Chicago Bulls dynasty which had garnered 6 championships. Lamar Odom, a gifted facilitator forward, was also seen by some to be a "Scottie Pippen" type of player to complement Kobe Bryant's talents.

After a shaky start, the team's chemistry appeared to improve dramatically during the latter half of the season. The Lakers managed to put forth more consistent efforts as the regular season drew to a close. The team's late-season surge was enough to secure a playoff berth and allay some of their fans' immediate concerns about the team. They played the second-seeded Phoenix Suns, and after Bryant hit two clutch shots to win Game 4 at Los Angeles, they appeared to be en route to an upset with a 3–1 series lead, which would set up a "Hallway Series" in the second round against the Los Angeles Clippers, who had already advanced by ousting the Denver Nuggets. However, Phoenix, led by 2006 MVP Steve Nash, was able to rally. They would win at home 114–97 in Game 5, win at Los Angeles 126–118 in overtime of Game 6 (almost losing in regulation), and blow out in Game 7 121–90 at Phoenix.

The Lakers trailed 60–45 at halftime of Game 7. Bryant had 23 points at halftime but would score only one point on three shots in the second half. Several critics, such as Bill Simmons suggested that Bryant, with his team trailing by so much, should have attempted more shots in the second half; some, such as Charles Barkley even suggested that Bryant refused to shoot to "prove a point" about the inferior scoring ability of his teammates. Bryant and coach Phil Jackson denied this, with both stating that Kobe was following the halftime game plan by getting others involved.

During the 2006 off-season, the Lakers drafted UCLA point guard Jordan Farmar. To the surprise of many fans, the Lakers started the season strongly with key victories over teams like the Utah Jazz, Dallas Mavericks, and San Antonio Spurs. However, things started going downhill after a slew of injuries to Lamar Odom, Kwame Brown, and Luke Walton. Kobe Bryant was suspended twice for striking opponents.

Following the 2006–07 season the future of Kobe Bryant's career as a Laker fell into doubt when he demanded to be traded. For a week he tiraded and the situation escalated when a videotape about him was released. The video recorded him saying that the Lakers should have traded Andrew Bynum for Jason Kidd. Bryant insulted Bynum and was critical of the general manager Mitch Kupchak. Roster management decided to resign Derek Fisher, a past hero, but the Lakers would enter the season frustrated and with question marks.

=== 2007–2014: Bryant and Gasol years ===
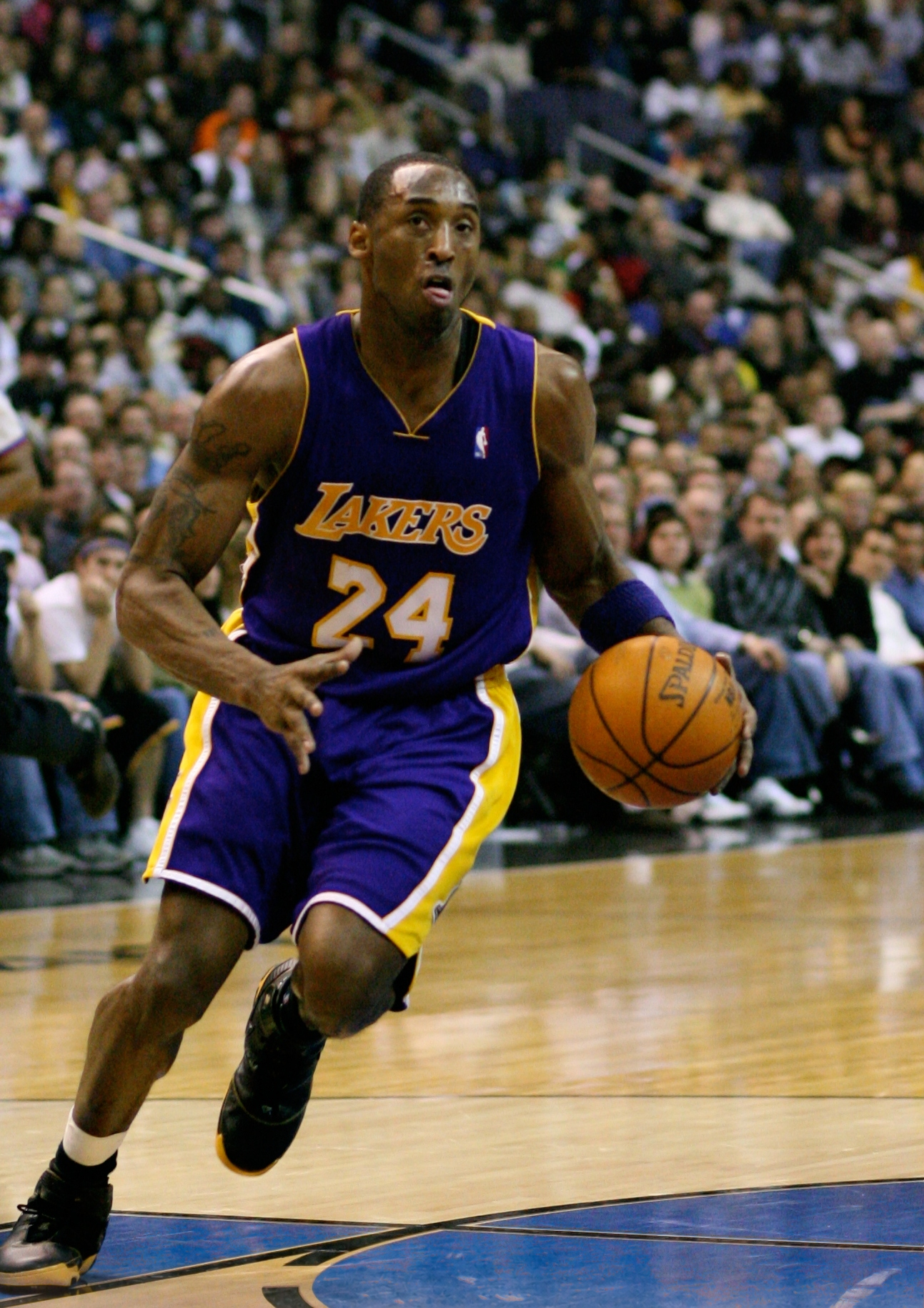
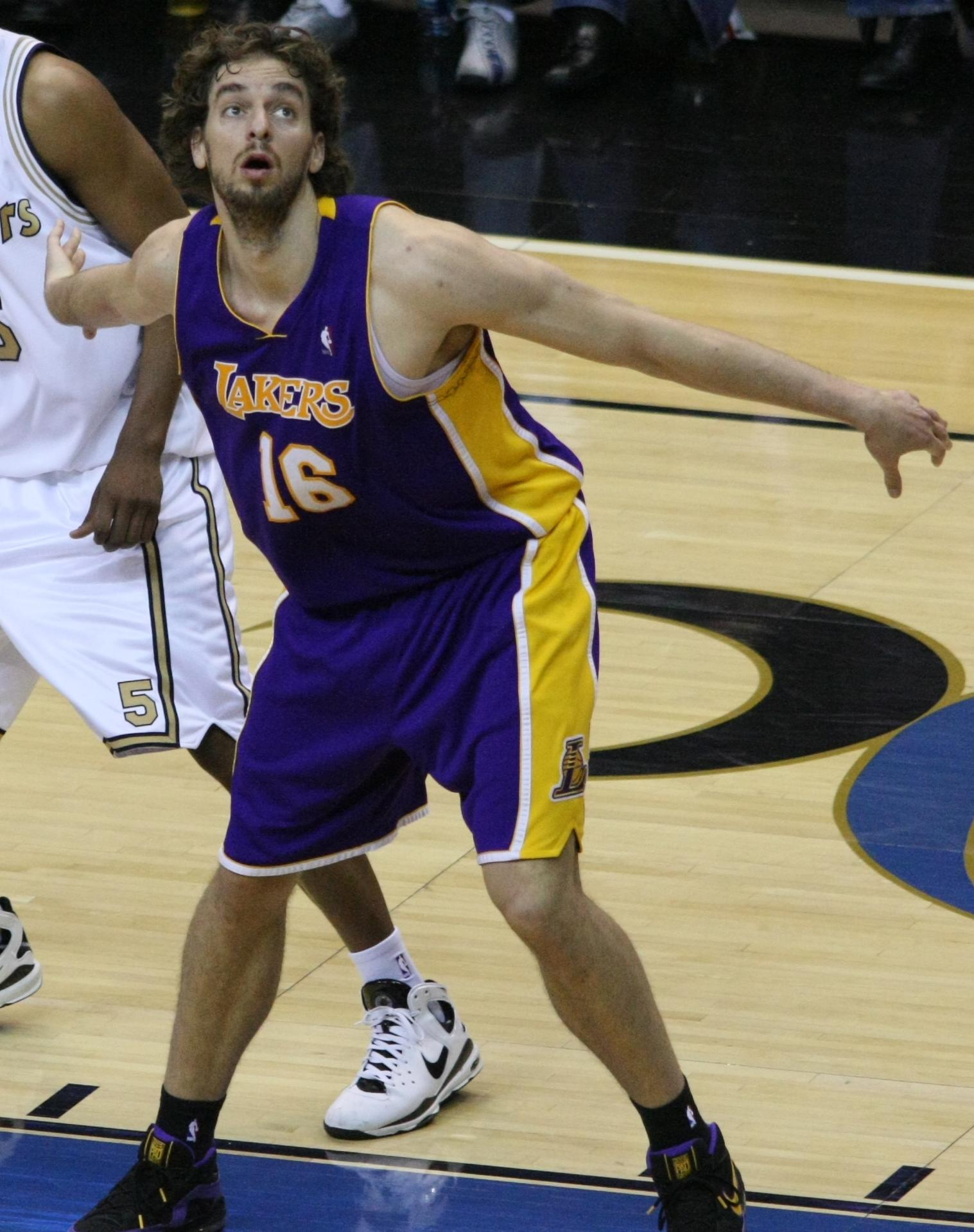
Kobe Bryant (left), and Pau Gasol (right), would help the Lakers reach the NBA Finals three consecutive seasons and win 2 of those NBA Finals back-to-back.

The Lakers started the 2007–08 season surprisingly well. Fueled by the emergence of Andrew Bynum as a main option at center, the Lakers would even enjoy being the number-one team in the Western Conference for three days. Capped by an early season trade for Trevor Ariza, rumors of Bryant wanting to leave Los Angeles were finally beginning to die. However, before the Lakers could savor their new success, Bynum would go down with a knee injury that would take him out for the remainder of the season. Suddenly, the contending Lakers would lose three straight games. The remainder of the season looked bleak for the Lakers, who were struggling to win games. It seemed that injuries, once again, would cripple another Laker season.

On February 1, 2008, the Lakers dealt the unpopular Kwame Brown, rookie Javaris Crittenton, veteran Aaron McKie, the draft rights to Marc Gasol, and first-round picks in 2008 and 2010 for Spaniard all-star forward Pau Gasol (Marc's older brother) and a second-round draft choice in 2010.

Even while waiting for Bynum's return, the Lakers were playing well and moved up to second in the Western Conference.

With Kobe Bryant leading the charge with his MVP-caliber season, the month of April was very triumphant for the Lakers, who quickly surged to the top of the Western Conference. Aided by Gasol's versatile abilities and Lamar Odom's stellar play as a third option, the Lakers clinched their playoff berth for the 55th time in their 60 years with the league, won the Pacific Division from the Phoenix Suns (their first since Shaq left in 2004), and clinched the number one seed in the Western Conference for the first time since the 1999–2000 season. Bryant was also named the 2007–2008 NBA Most Valuable Player. Entering the post-season, the Lakers would post a 12–3 record entering the Finals. However, problems suddenly arose when the Lakers faced the Boston Celtics in the 2008 NBA Finals. The Celtics, the best-record team during the regular season, convincingly beat the Lakers 4–2 in the best-of-7 series.

In the 2009 season, the Lakers had only one goal in mind: "ring," their huddle chant. In January, they would again lose Andrew Bynum to injury. He would return for the last few regular season games, and the Lakers ended up with a record of 65–17. In the playoffs, Los Angeles easily beat the Utah Jazz but then faced a tough Houston Rockets team in the second round. Though the Rockets stunned the Staples Center crowd with a Game 1 win, the Lakers took the series in seven, with most games blowouts. The Denver Nuggets kept the next round tight for L.A., until the Lakers blew out Game 6, winning a conference championship. In the Finals against the Orlando Magic, 3 games were close, but the Lakers won in 5 and were crowned NBA champions for the first time in 7 years. Kobe Bryant was named Finals MVP.

Kobe Bryant goes up for a shot against the Phoenix Suns double team. As Bryant's shot misses, Ron Artest (now named Metta Sandiford-Artest), left, gets the offensive game winning putback, Game 5 of the 2010 Western Conference Finals

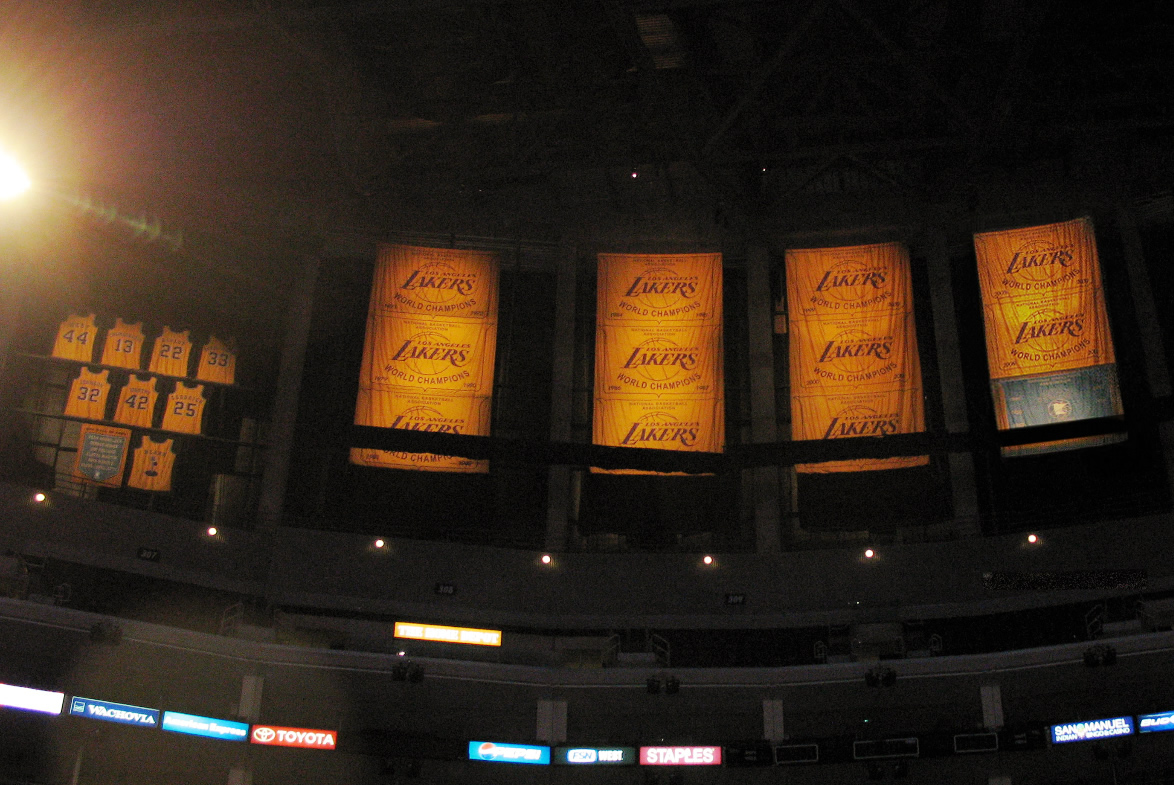
Five championship banners were added to the rafters of Staples Center during Phil Jackson's tenure with the Lakers.

On July 3, 2009, the Lakers signed Houston Rockets forward Ron Artest to a five-year contract to replace Lakers forward Trevor Ariza, who signed with the Rockets. The Lakers once again won the Western Conference and made it to a third straight finals, in which they rematched the Boston Celtics. Faced against much of the same roster they had played with in 2008, the series played out very tightly, with both teams trading wins for the first four games. After the Celtics won a decisive game 5, the series moved back to Los Angeles where the Lakers would win a rout. Coming down to the fifth game 7 in the rivalry's history, Boston played well in the early goings of the match. However, the Lakers would rally in the fourth quarter to a raging Staples Center crowd. Led by Bryant and Gasol's rebounding, and with clutch shots from Ron Artest and Derek Fisher, the Lakers would win their franchise's sixteenth NBA championship. Bryant was awarded his second consecutive Finals Most Valuable Player Award.

In the 2011 NBA playoffs, the Lakers advanced past the first round by defeating the New Orleans Hornets 4–2. However, the Dallas Mavericks swept the Lakers and ended Phil Jackson's career with a 36-point blowout in Game 4.

After Jackson's retirement, former Cleveland Cavaliers head coach Mike Brown was hired as head coach. On December 8, 2011, the New Orleans Hornets, the Los Angeles Lakers and the Houston Rockets agreed to a trade that would send Chris Paul to Los Angeles. NBA commissioner David Stern nullified the trade. The decision was met with severe backlash by players and sportswriters. The league had acquired the Hornets from former owner George Shinn, and the commissioner's office has final authority over all management decisions. Several of the other owners also opposed the deal (most notably Cleveland Cavaliers owner Dan Gilbert). Two weeks before the 2011–12 NBA season began, the Lakers traded Lamar Odom along with a 2012 2nd round draft pick to the Dallas Mavericks for a 2014 1st round draft pick. At the end of the trade deadline, the Lakers traded long time point guard Derek Fisher to Houston for Jordan Hill. During the 2012 NBA Playoffs, the Lakers nearly blew a 3–1 series lead to the Denver Nuggets, before closing them out in the seventh game. Entering the semifinals, the Lakers would lose to the Oklahoma City Thunder 4–1.

Entering the 2012–13 season, the Lakers made key changes in their roster, trading several draft picks to the Phoenix Suns for two-time MVP Steve Nash, and trading Andrew Bynum and a first-round draft pick in a four-team deal that netted them three-time defensive player of the year Dwight Howard. After a 1–4 start to the season, Brown was fired as head coach. The Lakers first contacted Jackson to replace Brown; however, talks stalled as Jackson requested time to consider the position. The next day, the team talked with Mike D'Antoni and signed him to a multi-year contract in a unanimous decision by the front office. They felt that D'Antoni's fast-paced style of play made him a "great fit" for the team, more suitable than Jackson's structured triangle offense. Jerry Buss' preference has always been for the Lakers to have a wide-open offense. D'Antoni was reunited with Nash, who won two MVPs in four season under D'Antoni while with the Suns. Bryant was also familiar with D'Antoni; Bryant as a child knew him when D'Antoni was a star in Italy and Bryant's father was also playing there. Bryant grew close with D'Antoni during their time with the United States national team.

D'Antoni's coaching debut with the Lakers was delayed as he recovered from knee replacement surgery he had weeks earlier. Bernie Bickerstaff, who was the Lakers' interim coach after Brown was fired, continued in that role after D'Antoni was hired. He was 4–1 as the interim coach, winning his last two as D'Antoni started leading team practices. D'Antoni predicted that the Lakers, then 3–5 and ranked 20th in scoring with 96.5 points per game, should instead be scoring "110–115 points a game". He wanted to revive Showtime. On November 20, he coached his first game—nine days after he was hired—in a 95–90 win against the Brooklyn Nets. On February 18, 2013, the Lakers franchise and the sports world were saddened by the death of Dr. Jerry Buss at the age of 80. In their first game after his passing and following a speech of tribute from Kobe Bryant along with a moment of silence observed by the crowd, an emotional and inspired Lakers team defeated their archrival Celtics. Very fitting that this was the team Dr. Buss most enjoyed seeing his Lakers beat. With 10 championships and 16 finals appearances during his tenure as owner beginning in 1979 until his death, Dr. Buss was the most successful owner in the history of North American sports.

Despite all the struggles, including an injury to Kobe in a controversial March loss to Atlanta in which they were not awarded 2 free throws after Kobe's injury, while it was later admitted they should have, the Lakers made the playoffs as the 7th seed at 45–37, only clinching a playoff spot in the last game. Their first-round matchup against San Antonio was nowhere to being close as the Spurs won all four games easily. In the 2013–14 season, the Lakers started 10–9 before finishing 27–55 and missing the playoffs for just the sixth time since moving to Los Angeles.

=== 2014–2016: Bryant's final years ===
The Lakers won the rights to the seventh pick of the 2014 NBA draft with which they selected Julius Randle, a freshman power forward from the University of Kentucky. The Washington Wizards agreed to sell the Lakers the rights to the 46th pick of the draft for cash considerations. The Lakers drafted Jordan Clarkson with the 46th pick of the draft and agreed terms for a two-year deal.

After the Lakers missed the 2014 NBA playoffs, Pau Gasol signed with the Chicago Bulls as a free agent for a three-year $22 million deal during the 2014 off-season.

The Lakers finished their 2014–15 season with a record of 21–61, missing the playoffs, and earning the worst record in franchise history. The Lakers obtained the second pick of the 2015 NBA draft at the 2015 NBA Draft Lottery where they drafted Ohio State University freshman point guard D'Angelo Russell. They also drafted Larry Nance Jr. with the 27th pick and Anthony Brown with the 34th pick of the 2015 NBA draft.

Early in the 2015–16 season, Bryant announced he would retire at the end of the season. In Bryant's final game, he gave the Lakers one more 60-point game in a 101–96 victory over the Utah Jazz. The Lakers were eliminated from playoff contention for the third straight season, the ninth time total since moving to Los Angeles, and a new team record for worst finish at 17–65. It was the first postseason drought for the Lakers to surpass two straight misses since the 1974–75 and 1975–76 seasons. With 20 seasons, Bryant has spent the longest career with a single team, a distinction now held by Dallas Mavericks legend Dirk Nowitzki.

== 2016–2018: Post-Bryant era ==
On April 24, 2016, the Lakers announced they had fired coach Byron Scott. He was replaced by Warriors assistant and former Lakers forward Luke Walton. Soon thereafter, the Lakers won the second overall pick in the 2016 NBA draft and selected Brandon Ingram, a 6'9" freshman small forward from Duke University.

On February 21, 2017, the Lakers fired general manager Mitch Kupchak, while Magic Johnson was named as the president of basketball operations. The team's governor Jeanie Buss, also announced the removal of her brother, Jim Buss, from his position as executive vice president of basketball operations. On March 7, 2017, the Lakers hired Rob Pelinka as the general manager.

In the 2017 NBA draft the Lakers had the second overall pick yet again, and selected Lonzo Ball, a 6'6" freshman point guard from UCLA. In a draft-day trade, the Lakers also acquired Brook Lopez and 27th overall selection Kyle Kuzma from the Brooklyn Nets in exchange for Russell and Timofey Mozgov. The 2017–18 season saw another improvement with a 35–47 record, nine more wins than the previous season. In addition, Jordan Clarkson and Larry Nance Jr. were traded to the Cleveland Cavaliers in exchange for Isaiah Thomas, Channing Frye and the 25th overall selection in the 2018 NBA draft. That draft pick was used to select center Moritz Wagner from Michigan during the 2018 NBA draft.

== 2018–2025: The LeBron James era ==
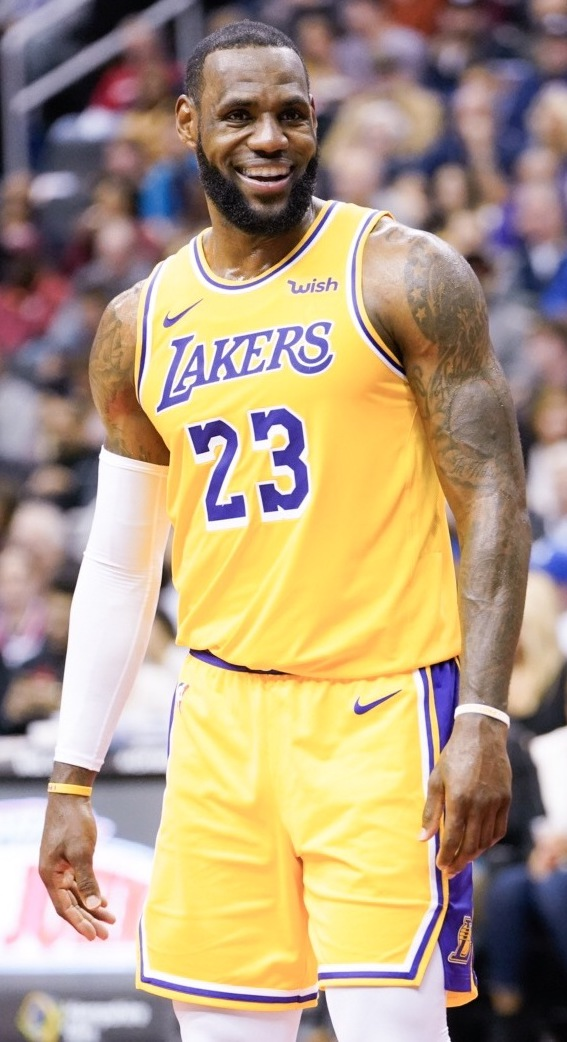
LeBron James signed with the Lakers in 2018. He led the team to its 17th title in 2020 and was named the Finals MVP.

July 9, 2018, the Lakers signed LeBron James to a 4-year, $154 million contract. The Lakers sustained several injuries during the 2018–19 season, and did not qualify for the playoffs for the sixth consecutive season. On April 9, 2019, Magic Johnson stepped down as the president of basketball operations, while the Lakers finished the 2018–19 season with a record of 37–45. On April 12, the Lakers and Luke Walton agreed to part ways after three seasons.

=== 2019–2025: James and Davis era - Back to relevance and 17th NBA championship ===
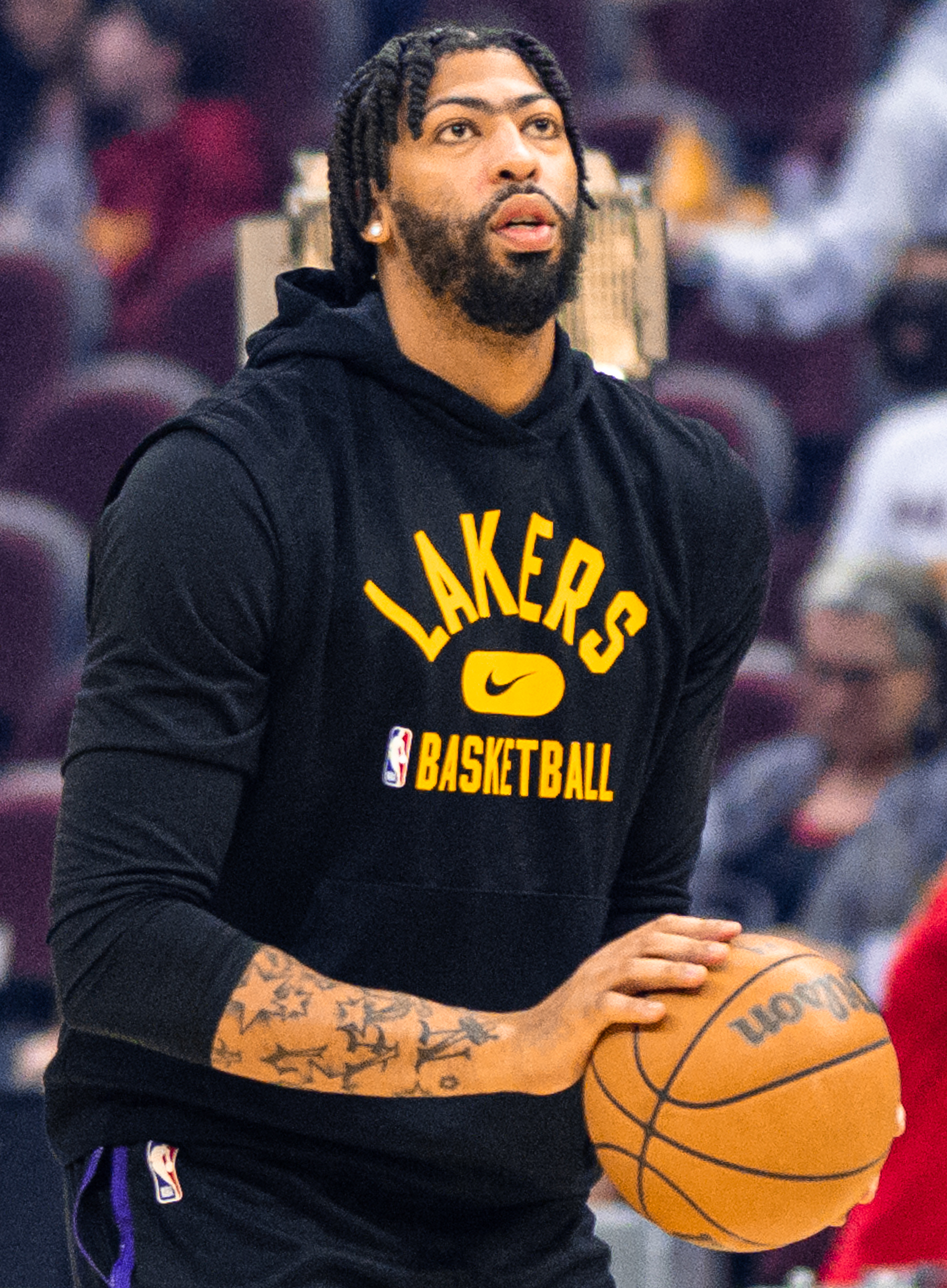
Anthony Davis was traded to the Lakers in 2019.

On May 13, the Lakers hired Frank Vogel as head coach. On July 6, the Lakers acquired Anthony Davis from the New Orleans Pelicans for Lonzo Ball, Brandon Ingram, Josh Hart, and three first-round picks, including the number four overall in the 2019 draft.

During the 2019–20 season, the Lakers made the playoffs for the first time since 2013. Leading up to this, however Kobe Bryant died on January 26. The team qualified for the 2020 NBA playoffs with a 52–19 record as the first seed in the Western Conference for the first time since 2010 and the 17th time in franchise history. Again the team would be beset with tribulations with the entire season in doubt due to the coronavirus pandemic with several NBA players testing positive. The season was resumed months later in Orlando in Disney World under special circumstances, played in the same arena without fans and few spectators, where the teams would spend months without leave (Over 3 months for the finalists).

In the first round, they faced the Portland Trail Blazers, after losing Game 1, the Lakers then eliminated the Trail Blazers by winning four straight, it was the Lakers' first series win in 8 years. The following round, the Houston Rockets took a one-game lead, with the Lakers responding with four straight wins again, taking the series and advancing to the Western Conference Finals for the first time since 2010. The Lakers then beat the Denver Nuggets 4–1 to move on to their first NBA Finals in exactly a decade. In the 2020 NBA Finals, the Lakers defeated the Miami Heat in six games to win the franchise's 17th NBA title.

The next season, with injuries to James and Davis, the Lakers dropped to a 42–30 record as the number 7 seed in the West. They were upended in the opening round against the second-seeded Phoenix Suns.

During the 2021–22 season, the Lakers finished the season with a 33–49 record, one game behind the last spot for the NBA play-in tournament. Following the season, head coach Frank Vogel was fired on April 11, 2022.

During the 2022–23 season. The Lakers started the season 0–5, the last winless team in the NBA. With a 128–117 win over the Jazz, the Lakers qualified for the Play-In-Tournament for the first time since 2021. The Lakers defeated the Minnesota Timberwolves 108–102 in overtime to return to the playoffs after a one-year absence. Additionally, the Lakers became the sixth team to advance to the playoffs after starting the season 2–10. The Lakers won 8 of their last 10 games. In the 2023 NBA playoffs, the Lakers defeated the two-seeded Memphis Grizzlies in six games despite being underdogs to win a playoff series for the first time since their championship run in 2020 and on their home court for the first time since 2012. In the conference semifinals, they defeated the defending champion Golden State Warriors also in six games, becoming the first 7th-seed to reach the Western Conference finals since the 1986–87 Seattle SuperSonics.

However, the Lakers were swept by the eventual NBA champion Denver Nuggets in the Western Conference finals in 4 straight games. This was the first time that the Nuggets have won a playoff series over Lakers in their franchise history.

After stumbling to a 3–5 start in the 2023–24 season, the Lakers won 12 of their next 16 games. The run coincided with their run in the NBA In-Season Tournament (later rebranded as the NBA Cup) where they eventually defeated the Indiana Pacers in the inaugural tournament championship game. Despite Lebron James playing his most games in a season as a Laker and Anthony Davis playing a career-high 76 games, the rest of the roster were hampered by injuries and the Lakers ranked sixth in the NBA in missed games due to injury. Following the tournament win, the Lakers stumbled again with a 4-11 stretch sending the team to the 13th place in the West. The Lakers regained their momentum from November, finishing the season with 23 wins in their last 33 games, the fifth-best record during that stretch, ending in 7th place in the west. After beating the New Orleans Pelicans in the play-in, the Lakers lost to the Nuggets in the first round, 1–4.

Following the season, the Lakers fired Darvin Ham and hired JJ Redick as the team's new head coach. A few days later, the team selected Bronny James, Lebron's oldest son, in the second round of the 2024 NBA draft.

== 2025–present: The Luka Dončić era ==
On February 1, 2025 (the 17 year anniversary of the Pau Gasol deal), the Lakers executed a shocking blockbuster trade, sending a package centered around Davis to the Dallas Mavericks in exchange for 25 year-old superstar guard Luka Dončić, pairing him with James, his childhood idol. This was considered the most shocking trade in NBA history. In July, sources reported the Buss family would be selling the majority of the Lakers to Mark Walter for $10 billion, the biggest sum ever paid for an American sports team.

On July 8, 2026, the Lakers signed Walker Kessler to a four-year, $130 million contract via a sign-and-trade with the Jazz in exchange for two first-round picks and two first-round pick swaps.

During the off-season LeBron James left the Lakers in free agency to join the Philadelphia 76ers.
