= Mimi Ajzenstadt =

Israeli criminologist (born 1956)

- מימי אייזנשטדט
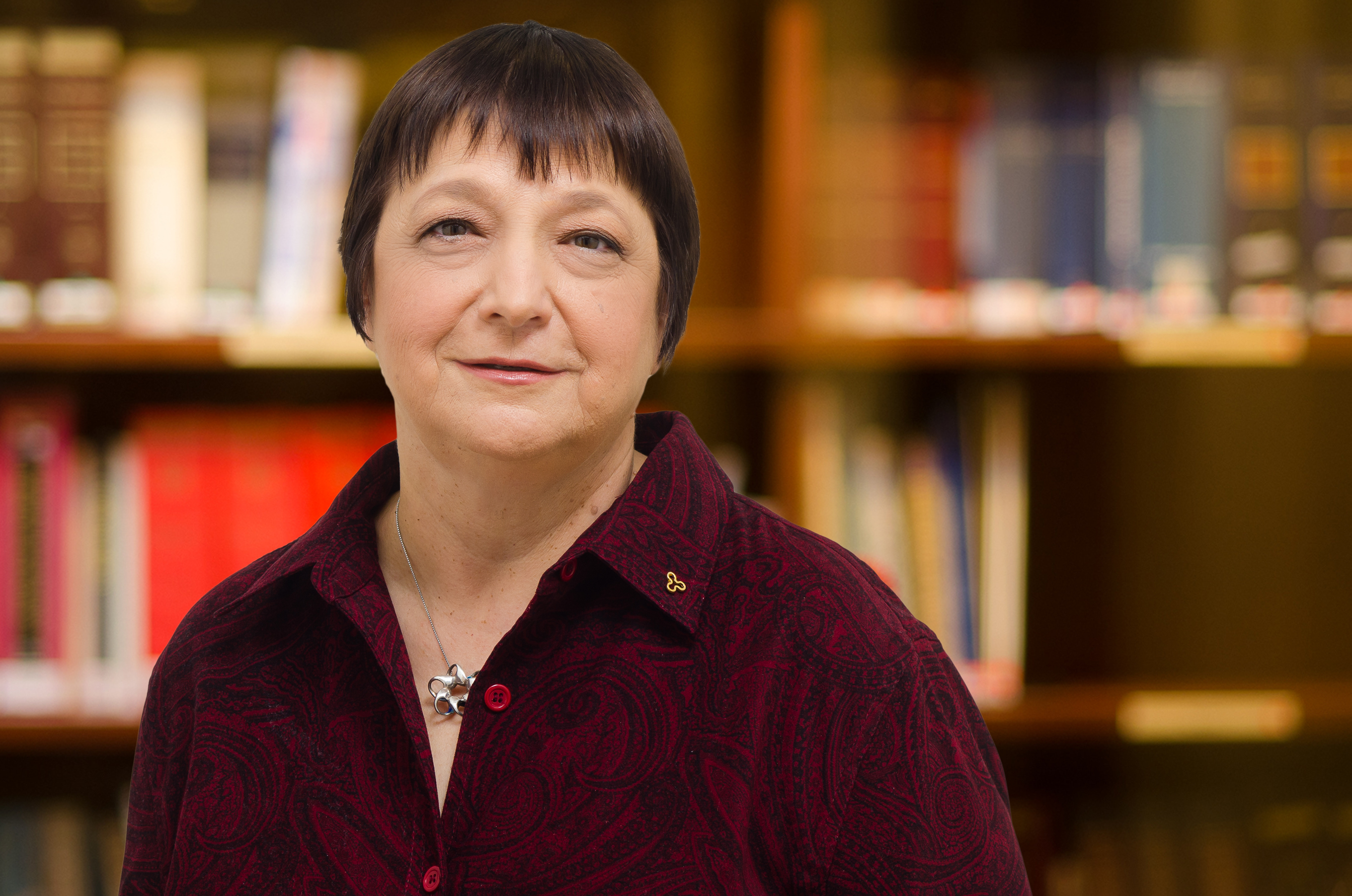
- Mimi Ajzenstadt (2018)
- Born: September 24, 1956 (age 69)
- Education: The Hebrew University of Jerusalem; Simon Fraser University
- Title: Mildred and Benjamin Berger Chair in Criminology, The Hebrew University of Jerusalem; President of the Open University of Israel

Mimi Ajzenstadt (Hebrew: מימי אייזנשטדט; born September 24, 1956) is an Israeli criminologist who was named the Mildred and Benjamin Berger Chair in Criminology at The Hebrew University of Jerusalem, and is the President of the Open University of Israel.

== Early life and education ==
Ajzenstadt earned a B.A. in Education/Arabic Language (1980), a Teaching Certificate in Arabic Language (1982), and an M.A. in Criminology (1984) from The Hebrew University of Jerusalem, a Ph.D. in Criminology from Simon Fraser University in Vancouver, Canada in 1992, and was a post-doctoral fellow at The Hebrew University of Jerusalem in 1992 to 1994, researching the sociology of law and the sociology of deviance.

== Career ==
Beginning in 1994 Ajzenstadt taught at the Hebrew University in the Institute of Criminology, the Faculty of Law, and the Paul Baerwald School of Social Work and Social Welfare, becoming a full professor in 2012 and Dean of the Paul Baerwald School of Social Work and Social Welfare in 2014. She was named the Mildred and Benjamin Berger Chair in Criminology.

She is the President of the Open University of Israel, having been elected in 2018.

Ajzenstadt was a book review editor (2003 to 2006) and a member of the Editorial Board (2003 to 2009) of the Israel Law Review.
