= List of world association football records =

This article features a list of men's professional FIFA records in association football, in any football league, cup, or other competition around the world, including professionals, semi-professionals, and amateurs unless otherwise stated. Friendly club matches are generally not eligible for the records. The article includes comprehensive statistics on official football leagues worldwide in general, without taking league rankings or coefficients into account. The statistics apply only to first teams, figures for reserve teams and youth teams are not included unless otherwise stated.

These records are divided based on whether they relate to players, coaches, clubs, or stadiums.

== Players ==
As of 20 November 2026

=== Goals records ===
==== Most goals ====
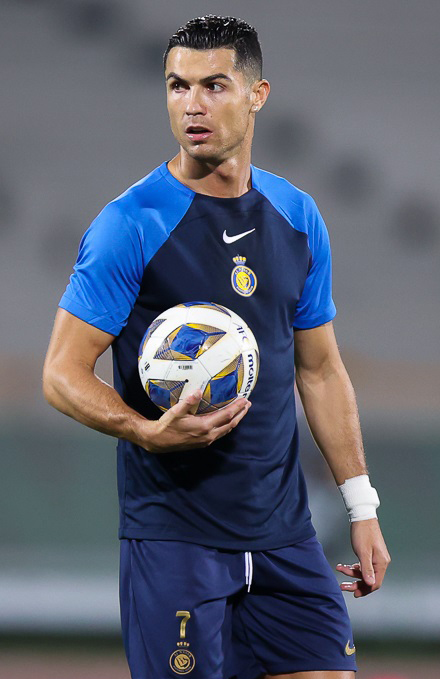
Cristiano Ronaldo, the all-time top scorer in official football history, with over 985 goals

- Most top-level goals: 986 – (Portugal) Cristiano Ronaldo, 2002–
- Most official goals: 1,004 – (Portugal) Cristiano Ronaldo, 2002–
- Most overall goals: 1,917 – (Hungary) Lajos Tichy, 1953–1971 (Note: Including friendly matches and competitions.)
- Most club goals: 840 – (Portugal) Cristiano Ronaldo, 2002– (Note: Erwin Helmchen could have scored 870 club goals.)
- Most international goals: 146 – (Portugal) Cristiano Ronaldo, 2004–2026
- Most domestic goals: 666 – (Portugal) Cristiano Ronaldo, 2002– (Note: According to other sources, Bican could be the leader with 728 goals.)
- Most domestic league goals: (Note: Including other categories than top-tier division, except regional and local leagues.) 643 – (Austria) (Czechoslovakia) Josef Bican, 1931–1957 (Note: Erwin Helmchen scored 713 goals of which 690 in German regional leagues.)
- Most domestic national league goals: 609 – (Portugal) Cristiano Ronaldo, 2002–
- Most domestic national cup goals: 97 – (Portugal) Eusébio, 1961–1974 (Note: Ian Rush scored 98 goals combined between national cup and league cup.)
- Most international club goals: 174 – (Portugal) Cristiano Ronaldo, 2002–
- Most goals scored for one club: 672 – (Argentina) Lionel Messi for Barcelona, 2004–2021 (Note: Erwin Helmchen scored at least 667 goals with PSV Chemnitz in official matches; it's very likely that due to the lack of reliable information he hasn't surpassed officially the amount Messi reached but actually he did it. Counting all matches in one club, Gerd Müller scored 1256 goals for Bayern Munich.)
- Most goals scored in one league: 474 – (Argentina) Lionel Messi in La Liga, 2004–2021
- Best goal ratio ever: 1.52 (Note: 805 goals in 530 games played.) – (Austria) (Czechoslovakia) Josef Bican, 1931–1957 (Note: According to RSSSF, Erwin Helmchen leads this category with 1.71 goals per game. Other sources mention Fernando Peyroteo with 1.77 goals per match but they only count his goals in Portuguese First Division National Championship.)

==== Most goals in a year / season ====
- In a calendar year: 91 – (Argentina) Lionel Messi, 2012 (Note: Godfrey Chitalu is claimed to have scored 109 official goals in 1972 for Kabwe Warriors and Zambia. However, the officiality of this tally is disputed. Other sources, such as FIFA, name Pelé as the best in this category with 127 goals scored in 1959, but this amount includes goals in friendly matches.)
- In a football season: 107 – (Poland) (Germany) Ernst Wilimowski, 1940–41 for PSV Chemnitz
- In a club football season: 96 (Note: This tally includes 35 goals at regional and local cups, which are in any case official competitions.) – (Northern Ireland) Fred Roberts, 1930–31 for Glentoran (Note: At top-level football, excluding regional and local competitions, the most widely recognized record is Lionel Messi's 73 goals for Barcelona during the 2011–12 season. Godfrey Chitalu is also claimed to have scored 97 official goals in the 1972 season for Kabwe Warriors. However, the officiality of this tally is disputed.)
- Most goals scored by a defender in a calendar year: 27 – (Argentina) Daniel Passarella, 1976
- Most goals scored by a goalkeeper in a calendar year: 21 – (Brazil) Rogério Ceni, 2005
- Most domestic league goals scored in a football season: 76 – (American Samoa) Johnica Collins, 2024 for Pago Youth
- Most international club goals scored in a football season: 19
  - (Democratic Republic of the Congo) Trésor Mputu, 2007 for TP Mazembe (Note: 9 goals scored in 2007 CAF Champions League and 10 goals in 2007 CAF Confederation Cup.)
  - (Brazil) Rico, 2008 for Al-Muharraq
- Most international goals in a calendar year: 23 – (Hungary) Sándor Kocsis, 1954 (Note: Vivian Woodward scored 25 goals in 1909 including 14 goals for England national amateur football team.)
- Most international club goals in a calendar year: 21 – (Portugal) Cristiano Ronaldo, 2017
- Most top club competitions scored in one season with the same team: 7
  - (Spain) Fernando Torres, 2012–13 for Chelsea (Note: Torres scored in Premier League, FA Cup, Football League Cup, FA Community Shield, FIFA Club World Cup, UEFA Champions League and UEFA Europa League.)
  - (France) Kylian Mbappé, 2024–25 for Real Madrid (Note: Mbappé scored in La Liga, Copa del Rey, Supercopa de España, UEFA Champions League, UEFA Super Cup, FIFA Intercontinental Cup and FIFA Club World Cup.)

==== Most goals in a match ====
- Official match: 22 – (Poland) Jacek Magdziński, Wybrzeże Rewalskie Rewal 53–0 LKS Pomorzanin Nowogard, 2021–22 Polish Sixth Division, 14 November 2021 (Note: Ömer Temel scored 22 goals in his team Alemania 1890 II's 25–0 victory over Steglitz GB II in the Kreisliga C 2 Berlin (11th tier) on 26 May 2019. The match was not completed in the second half because the opposing team withdrew to avoid further heavy defeat in the scoreline, but the result was still counted. Orkun Mehmet Kalayci also scored 24 goals in his team SV Sodingen's 38–0 victory over SV Blau Weiß Böhring II in the German eleventh-tier amateur leagues in 2026. However, it was not recognized as a record since it occurred between reserve teams.)
- Top-tier league match: 17 – Passang Tshering, RIHS 0–20 Transport United, 2007 Bhutan A-Division, 4 August 2007
- Domestic cup match: 16 – (France) Stefan Dembicki, Lens 32–0 Auby Asturies, 1942–43 French Cup, 11 December 1942
- International match: 13 – Archie Thompson, Australia 31–0 American Samoa, 2002 FIFA World Cup qualification (OFC), 11 April 2001
- International club match: 7
  - (Zambia) Godfrey Chitalu, Kabwe Warriors 9–0 Majantja, 1972 African Cup of Champions Clubs, 6 February 1972
  - (Australia) Sasho Petrovski, Wollongong Wolves 16–0 Lotohaʻapai, 2001 OFC Club Championship, 9 January 2001
  - (Cook Islands) Lee Harmon Jr., Tupapa Maraerenga 14–0 Vaiala Tonga, 2024 OFC Men's Champions League, 20 February 2024

==== Youngest and oldest goalscorers ====
- Oldest goalscorer in a match: 74 years and 125 days – (Egypt) Ezzeldin Bahader, 6th of October v Genius, 2019–20 Egyptian Third Division, 9 March 2020
- Oldest goalscorer in a top-tier league match: 65 years, 239 days – Ronnie Brunswijk, Inter Moengotapoe v PVV, 2026–27 Suriname Major League, 1 November 2026
- Oldest goalscorer in a domestic cup match: 59 years and 174 days – (Japan) Kazuyoshi Miura, Fukushima United v Oyama, 2026–27 Emperor's Cup, 19 August 2026
- Oldest goalscorer in an international match: 45 years and 73 days – Billy Meredith, Wales v England, 1919–20 British Home Championship, 11 October 1919 (Note: This match was not a full international (instead termed a "Victory international"). The U.S. Virgin Islander Keithroy Cornelius could be the record holder with a goal scored against Curaçao national football team with 43 years and 196 days.)
- Oldest goalscorer in an international club competition match: 45 years and 15 days – (Zanzibar) Sabri Ramadhan Mzee, Mlandege v Sfaxien, 2020–21 CAF Champions League, 5 December 2020
- Youngest goalscorer in a match: 13 years and 325 days – Owenne Matapo, Avatiu v Titikaveka, 2013 Cook Islands Round Cup, 25 October 2013 (Note: The Cook Islands Round Cup is the top division of the Cook Islands Football Association, so Matapo is also the youngest goalscorer in a top-tier league match.)
- Youngest goalscorer in an international club competition match: 15 years and 279 days – (Honduras) Darixon Vuelto, Victoria v Luis Ángel Firpo, 2013–14 CONCACAF Champions League, 23 October 2013
- Youngest international goalscorer: 14 years and 93 days – Aung Kyaw Tun, Myanmar v Thailand, 2000 AFF Championship, 6 November 2000

==== Free kicks ====
Note: Includes direct free kicks only; excludes indirect free kicks.
- Most free kick goals: 78 – (Brazil) Marcelinho Carioca, 1988–2009 (Note: Other sources show Zico as the footballer with more free kicks scored in history with 101.)
- Most international free kick goals: 12 – (Argentina) Lionel Messi, 2005–2026
- Most free kick goals in a calendar year: 19 – (Chile) Jorge Aravena, 1983
- Most free kick goals in a match: 4 – (Germany) Benjamin Bender, SG Holzhausen/Steinperf v SG Dernbach-Wommelshausen, 2019–20 Kreisliga A Bidenkopf, 10 November 2019

==== Headers ====
- Most headed goals: 162 – (Scotland) Jimmy McGrory, 1921–1937 (Note: This includes ten headed goals scored between 1925 and 1932 in the Glasgow Cup, an official regional competition. Excluding regional competitions, Cristiano Ronaldo holds the record with 160 headed goals.)
- Most headed goals in a match: 5
  - Dolfattah, Malays v Singapore Recreation Club, 1931 Singapore Divison League, 24 April 1931
  - (Northern Ireland) Fred Roberts, Glentoran v Ards, 1932–33 Irish League, 24 September 1932
  - (Brazil) Dondinho, Yuracan v Smart FC, 1939 Itajubense Football Championship
  - (Socialist Federal Republic of Yugoslavia) Dušan Bajević, Yugoslavia v Venezuela, 1972 Brazil Independence Cup, 14 June 1972
  - (Scotland) Robert Wright, Dynamo Chernobyl v Saga, 1997–98 Works Double League, 14 June 1998
  - (England) Russ Dunkley, AFC Rushden & Diamonds v Cockfosters, 2013–14 FA Cup qualifying rounds, 17 September 2013
- Most headed goals in a season: 34 – (Northern Ireland) Fred Roberts, 1930–31
- Most international headed goals: 28 – (Portugal) Cristiano Ronaldo, 2002–2026

==== By method ====
- Most penalty kick goals: 184 (Note: Excluding shoot-outs.) – (Portugal) Cristiano Ronaldo, 2004–
- Most international penalty kick goals: 27 (Note: Excluding shoot-outs.) – (England) Harry Kane, 2015–
- Most penalty kick goals in a match: 4 (Note: The citated reference says literally "Peternac is still jointly holding the world record in top level football", but does not mention anyone else. However, it is proven that a few other footballers have scored 4 penalty goals in a single match.)
  - (Turkey) Zafer Tüzün, Fenerbahçe v Eskişehirspor, 1986–87 1.Lig, 1 February 1987
  - (Croatia) Alen Peternac, Real Valladolid v Real Oviedo, 1995–96 La Liga, 19 May 1996
  - (Czech Republic) Michal Kovář, Sigma Olomouc v Velbazhd Kyustendil, 2000 UEFA Intertoto Cup, 8 July 2000
  - (Brazil) Alex, Cruzeiro v Bahia, 2003 Campeonato Brasileiro Série A, 14 December 2003
- Most direct corner-kick goals: 11 – (Argentina) Ernesto Álvarez, 1968–1984 (Note: Some sources claim that the Turkish player Şükrü Gülesin scored 32 Olympic goals, but there is no reliable source confirming this achievement. It appears to be a myth that originated from an exaggerated claim about the number.) (Note: There is a discrepancy among historians regarding the exact number of Olympic goals scored by Ernesto Álvarez, with estimates ranging from 10 to 11.)
- Most direct corner-kick goals in a match: 3 – (England) Mark Pulling, Worthing v Corinthian-Casuals, 2003–04 Division One South, 20 March 2004
- Most bicycle kick goals: 35 – (Mexico) Hugo Sánchez, 1976–1997
- Most bicycle kick goals in a match: 2
  - (Argentina) (Colombia) Alfredo Di Stéfano, Millonarios v Deportivo Samarios, 1951 Campeonato Profesional, 2 September 1951
  - (Portugal) João Neves, Paris Saint-Germain v Toulouse, 2025–26 Ligue 1, 30 August 2025
- Most right foot goals: 636 – (Portugal) Cristiano Ronaldo, 2002–
- Most left foot goals: 788 – (Argentina) Lionel Messi, 2004–
- Most non-penalty goals: 822 – (Argentina) Lionel Messi, 2004–
- Most outside the box goals: 109 (Note: Outside the box goals do not include direct free kick goals.) – (Argentina) Lionel Messi, 2004–

==== Others ====
- Most hat-tricks: 142 – (Germany) Erwin Helmchen, 1924–1951 (Note: Counting only top matches, Pelé with 92 hat-tricks is the record holder.)
- Most international hat-tricks: 11 – (Argentina) Lionel Messi, 2004–2026
- Most braces: 186 – (Argentina) Lionel Messi, 2004–
- Most goals scored in finals: 36 – (Argentina) Lionel Messi, 2004–
- Most matches scoring: 662 – (Portugal) Cristiano Ronaldo, 2002–
- Most top-level club games scoring: 566 – (Portugal) Cristiano Ronaldo, 2002–
- Most international matches scoring: 96 – (Portugal) Cristiano Ronaldo, 2004–2026
- Most consecutive top-level club games scoring: 21 – (Austria) (Czechoslovakia) Josef Bican, 1939–1940
- Most consecutive international club games scoring: 12 – (Portugal) Cristiano Ronaldo, 2017–2018
- Most consecutive international matches scoring: 11
  - (Malaysia) Abdul Ghani Minhat, 1961–1962
  - (Norway) Erling Haaland, 2024–2025
- Most goals scored by a goalkeeper: 129 – (Brazil) Rogério Ceni, 1997–2015
- Most goals scored by a defender: 253 – (Netherlands) Ronald Koeman, 1980–1997
- Most goals scored by a midfielder: 501 – (Brazil) Zico, 1971–1994
- Most goals scored by a substitute in a single game: 10 – (American Samoa) Johnica Collins, Pago Youth v Utulei Youth, 2024 FFAS Senior League, 2 September 2024
- Most different years scored in: 29 – (Paraguay) Roque Santa Cruz, 1998–2026
- Most different years with national team scored in: 23 – (Portugal) Cristiano Ronaldo, 2004–2026
- Most different decades scored in: 5 – (Japan) Kazuyoshi Miura, (1980s, 1990s, 2000s, 2010s and 2020s)

=== Appearances records ===
==== Most appearances ====
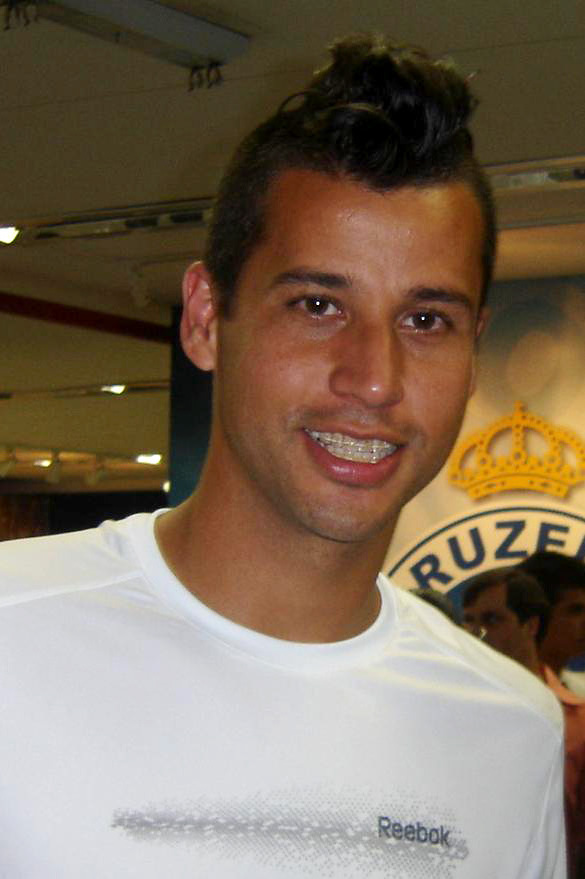
Fábio, the player with most appearances in official football history with 1,473 matches, is still active.

- Most official matches: 1,473 – (Brazil) Fábio, 1997–
- Most club matches: 1,473 – (Brazil) Fábio, 1997–
- Most international caps: 234 – (Portugal) Cristiano Ronaldo, 2003–2026
- Most official matches for one club: 1,197 – (Brazil) Rogério Ceni for São Paulo, 1992–2015
- Most domestic club competition matches: 1,192 – (Brazil) Fábio, 1997– (Note: English goalkeeper Paul Bastock played 1,286 games in domestic club competition but this tally includes more than 149 games in regional tournaments.)
- Most international club competition matches: 234 – (Portugal) Cristiano Ronaldo, 2002–
- Most matches contested in top-tier national league: 1,066 – (Brazil) Fábio, 2000– (Note: Including 210 games in Campeonato Mineiro and 85 games in Campeonato Carioca. If Brazil state leagues are not included, Peter Shilton would be the leader with the 848 games mentioned above.)
- Most matches contested in national league: 1,149 – (Brazil) Fábio, 1997– (Note: 771 games in Série A, 73 games in Série B and 10 games in Série C. Also including 210 games in Campeonato Mineiro and 85 games in Campeonato Carioca.)
- Most matches in a single league: 848 – (England) Peter Shilton in Football League First Division, 1966–1991

==== Most appearances in a year / season ====
- Most matches in a season: 89 – (Brazil) Oscar, 2012–13 (Note: Including 7 games with Brazil Olympic team.)
- Most club matches in a season: 75 – (Brazil) Rogério Ceni, 2005 for São Paulo
- Most international matches in a calendar year: 30 – (United States) Cobi Jones, 1993

==== Youngest and oldest ====
- Longest-lived football player: 106 years, 153 days – (Scotland) Sam Latter, 1904–2010
- Oldest-living football player: 101 years, 7 days – (Australia) Kevin O'Neill, born 14 November 1925
- Oldest football player: 91 years – (Brazil) Tércio Mariano de Rezende, 2013 (Note: The Guinness World Records named, in 2023, David Mudge as the oldest competitive football player with 79 years and 89 days. Nevertheless, he took part in a Northern Suburbs Football Association match, which is an Australian non-professional competition. Dickie Borthwick played his last game in December 2019 at the age of 83; he was member of a veterans league. Former Serie A Italian goalkeeper Lamberto Boranga played a game at the age of 83 in Italian seventh tier.)
- Oldest professional football player: 64 years, 205 days – (Uruguay) Robert Carmona, born 30 April 1962, Club Juventud Melilla, Canelones league (Note: Israeli goalkeeper Isaak Hayik had entered the Guinness Book of Records as the oldest football player of all time at the age of 73 in 2019, playing a game in the Israeli fourth tier. In 2020, Egyptian Ezzeldin Bahader broke Hayik's record playing a game in Egyptian third tier at the age of 74. Neither of them are professional players because they did not take part of the squad for the whole season. As Uruguayan fourth tier is an amateur competition, others mention Kazuyoshi Miura (b. 1967) in Japanese third tier or even Mykola Lykhovydov (b. 1966) in Ukrainian third tier as the oldest professional players. Last but not least, Pedro Ribeiro Lima played his last game at the age of 66 in 2014 for Perilima in Campeonato Paraibano Second Division.)
- Oldest player to start a professional career: 45 years, 185 days – (Ukraine) Mykola Lykhovydov, Real Pharma Odesa, 2011–12 Ukrainian Second League, 30 June 2011
- Oldest player in a domestic cup match: 61 years and 187 days – (Romania) Aurelian Ghișa, Sănătatea Cluj v Universitatea Craiova, 2025–26 Cupa României, 29 October 2025
- Oldest footballer in a top-tier league match: 54 years and 12 days – (Japan) Kazuyoshi Miura, Yokohama v Urawa Red Diamonds, 2021 J1 League, 10 March 2021 (Note: Salvador Reyes played the first 50 seconds of a Primera División de México Clausura 2008 match at the age of 71 but it was a tribute. He had been retired since he was 36.)
- Oldest footballer in an international match: 51 years and 345 days – George Weah, Liberia v Nigeria, friendly match, 11 September 2018 (Note: The Sercquiais Barrie Dewsbury played a game with 52 years and 11 days in 2003 but Sark football team is not recognised by FIFA.)
- Oldest player in an international club competition match: 46 years and 21 days – (Brazil) Fábio, Fluminense v Palmeiras, 2026 Copa Libertadores, 21 October 2026 (Note: Not taking into account Ronnie Brunswijk's record at the age of 60 in 2021 CONCACAF League which is very controversial due to match fixing suspects.)
- Youngest player in an international club competition match: 15 years and 197 days – (Cook Islands) Kima Webb, Tupapa Maraerenga v Vaipuna, 2025 OFC Men's Champions League, 15 February 2025
- Youngest footballer in an international match: 14 years and 2 days – Lucas Knecht, Northern Mariana Islands v Guam, 2008 East Asian Football Championship, 1 April 2007 (Note: Mathieu Enguérran Edjekpan is claimed to be the youngest ever international footballer according to some sources, making his debut with Benin national team at the age of 13 years and 213 days, but his date of birth is not clear. Gali Freitas is claimed by the AFF to have debuted with East Timor on 1 September 2018 in a match against Brunei, aged 13 years and 244 days. However, there is controversy whether he was born in 2004 or in 1996. Souleymane Mamam is claimed by FIFA to have debuted with Togo in 2021 in a FIFA World Cup qualifier match, aged 13 years and 310 days. However, there is controversy whether he was born in 1987 or in 1985. Abel Josiah Samson was also supposed to have played an international match with Tanzania national football team at 14 years old. Unofficially, Abdinur Mohamud, who made his debut at the age of 14 years and 59 days for Somalia in 2011, is the record holder.)
- Youngest footballer in top-tier: 12 years and 362 days – (Bolivia) Mauricio Baldivieso, Aurora v La Paz, 2009 Bolivian Primera División, 19 July 2009 (Note: He is also the youngest footballer to ever take part in a professional football match.)
- Youngest footballer at senior level: 10 years and 330 days – (Liberia) Eric Godpower Marshall, Gar'ou v Haifa, 2020–21 Liberian Fourth Division, 7 April 2021

==== Others ====
- Most matches as captain for one club: 964 – (Brazil) Rogério Ceni for São Paulo, 2001–2015
- Most seasons as captain for one club: 19 – (Italy) Francesco Totti for Roma, 1998–2017
- Most years at the same club: 28 – (Gibraltar) Lee Casciaro with Lincoln Red Imps, 1998– (Note: Casciaro has played a total of 37 seasons if one counts Lincoln's different youth teams.)
- Longest career span: 40 years – (Japan) Kazuyoshi Miura, 1986– (Note: Robert Carmona holds the Guinness World Record for the longest football career, but his career includes amateur teams, having started his junior career in 1976 and his senior career in 1980.)
- Longest international career span: 26 years (Note: George Weah, James Debbah and Giorgos Koudas had an international career span of 32, 31 and 27 years long respectively, but they all were given a farewell cameo appearance several years after their retirement. Billy Bohan, who played for the non-FIFA and non-UEFA Alderney official football team, had an international career of 27 years and 339 days.)
  - (Andorra) Ildefons Lima, 1997–2023
  - (Andorra) Marc Pujol, 2000–2026
- Professional footballer to play in the most different decades: 6 – (Uruguay) Robert Carmona, 1970s, 1980s, 1990s, 2000s, 2010s and 2020s
- Professional footballer who never played a single game: (Brazil) Carlos Kaiser, 1979–1992

=== Other players' records ===
==== Assists ====
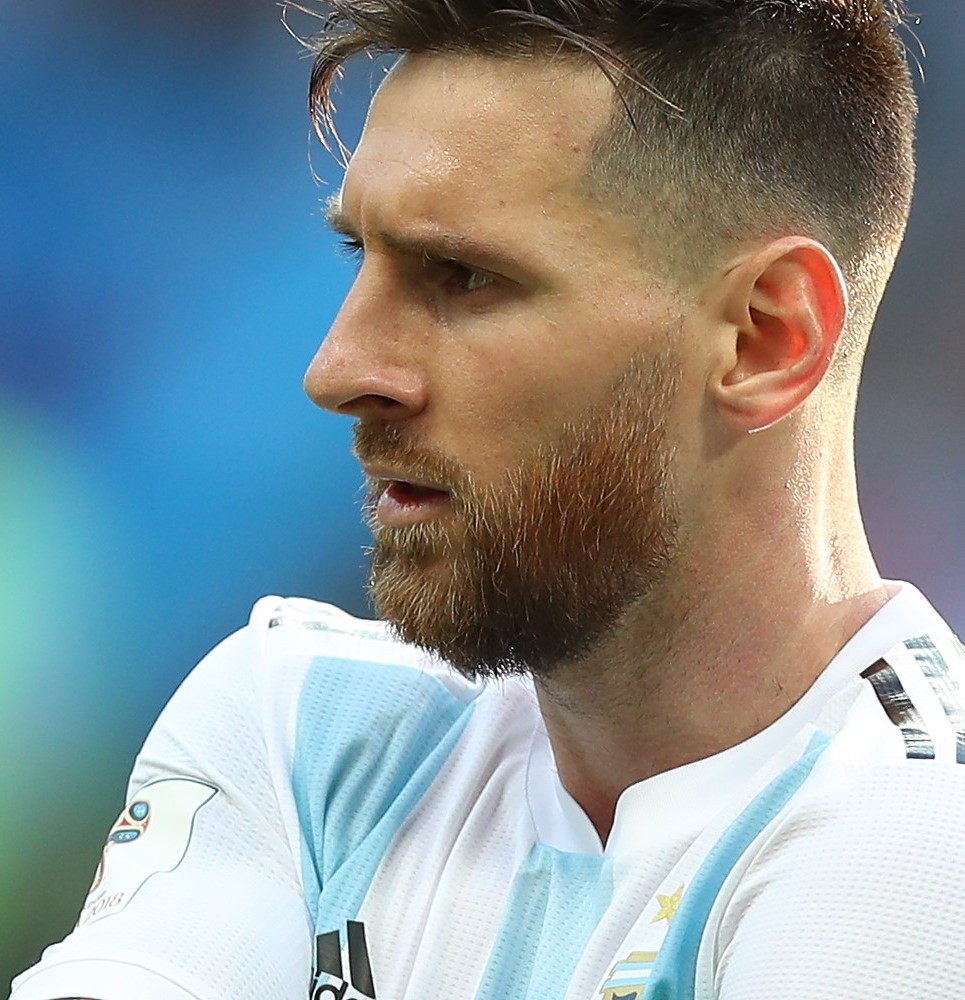
Lionel Messi, the player with the most assists in football history

Notes: The criteria for an assist to be awarded may vary according to the source, the following stats is based on the assists criteria according to Opta, where assists are not counted for balls that are deflected or rebounded off opposing players and have clearly affected the trajectory of the ball and its arrival to the recipient (the goal scorer). Assists are also not counted for penalty kicks, direct goals from corners or free kicks, or own goals.

- Most assists: 428 – (Argentina) Lionel Messi, 2004–
- Most club assists: 361 – (Argentina) Lionel Messi, 2004–
- Most international assists: 67 – (Argentina) Lionel Messi, 2005–2026
- Most assists for one club: 303 – (Brazil) Pelé for Santos, 1956–1974
- Most assists in calendar year: 41 – (Brazil) Marcelinho Carioca, 1994
- Most assists in a single league season: 27 – (Argentina) Carlos Peucelle, 1938 for River Plate
- Most assists in a match: 8 – (Estonia) Kaarel Torop, Tammeka 24–0 Pokkeriprod, 2011–12 Estonian Cup, 3 August 2011
- Most assists in an international match: 7 – Khodadad Azizi, Iran 17–0 Maldives, 1998 FIFA World Cup qualification (AFC), 2 June 1997

==== Titles ====
- Most decorated player: 63 – (Gibraltar) Lee Casciaro, 2000–
- Most titles for one club: 63 – (Gibraltar) Lee Casciaro for Lincoln Red Imps, 2000–
- Most decorated player at top-level: 44 (Note: Not including 2005 FIFA World Youth Championship and 2008 Olympic Games, which are not top-level, nor Campeones Cup.) – (Argentina) Lionel Messi, 2005–
- Most top-level titles for one club: 41 (Note: It includes only the main domestic competitions: the domestic league championship, the primary national cup, the super cup, and continental competitions. It does not include regional tournaments, exhibition competitions, or secondary domestic cup competitions.) – Fahad Hammoud for Al-Kuwait, 2007–
- Most top-tier league titles: 23 – (Gibraltar) Lee Casciaro, 2001–
- Most different top-tier league titles won: 5
  - (Serbia) Mateja Kežman (First League of FR Yugoslavia, Eredivisie, Premier League, Süper Lig and Belarusian Premier League)
  - (Brazil) Robinho (Campeonato Brasileiro Série A, La Liga, Serie A, Süper Lig and Chinese Super League)
  - (Brazil) Danilo (Campeonato Brasileiro Série A, La Liga, Serie A, Primeira Liga and Premier League)
  - (Portugal) João Cancelo (Bundesliga, La Liga, Serie A, Primeira Liga and Premier League)
- Most international club titles: 17 – (Croatia) Luka Modrić, 2014–
- Most different international club titles won: 6 – (Brazil) Rogério Ceni, 1993–2015 (Note: Rogério Ceni won Copa Libertadores, Copa CONMEBOL/Copa Sudamericana (both), Supercopa Libertadores, Recopa Sudamericana, FIFA Club World Cup and Intercontinental Cup for São Paulo.)
- Most national team titles: 7 (Note: Ángel Romano won six South American Championships (record) and one Olympic Gold medal. Both Scarone and Nasazzi won four South American Championships, two Olympic Gold medals and one FIFA World Cup title. Ochoa won six CONCACAF Gold Cups (record) and one CONCACAF Nations League.)
  - (Uruguay) Ángel Romano, 1916–1926
  - (Uruguay) Héctor Scarone, 1917–1930
  - (Uruguay) José Nasazzi, 1923–1935
  - (Mexico) Guillermo Ochoa, 2005–2026

==== Goalkeeping ====
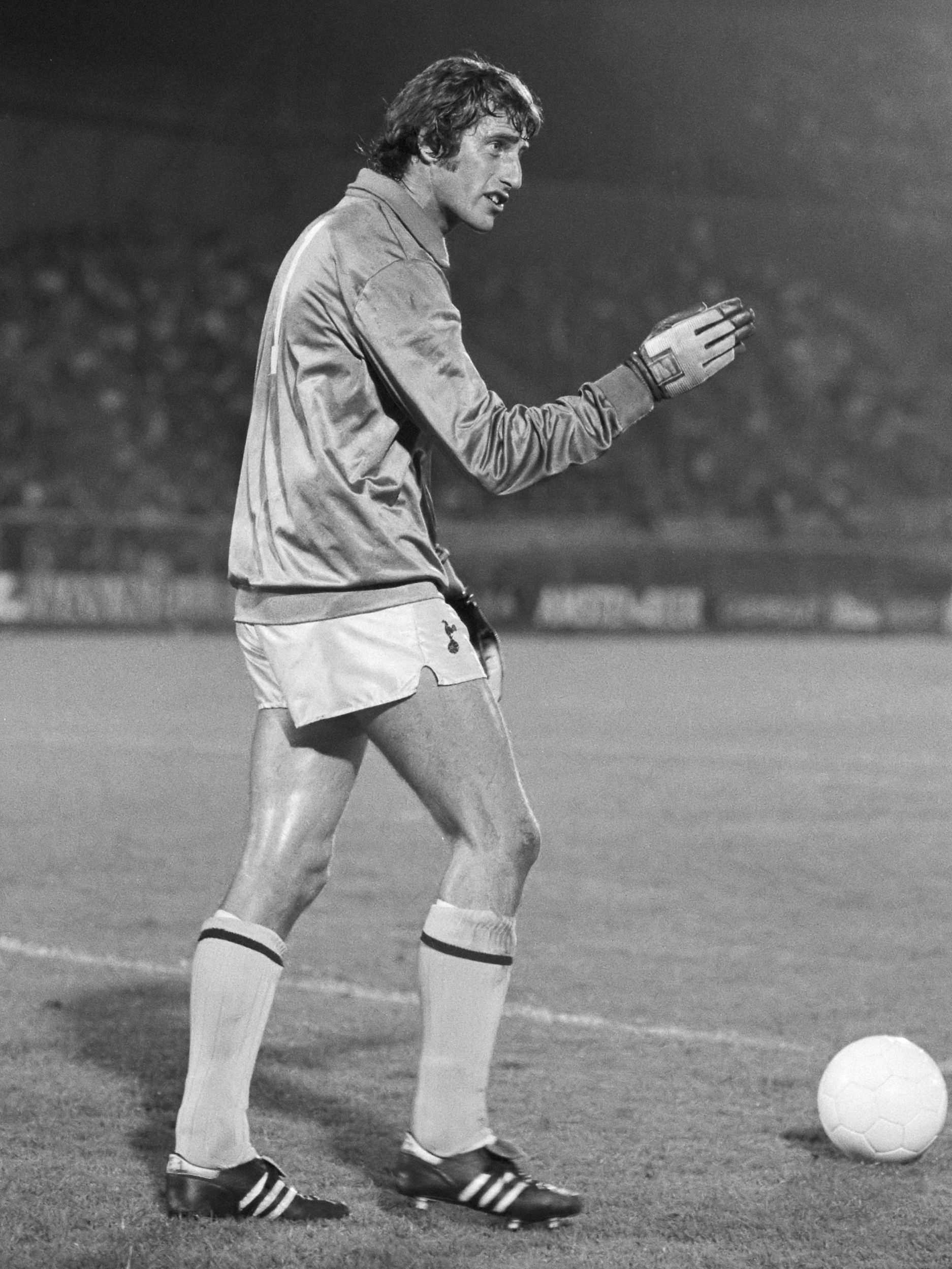
Ray Clemence holds the record for the most clean sheets in football history, with 568.

- Most clean sheets: 568 – (England) Ray Clemence, 1965–1988
- Most goals conceded: 1,456 – (Brazil) Fábio, 1997–
- Most clean sheets in a season: 45 – (Egypt) Essam El Hadary, 2005–06 for Al Ahly
- Most clean sheets in international games: 102 – (Spain) Iker Casillas, 2000–2016
- Most clean sheets in international club competitions: 79 – (Spain) Pepe Reina, 2000–2025
- Most clean sheets in domestic national league games: 331 – (Scotland) Charlie Shaw, 1906–1926
- Most consecutive minutes without conceding a goal: 1,816 minutes – (Brazil) Mazarópi, 1977–1978 (Note: Mazarópi's récord was in Campeonato Carioca.)
- Most consecutive minutes without conceding a goal in national leagues: 1,453 minutes – (Kuwait) Nawaf Al-Khaldi, 2011–2012
- Most consecutive minutes without conceding a goal in international games: 1,142 minutes – (Italy) Dino Zoff, 1972–1974
- Most penalties saved: 34 (Note: Not including penalty shoot-outs.) (Note: Some sources claim that Lev Yashin saved as many as 150 penalty kicks during his career; however, this figure is widely considered to be a myth that originated in the 1960s as part of Soviet-era propaganda and later exaggerations intended to enhance his reputation. In reality, records from official matches indicate that he saved 6 out of the 38 penalties he faced.) – (Brazil) Rogério Ceni, 1990–2015
- Most penalties saved in a match: 3 (Note: It does not include penalty kicks that were missed without a goalkeeper's save, such as those sent wide by the taker or those that struck the woodwork.) (Note: This does not include retaken penalty kicks for any reason, such as an infringement in execution, the goalkeeper leaving the goal line, or players encroaching into the penalty area before the kick. For example, in the match between Grêmio and Palestino Santiago in the 2026 Copa Sudamericana, a penalty was awarded to Grêmio in the 10th minute and was retaken twice; on all three occasions, the kicks were saved by the Palestino goalkeeper.) (Note: The following list does not include amateur leagues or reserve teams. If those competitions were included, the record would belong to Gerhard Dressel, who saved four penalty kicks in his team's 5–0 defeat to IG Bönen II while playing for BV 09 Hamm IV in the Kreisliga C1 Unna-Hamm on 22 September 2019.)
  - (England) Walter Scott, Grimsby Town v Burnley, 1908–09 Football League, 13 February 1909
  - (Chile) Salvador Gálvez, Unión San Felipe v San Luis Quillota, 1963 Campeonato Nacional Primera División, 23 June 1963
  - (Italy) José Cafaro, Platense v Banfield, 1973 Argentine Primera División B, 3 March 1973
  - (Belgium) Jean-François Gillet, Mechelen v Anderlecht, 2015–16 Belgian Pro League, 4 October 2015
  - (Scotland) Cammy Bell, Dundee United v Dunfermline Athletic, 2016–17 Scottish Championship, 10 September 2016

==== Matches results ====
- Most matches won: 888 – (Portugal) Cristiano Ronaldo, 2002–
- Most matches won in national league: 530 – (Portugal) Cristiano Ronaldo, 2002–
- Most club matches won: 746 – (Portugal) Cristiano Ronaldo, 2002–
- Most international matches won: 142 – (Portugal) Cristiano Ronaldo, 2003–
- Most unbeaten matches: 1,134 – (Portugal) Cristiano Ronaldo, 2002–
- Unbeaten streak by a national team player: 57 – (Spain) 'Carlos Marchena, 2003–2010

==== Trivia ====
- Most sent-off: 46 – (Colombia) Gerardo Bedoya, 1995–2015
- Most yellow cards: 274 – (Spain) Sergio Ramos, 2003–
- Most played with different clubs: 37 – (Argentina) Carlos Frontini, 2001–2020 (Note: Sebastián Abreu has the Guinness World Record with 32 different teams, because the majority of the teams recognised to Frontini are in any case top-level clubs. On the other hand, Englishman Jefferson Louis played for 42 different teams but his record is not recognized.)
- Most penalties missed: 38 – (Portugal) Cristiano Ronaldo, 2006–
- Most penalties missed in one match: 3 – Martin Palermo, Argentina v Colombia, 1999 Copa América, 4 July 1999
- Most goals scored in different divisions: 10 – (England) Jamie Cureton, 1994–2025
- Most played in different continental associations: 6
  - (Germany) Lutz Pfannenstiel, 1991–2011
  - (Netherlands) André Krul, 2007–
  - (Brazil) Sérgio Barboza, 2011–
- Fastest goal scored: 1.1 seconds – (England) Mike Smith, Windsor United v Meadowbrook Athletic, 1992–93 South Devon Football League, 28 April 1993
- Latest goal scored: 149 minutes – (Spain) Jesús Landa, Real Betis 2–2 Real Madrid, 1965–66 Copa del Rey, 15 May 1966 (Note: The leg was tied after an overtime and they continued playing until a goal was scored. Landa scored and the game finished.)
- Fastest hat-trick: 89 seconds – (Sweden) Magnus Arvidsson, Hässleholms IF 5–3 Landskrona BoIS, 1995–96 Swedish Second Division, 22 October 1995 (Note: Tommy Ross holds the Guinness World Record for the fastest hat-trick scored on 28 November 1964 within 90 seconds.)
- Longest distance goal scored: 96.01 meters – (Wales) Tom King, Newport County 1–1 Cheltenham Town, 2020–21 EFL League Two, 21 January 2021 (Note: Wilhelm Huxhorn broke the record for the longest goal in football history (103 meters) but his goal is not recognised as the longest by Guinness World Records.)
- Longest distance headed goal scored: 58.13 meters – (Norway) Jone Samuelsen, Odd Grenland 3–1 Tromsø, 2011 Tippeligaen, 25 September 2011
- Player to score 100+ goals for more different clubs: 4 – (Portugal) Cristiano Ronaldo, 2002– (Note: Cristiano scored more than 100 goals for all the clubs in which he played in but for Sporting CP where he only took part in 31 games.)
- Player to win top scorer awards in most continents: 3 – (Spain) Isidro Lángara, 1930–1948 (Note: Lángara won top scorer award with Real Club España in Mexico (CONCACAF) in 1944, 1946, Real Oviedo in Spain (UEFA) in 1934, 1935, 1936 and San Lorenzo in Argentina (CONMEBOL) in 1940.)
- Player to win top scorer awards in most top-tier national leagues: 4 – (Portugal) Cristiano Ronaldo, 2002– (Note: With Manchester United (Premier League) in 2008; with Real Madrid (La Liga) in 2011, 2014 and 2015; with Juventus (Serie A) in 2021 and with Al Nassr (Saudi Pro League) in 2024.)
- Most domestic top scorer awards: 15 – (Brazil) Romário, 1985–2009 (Note: Campeonato Carioca in 1986, 1987, 1996, 1997, 1998, 1999 and 2000; Eredivisie in 1988–89, 1989–90 and 1990–91; La Liga in 1993–94; Campeonato Brasileiro Série A in 2000, 2001 and 2005; USL First Division in 2006.) (Note: If we don't count Brazil state leagues, Josef Bican would be the record holder with 14 top scorer awards. He won Austrian Championship in 1934; Czechoslovak First League in 1938, 1939, 1946, 1947, 1948 and 1950; Bohemian/Moravian league in 1940, 1941, 1942, 1943 and 1944; Czechoslovak Second League in 1949 and 1952. He was awarded IFFHS Golden Ball as the greatest goalscorer of XX Century for that reason.)
- Most consecutive domestic top scorer awards: 9 – (Brazil) Pelé in Campeonato Paulista, 1957–1965 (Note: Imre Schlosser won 10 consecutive top scorer award in Hungarian National Championship between 1908 and 1917 but 1914 and 1915 Championships are considered unofficial due to the World War.)
- Player with biggest gap between spells at a club: 29 – (Paraguay) Paulo da Silva for Atlántida, 1995–2024 (Note: Paulo da Silva left Paraguayan club Atlántida in 1995 and returned in 2024, after 29 years.)

== Managers ==
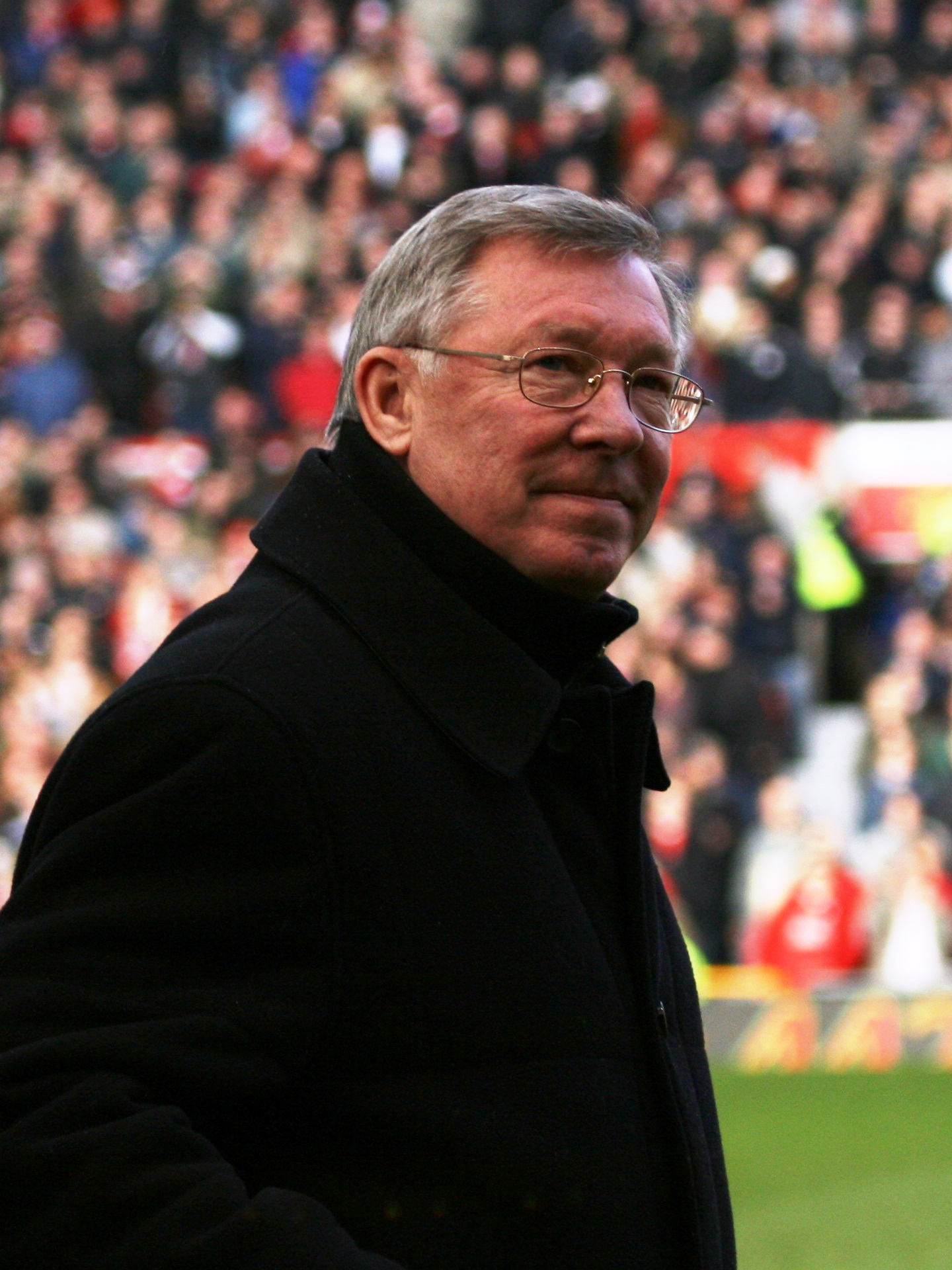
Alex Ferguson is the most decorated manager, with 49 titles.

=== Matches ===
- Most games coached in total: 2,155 – (Scotland) Alex Ferguson, 1974–2013
- Most games coached in a single club: 1,754 – (Scotland) Willie Maley for Celtic, 1897–1940 (Note: Post-World War II, Frenchman Guy Roux coached at least 1,747 games for AJ Auxerre.)
- Most games coached in national league: 1,478 (Note: Vanderlei Luxemburgo would be the leader with 1,510 games if we count State football leagues in Brazil.)
  - (Scotland) Alex Ferguson, 1974–2013
  - (England) Graham Turner, 1978–2014
- Most games coached in national league in a single club: 1,431 – (Scotland) Willie Maley for Celtic, 1897–1940
- Most games coached in international club competitions: 279 – (Scotland) Alex Ferguson, 1974–2013
- Most games coached in international club competitions in a single club: 232 – (Scotland) Alex Ferguson, 1986–2013
- Most international games in charge: 287 – (Serbia) Bora Milutinović, 1983–2009
- Most international games in charge for a single national team: 228 – Óscar Tabárez for Uruguay, 1988–2021 (Note: In two different periods, 1988–1990 and 2006–2021.)

=== Titles ===
- Most decorated manager: 49 – (Scotland) Alex Ferguson, 1974–2013 (Note: Willie Maley won 63 titles including fourteen Glasgow Cups and nineteen Glasgow Charity Cups, which are regional tournaments.)
- Most major international titles: 9 – (Argentina) Guillermo Stábile, 1939–1958 (Note: Stábile won the Copa América with Argentina (1941, 1945, 1946, 1947, 1955, 1957), the Pan American Games (1951, 1955) and the Panamerican Championship (1960).)
- Most top-tier league titles: 18 – (Scotland) Bill Struth, 1920–1954
- Most domestic club titles: 41 – (Scotland) Alex Ferguson, 1974–2013
- Most international club titles: 14 – (Italy) Carlo Ancelotti, 1997–

=== Other records ===
- Most finals won: 31 – (Scotland) Alex Ferguson, 1974–2013 (Note: It does not include the 1980 Drybrough Cup final, nor the 1990 FA Charity Shield, which ended in a draw between the two teams.)
- Longest-serving manager in history in a single club: 53 years – (Brazil) Amadeu Teixeira for América de Manaus, 1955–2008
- Longest career as national team coach with one national team: 19 years – Guillermo Stábile for Argentina, 1939–1958
- Most different clubs coached: 60 – (Brazil) Roberval Davino, 1984– (Note: Davino came to coach five different teams in a single year (1995).)
- Most different national teams coached: 12 (Note: Rudi Gutendorf holds the Guinness World Record for being in charge of 55 teams in 32 countries spanning six continental associations. Among them, he coached 18 different national teams but he only contested in official matches with 9 of them.)
  - (Germany) Otto Pfister, 1972–2018
  - (Belgium) Tom Saintfiet, 2008–
- Coach with biggest gap between spells at a club: 44 years – (England) Roy Hodgson for Bristol City, 1982–2026 (Note: Otto Rehhagel played for Hertha BSC until 1965 and coached the club in 2012, making a 47 years span between both calls.)
- Coach with biggest gap between spells at a national team: 38 years – Mircea Lucescu for Romania, 1986–2024
- Oldest manager: 93 years – (Wales) Ivor Powell
- Oldest manager in international club competitions: 80 years, 253 days – (France) Roger Lemerre, Étoile du Sahel v ES Tunis, 2021–22 CAF Champions League, 26 February 2022
- Oldest manager coaching a national team: 80 years, 240 days – Mircea Lucescu, Romania v Turkey, 2026 FIFA World Cup qualification, 26 March 2026

== Teams and competitions ==
=== Honours ===
- Most trophies won in top-level competitions: 127 – (Egypt) Al Ahly, 1923–2025
- Most successful national team: 23 titles – Argentina, 1921–2024 (Note: 2 CONMEBOL–UEFA Cup of Champions, 3 FIFA World Cups, 1 FIFA Confederations Cup, 1 Panamerican Championship, 16 Copa América.)
- Most international major trophies won: 35 – (Spain) Real Madrid, 1955–2024
- Most national major trophies won: 121 – (Scotland) Celtic, 1892–2026
- Most overall trophies won: 275 – (Northern Ireland) Linfield, 1891–2024
- Most national championships won: 57 – (Northern Ireland) Linfield, 1891–2025
- Most titles in the same competition: 57
  - (Brazil) ABC in Campeonato Potiguar, 1920–2022
  - Linfield in Northern Ireland Football League, 1891–2025
- Most national championships won in a row: 15 – (Vanuatu) Tafea in Port Vila Football League, 1994–2009

=== Longest streaks ===
- Winning streak: 61 – (Turkmenistan) Arkadag, 2023–2024 (Note: Some sources don't count this streak as a record because it comes from low-rated leagues; Arkadag itself has also been controversial since its fundation. The official record belongs to Al Hilal with 34 consecutive wins.)
- Winning streak by a national team: 19 – Morocco, 2024–2025
- Unbeaten streak: 79 – (Macau) Chao Pak Kei, 2019–2023 (Note: Chao Pak Kei went unbeaten in their streak from 10 April 2019 to 9 July 2023, spanning 79 consecutive matches. This included 67 matches in the Liga de Elite (Macao League) and 12 matches in the Taça de Macau (Macao Cup), with no participation in any continental or other official domestic competitions during this period. However, it is possible that the record is ultimately 70 rather than 79 matches, due to the non-recognition of the 2020 Liga de Elite as an official competition. That season consisted only of the first half of the league (nine matches), which was played before delays caused by the COVID-19 pandemic. The tournament appears not to be considered an official league season. Nevertheless, based on the results of that season, the team, along with Benfica de Macau, obtained an AFC license for participation in the following season's 2021 AFC Cup, before both clubs withdrew prior to the draw. As such, the official status of those matches remains a matter of debate.) (Note: Some sources don't count this streak as a record because it comes from low-rated leagues.)
- Unbeaten streak by a national team: 43 – Spain, 2024–2026
- Losing streak: 65 – (England) Woodford United, 2012–2013
- Losing streak by a national team: 61 – San Marino, 2004–2014 (Note: Alderney official football team had a losing streak of 97 matches between 1921 and 2003, but their team is not recognised by FIFA.)
- Winless streak by a national team: 140 – San Marino, 2004–2024
- Longest streak scoring at least 1 goal: 96 – (Argentina) River Plate, 1936–1939
- Longest streak scoring at least 1 goal by a national team: 66 – Hungary, 1949–1957
- Longest goalless streak: 1,057 minutes – (Azerbaijan) Sumgayit, 2025
- Longest league goalless streak: 1,408 minutes – (Azerbaijan) Khazar Lankaran, 2015–16
- Longest goalless streak by a national team: 1,852 minutes – San Marino, 2008–2011

=== Highest scores ===
- In a single match: (Madagascar) AS Adema 149–0 SO l'Emyrne, 2002 Malagasy Pro League, 31 October 2002 (Note: All 149 goals scored were own goals intentionally made by SO l'Emyrne players in protest of perceived referee bias against them.)
- In a single competitive match:
  - (Scotland) Arbroath 36–0 Bon Accord, 1885–86 Scottish Cup, 12 September 1885
  - (Estonia) Infonet Tallinn 36–0 Virtsu, 2015–16 Estonian Cup, 13 June 2015
  - Guyana Defence Force 36–0 Mainstay Goldstar, 2025 GFF Elite League, 22 September 2025
- In an international match: Australia 31–0 American Samoa, 2002 FIFA World Cup qualification (OFC), 11 April 2001
- Most penalties taken before a miss in a penalty shootout: 33 – (Qatar) Al-Rayyan 3–3 Umm Salal, (17–16 p), 2025–26 QSL Cup, 28 March 2026
- In a penalty shootout: 49 – (England) Washington 3–3 Bedlington, (25–24 p), Ernest Armstrong Memorial Cup, 9 March 2022 (Note: 54 penalties were needed to determin the winner of the match.)
- Longest penalty shootout: 56 – (Israel) Dimona 2–2 Shimshon Tel Aviv (23–22 p), 2023–24 Israeli Third Division, 20 May 2024
- In a draw match: 20 goals
  - Mchenga Coal Mine 10–10 Karonga Medicals, 2007 Malawi FAM Cup, 22 April 2007
  - (Germany) Lauenburger SV 10–10 Rahlstedter SC, 2022–23 Kreisklasse B, 20 August 2022

=== Season records ===
- Highest domestic points in total: 111
  - (England) Wrexham, 2022–23 National League
  - (England) Birmingham City, 2024–25 EFL League One
- Highest top-tier league points in total: 108
  - (Japan) Verdy Kawasaki, 1995 J.League
  - (Serbia) Red Star Belgrade, 2020–21 Serbian SuperLiga
- Biggest title-winning points margin: 35 – (North Macedonia) Shkëndija, 2017–18 Macedonian First Football League

=== Oldest ===
- Oldest football club that is still active: Since 1857 – (England) Sheffield
- Oldest football match: 1841 – (England) The Body-guard Club v Fear-nought Club, friendly, 25 December 1841
- Oldest football association: 1863 – (England) The Football Association
- Oldest competition: 1867 – (England) Youdan Cup
- Oldest competition that is still active: Since 1871 – (England) FA Cup
- Oldest international match: 1872 – Scotland 0–0 England, International friendly, 30 November 1872
- Oldest trophy that is still active: Since 1874 – (Scotland) Scottish Cup
- Oldest international competition: 1884 – (United Kingdom) British Home Championship, 1884–1984
- Oldest international club competition: 1897 – (Austria) Challenge Cup, 1897–1911 (Note: Football World Championship, a competition between English and Scottish club champions, was created in 1886 but it was considered an exhibition association football match and it wasn't held annually.)

=== Others ===
- Competition with most clubs participated in total: +20,000 – (Peru) Copa Perú (Note: More than 20,000 at the District stage; only 50 of them are part of the National stage. On the other hand, more than 5,000 teams participate in the French Cup every year, which is the largest competition worldwide.)
- Football League with fewest clubs: 2 – Isles of Scilly Football League (Note: Only two clubs contest the league: the Woolpack Wanderers and the Garrison Gunners, playing each other eighteen times every season.)
- Football League with most clubs: +100 – (Cape Verde) Cape Verdean Football Championship (Note: The championship is played out in a tournament between the champions of the nine islands.)
- Shortest National Championship: 7 days – (Greenland) Greenlandic Football Championship
- Only club in history to win top-flight league titles in 3 or more different countries: (Sudan) Al Hilal Club (Note: Due to the war in Sudan, the club has played in Mauritania and Rwanda; consequently they won several league titles in Sudan, one league title in Mauritania and one league title in Rwanda.)
- Longest football match: 3 hours and 23 minutes – (England) Stockport County 2–2 Doncaster Rovers, 1945–46 Football League Third Division North Cup, 30 March 1946 (Note: On, 30 March 1946. It was a Division Three North Cup replay, after the first game ended 2–2 and as it would turn out, 203 more minutes could not yield a victor. Tied once more at 2–2 after 90 minutes, the game between Stockport and Doncaster then went into extra time, but 30 more minutes were insufficient, with the two teams unable to score in that time period. The 'play to win' rule was commonplace in English football during the wartime period of the 1940s and it was a form of 'golden goal' – in essence, 'next goal wins'. Stockport thought they had clinched the winner on the 173rd minute but the goal was disallowed.)
- Most red cards given in a match: 36 – (Argentina) Claypole – Victoriano Arenas, 2010–11 Primera D Metropolitana, 3 March 2011
- Most games played on the same day: 3 – (Brazil) Grêmio, 1994 Campeonato Gaúcho, 11 December 1994 (Note: On 11 December 1994, Grêmio played three matches on a single day during the 1994 Campeonato Gaúcho, with kick-off times of 2PM, 4PM, and 6PM, due to their extensive schedule. They won two and drew the third match, using a total of 34 different players.)
- Most goals in football history: 13,085 – (Brazil) Flamengo, 1912–
- Most goals in history in top-level competitions: 9,219 – (England) Liverpool, 1896–
- Clubs who faced opponents from all six FIFA continental confederations in competitive matches:
  - (Germany) Bayern Munich
  - (New Zealand) Auckland City
- Clubs who played competitive matches in five different continents: (Note: They have never played an official match in Oceania, where an international competition has never been held.)
  - (Germany) Bayern Munich
  - (Spain) Real Madrid
- Winless national teams: Kiribati, Marshall Islands, Nauru, Niue & Vatican City (Note: None are members of FIFA but Kiribati and Niue are associate members of the Oceania Football Confederation (OFC). Kiribati haven't won any of their 11 games played in history, and they have not played a match since 2011, whereas the Marshall Islands have only played 2 matches, both in the 2025 Outrigger Cup, losing both, and Niue also playing only 2 in the 1983 South Pacific Games, losing heavily to Papua New Guinea and Tahiti. Nauru is expected to start playing for the 2028 Micronesian Games and Vatican City has only played 9 official games in more than 30 years.)
- Most relevant amateur football club: (Note: Honorary mention.) – (England) Corinthian

== Stadiums ==
- Oldest stadium: 1804 – (England) Sandygate (Note: The stadium opened in 1804 but it was not until 26 December 1860, that the world's first inter-club football match was played at the ground.)
- Largest stadium: 150,000 – (North Korea) Rungrado 1st of May Stadium (Note: Since it was remodelled in 2014 the official capacity is 114,000 spectators, which is also a record for a football pitch, but the stadium is still expandable up to 150,000.)
- Largest defunct stadium: 250,000 – (Czechoslovakia) Great Strahov Stadium (Note: It was barely used for football matches and it only had 56,000 individual seats. It also had a field three times as long and three times as wide as the standard association football pitch.)
- Highest stadium: 4,338 meters AMSL – (Peru) Estadio Daniel Alcides Carrión
- Largest attendance at a stadium: 199,854 – Maracanã Stadium, Uruguay v Brazil (FIFA World Cup), 16 July 1950 (Note: Despite holding the Guinness World Record, it is uncertain to ensure there were such amount of spectators that day. The same institution contradicts itself. According to other sources, there are other matches which are the record holders.)

== See also ==
- List of association football teams to have won four or more trophies in one season
- European association football club records and statistics
- Major achievements in association football by nation
- List of most expensive association football transfers
- Progression of association football caps record
- List of unbeaten football club seasons
