= Mykola Lykhovydov =

Ukrainian footballer and manager (born 1966)

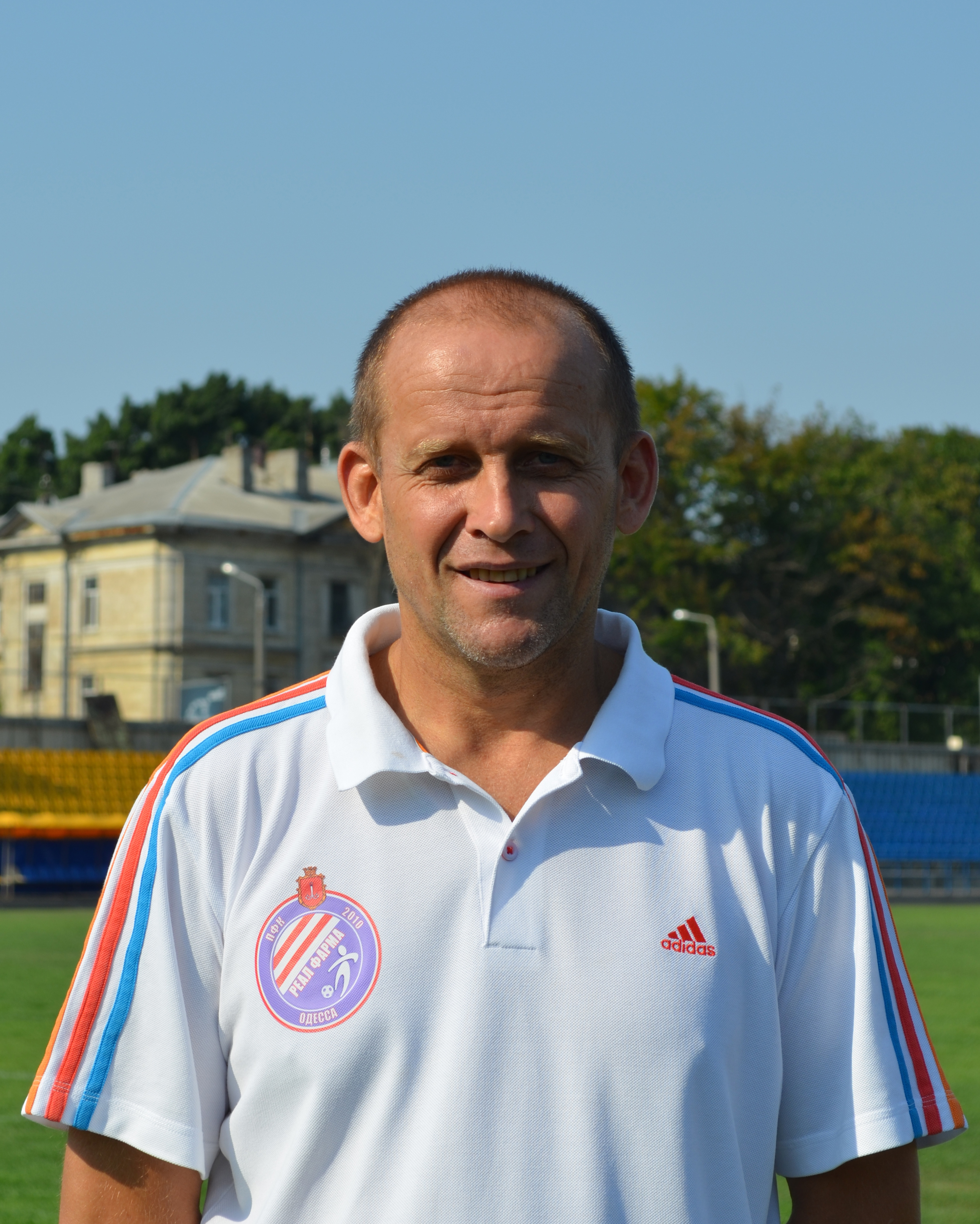
- Lykhovydov in 2016.

Personal information
- Full name: Mykola Ivanovych Lykhovydov
- Date of birth: 26 January 1966 (age 60)
- Place of birth: Nova Kovalivka, Ukrainian SSR
- Height: 1.76 m (5 ft 9 1/2 in)
- Position: Midfielder

Team information
- Current team: FC Real Pharma Odesa
- Number: 7

Senior career*
Years	Team	Apps	(Gls)
2011–	FC Real Pharma Odesa	210	(2)

Managerial career
- 2000–2003: FC Real Pharma Odesa
- 2009–2012: FC Real Pharma Odesa
- 2016–2017: FC Real Pharma Odesa
- 2019–2020: FC Real Pharma Odesa
- * Club domestic league appearances and goals as of 6 June 2026

Mykola Ivanovych Lykhovydov (Ukrainian: Микола Іванович Лиховидов; born 26 January 1966) is a Ukrainian football coach and player. He hols the world record for the oldest player to start a career in football.

== Career ==
Lykhovydov started his playing career at 45 when he came on as a substitute during a home match against FC Torpedo Mykolaiv on 27 April 2011. His professional debut came a few months later on 30 July 2011.

As of 2026, at the age of 60, he is the world's third oldest active player behind Kazu Miura and Robert Carmona.
