= Masters M70 triple jump world record progression =

This is the progression of world record improvements of the triple jump M70 division of Masters athletics.

Key

Incomplete information Pending

Distance	Wind	Athlete	Nationality	Birthdate	Location	Date
10.75	0.3	Lamberto Boranga	Italy	31.10.1942	Serravalle	03.11.2012
10.71		Kyoichiro Shimizu	Japan	1940	Maebashi City	22.08.2010
10.61	1.6	Shoji Ito	Japan	24.10.1930	Shizuoka	03.11.2000
10.41	1.9	Vaclav Bartl	Sweden	05.03.1926	Malmö	24.07.1996
10.29	1.8	Rolf Gustavsson	Sweden	07.01.1917	Pori	02.08.1987
10.17		Ian Hume	Canada	20.08.1914	Rome	22.06.1985
