= List of oldest professional athletes by sport =

The following is a list of sport's oldest professional athletes.

| Sport | Name | Age played | Year retired |
|---|---|---|---|
| Association football | Tércio Mariano de Rezende (Amateur) | 91 years | 2013 |
| Association football | Robert Carmona (Professional) | 64 years, 188 days | Active |
| Australian rules football | Sampson Hosking (SANFL) | 48 years, 159 days (interchange only) | 1936 |
| Australian rules football | Wally Watts (WAFL) | 44 years, 49 days | 1916 |
| Auto racing (Rallying) | Sobiesław Zasada | 91 years | 2021 |
| Baseball | Satchel Paige (one-off) | 59 years, 350 days | 1966 |
| Basketball (Men's) | Pierluigi Marzorati | 54 years | 2006 |
| Basketball (Women's) | Nancy Lieberman | 50 years | 2008 |
| Bodybuilding | Albert Beckles | 53 years | 1991 |
| Bowling | Carmen Salvino | 86 years | 2020 |
| Boxing | Albert Hughes | 70 years, 234 days | 2019 |
| Cricket (Tests) | Wilfred Rhodes | 52 years | 1930 |
| Cricket (First-class) | Raja Maharaj Singh | 72 years | 1950 |
| Cycling (Road) | Lex Nederlof | 52 years | 2018 |
| Cycling (Road) | Robert Marchand (Masters) | 106 years | 2018 |
| Cycling (Road women's) | Jeannie Longo | 53 years | 2011 |
| Cycling (track) | Shoichi Yuasa | 68 years | 1996 |
| Cycling (track) (women's) | Miyoko Takamatsu | 54 years, 11 months and 4 days | 2017 |
| Golf | Gary Player | 73 years | 2009 |
| Gymnastics | Oksana Chusovitina | 51 years, 138 days | Active |
| Gymnastics | Johanna Quaas (Amateur) | 86 years | 2012 |
| Ice hockey | Gordie Howe (one-off) | 69 years, 276 days | 1997 |
| Ice hockey | Gordie Howe (at retirement) | 52 years, 10 days | 1980 |
| Ice hockey | Jaromír Jágr | 54 years, 262 days | Active |
| International Darts | Paul Lim | 72 years, 283 days | Active |
| Lacrosse | John Tavares | 47 years | 2015 |
| Mixed Martial Arts | John Williams | 70 years, 139 days | 2010 |
| Rugby league | Billy Wilson | 40 years, 5 days | 1967 |
| Snooker | Fred Davis | 79 years | 1993 |
| Sumo | Hanakaze Daisaku | 51 years | 2022 |
| Surfing | Kelly Slater | 54 years, 266 days | Active |
| Tennis (women's) | Gail Falkenberg | 79 years, 291 days | 2026 |
| Tennis (men's) | Henry Young (Masters/Seniors) | 103 years, 39 days | Active |
| Tennis (men's) | Gardnar Mulloy (Professional) | 48 or 49 years | 1962 (as professional) |
| Track and Field | Stanisław Kowalski | 105 years, 75 days | 2022 |
| Volleyball | Miguel Maia | 55 years, 195 days | Active |

== See also ==
- List of oldest Major League Baseball players
- List of oldest National Hockey League players
- List of oldest and youngest National Basketball Association players
