= List of oldest Major League Baseball players =

List of professional athletes

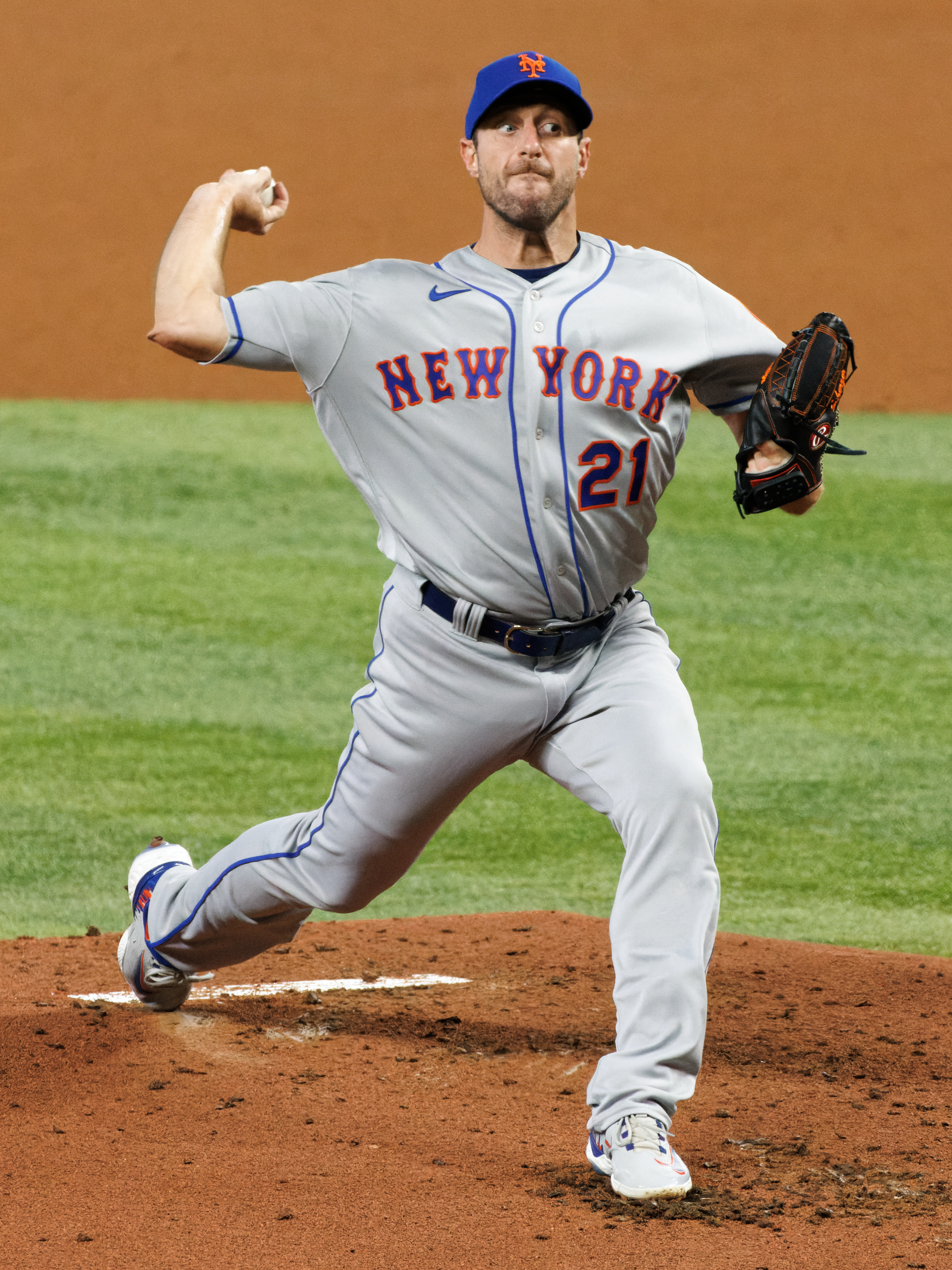
Max Scherzer is the oldest active MLB player.

This is a list of Baseball players. Major League Baseball (MLB) is a professional baseball organization in North America. The oldest person ever to play MLB was Satchel Paige, who, at the age of 59, made a major league appearance twelve years after his Major League career had ended. The oldest player to appear regularly was Jack Quinn, who ended his last season at age 50, having made 14 appearances as a relief pitcher in that final season. The oldest active player is Toronto Blue Jays pitcher Max Scherzer, who is currently 42 years old.

== Legend ==
Pos	P	C	1B	2B	3B	SS	LF	CF	RF	OF	DH
Position	Pitcher	Catcher	First baseman	Second baseman	Third baseman	Shortstop	Left fielder	Center fielder	Right fielder	Outfielder	Designated hitter

^	Denotes player who is still active in the MLB as of the 2026 season (Note: A player is considered inactive if he has announced his retirement or has not played for a full season.)
*	Denotes player who has been inducted to the Baseball Hall of Fame
^{†}	Denotes player who is not yet eligible for Hall of Fame consideration (Note: A player is not eligible for induction into the National Baseball Hall of Fame and Museum unless he has ten years of major league experience and has either been fully retired for five full seasons or has been dead for six full months.)
§	Eligible for Hall of Fame in 2027

== All-time ==
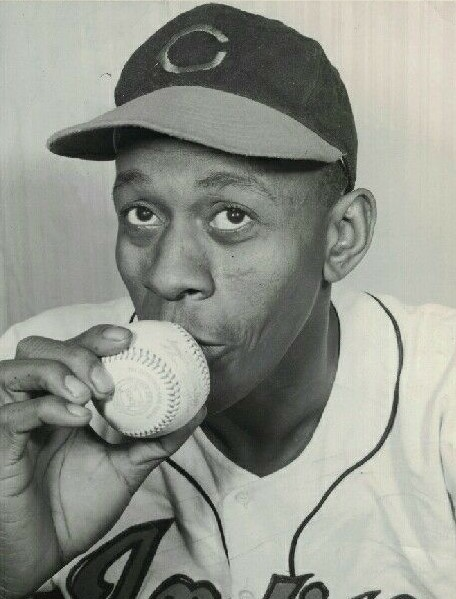
Satchel Paige is the oldest player ever to play in MLB.

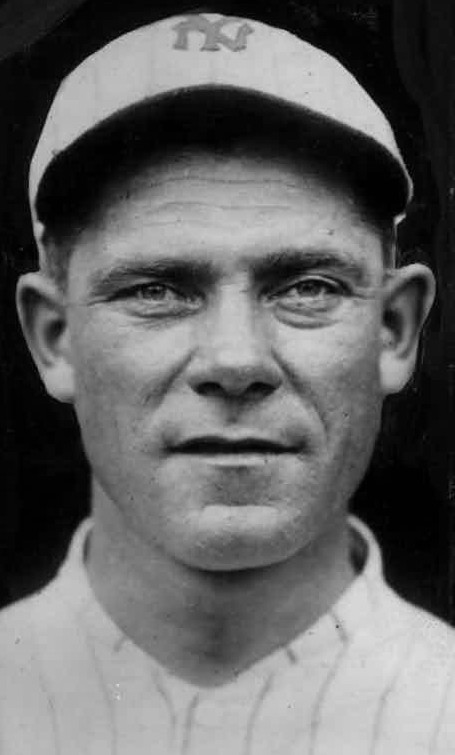
Jack Quinn is the oldest player to appear regularly.

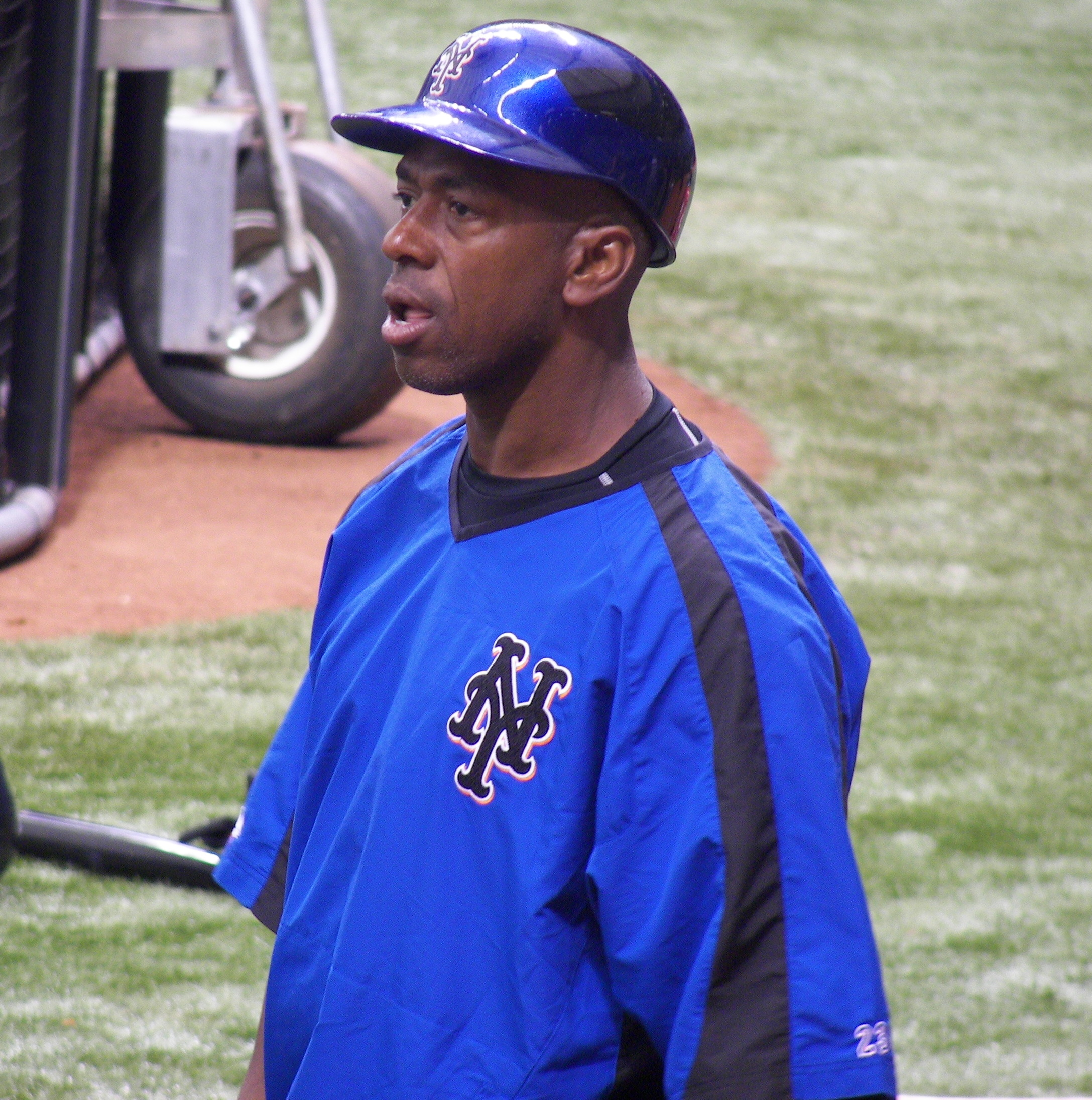
Julio Franco is the oldest position player to appear regularly.

Player	Pos	Birth date	Last game	Age	Team(s) played (years)	Ref.
Satchel Paige*	P	July 7, 1906	September 25, 1965	59 years, 80 days	9 teams: Negro leagues; Birmingham Black Barons (1927–1930); Cleveland Cubs (1931); Pittsburgh Crawfords (1933–1934, 1936); Kansas City Monarchs (1941–1947); New York Black Yankees (1941); Memphis Red Sox (1943) Major League Baseball; Cleveland Indians (1948–1949); St. Louis Browns (1951–1953); Kansas City Athletics (1965)	
Charley O'Leary	SS/2B/3B	October 15, 1875	September 30, 1934	58 years, 350 days	3 teams: Detroit Tigers (1904–1912); St. Louis Cardinals (1913); St. Louis Browns (1934)	
Nick Altrock	P	September 15, 1876	October 1, 1933	57 years, 16 days	4 teams: Louisville Colonels (1898); Boston Americans (1902–1903); Chicago White Sox (1903–1909); Washington Senators (1909, 1912–1915, 1918–1919, 1924, 1929, 1931, 1933)	
Minnie Miñoso*	LF/3B	November 29, 1923	October 5, 1980	56 years, 311 days	5 teams: Negro leagues; New York Cubans (1946–1948) Major League Baseball; Cleveland Indians (1949, 1951); Chicago White Sox (1951–1957); Cleveland Indians (1958–1959); Chicago White Sox (1960–1961); St. Louis Cardinals (1962); Washington Senators (1963); Chicago White Sox (1964, 1976, 1980)	
Jim O'Rourke*	OF/C/1B	September 1, 1850	September 22, 1904	54 years, 21 days	7 teams: Middletown Mansfields (1872); Boston Red Stockings / Red Caps (1873–1878); Providence Grays (1879); Boston Red Caps (1880); Buffalo Bisons (1881–1884); New York Giants (1885–1889); New York Giants (PL) (1890); New York Giants (1891–1892); Washington Senators (1893); New York Giants (1904)	
String Bean Williams	P	1873	1925	51 or 52 years	4 teams: Brooklyn Royal Giants (1923); Washington Potomacs (1924); Atlantic City Bacharach Giants (1924); New York Lincoln Giants (1925)	
Jack Quinn (Note: Jack Quinn is the oldest pitcher to appear regularly; made 14 appearances as a reliever in his final season before his career ended on July 7, 1933, 6 days after turning 50)	P	July 1, 1883	July 7, 1933	50 years, 6 days	8 teams: New York Highlanders (1909–1912); Boston Braves (1913); Baltimore Terrapins (1914–1915); Chicago White Sox (1918); New York Yankees (1919–1921); Boston Red Sox (1922–1925); Philadelphia Athletics (1925–1930); Brooklyn Robins / Dodgers (1931–1932); Cincinnati Reds (1933)	
Hoyt Wilhelm*	P	July 26, 1922	July 10, 1972	49 years, 350 days	9 teams: New York Giants (1952–1956); St. Louis Cardinals (1957); Cleveland Indians (1957–1958); Baltimore Orioles (1958–1962); Chicago White Sox (1963–1968); California Angels (1969); Atlanta Braves (1969–1970); Chicago Cubs (1970); Atlanta Braves (1971); Los Angeles Dodgers (1971–1972)	
Jimmy Austin	3B/SS	December 8, 1879	October 6, 1929	49 years, 302 days	2 teams: New York Highlanders (1909–1910); St. Louis Browns (1911–1923, 1925–1926, 1929)	
Arlie Latham	3B	March 15, 1860	September 30, 1909	49 years, 199 days	6 teams: Buffalo Bisons (1880); St. Louis Browns (1883–1889); Chicago Pirates (1890); Cincinnati Reds (1890–1895); St. Louis Browns (1896); Washington Senators (1899); New York Giants (1909)	
Jamie Moyer	P	November 18, 1962	May 27, 2012	49 years, 191 days	8 teams: Chicago Cubs (1986–1988); Texas Rangers (1989–1990); St. Louis Cardinals (1991); Baltimore Orioles (1993–1995); Boston Red Sox (1996); Seattle Mariners (1996–2006); Philadelphia Phillies (2006–2010); Colorado Rockies (2012)	
Hughie Jennings*	SS/1B	April 2, 1869	September 2, 1918	49 years, 153 days	5 teams: Louisville Colonels (1891–1893); Baltimore Orioles (1893–1899); Brooklyn Superbas (1899–1900); Philadelphia Phillies (1901–1902); Brooklyn Superbas (1903); Detroit Tigers (1907, 1909–1910, 1912, 1918)	
Julio Franco (Note: Julio Franco is the oldest position player to appear regularly; played 55 games in his final season before his career ended on September 9, 2007, 25 days after turning 49)	SS/2B/1B	August 23, 1958	September 17, 2007	49 years, 25 days	8 teams: Philadelphia Phillies (1982); Cleveland Indians (1983–1988); Texas Rangers (1989–1993); Chicago White Sox (1994); Cleveland Indians (1996–1997); Milwaukee Brewers (1997); Tampa Bay Devil Rays (1999); Atlanta Braves (2001–2005); New York Mets (2006–2007); Atlanta Braves (2007)	
Gabby Street	C	September 30, 1882	September 20, 1931	48 years, 355 days	5 teams: Cincinnati Reds (1904–1905); Boston Beaneaters (1905); Cincinnati Reds (1905); Washington Senators (1908–1911); New York Highlanders (1912); St. Louis Cardinals (1931)	
Deacon McGuire	C/1B	November 18, 1863	May 18, 1912	48 years, 182 days	11 teams: Toledo Blue Stockings (1884); Detroit Wolverines (1885); Philadelphia Quakers (1886–1888); Detroit Wolverines (1888); Cleveland Blues (1888); Rochester Broncos (1890); Washington Statesman / Senators (1891–1899); Brooklyn Superbas (1899–1901); Detroit Tigers (1902–1903); New York Highlanders (1904–1907); Boston Americans/Red Sox (1907–1908); Cleveland Naps (1908, 1910); Detroit Tigers (1912)	
Phil Niekro*	P	April 1, 1939	September 27, 1987	48 years, 179 days	4 teams: Milwaukee / Atlanta Braves (1964–1983); New York Yankees (1984–1985); Cleveland Indians (1986–1987); Toronto Blue Jays (1987); Atlanta Braves (1987)	
Johnny Evers*	2B	July 21, 1881	October 6, 1929	48 years, 77 days	4 teams: Chicago Orphans / Cubs (1902–1913); Boston Braves (1914–1917); Philadelphia Phillies (1917); Chicago White Sox (1922); Boston Braves (1929)	
Kaiser Wilhelm	P	January 26, 1874	August 21, 1921	47 years, 207 days	5 teams: Pittsburgh Pirates (1903); Boston Beaneaters (1904–1905); Brooklyn Superbas (1908–1910); Baltimore Terrapins (1914–1915); Philadelphia Phillies (1921)	
Hod Lisenbee	P	September 23, 1898	September 7, 1945	46 years, 349 days	4 teams: Washington Senators (1927–1928); Boston Red Sox (1929–1932); Philadelphia Athletics (1936); Cincinnati Reds (1945)	
Nolan Ryan*	P	January 31, 1947	September 22, 1993	46 years, 234 days	4 teams: New York Mets (1966, 1968–1971); California Angels (1972–1979); Houston Astros (1980–1988); Texas Rangers (1989–1993)	
Charlie Hough	P	January 5, 1948	July 26, 1994	46 years, 202 days	4 teams: Los Angeles Dodgers (1970–1980); Texas Rangers (1980–1990); Chicago White Sox (1991–1992); Florida Marlins (1993–1994)	
Sam Thompson*	RF	March 5, 1860	September 10, 1906	46 years, 189 days	3 teams: Detroit Wolverines (1885–1888); Philadelphia Quakers / Phillies (1889–1898); Detroit Tigers (1906)	
Jesse Orosco	P	April 21, 1957	September 27, 2003	46 years, 159 days	9 teams: New York Mets (1979, 1981–1987); Los Angeles Dodgers (1988); Cleveland Indians (1989–1991); Milwaukee Brewers (1992–1994); Baltimore Orioles (1995–1999); St. Louis Cardinals (2000); Los Angeles Dodgers (2001–2002); San Diego Padres (2003); New York Yankees (2003); Minnesota Twins (2003)	
Dan Brouthers*	1B	May 8, 1858	October 4, 1904	46 years, 149 days	10 teams: Troy Trojans (1879–1880); Buffalo Bisons (1881–1885); Detroit Wolverines (1886–1888); Boston Beaneaters (1889); Boston Reds (1890–1891); Brooklyn Grooms (1892–1893); Baltimore Orioles (1894–1895); Louisville Colonels (1895); Philadelphia Phillies (1896); New York Giants (1904)	
Grover Hartley	C	July 2, 1888	September 30, 1934	46 years, 90 days	5 teams: New York Giants (1911–1913); St. Louis Terriers (1914–1915); St. Louis Browns (1916–1917); New York Giants (1924–1926); Boston Red Sox (1927); Cleveland Indians (1929–1930); St. Louis Browns (1934)	
Bobo Newsom	P	August 11, 1907	September 17, 1953	46 years, 37 days	9 teams: Brooklyn Robins / Brooklyn Dodgers (1929–1930); Chicago Cubs (1932); St. Louis Browns (1934–1935); Washington Senators (1935–1937); Boston Red Sox (1937); St. Louis Browns (1938–1939); Detroit Tigers (1939–1941); Washington Senators (1942); Brooklyn Dodgers (1942–1943); St. Louis Browns (1943); Washington Senators (1943); Philadelphia Athletics (1944–1946); Washington Senators (1946–1947); New York Yankees (1947); New York Giants (1948); Washington Senators (1952); Philadelphia Athletics (1952–1953)	
Randy Johnson*	P	September 10, 1963	October 4, 2009	46 years, 24 days	6 teams: Montreal Expos (1988–1989); Seattle Mariners (1989–1998); Houston Astros (1998); Arizona Diamondbacks (1999–2004); New York Yankees (2005–2006); Arizona Diamondbacks (2007–2008); San Francisco Giants (2009)	
Tommy John	P	May 22, 1943	May 25, 1989	46 years, 3 days	6 teams: Cleveland Indians (1963–1964); Chicago White Sox (1965–1971); Los Angeles Dodgers (1972–1974, 1976–1978); New York Yankees (1979–1982); California Angels (1982–1985); Oakland Athletics (1985); New York Yankees (1986–1989)	
C. I. Taylor	RF/C	January 20, 1875	1921	46 years	Indianapolis ABCs (1920–1921)	
Kid Gleason	2B/P	October 26, 1866	August 27, 1912	45 years, 306 days	7 teams: Philadelphia Quakers / Phillies (1888–1891); St. Louis Browns (1892–1894); Baltimore Orioles (1894–1895); New York Giants (1896–1900); Detroit Tigers (1901–1902); Philadelphia Phillies (1903–1908); Chicago White Sox (1912)	
Carlton Fisk*	C	December 26, 1947	June 22, 1993	45 years, 178 days	2 teams: Boston Red Sox (1969, 1971–1980); Chicago White Sox (1981–1993)	
Cap Anson*	1B/3B/C	April 17, 1852	October 3, 1897	45 years, 169 days	3 teams: Rockford Forest Citys (1871); Philadelphia Athletics (1872–1875); Chicago White Stockings / Colts (1876–1897)	
Omar Vizquel	SS/3B	April 24, 1967	October 3, 2012	45 years, 162 days	6 teams: Seattle Mariners (1989–1993); Cleveland Indians (1994–2004); San Francisco Giants (2005–2008); Texas Rangers (2009); Chicago White Sox (2010–2011); Toronto Blue Jays (2012)	
Ichiro Suzuki*	RF	October 22, 1973	March 21, 2019	45 years, 150 days	3 teams: Seattle Mariners (2001–2012); New York Yankees (2012–2014); Miami Marlins (2015–2017); Seattle Mariners (2018–2019)	
Ted Lyons*	P	December 28, 1900	May 19, 1946	45 years, 142 days	Chicago White Sox (1923–1942, 1946)	
Rich Hill^{†}	P	March 11, 1980	July 28, 2025	45 years, 139 days	14 teams: Chicago Cubs (2005–2008); Baltimore Orioles (2009); Boston Red Sox (2010–2012); Cleveland Indians (2013); Los Angeles Angels of Anaheim (2014); New York Yankees (2014); Boston Red Sox (2015); Oakland Athletics (2016); Los Angeles Dodgers (2016–2019); Minnesota Twins (2020); Tampa Bay Rays (2021); New York Mets (2021); Boston Red Sox (2022); Pittsburgh Pirates (2023); San Diego Padres (2023); Boston Red Sox (2024); Kansas City Royals (2025)	
Pete Rose	OF/1B/3B	April 14, 1941	August 17, 1986	45 years, 125 days	3 teams: Cincinnati Reds (1963–1978); Philadelphia Phillies (1979–1983); Montreal Expos (1984); Cincinnati Reds (1984–1986)	
Bartolo Colón	P	May 24, 1973	September 22, 2018	45 years, 121 days	11 teams: Cleveland Indians (1997–2002); Montreal Expos (2002); Chicago White Sox (2003); Anaheim Angels / Los Angeles Angels of Anaheim (2004–2007); Boston Red Sox (2008); Chicago White Sox (2009); New York Yankees (2011); Oakland Athletics (2012–2013); New York Mets (2014–2016); Atlanta Braves (2017); Minnesota Twins (2017); Texas Rangers (2018)	
Fred Johnson	P	March 10, 1894	May 10, 1939	45 years, 61 days	2 teams: New York Giants (1922–1923); St. Louis Browns (1938–1939)	
Tim Wakefield	P	August 2, 1966	September 25, 2011	45 years, 54 days	2 teams: Pittsburgh Pirates (1992–1993); Boston Red Sox (1995–2011)	
Roger Clemens	P	August 4, 1962	September 16, 2007	45 years, 43 days	4 teams: Boston Red Sox (1984–1996); Toronto Blue Jays (1997–1998); New York Yankees (1999–2003); Houston Astros (2004–2006); New York Yankees (2007)	
Red Faber*	P	September 6, 1888	September 20, 1933	45 years, 14 days	Chicago White Sox (1914–1933)	
Gaylord Perry*	P	September 15, 1938	September 21, 1983	45 years, 6 days	8 teams: San Francisco Giants (1962–1971); Cleveland Indians (1972–1975); Texas Rangers (1975–1977); San Diego Padres (1978–1979); Texas Rangers (1980); New York Yankees (1980); Atlanta Braves (1981); Seattle Mariners (1982–1983); Kansas City Royals (1983)	

Note: Paige, O'Leary, O'Rourke, Jennings, Street, McGuire and Evers each made one token major league appearance years (or even decades) after their careers had otherwise ended. The careers of Altrock, Miñoso, Austin, and Latham had also effectively ended many years before their final major league appearances, though each were brought back for token appearances several times (spanning several seasons) before their final game. Julio Franco is the oldest position player to appear regularly.

== Active ==
Player	Pos	Birth date	Age	Team(s) played (years)	Ref.
Max Scherzer	P	July 27, 1984	42 years, 81 days	7 teams: Arizona Diamondbacks (2008–2009); Detroit Tigers (2010–2014); Washington Nationals (2015–2021); Los Angeles Dodgers (2021); New York Mets (2022–2023); Texas Rangers (2023–2024); Toronto Blue Jays (2025–present)	
Yu Darvish	P	August 16, 1986	40 years, 61 days	4 teams: Texas Rangers (2012–2014, 2016–2017); Los Angeles Dodgers (2017); Chicago Cubs (2018–2020); San Diego Padres (2021–2025)	
Caleb Thielbar	P	January 31, 1987	39 years, 258 days	2 teams: Minnesota Twins (2013–2015, 2020–2024); Chicago Cubs (2025–present)	
Paul Goldschmidt	1B	September 10, 1987	39 years, 36 days	3 teams: Arizona Diamondbacks (2011–2018); St. Louis Cardinals (2019–2024); New York Yankees (2025–present)	
Kenley Jansen	P	September 30, 1987	39 years, 16 days	5 teams: Los Angeles Dodgers (2010–2021); Atlanta Braves (2022); Boston Red Sox (2023–2024); Los Angeles Angels (2025); Detroit Tigers (2026–present)	
Aroldis Chapman	P	February 28, 1988	38 years, 230 days	7 teams: Cincinnati Reds (2010–2015); New York Yankees (2016); Chicago Cubs (2016); New York Yankees (2017–2022); Kansas City Royals (2023); Texas Rangers (2023); Pittsburgh Pirates (2024); Boston Red Sox (2025–present)	
Tommy Pham	LF/DH	March 8, 1988	38 years, 222 days	10 teams: St. Louis Cardinals (2014–2018); Tampa Bay Rays (2018–2019); San Diego Padres (2020–2021); Cincinnati Reds (2022); Boston Red Sox (2022); New York Mets (2023); Arizona Diamondbacks (2023); Chicago White Sox (2024); St. Louis Cardinals (2024); Kansas City Royals (2024); Pittsburgh Pirates (2025); New York Mets (2026); Chicago White Sox (2026–present)	
Craig Kimbrel	P	May 28, 1988	38 years, 141 days	12 teams: Atlanta Braves (2010–2014); San Diego Padres (2015); Boston Red Sox (2016–2018); Chicago Cubs (2019–2021); Chicago White Sox (2021); Los Angeles Dodgers (2022); Philadelphia Phillies (2023); Baltimore Orioles (2024); Atlanta Braves (2025); Houston Astros (2025); New York Mets (2026); Tampa Bay Rays (2026); Kansas City Royals (2026–present)	
Jacob deGrom	P	June 19, 1988	38 years, 119 days	2 teams: New York Mets (2014–2022); Texas Rangers (2023–present)	
Brooks Raley	P	June 29, 1988	38 years, 109 days	6 teams: Chicago Cubs (2012–2013); Cincinnati Reds (2020); Houston Astros (2020–2021); Tampa Bay Rays (2022); New York Mets (2023–2026); Philadelphia Phillies (2026–present)	
Blake Treinen	P	June 30, 1988	38 years, 108 days	3 teams: Washington Nationals (2014–2017); Oakland Athletics (2017–2019); Los Angeles Dodgers (2020–present)	
Merrill Kelly	P	October 14, 1988	38 years, 2 days	2 teams: Arizona Diamondbacks (2019–2025); Texas Rangers (2025); Arizona Diamondbacks (2026–present)	
José Quintana	P	January 24, 1989	37 years, 265 days	9 teams: Chicago White Sox (2012–2017); Chicago Cubs (2017–2020); Los Angeles Angels (2021); San Francisco Giants (2021); Pittsburgh Pirates (2022); St. Louis Cardinals (2022); New York Mets (2023–2024); Milwaukee Brewers (2025); Colorado Rockies (2026–present)	
Travis d'Arnaud	C	February 10, 1989	37 years, 248 days	5 teams: New York Mets (2013–2019); Los Angeles Dodgers (2019); Tampa Bay Rays (2019); Atlanta Braves (2020–2024); Los Angeles Angels (2025–present)	
Chris Bassitt	P	February 22, 1989	37 years, 236 days	5 teams: Chicago White Sox (2014); Oakland Athletics (2015–2016, 2018–2021); New York Mets (2022); Toronto Blue Jays (2023–2025); Baltimore Orioles (2026–present)	
Chris Sale	P	March 30, 1989	37 years, 200 days	3 teams: Chicago White Sox (2010–2016); Boston Red Sox (2017–2019, 2021–2023); Atlanta Braves (2024–present)	
Patrick Corbin	P	July 19, 1989	37 years, 89 days	4 teams: Arizona Diamondbacks (2012–2018); Washington Nationals (2019–2024); Texas Rangers (2025); Toronto Blue Jays (2026–present)	
Brent Suter	P	August 29, 1989	37 years, 48 days	5 teams: Milwaukee Brewers (2016–2022); Colorado Rockies (2023); Cincinnati Reds (2024–2025); Los Angeles Angels (2026); Atlanta Braves (2026–present)	
Freddie Freeman	1B	September 12, 1989	37 years, 34 days	2 teams: Atlanta Braves (2010–2021); Los Angeles Dodgers (2022–present)	
George Springer	DH	September 19, 1989	37 years, 27 days	2 teams: Houston Astros (2014–2020); Toronto Blue Jays (2021–present)	

== Last ten seasons ==
Player	Pos	Birth date	Last game	Age	Team(s) played (years)	Ref.
Ichiro Suzuki*	RF	October 22, 1973	March 21, 2019	45 years, 150 days	3 teams: Seattle Mariners (2001–2012); New York Yankees (2012–2014); Miami Marlins (2015–2017); Seattle Mariners (2018–2019)	
Rich Hill^{†}	P	March 11, 1980	July 28, 2025	45 years, 139 days	14 teams: Chicago Cubs (2005–2008); Baltimore Orioles (2009); Boston Red Sox (2010–2012); Cleveland Indians (2013); Los Angeles Angels of Anaheim (2014); New York Yankees (2014); Boston Red Sox (2015); Oakland Athletics (2016); Los Angeles Dodgers (2016–2019); Minnesota Twins (2020); Tampa Bay Rays (2021); New York Mets (2021); Boston Red Sox (2022); Pittsburgh Pirates (2023); San Diego Padres (2023); Boston Red Sox (2024); Kansas City Royals (2025)	
Bartolo Colón	P	May 24, 1973	September 22, 2018	45 years, 121 days	11 teams: Cleveland Indians (1997–2002); Montreal Expos (2002); Chicago White Sox (2003); Anaheim Angels / Los Angeles Angels of Anaheim (2004–2007); Boston Red Sox (2008); Chicago White Sox (2009); New York Yankees (2011); Oakland Athletics (2012–2013); New York Mets (2014–2016); Atlanta Braves (2017); Minnesota Twins (2017); Texas Rangers (2018)	
Justin Verlander^{†}	P	February 20, 1983	September 26, 2026	43 years, 218 days	4 teams: Detroit Tigers (2005–2017); Houston Astros (2017–2020, 2022); New York Mets (2023); Houston Astros (2023–2024); San Francisco Giants (2025); Detroit Tigers (2026)	
Nelson Cruz^{†}	DH/RF	July 1, 1980	July 3, 2023	43 years, 2 days	8 teams: Milwaukee Brewers (2005); Texas Rangers (2006–2013); Baltimore Orioles (2014); Seattle Mariners (2015–2018); Minnesota Twins (2019–2021); Tampa Bay Rays (2021); Washington Nationals (2022); San Diego Padres (2023)	
R. A. Dickey	P	October 29, 1974	September 26, 2017	42 years, 332 days	6 teams: Texas Rangers (2001, 2003–2006); Seattle Mariners (2008); Minnesota Twins (2009); New York Mets (2010–2012); Toronto Blue Jays (2013–2016); Atlanta Braves (2017)	
Albert Pujols^{†}	1B/LF/3B	January 16, 1980	October 4, 2022	42 years, 261 days	3 teams: St. Louis Cardinals (2001–2011); Los Angeles Angels of Anaheim / Angels (2012–2021); Los Angeles Dodgers (2021); St. Louis Cardinals (2022)	
Fernando Rodney	P	March 18, 1977	September 28, 2019	42 years, 194 days	11 teams: Detroit Tigers (2002–2003, 2005–2009); Los Angeles Angels of Anaheim (2010–2011); Tampa Bay Rays (2012–2013); Seattle Mariners (2014–2015); Chicago Cubs (2015); San Diego Padres (2016); Miami Marlins (2016); Arizona Diamondbacks (2017); Minnesota Twins (2018); Oakland Athletics (2018–2019); Washington Nationals (2019)	
Koji Uehara	P	April 3, 1975	September 2, 2017	42 years, 152 days	4 teams: Baltimore Orioles (2009–2011); Texas Rangers (2011–2012); Boston Red Sox (2013–2016); Chicago Cubs (2017)	
Max Scherzer^	P	July 27, 1984	Present	42 years, 81 days	7 teams: Arizona Diamondbacks (2008–2009); Detroit Tigers (2010–2014); Washington Nationals (2015–2021); Los Angeles Dodgers (2021); New York Mets (2022–2023); Texas Rangers (2023–2024); Toronto Blue Jays (2025–present)	
Adam Wainwright^{†}	P	August 30, 1981	October 1, 2023	42 years, 32 days	St. Louis Cardinals (2005–2010, 2012–2023)	
Jesse Chavez^{†}	P	August 21, 1983	July 13, 2025	41 years, 326 days	9 teams: Pittsburgh Pirates (2008–2009); Atlanta Braves (2010); Kansas City Royals (2010–2011); Toronto Blue Jays (2012); Oakland Athletics (2012–2015); Toronto Blue Jays (2016); Los Angeles Dodgers (2016); Los Angeles Angels (2017); Texas Rangers (2018); Chicago Cubs (2018); Texas Rangers (2019–2020); Atlanta Braves (2021); Chicago Cubs (2022); Atlanta Braves (2022); Los Angeles Angels (2022); Atlanta Braves (2022–2025)	
Charlie Morton^{†}	P	November 12, 1983	September 28, 2025	41 years, 320 days	7 teams: Atlanta Braves (2008); Pittsburgh Pirates (2009–2015); Philadelphia Phillies (2016); Houston Astros (2017–2018); Tampa Bay Rays (2019–2020); Atlanta Braves (2021–2024); Baltimore Orioles (2025); Detroit Tigers (2025); Atlanta Braves (2025)	
Jason Grilli	P	November 11, 1976	October 1, 2017	40 years, 324 days	9 teams: Florida Marlins (2000–2001); Chicago White Sox (2004); Detroit Tigers (2005–2008); Colorado Rockies (2008–2009); Texas Rangers (2009); Pittsburgh Pirates (2011–2014); Los Angeles Angels of Anaheim (2014); Atlanta Braves (2015–2016); Toronto Blue Jays (2016–2017); Texas Rangers (2017)	
Yuli Gurriel^{†}	1B/3B	June 9, 1984	April 27, 2025	40 years, 322 days	4 teams: Houston Astros (2016–2022); Miami Marlins (2023); Kansas City Royals (2024); San Diego Padres (2025)	
Justin Turner^{†}	3B/1B/2B	November 23, 1984	September 28, 2025	40 years, 309 days	7 teams: Baltimore Orioles (2009–2010); New York Mets (2010–2013); Los Angeles Dodgers (2014–2022); Boston Red Sox (2023); Toronto Blue Jays (2024); Seattle Mariners (2024); Chicago Cubs (2025)	
Óliver Pérez^{†}	P	August 15, 1981	April 24, 2022	40 years, 252 days	8 teams: San Diego Padres (2002–2003); Pittsburgh Pirates (2003–2006); New York Mets (2006–2010); Seattle Mariners (2012–2013); Arizona Diamondbacks (2014–2015); Houston Astros (2015); Washington Nationals (2016–2017); Cleveland Indians (2018–2021); Arizona Diamondbacks (2022)	
David Robertson^{†}	P	April 9, 1985	September 28, 2025	40 years, 172 days	8 teams: New York Yankees (2008–2014); Chicago White Sox (2015–2017); New York Yankees (2017–2018); Philadelphia Phillies (2019); Tampa Bay Rays (2021); Chicago Cubs (2022); Philadelphia Phillies (2022); New York Mets (2023); Miami Marlins (2023); Texas Rangers (2024); Philadelphia Phillies (2025)	
Miguel Cabrera^{†}	1B/3B/LF	April 18, 1983	October 1, 2023	40 years, 166 days	2 teams: Florida Marlins (2003–2007); Detroit Tigers (2008–2023)	
Carlos Beltrán*	CF	April 24, 1977	October 1, 2017	40 years, 160 days	7 teams: Kansas City Royals (1998–2004); Houston Astros (2004); New York Mets (2005–2011); San Francisco Giants (2011); St. Louis Cardinals (2012–2013); New York Yankees (2014–2016); Texas Rangers (2016); Houston Astros (2017)	
Bronson Arroyo	P	February 24, 1977	June 18, 2017	40 years, 114 days	4 teams: Pittsburgh Pirates (2000–2002); Boston Red Sox (2003–2005); Cincinnati Reds (2006–2013); Arizona Diamondbacks (2014); Cincinnati Reds (2017)	
Erik Kratz	C	June 15, 1980	September 23, 2020	40 years, 100 days	9 teams: Pittsburgh Pirates (2010); Philadelphia Phillies (2011–2013); Toronto Blue Jays (2014); Kansas City Royals (2014–2015); Philadelphia Phillies (2015); Houston Astros (2016); Pittsburgh Pirates (2016); New York Yankees (2017); Milwaukee Brewers (2018); San Francisco Giants (2019); Tampa Bay Rays (2019); New York Yankees (2020)	
Yadier Molina^{†}	C	July 13, 1982	October 5, 2022	40 years, 84 days	St. Louis Cardinals (2004–2022)	
Joaquín Benoit	P	July 26, 1977	September 7, 2017	40 years, 43 days	8 teams: Texas Rangers (2001–2008); Tampa Bay Rays (2010); Detroit Tigers (2011–2013); San Diego Padres (2014–2015); Seattle Mariners (2016); Toronto Blue Jays (2016); Philadelphia Phillies (2017); Pittsburgh Pirates (2017)	
Chris Martin^{†}	P	June 2, 1986	July 11, 2026	40 years, 39 days	7 teams: Colorado Rockies (2014); New York Yankees (2015); Texas Rangers (2018–2019); Atlanta Braves (2019–2021); Chicago Cubs (2022); Los Angeles Dodgers (2022); Boston Red Sox (2023–2024); Texas Rangers (2025–2026)	
Joey Votto^{†}	1B	September 10, 1983	October 1, 2023	40 years, 21 days	Cincinnati Reds (2007–2023)	

== See also ==
- List of oldest professional athletes by sport
- List of oldest and youngest NBA players
- List of oldest National Hockey League players
