= Ezzeldin Bahader =

Egyptian footballer (born 1945)

Personal information
- Full name: Ezzeldin Mohamed Ali Bahader
- Date of birth: 3 November 1945 (age 81)
- Position: Forward

Senior career*
Years	Team	Apps	(Gls)
2020	6th of October	2	(1)
- * Club domestic league appearances and goals

Ezzeldin Mohamed Ali Bahader (Arabic: عز الدين محمد علي بهادر; born 3 November 1945) is an Egyptian former footballer who played as a forward. He is known for being the oldest professional footballer to play in an official game, at 74 years old.

== Career ==
On 7 March 2020, Guinness World Records named Bahader the oldest active football player at 74 years and 125 days. He broke Israeli goalkeeper Isaak Hayik's record, who had become the oldest on 5 April 2019 at the age of 73.

On 9 March 2020, Bahader made his debut for 6th of October, scoring a penalty against Genius in the Egyptian Third Division. He became the oldest footballer to score in an official game.

On 17 October 2020, Bahader became the oldest footballer in history, aged 74 years and 348 days, playing against El Ayat Sports in a 3–2 defeat.

== Personal life ==
Bahader is a civil engineer by trade. He has six grandchildren.
