= List of oldest National Hockey League players =

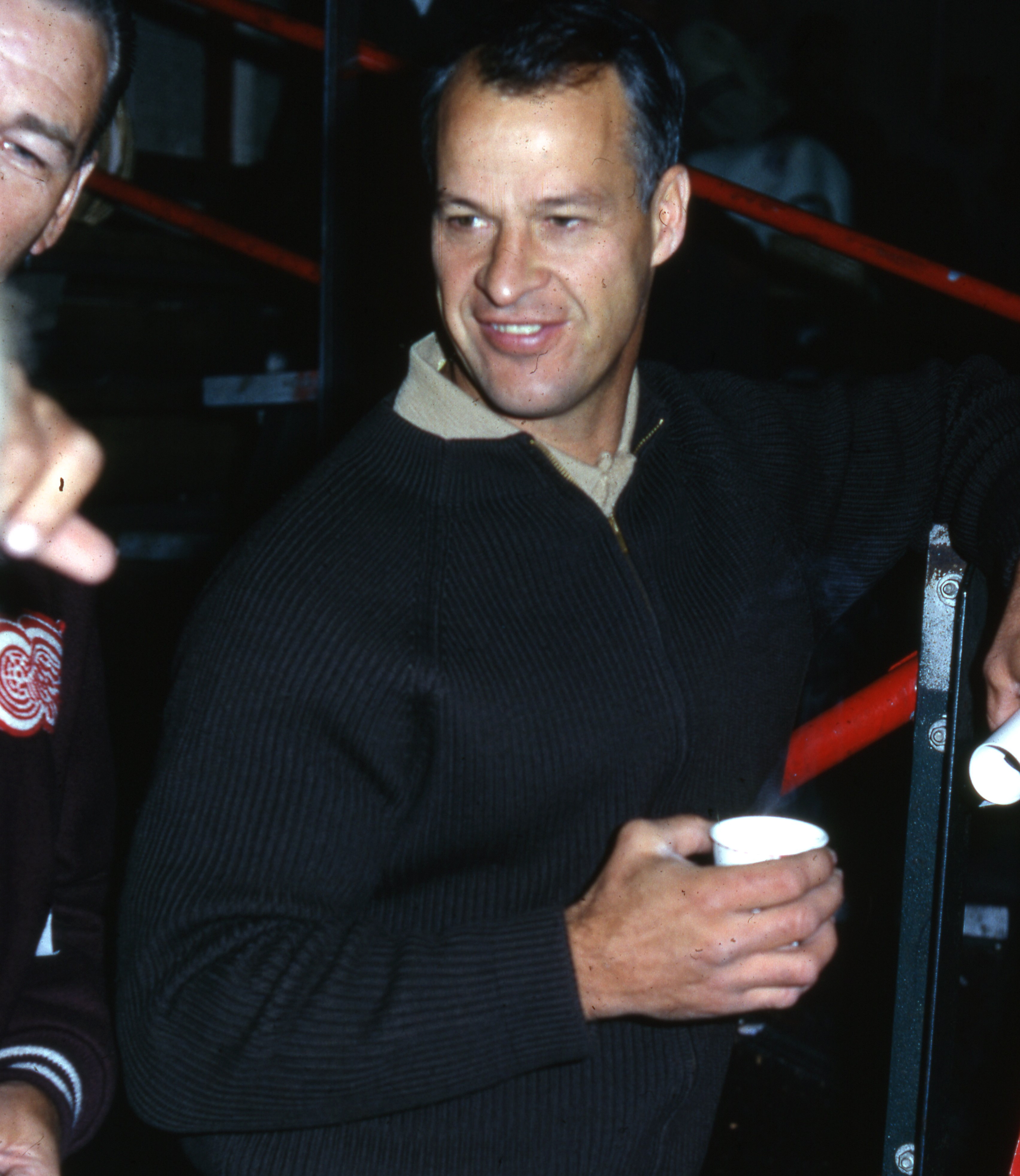
Gordie Howe, pictured here in 1966, played his final NHL game at 52.

Below is the List of oldest National Hockey League (NHL) players, with their last year in parentheses. Only hockey players who played at least one game in the regular season or playoffs when they were 40 or older are included on the list.

== Oldest players in a regular season or playoff game ==
=== Goaltenders ===
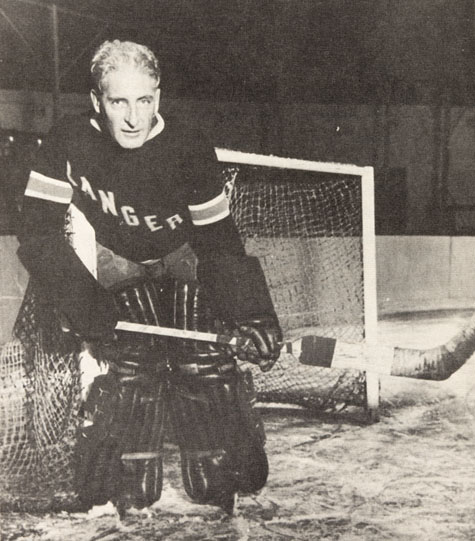
Lester Patrick served as a replacement goaltender in the 1928 Stanley Cup Finals. At age 44, he remains the oldest goaltender in playoff history.

- 45 years, 345 days – Maurice Roberts (1951)^{[4]}
- 45 years, 32 days – Johnny Bower (1969)
- 44 years, 323 days – Gump Worsley (1974)
- 44 years, 99 days – Lester Patrick (1928)^{[5]}
- 44 years, 78 days – Jacques Plante (1973)^{[3]}
- 43 years, 78 days – Dominik Hasek (2008)
- 42 years, 241 days – Martin Brodeur (2015)
- 42 years, 194 days – David Ayres (2020)
- 42 years, 178 days – Dwayne Roloson (2012)
- 42 years, 136 days – Eddie Johnston (1978)
- 42 years, 91 days – Hughie Lehman (1928)
- 41 years, 350 days – Ed Belfour (2007)
- 41 years, 344 days – Curtis Joseph (2009)
- 41 years, 327 days – Craig Anderson (2023)
- 41 years, 177 days – George Hainsworth (1937)
- 40 years, 307 days – Nikolai Khabibulin (2013)
- 40 years, 295 days – Ryan Miller (2021)
- 40 years, 288 days – Tony Esposito (1984)
- 40 years, 153 days – Marc-Andre Fleury (2025)
- 40 years, 107 days – Terry Sawchuk (1970)
- 40 years, 82 days – Jonathan Quick (2026)
- 40 years, 76 days – Mike Smith (2022)
- 40 years, 66 days – Sean Burke (2007)
- 40 years, 32 days – Hap Holmes (1928)
- 40 years, 10 days – Tim Thomas (2014)
- 40 years, 3 days – Roberto Luongo (2019)

=== Skaters ===
==== 41–52 years ====
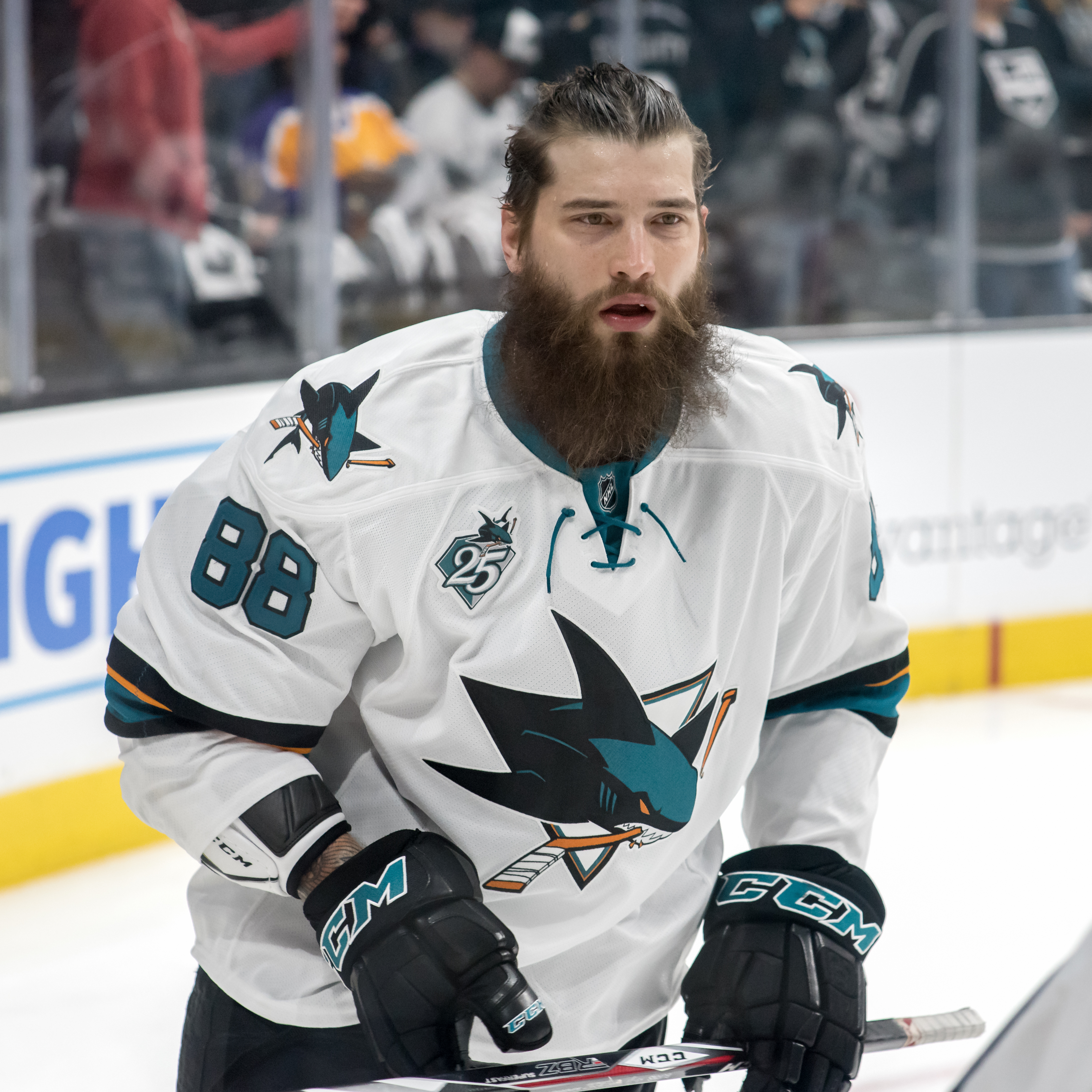
Brent Burns has been the oldest active player in the NHL since 2025

- 52 years, 11 days – Gordie Howe (1980)^{[1]}
- 48 years, 71 days – Chris Chelios (2010)
- 45 years, 319 days – Jaromir Jagr (2017)
- 45 years, 42 days – Zdeno Chara (2022)
- 44 years, 100 days – Doug Harvey (1969)
- 44 years, 39 days – Tim Horton (1974)
- 43 years, 317 days – Teemu Selanne (2014)
- 43 years, 277 days – Claude Lemieux (2009)
- 43 years, 134 days – Mark Recchi (2011)
- 43 years, 129 days – Igor Larionov (2004)
- 43 years, 73 days – Mark Messier (2004)
- 43 years, 35 days – Allan Stanley (1969)
- 42 years, 332 days – Johnny Bucyk (1978)
- 42 years, 325 days – Joe Thornton (2022)
- 42 years, 282 days – Gary Roberts (2009)
- 42 years, 155 days – Matt Cullen (2019)
- 42 years, 126 days – Frank Boucher (1944)
- 42 years, 100 days – Dave Andreychuk (2006)
- 42 years, 13 days – Dave Keon (1982)
- 41 years, 358 days – Tommy Albelin (2006)
- 41 years, 357 days – Nicklas Lidstrom (2012)
- 41 years, 352 days – Ray Whitney (2014)
- 41 years, 335 days – Alex Delvecchio (1973)
- 41 years, 242 days – Patrick Marleau (2021)
- 41 years, 220 days – Adam Oates (2004)
- 41 years, 199 days – Brent Burns (Present)
- 41 years, 156 days – Carl Brewer (1980)
- 41 years, 136 days – Daniel Alfredsson (2014)
- 41 years, 131 days – Corey Perry (Present)
- 41 years, 114 days – Doug Mohns (1975)
- 41 years, 98 days – Bobby Hull (1980)
- 41 years, 84 days – Dean Prentice (1973)
- 41 years, 66 days – Brett Hull (2005)
- 41 years, 62 days – Ron Francis (2004)
- 41 years, 53 days – Terry Harper (1981)
- 41 years, 7 days – Alexander Ovechkin (Present)

==== 40 years ====
- 40 years, 357 days – Steve Yzerman (2006)
- 40 years, 355 days – Sergei Gonchar (2015)
- 40 years, 337 days – Mike Modano (2011)
- 40 years, 323 days – Larry Robinson (1992)
- 40 years, 319 days – Mathieu Schneider (2010)
- 40 years, 311 days – Scott Mellanby (2007)
- 40 years, 297 days – Mike Knuble (2013)
- 40 years, 294 days – James Patrick (2004)
- 40 years, 293 days – Steve Thomas (2004)
- 40 years, 283 days – George Armstrong (1971)
- 40 years, 282 days – Teppo Numminen (2009)
- 40 years, 243 days – Ron Stewart (1973)
- 40 years, 190 days – Larry Zeidel (1969)
- 40 years, 190 days – Jean Ratelle (1981)
- 40 years, 189 days – Sean O'Donnell (2012)
- 40 years, 180 days – Kjell Samuelsson (1999)
- 40 years, 180 days – Shane Doan (2017)
- 40 years, 177 days – Mark Giordano (2024)
- 40 years, 164 days – Rob Blake (2010)
- 40 years, 163 days – Bill Cook (1937)
- 40 years, 163 days – Ray Bourque (2001)
- 40 years, 142 days – Grant Ledyard (2002)
- 40 years, 103 days – Ryan Suter (2025)
- 40 years, 97 days – Al MacInnis (2003)
- 40 years, 95 days – Brendan Shanahan (2009)
- 40 years, 92 days – Harry Howell (1973)^{[2]}
- 40 years, 90 days – Kimmo Timonen (2015)
- 40 years, 79 days – Joe Nieuwendyk (2006)
- 40 years, 72 days – Mario Lemieux (2005)
- 40 years, 68 days – Guy Carbonneau (2000)
- 40 years, 59 days – Luc Robitaille (2006)
- 40 years, 57 days – Viacheslav Fetisov (1998)
- 40 years, 56 days – Joe Mullen (1997)
- 40 years, 55 days – Evgeni Malkin (Present)
- 40 years, 46 days – Larry Murphy (2001)
- 40 years, 45 days – Ken Schinkel (1973)
- 40 years, 40 days – Noel Price (1976)
- 40 years, 23 days – Mark Howe (1995)
- 40 years, 19 days – Don Marshall (1972)
- 40 years, 3 days – Dit Clapper (1947)

== Notes ==
1.Gordie Howe first retired at 43 years old in 1971. He took a two year hiatus and returned to hockey in the World Hockey Association with the Houston Aeros, then returned to the NHL with the Hartford Whalers for his final full pro season in 1979–80. In 1997, Howe returned at 69 years old playing one game (one shift) in the IHL with the Detroit Vipers.
2.Harry Howell finished his career in World Hockey Association in 1976 at 43 years old.
3.Jacques Plante finished his career in the World Hockey Association during the 1974–75 season with Edmonton Oilers retiring at 46 years old. Plante became the oldest goaltender in the WHA.
4.Maurice "Moe" Roberts became the oldest goaltender in the NHL. At that time he was the assistant trainer with the Chicago Black Hawks and replaced an injured Harry Lumley in the third period.
5.Lester Patrick replaced an injured Lorne Chabot in the second period. Patrick was the general manager and coach of the New York Rangers at the time. Patrick remains the oldest goalie to play in a Stanley Cup Finals.

== See also ==
- List_of_NHL_records_(individual)#Age
- List of oldest professional athletes by sport
- List of oldest and youngest National Basketball Association players
- List of oldest Major League Baseball players
