= Lamberto Boranga =

Italian athlete

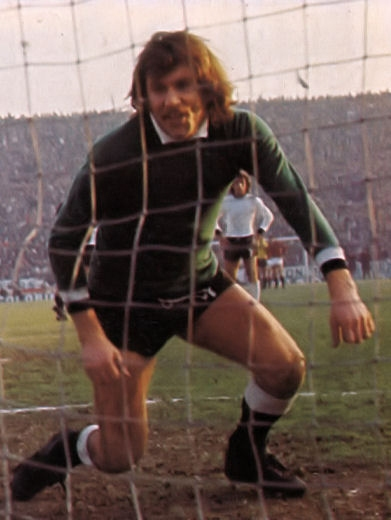
- Lamberto Boranga as goalkeeper, with Cesena jersey in the 1970s

Personal information
- Full name: Lamberto Boranga
- Date of birth: 30 October 1942 (age 84)
- Place of birth: Foligno, Italy
- Position: Goalkeeper

Team information
- Current team: Trevana

Senior career*
Years	Team	Apps	(Gls)
1961–1966	Perugia	133	(0)
1966–1967	Fiorentina	6	(0)
1967–1969	Reggiana	54	(0)
1969–1970	→ Brescia (loan)	14	(0)
1970–1973	Reggiana	109	(0)
1973–1977	Cesena	92	(0)
1977–1978	Varese	18	(0)
1978–1980	Parma	15	(0)
1980–1983	Foligno	7	(0)
1992–1993	Bastardo	1	(0)
2009–2010	Ammeto	4	(0)
2011–2015	Papiano	49	(0)
2018–2019	Marottese	1	(0)
2025–	Trevana	0	(0)
- Sports career
- Height: 1.80 m (5 ft 11 in)
- Weight: 78 kg (172 lb)
- Country: Italy
- Sport: Masters athletics
- Event: Triple jump
- Club: Olimpia Amatori Rimini
Sports achievements and titles
- Personal bests: Triple jump M65: 11.40 m (2007); Triple jump M70: 10.75 m (2012); Long jump M65: 5.47 m (2008)
Medal record
Event	1st	2nd	3rd
World Championships	1	1	1
World Indoor Championships	1	1	0
European Championships	2	2	1
World Masters Championships
Gold medal – first place	2018 Malaga	High jump M75
- * Club domestic league appearances and goals

Lamberto Boranga (born 30 October 1942 in Foligno) is an Italian high, long and triple jumper (masters athletics), and footballer who plays as a goalkeeper for Prima Categoria club Trevana. He is currently the oldest active football player in the world.

== Career ==
=== Football career ===
Boranga made 112 appearances in Serie A, with Fiorentina (6 in the 1966–67 season), Brescia (14 in the 1969–70 season) and Cesena (92 in four seasons from 1973 to 1977), before playing in the lower divisions until 1984.

Boranga then graduated in medicine and while employed as a physician for Bastardo he played one match for the team. While competing in master athletics, he resumed playing amateur football in 2009, retiring in 2020 at the record age of 77 years and 7 months.

In August 2025, Boranga announced he would be coming out of retirement, at the age of 82, to play for Prima Categoria side Trevana in October, whilst also competing in the European Masters Athletics Championships in the same month.

=== Athletics career ===
In 2012 he set the world record master in triple jump, with a distance of 10.75, in the M70 category. He is also the holder of the world record M65 in the long jump (5.47 m).

== World records ==
=== Athletics ===
- Triple jump M70: 10.75 m ( (San Marino) Serravalle, 3 November 2012)
- Long jump M65: 5.47 m ( (Slovenia) Ljubljana, 27 July 2008)

=== Football ===
- Oldest active football player in the world, since 2025.

== Achievements ==
He won ten medals in eleven events at the International Championships (World and European).

Year	Competition	Venue	Position	Event	Category	Measure	Notes
2006	World Masters Indoor Championships	(Austria) Linz	5th	Long jump	M60	5.13 m	
2007	World Masters Championships	(Italy) Riccione	2nd	Triple jump	M60	11.40 m	
2008	World Masters Indoor Championships	(France) Clermont	1st	Long jump	M65	5.22 m	
2008	World Masters Indoor Championships	(France) Clermont	2nd	Triple jump	M65	11.26 m	
2008	European Masters Championships	(Slovenia) Ljubljana	1st	Long jump	M65	5.47 m	
2009	World Masters Championships	(Finland) Lahti	1st	Long jump	M65	5.03 m	
2010	European Masters Championships	(Hungary) Nyíregyháza	3rd	High jump	M65	1.40 m	
2010	European Masters Championships	(Hungary) Nyíregyháza	2nd	Long jump	M65	5.08 m	
2011	World Masters Championships	(United States) Sacramento	3rd	High jump	M65	1.52 m	
2012	European Masters Championships	(Germany) Zittau	1st	High jump	M65	1.54 m	
2012	European Masters Championships	(Germany) Zittau	2nd	Long jump	M65	5.05 m	

== See also ==
- List of world records in masters athletics
