= FC Real Pharma Odesa =

Real Pharma
- Full name: FC Real Pharma Odesa
- Founded: 2000 (original team); 2010 (new ownership)
- Ground: Ivan
- Capacity: 1,200
- Chairman: Mykola Lykhovydov
- Manager: Ivan Hetsko
- League: Amateurs
- 2025–26: Ukrainian Second League, Group "A", 11th of 11 (relegated)
- Website: real-farma.com.ua
Home colours	Away colours	Third colours

FC Real Pharma Odesa is a professional Ukrainian football club from the city of Odesa. The "Pharma" portion of the name comes from pharmaceutical influences that are associated with the club's ownership as evident on the original logo which is in English rather than Ukrainian.

The team is currently playing Ukrainian Second League after competing in the Ukrainian Amateur championship. The club was formed in 2000.

== History ==
The team was founded in 2000 as Limed Pokrovske and until 2011 played in Odesa. Since 2005 the club was known as Real-Pharm. In 2010 the club was passed onto Mykola Lykhovydov who became the club's president and playing manager. Until 2011 the club participated in football competitions of Odesa Oblast. In March 2011 Real Pharm was registered as a professional club and lost the hyphen in its name. It also joined competitions of the national amateur league, the early stages of the 2011 season.

"Real Pharm" debut in the Ukrainian Second League in the 2011–12 season.

In 2013, the club moved their operations from Yuzhne to Ovidiopol and prior to the 2013–14 Ukrainian Second League season renamed the team to Real Pharma Ovidiopol.

The club moved their operations to Odesa prior to the start of the 2015–16 season.

On 14 June 2026, it was announced that club withdraws from professional competition and the next season will participate in the amateur competitions.

=== Home stadiums ===
- 2011–2013 Spartak Stadium, Odesa
- 2013–2015 Dukov Dnister Stadium, Ovidiopol
- 2015–2016 Ivan Stadium, Odesa
- 2016– present Spartak Stadium, Odesa

=== Emblems ===
Emblem 2011–2013
Based in Yuzhne

Emblem 2013–15
Based in Ovidiopol

Emblem 2015–17

== Players ==
As of 6 May 2026

Note: Flags indicate national team as defined under FIFA eligibility rules; some limited exceptions apply. Players may hold more than one non-FIFA nationality.

No.	Pos.	Nation	Player
1	GK	UKR	Maksym Pohorodetskyi
2	DF	UKR	Nikita Buryachenko
3	DF	UKR	Vladyslav Mudrak
4	DF	UKR	Oleksandr Mulyk
5	DF	UKR	Nazar Zaychenko
7	MF	UKR	Mykola Lykhovydov
8	MF	UKR	Ivan Onyshchak
9	MF	UKR	Oleksandr Cholovskyi
10	MF	UKR	Serhiy Palamarchuk
12	GK	UKR	Vadym Dmytrochenko
14	DF	UKR	Eduard Shykhalyeyev
15	DF	UKR	Artem Zelenskyi
16	MF	UKR	Oleksandr Fomychov

No.	Pos.	Nation	Player
17	MF	UKR	Andriy Varenyk
18	DF	UKR	Denis Proskurnya
22	MF	UKR	Petro Bychok
23	GK	UKR	Daniil Nikolenko
24	DF	UKR	Eldar Yuranov
25	FW	UKR	Sava Slavynskyi
26	MF	UKR	Dmytro Fabrika
27	MF	UKR	Andriy Mikhnenko
28	FW	UKR	Artem Makarenko
33	MF	UKR	Nikita Shcherbak
44	MF	UKR	Maksym Marchenko (captain)
78	FW	UKR	Maksym Shchekotylin
99	DF	UKR	Artyemiy Sharnin

== League and cup history ==
Season	Div.	Pos.	Pl.	W	D	L	GS	GA	P	Domestic Cup	Europe	Notes
2011	4th "3"	2_{/6}	10	7	1	2	21	11	22			Admitted to Second League
2011–12	3rd "A"	7_{/14}	26	9	6	11	28	41	33	1/64 finals		
2012–13	3rd "A"	6_{/11}	20	8	6	6	23	25	30	1/64 finals		
2012–13	3rd "1"	6_{/6}	10	1	3	6	12	24	6	1/64 finals		Promotion stage
2013–14	3rd	12_{/19}	36	14	5	17	30	57	47	1/32 finals		
2014–15	3rd	4_{/10}	27	11	9	7	40	29	42	1/16 finals		
2015–16	3rd	7_{/14}	26	12	5	9	31	29	41	1/32 finals		
2016–17	3rd	5_{/17}	32	16	9	7	50	31	57	1/16 finals		
2017–18	3rd "B"	6_{/12}	33	15	7	11	54	40	52	1/64 finals		
2018–19	3rd "B"	8_{/10}	27	5	8	14	23	50	23	1/64 finals		
2019–20	3rd "B"	9_{/11}	20	4	4	12	10	38	16	1/64 finals		season shortened due to outbreak of COVID-19
2020-21	2nd "B"	10 _{/13}	22	5	3	14	13	40	18	1/64 finals		
2021-22	2nd "B"	14 _{/16}	20	4	2	14	22	49	14	1/64 finals		domestic league and cup competitions were terminated due to war
2022-23	2nd	6 _{/10}	18	9	3	6	27	23	30	no competition due to war		
2023-24	2nd	12 _{/15}	26	5	4	17	17	51	19	1/64 finals		
2024-25	2nd "А"	10 _{/10}	18	2	3	13	9	40	9	1/64 finals		
2025-26	2nd "А"	11 _{/11}	30	1	4	25	18	96	7	1/32 finals		relegated to amateurs

== Managers ==
- 2000–2000 Mykola Lykhovydov
- 2001–2003 Mykola Lykhovydov & Serhiy Irichenko
- 2004–2005 Vasyl Mokan
- 2006–2006 Mykola Lykhovydov
- 2006–2008 Oleksandr Bondarenko
- 2009–2012 Mykola Lykhovydov
- 2013–2014 Ihor Korniyets
- 2014–2016 Vladyslav Zubkov
- 2016–2017 Oleksandr Bondarenko (acting)
- 2017–2019 Andriy Kovalenko
- 2019–2020 Oleksandr Spitsyn
- 2020–2022 Artem Riazantsev
- 2022 Yuriy Kulish
- 2022–2024 Andriy Parkhomenko
- 2024–2026 Valentyn Poltavets
- 2026– Ivan Hetsko
