= Mathieu Enguérran Edjekpan =

Beninese footballer

Angueran Edjekpan
Personal information
- Full name: Mathieu Enguérand Edjekpan Guerin
- Date of birth: 15 January 1985 (age 41)
- Place of birth: Porto-Novo, Benin
- Height: 1.84 m (6 ft 0 in)
- Position: Defender

Youth career
- 2003–2004: Saint-Étienne

Senior career*
Years	Team	Apps	(Gls)
2004–2005	Urbino	28	(0)
2005–2007	Grottaglie	50	(2)
2007–2011	Mesagne		
2011–2013	Delfini Rossoblu Crispiano		
2013–2014	Massafra Calcio		

International career
1998–2002	Benin	3	(0)
- * Club domestic league appearances and goals

Mathieu Enguérand Edjekpan Guerin (born 15 January 1985) is a Beninese former professional footballer who played as a defender for lower-league clubs in Italy. In 2001 and 2002 he made two appearances for the Benin national team.

== Club career ==
Edjekpan was born in Porto-Novo, Benin. He began his career 2003 in the youth from AS Saint-Étienne. A year later, he moved to Italy.

Edjekpan began now his professional career with Urbino playing 28 of 34 matches in the 2004–05 season. He signed for Grottaglie in July 2005 where he made 50 appearances scoring two goals before joining to Mesagne in summer 2007.

== International career ==
According to National Football Teams, Edjekpan is the youngest ever international footballer. Their records say that he played in a 2–0 loss to Angola in August 1998. He would have been 13 years and 213 days old at the time of his debut. However, RSSSF dispute the verifiability of this. He was called up again after a six-year absence for Benin in 2008.
