= Isaak Hayik =

Iraqi-born Israeli footballer

- יצחק חייק
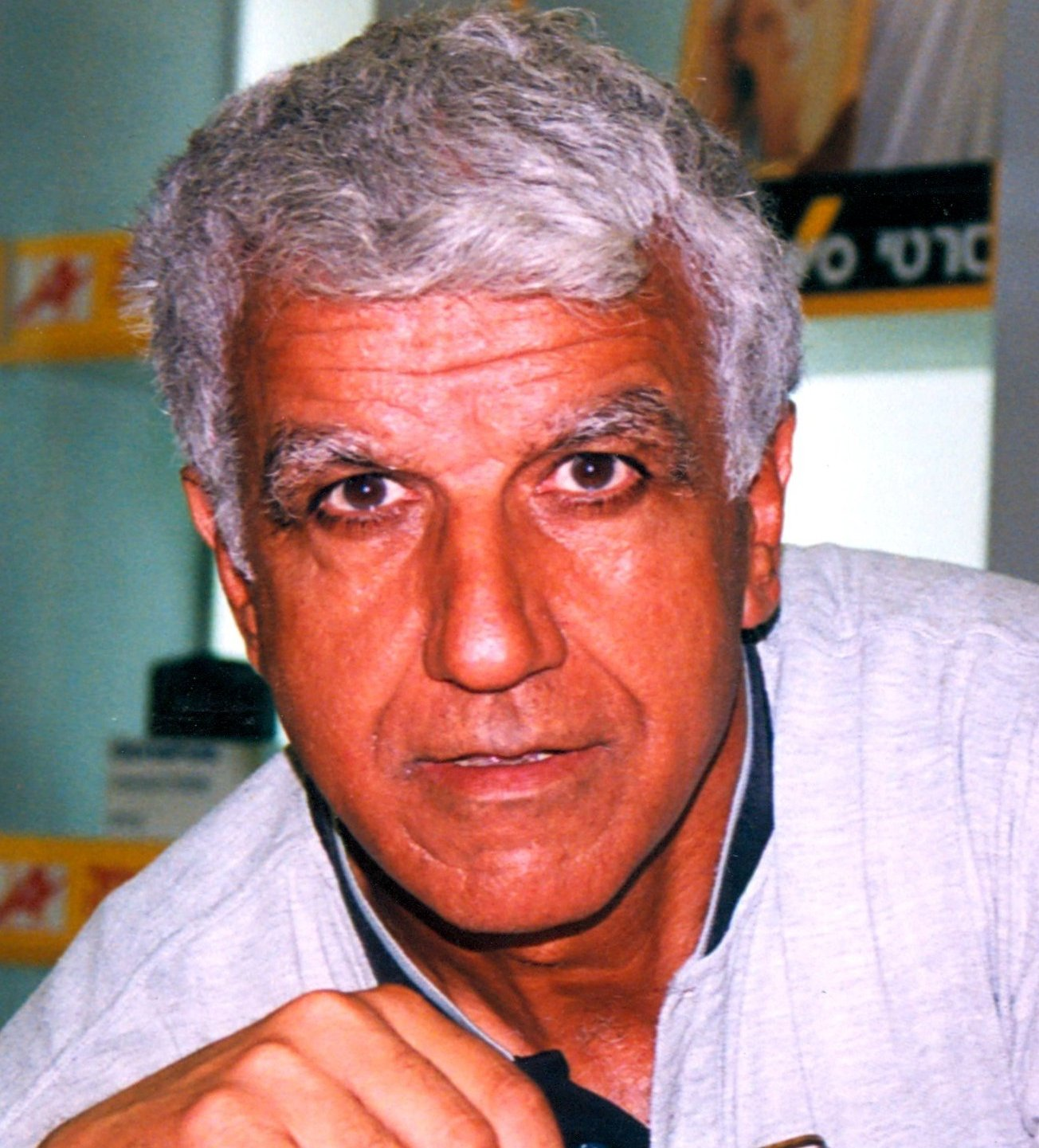
- Born: April 13, 1945 (age 81); Iraq
- Occupations: Business, creative, education, and football professional
- Known for: Hayik Bamot, Ironi Or Yehuda, Guinness Book of Records, The Next War
- Children: 3
- Relatives: Mordechai Ben-Porat (father-in-law), Shaul Hayik (brother)

Isaak Hayik (Hebrew: יצחק חייק; born 13 April 1945) is an Israeli entrepreneur, author, illustrator, and footballer. He became the world's oldest professional football player when he played for Ironi Or Yehuda as a goalkeeper at the age of 73.

== Early life and family ==
Hayik was born in an affluent Jewish family in Iraq. His father, Moshe Hayik, was a physician. At the beginning of 1951, when Isaac was five years old, the Hayik family immigrated to Israel. They settled in the transit camp (slums) of Or Yehuda. Since then, Isaac has been inseparable from Or Yehuda. Isaac Hayik married Idit, the daughter of Mordechai Ben-Porat, mayor of Or Yehuda and later Knesset Member and government minister. Idit and Isaac Hayik have three children. Isaac's younger brother, Shaul, became a successful footballer. Isaac Hayik was a player for Hakoah Maccabi Ramat Gan, when it won the 1968–1969 Israel State Cup. He studied education and history.

== Author, illustrator, and youth counselor ==
Hayik engaged in graphical design and became the caricaturist of the daily newspapers Hadshot HaSport in Hebrew and Al-Yaum in Arabic. He also illustrated several books.

He wrote his first book, The Next War (Ramdor, 1968), when he was only 23. The book was written in the euphoric Israeli period after the Six Day War and described the attack on Israel prepared by Soviet-backed Arab armies, and the IDF victory over its enemies. It was originally published in chapters in the Israeli newspaper of record, Haaretz. His second book, The End of the Earth (Ramdor, 1969), was a science fiction book that described a worldwide war and the extermination of most of humanity, with aliens also joining it towards the end of the war. His third book, Our Woman in Moscow (Chechik, 1970), described the activities of the Mossad in the Soviet Union.

Alongside, from 1965 to 1980, he worked as a youth counselor in Or Yehuda.

== Business career ==
In 1980 Hayik founded Hayik Bamot, a company that became the largest supplier in Israel for stages, decors and props for events, shows, rallies and ceremonies. In response to the refusal of several actors and theater companies to perform at the Ariel Center for the Performing Arts in the Israeli West Bank settlement of Ariel, he announced that his company would no longer provide stages and decors for theaters which refused to perform at the Ariel theater.

== Football career ==
Hayik served as the manager of Maccabi Or Yehuda team in the third division and played as a goalkeeper for the Elitzur Yehud team. As of 2019, he serves as the goalkeeper of Maccabi Or Yehuda and is the oldest goalkeeper in the country. In April 2019 he entered the Guinness Book of Records as the oldest football player of all time, at the age of 73.
