= Robert Carmona =

Uruguayan footballer (born 1962)

Personal information
- Full name: Roberto Carmona
- Date of birth: 30 April 1962 (age 64)
- Place of birth: Montevideo, Uruguay
- Positions: Centre-back; midfielder

Team information
- Current team: Juventud Melilla

Youth career
- 1967–: Unidad Buceo
- Los Charrúas
- Estrella del Norte
- Colombes
- Peñarol
- –1975: Pan de Azúcar

Senior career*
Years	Team	Apps	(Gls)
1976–1977	Dr Pouey Las Piedras		
1978–1983	Pan de Azúcar		
1978–1983	Selección Juvenil Maldonado		
1980	Liverpool Montevideo		
1981	Progreso		
1982	Bella Vista		
1983	Tristán Suárez		
1984	La Luz		
1985	Colón Montevideo		
1986	Alto Perú		
1987–1988	Juvenil Platense de Nueva York		
1989	Nacional Ecuatoriano New Jersey		
1990	Costa Rica NJ		
1991	Guadalajara NJ		
1992	Uruguay NJ		
1992	Boys Club NJ		
1992–1999	Municipal Limeño		
1993	Imperiales NJ		
1993	River Plate Asuncion		
1993–1994	Central Molino de Maldonado		
1994	Uruguay Charrúa NJ		
1995	5 Estrellas Orlando		
1995–1996	Philadelphia KiXX		
1996	Uruguay Jersey NJ		
1997	Peñarol de Young		
1998	Internacional NJ		
1999	River Plate Philadelphia		
2000	El Salvador Richmond, Virginia		
2001	Covinalpa Senior		
2001	Selección Senior Mercedes		
2002	Deportivo Colonia		
2002	Uruguay Bellaco, Río Negro		
2002–2003	Sud América de Young Senior		
2004	Ferrocarril Senior de Young		
2004	Selección Río Negro Young Senior		
2004–2006	Albion		
2005	Unión Young Senior		
2006–2007	Platense Montevideo		
2007–2008	Albion		
2008–2009	Basáñez		
2008–2009	Albion	7	(1)
2009–2018	La Luz		
2010–2021	Albion		
2012	Mar de Fondo		
2013	Colón Montevideo		
2014	Platense Montevideo		
2015	Pan de Azúcar		
2016	Canadian		
2017	Inter Ibiza		
2017	Audax Orione		
2018	Río de la Plata		
2019	Moncada		
2020	Villa Nelly Unido La Paz, Canelones		
2021	Chacarita Urumex		
2021–2023	Hacele Un Gol a la Vida		
2023–2024	Iraklis de Alicante		
2024	Río de la Plata		
2024–2025	Nuevo Casabó		
2025	Estudiantes El Colla		
2025–2026	Liffa Club		
2026–	Juventud Melilla		

Managerial career
- 2005–2011: Albion
- * Club domestic league appearances and goals

Robert Carmona (born 30 April 1962) is a Uruguayan footballer who plays as a midfielder for Canelones league club Juventud Melilla.

Carmona, 64, holds the Guinness World Record for being the oldest active professional football player, the record of the footballer to play in the most different decades, with 6, from 1970s to 2020s, and the record for the player who has played for the most clubs (53 different clubs), if amateur clubs are counted. If taking into account only professional clubs, the record holder is Sebastián Abreu, who played in 31 different professional clubs.

Besides Uruguay, Carmona has played in the lower leagues of Canada, United States, Spain, El Salvador, Paraguay, Argentina, and Italy for 30 clubs in total and over 2,200 official matches. In August 2025, he stated that Liffa Club is his 50th or 51st club. In May 2026, he stated that his current team, Juventud Melilla, is his 52nd or 53rd club. (Note: His estimate of being his 53rd club is correct, because it is actually the 53rd different club he plays for.)

== Career ==
Carmona started football at the age of 5, joining the junior section of Unidad Buceo. After playing for several youth teams, in 1976, aged 14, he started his senior career as a playmaker for local club, Dr Pouey Las Piedras. In 1983, at 21, he moved abroad for the first time in his career, playing for Buenos Aires club Tristán Suárez.

In 1984, he signed for Montevideo club, La Luz, and he returned in 2009, a record 25-year long gap between two spells for a team, which held as the world record until 2024, when the record was broken by defender Paulo da Silva from Paraguay.

From 2005 until 2011, he was the player-manager of Albion, the club he has played for the most, during his lengthy career.

He also played indoor soccer in the USA, where he featured for various local teams from 1987 to 2000, primarily around the New York/New Jersey and Philadelphia area. Other clubs outside Uruguay that he has played for are: Municipal Limeño (El Salvador), River Plate Asuncion (Paraguay), Inter Ibiza, Moncada and Iraklis de Alicante (Spain), and Audax Orione (Italy).

Carmona currently holds the Guinness World Record for being the oldest active player. Despite having undergone eight operations due to injuries, his intention is to continue playing football. He stated in May 2026 that he'll continue as long as he can.

== Achievements and milestones ==
Season	Milestone	Notes	Reference
World records
1976–present	Oldest active football player	He was also recognized by the Guinness World Records for holding the longest uninterrupted football career in history.	
1976–present	Footballer played for most clubs	Featured for 53 different teams across his career.	
1976–present	Footballer who has played for most decades	He has featured across 6 different decades (from the 1970s through to the 2020s).	
Uruguayan records
1976–present	Oldest active Uruguayan footballer	Stands as the nation's longevity record-holder.	
1976–present	Most clubs played for in the Uruguayan football	Having played for 32 Uruguayan clubs, he holds the national record for the most appearances in the Uruguayan football.	
Other milestones
1976–present	Player with over 2,200 official career matches recorded	Accumulated across his continuous and uninterrupted 40+ season career playing both domestically and internationally.	
2009	Longest gap between two spells for the same club	He returned to play for La Luz in 2009, after a 25-year absence, as he first played in 1984. Also, held as the world record until 2024, when the record was broken by Paulo da Silva.	

== See also ==
- List of men's footballers with 1,000 or more official appearances
- List of world association football records
- Kazuyoshi Miura
