= Eligibility for the NBA draft =

The NBA draft is a major annual event in which all the 30 franchises in the National Basketball Association select new players for their teams. Eligibility rules for prospective players have changed eight times during the history of the league. No player may sign with the NBA until they are 19 years or older.

== Early history ==
In the earliest days of the NBA, three players entered the NBA without having played in college. However, the league eventually established a rule that "a player could not make himself available" for the draft until four years after his high school graduation.

== Haywood v. NBA ==
The first major challenge to the NBA's eligibility rules came from Spencer Haywood. He graduated from high school in 1967, at a time when college freshmen were disallowed to play varsity sports for NCAA member schools. He played a year at a Colorado junior college, followed by a season at the University of Detroit. After the 1969–70 season, he left college for the NBA's rival at the time, the American Basketball Association (ABA), which offered a hardship exemption for players who were not four years removed from high school. Haywood had a spectacularly successful rookie season with the Denver Rockets (the predecessor to today's Denver Nuggets), being named the ABA's Rookie of the Year and MVP. Near the end of the season, he turned 21; shortly after its end, he repudiated his contract with the Rockets, claiming he had been defrauded. Haywood then signed a contract with the Seattle SuperSonics (later relocated to become the Oklahoma City Thunder), which put him and the Sonics on a collision course with the NBA, as he was only three years removed from his high school graduation.

The NBA threatened to void the contract and impose sanctions against the Sonics. Haywood responded by filing an antitrust suit against the league, seeking an injunction to prevent the NBA from disallowing the contract or punishing the Sonics. The case eventually reached the U.S. Supreme Court, which issued a 7–2 decision in Haywood's favor in 1971.

After the decision, the NBA allowed players to enter early as "hardship cases", which essentially meant that the player had to prove financial hardship. This rule quickly developed into one that was observed in the breach, with Sport magazine writer Jackie Lapin commenting in the 1970s that "Almost anyone who has been any good at the game in the past decade would qualify [as a hardship case]—with the probable exception of Bill Bradley, the banker's son."

== Later history ==
As a consequence of the aforementioned Haywood decision, and following soon after, three high schoolers chose to enter the professional ranks without ever enrolling in a college. In 1975, Darryl Dawkins and Bill Willoughby both went to the NBA from high school. Dawkins had a solid 14-year career in the NBA, while Willoughby played for eight NBA seasons.

While underclass draftees are too numerous to list, it can be noted that among the 50 Greatest Players, 10 left college early for the NBA.

After Dawkins and Willoughby, no high school player went directly to the NBA for 20 years, although Lloyd Daniels and Shawn Kemp went to the NBA without having played college basketball (both had enrolled in college, but never played). That would change in 1995 with the arrival of future NBA MVP Kevin Garnett, who was selected fifth overall. The following year, another future MVP in Kobe Bryant and a future All-Star in Jermaine O'Neal were first-round picks out of high school. Most years after that saw at least one, and often more, high schoolers drafted, most notably Tracy McGrady (1997), Kwame Brown (the first high schooler to be the #1 overall pick, in 2001), Amar'e Stoudemire (2002), LeBron James (#1 in 2003), and Dwight Howard (#1 in 2004).

However, the influx of high schoolers caused considerable controversy. When the NBA and its players union negotiated a new Collective Bargaining Agreement (CBA) in 2005, NBA Commissioner David Stern publicly called for a higher age minimum of 20, stating that he wanted the league's scouts and general managers out of high school gyms and that too many young "urban Americans" incorrectly saw the NBA as a viable path to fame and financial security. Most of the players were opposed to an age minimum; Jermaine O'Neal was perhaps the most strident critic, accusing the NBA of racism. Ultimately, the union reluctantly agreed to an age minimum of 19, accepting it in exchange for tweaks to salary cap rules that were favorable to the players' interests.

The current eligibility rules were established under the NBA's 2005 collective bargaining agreement (CBA), which expired in 2011, resulting in a lockout. The previous CBA, approved in December 2011, made no changes to the draft rules, but called for the NBA and its players union to form a committee to discuss draft-related issues. In 2016, the NBA and NBA Players Association met to work on a new CBA, which both sides approved in December of that year. This most recent agreement started with the 2017–18 season and will run through 2023–24, with a mutual opt-out after 2022–23. The basic rules that started in the 2006 draft are:

- All drafted players must be at least 19 years old during the calendar year of the draft.
- Any player who is not an "international player", as defined in the CBA, must be at least one year removed from the graduation of his high school class.

The "one year out of high school" requirement is in addition to the age requirement. For example, although O. J. Mayo turned 19 in November 2006, six months before his high school graduation, he was not eligible until the 2008 draft, a year after his high school class graduated. Stern stated the rules were business-related and not a "social program", citing the need to see players perform against higher competition before they are evaluated for valuable draft picks. The rule effectively mandated that players spend at least one year in college. High school players who would otherwise have jumped directly into the NBA were instead playing in college for the required year before leaving and entering the draft—a phenomenon known as one and done. The NBA G League (formerly Development League) is one alternative to college. Players can earn five-figure salaries, but the level of competition is possibly lower than in the Division I level in college. Some players, most notably Brandon Jennings, have also played overseas in lieu of college. However, in recent years, other players like Satnam Singh, Thon Maker, and Matur Maker have looked to enter the NBA draft while still being high schoolers by exploiting a loophole where they enter the draft as high school postgraduates. Also since the one-and-done rule began in the 2006 draft, it became more common for high school players to reclassify and graduate a year earlier, allowing them to qualify for the draft sooner.

In April 2018, a report from the Commission on College Basketball was released. It recommended, among its findings, the abolishment of the "one-and-done" rule, thus high school players can be directly eligible for the draft again. The NBA notified its member teams in a memorandum later in June that the earliest possible draft without the one-year rule (not named in the memo), among eligibility changes, was initially in 2021, only to be moved forward in October to 2022. The NBA had looked to revert their ruling from 2005 to change the age minimum back to 18 again with a recent report from February 2019, only to keep the "one-and-done" rule in place by April 2020 because discussions stalled over physical tests (physicals) and medical evaluations.

=== Automatic eligibility ===
Players whose 19th birthday falls during or before the calendar year of the draft, or at least one year removed from the graduation of their high school class, and who do not meet the criteria for "international" players are automatically eligible if they meet any of the following criteria:

- They have completed four years of their college eligibility.
- If they graduated from high school in the U.S., but did not enroll in a U.S. college or university, four years have passed since their high school class graduated.
- They have signed a contract with a professional basketball team outside the NBA, anywhere in the world, and have played under that contract. They also must be released from their contract before they can leave college to go to the NBA

Those who have reached the minimum eligibility age of 19 and meet the criteria for "international" players are automatically eligible if they meet any of the following criteria:

- They are exactly 22 years old during the calendar year of the draft.
- They have signed a contract with a professional basketball team outside the NBA within the United States, and have played under that contract.

=== "Early entry" player ===
Players who are not automatically eligible but wish to be drafted must declare their eligibility no later than 60 days before the draft. After this date, "early entry" players may attend NBA pre-draft camps and individual team workouts to show off their skills and obtain feedback regarding their draft positions. Under the CBA, a player may withdraw his name from consideration from the draft at any time before the final declaration date, which is 10 days before the draft. However, the NCAA adopted a rule that took effect in August 2009 that requires players at its member institutions to withdraw no later than May 8 to retain their college eligibility; the first draft affected by this rule was the 2010 draft. In 2011, the NCAA shortened its timeline for players to withdraw and retain eligibility to one day before the start of the spring signing period for men's basketball, which occurs in April. The NCAA changed its withdrawal rule again in 2016, effective with that year's draft; its withdrawal deadline is now in late May, specifically 10 days after the final day of the annual NBA Draft Combine. Due to disruptions brought about by the COVID-19 pandemic, the NCAA announced that for the 2020 draft, the withdrawal deadline was changed to 10 days after the combine or August 3, whichever comes first.

The NBA announced on February 26, 2021, that for the 2021 draft only, all college players who wish to enter the draft, regardless of class, will be required to declare eligibility. In October 2020, COVID-19 led the NCAA to declare that the 2020–21 season would not be counted against the college eligibility of any basketball player. The exact language of the CBA with regard to automatic eligibility of college seniors is "The player has graduated from a four-year college or university in the United States, and has no remaining intercollegiate basketball eligibility." Due to the NCAA ruling, every college senior in the 2020–21 season had remaining eligibility. The league was required to consult with the players' union and NCAA to determine whether it would require seniors to opt out of the draft (which was implemented by the NFL for its 2021 draft, affected by a similar NCAA ruling for football) or require opt-ins, with the latter option being chosen. Because of uncertainty surrounding dates of the draft and draft combine, the early entry date for the 2021 draft had not been set at that time.

A player who declares for the draft and stays in it loses his college eligibility when he is drafted. He can sign with any agent following an evaluation from the NBA Undergraduate Advisory Committee, and if he ends up undrafted, he has the opportunity to return to his school for at least another year only after terminating all agreements with that agent, effective with the 2019 draft; until 2018, college players lost their eligibility when they signed with their agents and stayed in the draft, only to be left undrafted. Before 2016, the NCAA only allowed a player to enter the draft once without losing eligibility, but current NCAA rules now allow players to declare for and withdraw from multiple drafts while retaining college eligibility. The CBA allows a player to withdraw twice.

=== Definition of international players ===
The CBA defines "international players" for draft purposes as those who meet all of the following criteria:

- Permanently reside outside the U.S. for at least three years before the draft while playing basketball outside the U.S.
- Have never enrolled in a U.S. college or university.
- Did not complete high school in the U.S.

Note that this definition is very different from what the NBA uses in listing "international players" on its team rosters. For that purpose, the league defines an "international player" specifically as one born outside the 50 United States or the District of Columbia, even if that player's parent is a natural-born American. Also of note is that a prospective player's birthplace is not relevant to his definition as an "international player" for draft purposes. By contrast, the WNBA requires that, for purposes of its draft, "international players" be born outside the U.S.

=== Reaction of high school players ===
In the third annual High School Hoops magazine, the players weighed in on the subject of the new rules regarding draft eligibility. Many of them felt that it was unfair. Kansas State freshman Bill Walker, said (as a junior in high school), "I'm against it. I don't see why you have to be 19 to play a game of basketball when you can be 18 and go to war for our country and die. It's ridiculous." Jerryd Bayless said "It's not fair at all. If a tennis player can go pro at 13, I don't understand why a basketball player can't go pro at 18." A possible number one pick out of high school, had the rule not been put in place, was Greg Oden (though he was still picked first in 2007). When asked about the agreement he said "It's unfair, but it's over with now, so there's no reason to complain." In spite of the claims that the rule is unfair, Wayne Ellington of North Carolina, said that "…I also think it's going to help the league a little bit. Some guys who come in, like from this year's draft, it will help." Brandan Wright said that "It may hurt guys who need money, but it will help people grow and develop."

On the specific topic of Oden entering the draft, Jack Keefer, Oden's high school coach at Lawrence North, Indiana, said, "I really think he thought he was going to college. He seems to be more at ease with himself right now. I think the stress came with worrying about the NBA."

=== Alternatives to college basketball ===
While playing college basketball has been the most popular option for players coming out of high school, some have opted for alternative options. Oklahoma City Thunder guard Terrance Ferguson had originally committed to Alabama then Arizona, but then decided to play in Australia for the Adelaide 36ers. He has urged others to do the same, saying: "Most one-and-done players only spend a few months in college. You have to do schoolwork and all this other stuff. You go overseas, you spend the same amount of months, but you’re focusing straight on basketball. I feel like more players should do it." Another argument he made is that he gets paid for playing overseas, while college players don't receive pay, which is one of the biggest issues players have with going to college. Another alternative that can be taken is instead of playing, players may take a year off to train. Recently drafted Portland Trail Blazers guard Anfernee Simons decided to skip out on college altogether, and instead opted to spend a postgraduate year at the IMG Academy. Simons explained his reasoning for skipping college by saying, “I feel like in college you got three classes a day. That’s a big thing — a lot of time. That’s basically time that I was able to spend in the gym getting better.” In 2020 the NBA created the NBA G League Ignite team made of up of prospects and veteran players and touted it as an alternative to playing college basketball with potential prospects on the team earning salaries of up to $500,000, though it would last as an option until 2024. In 2021, Overtime Elite was formed with a similar purpose for 16-to-20-year-olds, building upon a predecessor league created in 2018 called the Junior Basketball Association.

=== Changes for college underclassmen in 2016 ===
In March 2015, following a series of meetings that began at the 2014 men's Final Four, the NBA, NCAA, and the trade association for college men's coaches, the National Association of Basketball Coaches (NABC), announced a plan that would give college underclassmen a better opportunity to make an informed decision about their NBA status than the then-current system. Under this plan:

- The NCAA would no longer automatically treat entry into the draft as forfeiture of remaining college eligibility. Instead, it would allow underclassmen to withdraw from the draft in late May, about five weeks after the then-current deadline, and retain their remaining eligibility (as long as they do not sign with an agent or a professional basketball team in the meantime). The NBA's early-entry and withdrawal deadlines, respectively 60 days and 10 days before the draft, would not change because they are written into the league's collective bargaining agreement.
- The NBA would expand its invitation-only draft combine, currently held in Chicago, to include players with remaining college eligibility (who would also have to be invited in order to attend). The stated purpose of this expansion was to allow underclassmen to receive feedback from NBA teams on their draft prospects. According to one NCAA executive, the expanded combine would involve from 20 to 30% more players than the approximately 70 who participated at that time.

The NCAA rule change was formally presented by the NCAA men's basketball oversight committee on June 24, 2015, and was approved by the NCAA Division I council on January 13, 2016. The new rule, which took effect with the 2016 draft, specifically sets the new withdrawal date at 10 days after the end of the NBA draft combine. Additionally, players may declare for the draft multiple times without losing college eligibility, as long as they withdraw before the new deadline without hiring an agent or signing a professional basketball contract, and are now allowed to attend the draft combine and one tryout per year for each NBA team without losing college eligibility. However, it has been stated that current commissioner Adam Silver has been working to change this rule and meeting with NCAA officials to make the changes for the betterment of the NBA and NCAA basketball players, teams, and coaches alike.
