= Bill Willoughby =

American basketball player (born 1975)

Personal information
- Born: May 20, 1957 (age 69) Englewood, New Jersey, U.S.
- Listed height: 6 ft 8 in (2.03 m)
- Listed weight: 205 lb (93 kg)

Career information
- High school: Dwight Morrow (Englewood, New Jersey)
- NBA draft: 1975: 2nd round, 19th overall pick
- Drafted by: Atlanta Hawks
- Playing career: 1975–1984
- Position: Small forward
- Number: 32, 33, 34

Career history
- 1975–1977: Atlanta Hawks
- 1977–1978: Buffalo Braves
- 1979–1980: Cleveland Cavaliers
- 1980–1982: Houston Rockets
- 1982–1983: San Antonio Spurs
- 1983–1984: New Jersey Nets

Career highlights
- First-team Parade All-American (1975)

Career statistics
- Points: 2,930 (6.0 ppg)
- Rebounds: 1,891 (3.9 rpg)
- Assists: 413 (0.8 apg)
- Stats at NBA.com
- Stats at Basketball Reference

William Wesley Willoughby (born May 20, 1957) is an American former professional basketball player born in Englewood, New Jersey. After graduating from Dwight Morrow High School in Englewood, he was selected by the Atlanta Hawks in the 1975 NBA draft as the first pick in the second round (19th overall), bypassing college for a chance to play professionally. For his 1975–76 NBA season, he is the seventh youngest player ever to play an NBA game; he was the third youngest at the time, behind Jim Browne and Stan Brown.

== Playing career ==
While fellow notably young draftees Moses Malone (drafted into the American Basketball Association out of high school in 1974, prior to the 1976 ABA–NBA merger) and Darryl Dawkins enjoyed more successful professional careers, Willoughby had a career that was less distinguished. Nicknamed "Poodle" and “Son of Flubber”, he was a journeyman who played for six different NBA teams in eight years. Willoughby was tremendously athletic, having a 47-inch vertical leap. He had played center throughout his high school career, and was forced to play forward in the pros. On February 4, 1981, Willoughby scored a career high 21 points in a win against Dallas. After that season, Willoughby gained some fame in the 1981 NBA postseason by becoming one of the few players ever to block Kareem Abdul-Jabbar's "skyhook" at its apex. Willoughby and the Rockets later advanced to that year's 1981 NBA Finals, where he would play a key role in Houston's Game 2 92–90 win by scoring 14 points off the bench. Houston would go on to lose the series in six games. His professional playing career ended with the New Jersey Nets in 1984, at the age of 26.

== Post-playing career ==
Though he later regretted skipping college, Willoughby eventually received his degree in communications from Fairleigh Dickinson University in 2001, at the age of 44. The NBA fully paid all of his college expenses, and, in return, Willoughby is a special advisor to the NBA who counsels high school players considering forsaking college basketball for the NBA.

Willoughby currently resides in Hackensack, New Jersey.

== NBA career statistics ==
Legend
| GP | Games played | GS | Games started | MPG | Minutes per game |
| FG% | Field goal percentage | 3P% | 3-point field goal percentage | FT% | Free throw percentage |
| RPG | Rebounds per game | APG | Assists per game | SPG | Steals per game |
| BPG | Blocks per game | PPG | Points per game | **Bold** | Career high |

=== Regular season ===
| Year | Team | GP | GS | MPG | FG% | 3P% | FT% | RPG | APG | SPG | BPG | PPG |
|---|---|---|---|---|---|---|---|---|---|---|---|---|
| 1975–76 | Atlanta | 62 | — | 14.0 | .398 | — | .660 | **4.6** | .5 | **.6** | .5 | 4.7 |
| 1976–77 | Atlanta | 39 | — | 14.1 | .444 | — | .683 | 4.4 | .3 | .5 | .6 | 4.9 |
| 1977–78 | Buffalo | 56 | — | 19.3 | .430 | — | .800 | 3.9 | .7 | .4 | .8 | 6.7 |
| 1979–80 | Cleveland | **78** | — | 18.6 | .479 | .111 | .756 | 4.2 | .9 | .4 | .8 | 6.9 |
| 1980–81 | Houston | 55 | — | 20.8 | **.523** | — | .766 | 4.1 | **1.2** | .3 | .6 | 6.3 |
| 1981–82 | Houston | 69 | **42** | **21.4** | .517 | .429 | .727 | 3.8 | 1.1 | .4 | **.9** | **7.8** |
| 1982–83 | San Antonio | 52 | 0 | 20.4 | .461 | **.462** | .774 | 3.7 | 1.1 | .5 | .3 | 6.1 |
| 1982–83 | New Jersey | 10 | 0 | 8.4 | .379 | .000 | **1.000** | 1.1 | .8 | .1 | .1 | 2.4 |
| 1983–84 | New Jersey | 67 | 2 | 14.0 | .481 | .000 | .873 | 2.9 | .8 | .3 | .4 | 4.5 |
| Career | | 488 | — | 17.7 | .470 | .270 | .750 | 3.9 | .8 | .4 | .6 | 6.0 |

=== Playoffs ===
| Year | Team | GP | GS | MPG | FG% | 3P% | FT% | RPG | APG | SPG | BPG | PPG |
|---|---|---|---|---|---|---|---|---|---|---|---|---|
| 1982 | Houston | **19** | — | **21.9** | .362 | .000 | .750 | **4.5** | **1.2** | **.7** | **1.0** | **6.0** |
| 1981 | Houston | 2 | — | 8.5 | **.500** | — | **1.000** | 3.0 | .5 | .0 | .0 | 2.0 |
| 1984 | Nets | 3 | — | 4.3 | .333 | — | — | 1.0 | .0 | .0 | .0 | .7 |
| Career | | 24 | — | 18.6 | .364 | .000 | .762 | 3.9 | 1.0 | .6 | .8 | 5.0 |

== See also ==
- List of oldest and youngest NBA players
