= Early entry =

Early entry may refer to:

- NBA early entry, applying early for the National Basketball Association draft
- NFL early entry, applying early for the National Football League draft
