= Andrew Bynum =

American basketball player (born 1987)

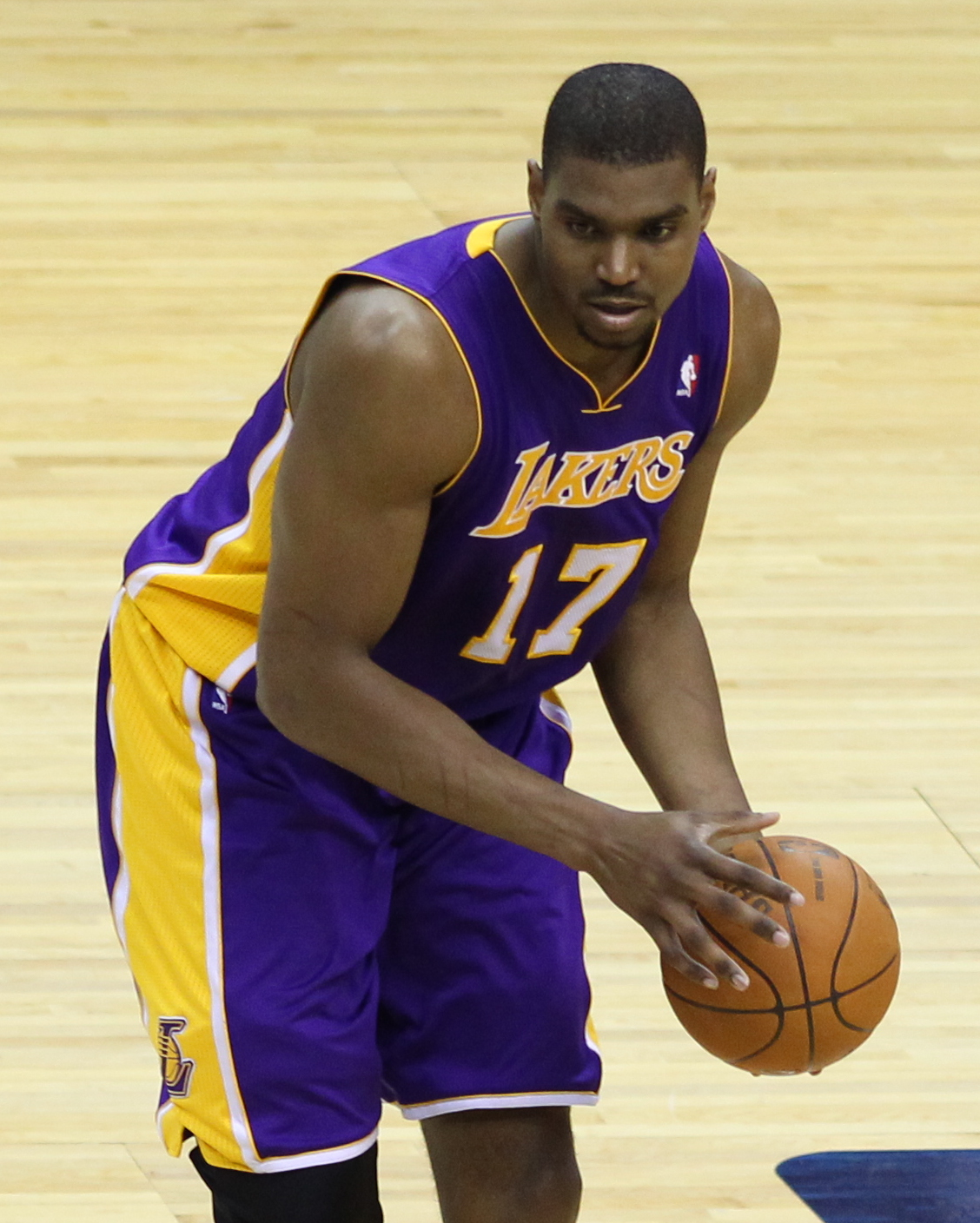
- Bynum with the Los Angeles Lakers in 2012

Personal information
- Born: October 27, 1987 (age 39) Plainsboro Township, New Jersey, U.S.
- Listed height: 7 ft 0 in (2.13 m) (Note: Andrew Bynum has reportedly claimed that he is 7 ft 0 3/4 in (2.15 m) barefoot and 7 ft 2 in (2.18 m) in shoes.)
- Listed weight: 285 lb (129 kg)

Career information
- High school: St. Joseph (Metuchen, New Jersey)
- NBA draft: 2005: 1st round, 10th overall pick
- Drafted by: Los Angeles Lakers
- Playing career: 2005–2014
- Position: Center
- Number: 17, 21

Career history
- 2005–2012: Los Angeles Lakers
- 2013–2014: Cleveland Cavaliers
- 2014: Indiana Pacers

Career highlights
- 2× NBA champion (2009, 2010); NBA All-Star (2012); All-NBA Second Team (2012); McDonald's All-American (2005); Third-team Parade All-American (2005)

Career NBA statistics
- Points: 4,822 (11.5 ppg)
- Rebounds: 3,221 (7.7 rpg)
- Blocks: 657 (1.6 bpg)
- Stats at NBA.com
- Stats at Basketball Reference

Andrew Bynum (born October 27, 1987) is an American former professional basketball player. He played the majority of his career with the Los Angeles Lakers of the National Basketball Association (NBA). After they selected him in the first round of the 2005 NBA draft with the 10th overall pick, the 7-foot (2.1 m) center won two NBA championships with the team in 2009 and 2010. He was named an All-Star and selected to the All-NBA Team in 2012.

Bynum was an All-American player in high school before he decided to forgo college and enter the NBA. He made his NBA debut with the Lakers six days after his 18th birthday, and remains the youngest player ever to play in an NBA game. After seven seasons with the Lakers, he was traded to the Philadelphia 76ers in 2012 as part of a four-team deal that sent All-Star center Dwight Howard to Los Angeles. Bynum missed the entire 2012–13 season because of knee problems. He signed as a free agent with the Cleveland Cavaliers, where he briefly played before being traded to the Chicago Bulls, who subsequently released him. He then signed with the Indiana Pacers for the remainder of the 2013–14 season.

== Early life ==
Bynum was born in Plainsboro Township, New Jersey. His parents, Ernest Bynum and Janet McCoy, divorced when he was a year old. He spent summers visiting his father in North Carolina. Bynum has one older brother, Corey.

== High school career ==
Bynum attended St. Joseph High School, in Metuchen, New Jersey during his junior and senior year. For most of his freshman year, he attended West Windsor-Plainsboro High School North located in Plainsboro, New Jersey. For the remainder of his freshman year and his sophomore year he attended Solebury School in Solebury, Pennsylvania. In his junior year of high school Bynum averaged 16.0 points, 13.0 rebounds, and 6.0 blocks. As a senior, he averaged 22.4 points, 16.8 rebounds and 5.3 blocks per game. During his junior and senior year at St. Joseph High School, Bynum finished his high school career averaging 19.2 points, 14.9 rebounds, and 5.6 blocks in 32 appearances. He played in the 2005 McDonald's All-American game where he tallied 9 points and 5 rebounds. He originally planned to attend the University of Connecticut on a basketball scholarship; however, the 17-year-old made the decision to go directly into the NBA and made himself eligible for the 2005 NBA draft, where he was selected by the Los Angeles Lakers.

== Professional career ==
=== Los Angeles Lakers (2005–2012) ===
==== Rookie season ====
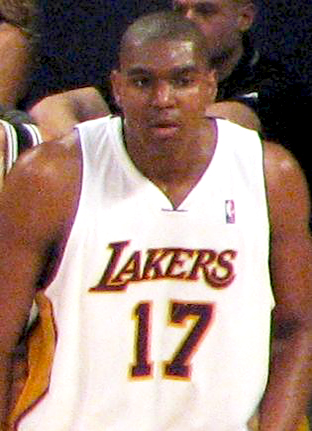
Bynum in 2007

In the 2005 NBA draft, Bynum was selected 10th overall by the Los Angeles Lakers. At age 17 years, 244 days, Bynum was 12 days younger than Jermaine O'Neal, the previous youngest player drafted by an NBA team. After selecting him in the draft, the Lakers hired Hall-of-Famer Kareem Abdul-Jabbar to work with Bynum. Bynum played in a preseason game at 17 years old making him the first player to play in the NBA at 17 years of age. On November 2, 2005, during the Lakers' season opener against the Denver Nuggets, Bynum played six minutes and became the youngest player ever to play in an NBA game at age 18 years, 6 days. During the game, he missed his two field goal attempts but had two rebounds and two blocks. In his second season, Bynum was still the youngest player in the league, due to his draft year being the last that a player could be drafted straight out of high school.

In a game against the Miami Heat on January 16, 2006, Bynum matched up against former Laker center Shaquille O'Neal for the first time. At one point, O'Neal dunked over Bynum on a putback attempt. On the next play, Bynum spun past O'Neal and dunked the ball. He then ran down the court and shoved O'Neal with his elbow, who retaliated by elbowing Bynum's upper chest. Teammate Kobe Bryant quickly stepped in between the two. Both Bynum and O'Neal received technical fouls for the incident.

==== 2006–07 season ====
With Lakers centers Chris Mihm and Kwame Brown injured at the start of 2006–07, Bynum was the starting center for the first 15 games of the season. In his first career start, he scored 18 points and had nine rebounds against the Phoenix Suns on October 31, 2006. His first career double-double on November 7 included a season-high 20 points, 14 rebounds and three blocks against the Minnesota Timberwolves. On January 26, 2007, he had a career-high seven blocks and a season-high 16 rebounds against the Charlotte Bobcats. He played in all 82 games during the season and started 53, finishing with averages of 7.8 points, 5.9 rebounds and 1.6 blocks in just over 21 minutes per game. During the season, the New Jersey Nets were interested in acquiring Bynum for Jason Kidd.

After the season, Coach Pete Newell was impressed with Bynum's development, and stated that teammate Kobe Bryant should back off on his negative treatment of Bynum on the court. Bryant was also shown on an infamous amateur video saying that center Bynum should have been traded for Kidd. The Indiana Pacers also made a trade offer for Bynum. The Lakers would exercise a fourth-year contract option on Bynum.

==== 2007–08 season ====
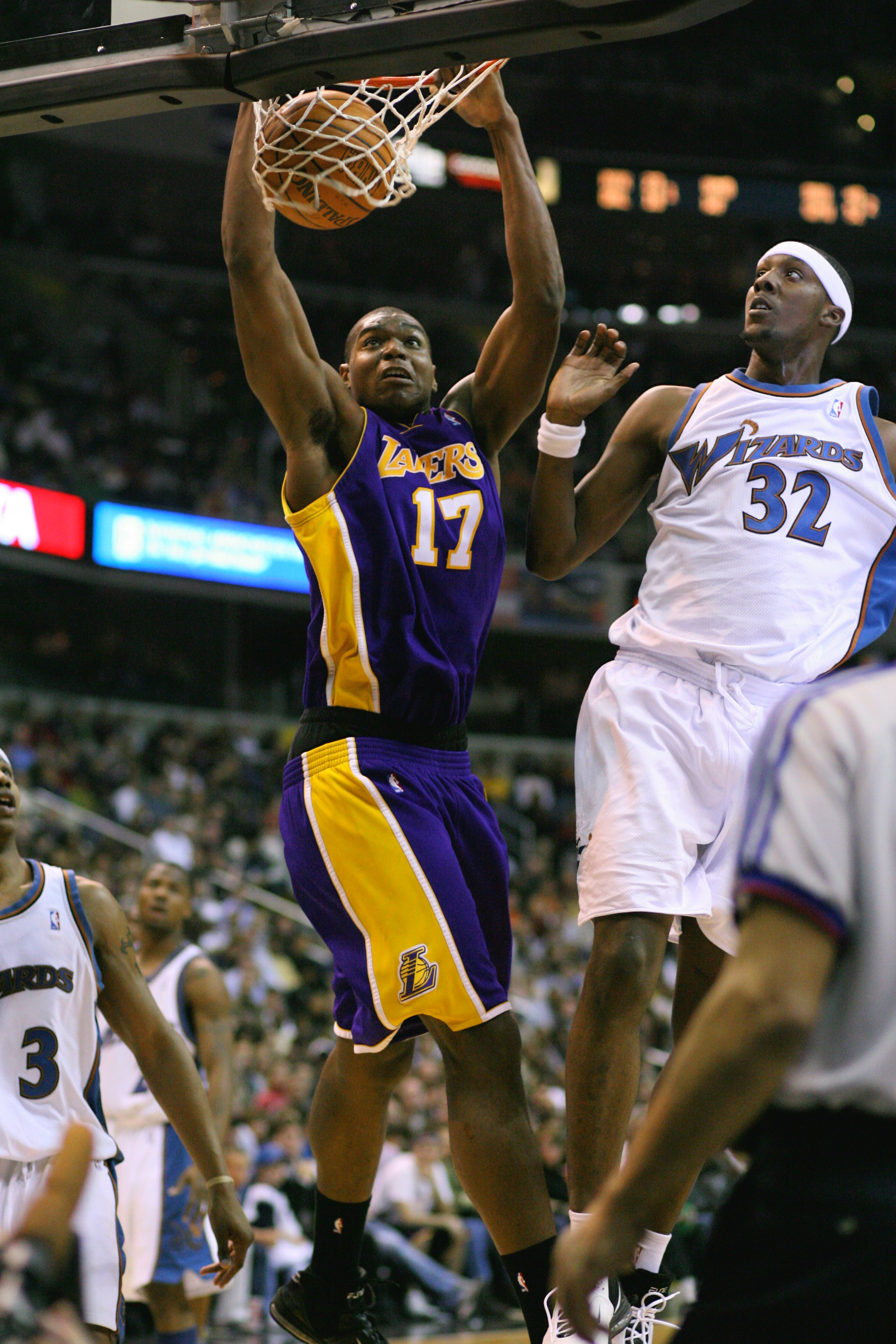
Bynum scoring with a slam dunk

Bynum helped the Lakers start to a 26–11 record, which was at the time the best record in the Pacific Division. Bynum played 35 games and started in 25 games during the season. On Christmas Day against the Phoenix Suns, he made 11-of-13 shots for 28 points to complement 12 boards, 4 assists and 2 blocks.

On January 13, 2008, he suffered an injury during a game against the Memphis Grizzlies. Bynum partially dislocated his left kneecap when he landed awkwardly on teammate Lamar Odom's left foot while attempting to grab a rebound. After Bynum's injury, the Lakers acquired Pau Gasol from the Memphis Grizzlies.

In March, there were reports that he could return before the end of the 2007–08 season or the first round of the playoffs; however, Lakers coach Phil Jackson said that he did not foresee Bynum making serious contributions any time soon in April. In May, rumors about his return were put to rest when Bynum underwent arthroscopic surgery on his kneecap. He missed 46 games due to the injury, and finished the season with averages of 13.1 points, 10.2 rebounds, and 2.1 blocks and a .636 field goal percentage. Without Bynum, the Lakers made it to the 2008 NBA Finals, but lost to the Boston Celtics in six games.

==== 2008–09 season ====
In September 2008, Bynum said that he was 100% healthy and was ready to participate in training camp, which was scheduled to begin at the end of the month, after working with his trainer. On October 30, 2008, he agreed to sign a 4-year, $58 million contract with the Lakers.

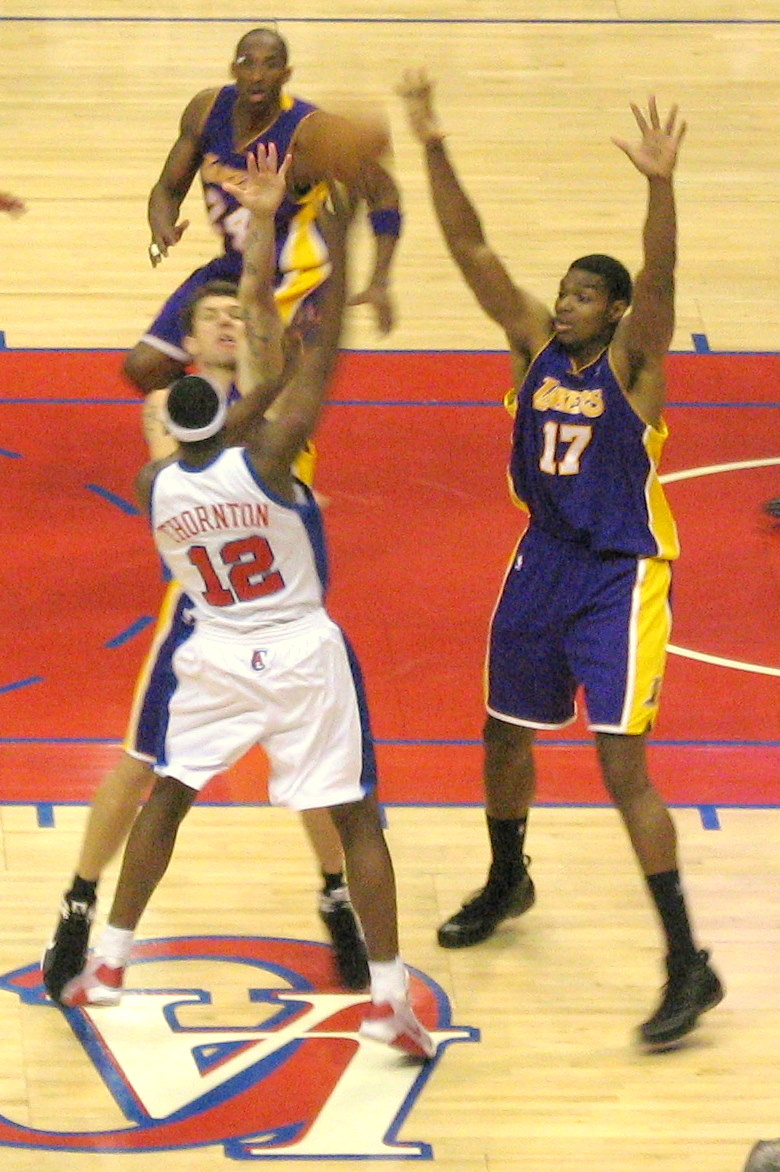
Bynum defending against the Los Angeles Clippers

Bynum set a new career high in scoring with 42 points to go along with 15 rebounds (8 offensive) and 3 blocked shots on January 21, 2009, against the Los Angeles Clippers. On the next night, January 22, versus the Washington Wizards he scored 23 points to go along with 14 rebounds. On January 27, 2009, in a double overtime loss against the Charlotte Bobcats, Bynum committed a flagrant foul, fracturing the rib and subsequently collapsing the lung of Gerald Wallace of the Bobcats. While playing against the Memphis Grizzlies on January 31, 2009, Kobe Bryant had an off balanced shot, fell and collided with Bynum's right knee, resulting in a right knee sprain. On February 2, 2009, it was revealed that Bynum had suffered a torn MCL in his right knee and would be out 8–12 weeks. This was the second straight year that Bynum had suffered a knee injury against the Grizzlies. He had averaged 26 points and 14 rebounds in his previous five games, posting five straight double-doubles.

Bynum missed the next 32 games. On April 9, 2009, he returned from injury in a home game against the Denver Nuggets. Bynum went 0–2 in the first half, but finished with 7–11 by the end of the game. With the 21 minutes that Bynum played, he scored 16 points and grabbed 7 rebounds. Still recovering from his knee injury, he played in the playoffs wearing an awkward knee brace. He was not the same player, averaging 6.3 points and 3.7 rebounds while often in foul trouble. The Lakers advanced to the 2009 NBA Finals against the Orlando Magic. Although Bynum averaged just 19 minutes against the Magic and their center Dwight Howard, the Lakers won the championship.

==== 2009–10 season ====
In the 2010 NBA playoffs, Bynum injured his knee in game 6 against the Oklahoma City Thunder in the first round. It was the third consecutive season his knee injuries impacted the Lakers postseason. However, he kept on playing, and the Lakers won their second championship in a row. Postponing surgery until after the playoffs, Bynum appeared in all 23 of the Lakers' playoff games, averaging 8.6 points and 6.9 rebounds. Teammate Pau Gasol called Bynum's "tenacity remarkable. He gave his best. He sacrificed himself in order to help the team and have a better chance to win the championship."

Before having surgery on his knee, Bynum attended the 2010 World Cup in South Africa and vacationed in Europe. "It's not the most serious (injury)", Bynum said of his torn meniscus. "I'm going to get it taken care of, and then everything is supposed to be cool." Bynum underwent surgery on July 28.

==== 2010–11 season ====
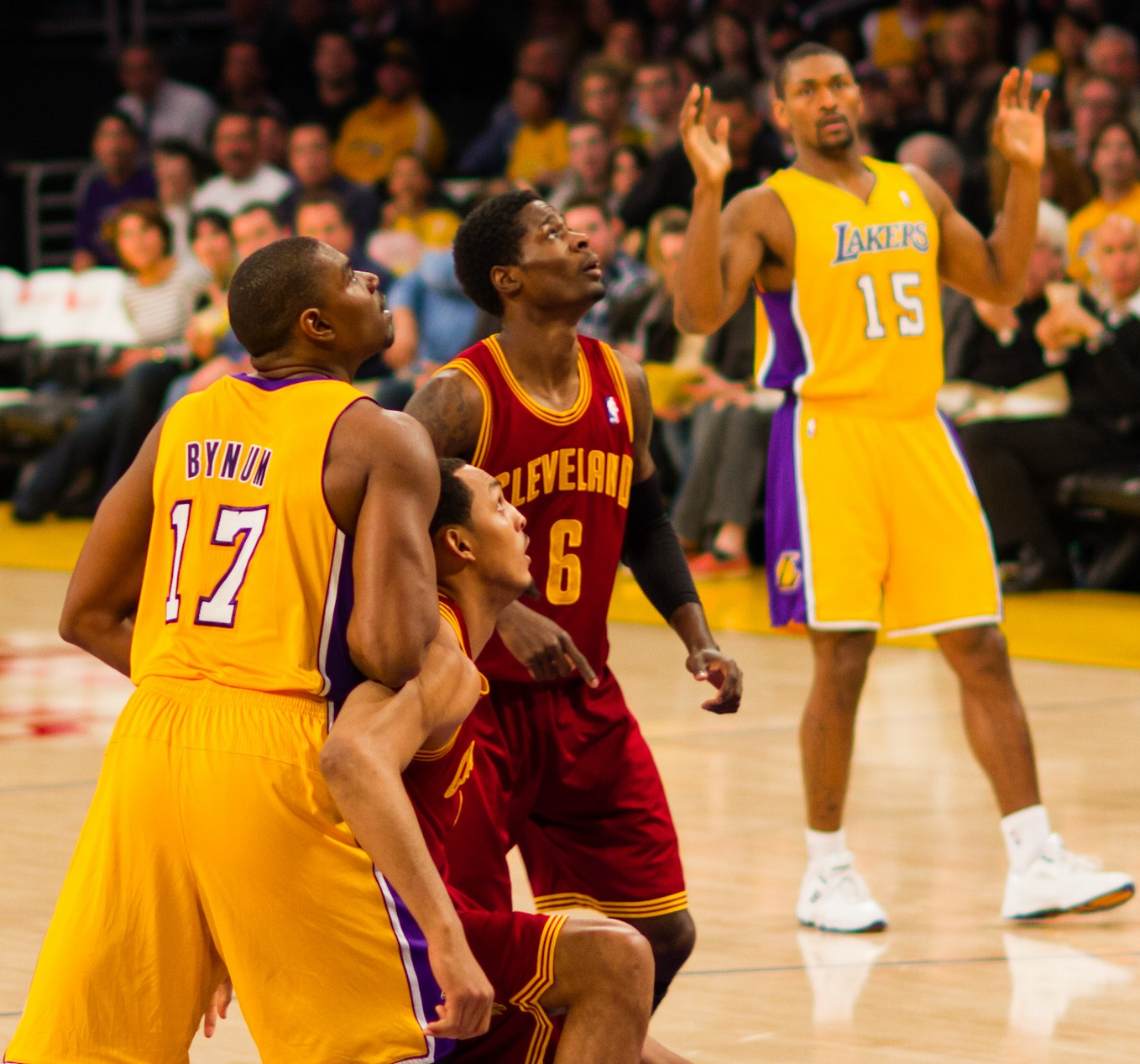
Bynum (#17, being boxed out by Ryan Hollins) and teammate Ron Artest (#15) watch a shot along with Manny Harris (#6) on January 11, 2011

A longer than expected recovery period was needed for Bynum's surgery that caused him to miss the beginning of the 2010–11 NBA season. Bynum gave the Lakers advance notice hours, not weeks, before the opening of training camp. He acknowledged that his doctor told him in advance that he might need more repair to the knee based on findings once the surgery began. Bynum said he would make the same decision again to delay the surgery until after his vacation, even with the knowledge that it would cost him a portion of the upcoming regular season. Kevin Ding of the Orange County Register and Michael Rosenberg of Sports Illustrated criticized Bynum for his summer activities and not expecting complications based on his history with injuries and recovery time.

Bynum came off the bench in his first game of the season on December 14 in a 103–89 win over the Wizards. He finished with 17 minutes, 1-of-5 from the field, seven points, four rebounds and two blocks. "I feel light-years better than back [in game 7 of 2010 NBA Finals]", he said. In his first 24 games played during the season, Bynum averaged 24.6 minutes per game and 27.4 minutes in 17 games as a starter. Jackson was limiting Bynum's minutes in an attempt to minimize his risk of injury. At the All-Star break, Jackson discussed with Bynum that his primary role should be to defend and rebound—not score. It was a role Bynum had previously resisted.

On March 8, Bynum had his third straight game with at least 16 rebounds and had 50 rebounds and 12 blocks in that span. As the Lakers went 8–0 after the All-Star break, Bynum had 10 or more rebounds five times and blocked three or more shots four times while the Lakers held opponents to just 87 points per game. The Lakers revised their defense to have big men no longer be responsible for the perimeter, defending guards coming off screens, and instead have Lakers' defenders funnel the players inside to Bynum.

On March 14, Bynum tied his career high in rebounds with 18 against Howard and the Magic.

On March 20, Bynum was suspended for two games by the NBA for a flagrant foul on Michael Beasley of the Minnesota Timberwolves.

On April 5, in a loss to the Utah Jazz, he grabbed a career-high 23 rebounds.

On April 12 against the San Antonio Spurs, Bynum hyper-extended his right knee A magnetic resonance imaging (MRI) exam revealed he had a bruised knee, and he missed the last game of the regular season. Bynum ended the season averaging 11 points, 12 rebounds and 2.4 blocks after the All-Star break. He returned to the lineup for the start of the playoffs. After the Lakers defeated the New Orleans Hornets in the first round, 4–2, Hornets head coach Monty Williams said, "Kobe's Kobe, but I thought Bynum decided the series. He was that good."

In the Lakers' second-round playoff series against the Dallas Mavericks, Bynum was ejected in the final game of the Mavericks' four-game sweep for a flagrant foul on J. J. Barea moments after teammate Lamar Odom was ejected for fouling Dirk Nowitzki. Bynum's actions were condemned by the sports news media, and he was suspended four games for the next season and fined $25,000.

==== 2011–12 season ====
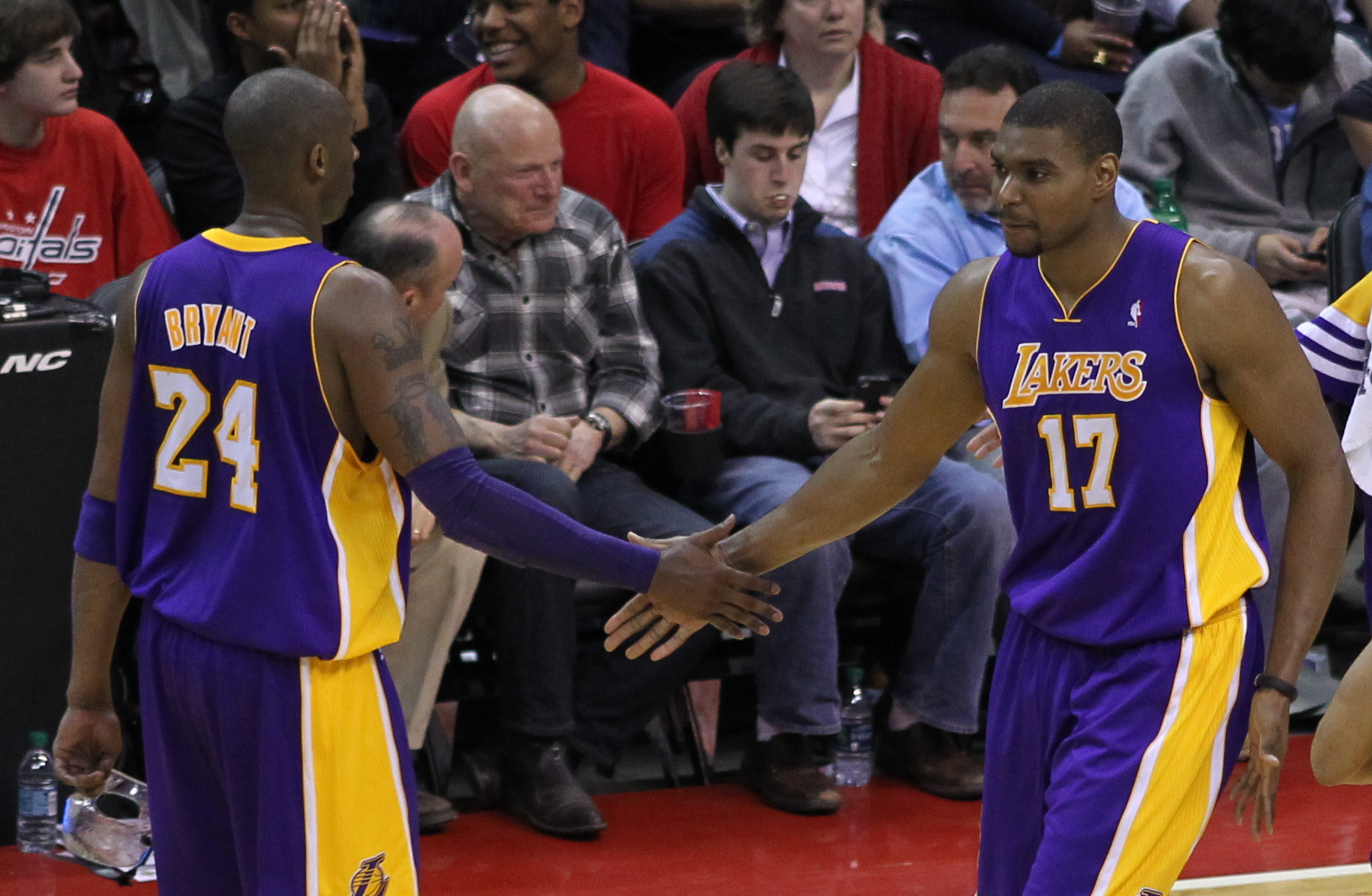
Bynum slaps hands with teammate Kobe Bryant.

Jackson retired from coaching after 2010–11, and he was then replaced by Mike Brown. During Brown's interview for the position, Lakers executive Jim Buss said Bynum needed to receive the ball inside, and Brown planned for Bynum to get the ball "more than what he did in the past." The new coach believed Bynum could become an All-Star, and perennial All-Star center Yao Ming had retired and Tim Duncan's skills were declining. In his first game of the season after serving his suspension, Bynum scored 29 points on 13 for 18 shooting and grabbed 13 rebounds, leading the Lakers to a 92–89 victory over the Denver Nuggets.

On January 3 against the Houston Rockets, Bynum had 21 points and 22 rebounds in the first 20–20 game of his career. He was selected as a starter to his first All-Star Game. Bynum was awarded Western Conference Player of the Week honors for the second time of his young career for games played Monday, March 12, through Sunday, March 18. He led the Lakers to a 3–1 week, leading the West in rebounding (14.8 rpg) and placed second in scoring (27.5) while shooting .665 from the field (fourth in the Conference). On March 28 against the Golden State Warriors, Bynum was benched by coach Mike Brown for the remainder of the third quarter after attempting an ill-advised three-point field goal with 10:05 left and the Lakers leading 56–50. Bynum did not join his teammates in huddles during multiple timeouts in the fourth quarter, instead sitting by himself toward the end of the bench. He was fined by the team around $7,500 for his actions. About a week later, he was again not involved in timeouts against an undermanned New Orleans Hornets team, explaining afterwards that he was resting and "getting my Zen on."

On April 11, Bynum grabbed a career- and an NBA season-high 30 rebounds against the San Antonio Spurs to become the fifth Lakers player ever to register at least 30 rebounds in a single game. Bynum finished the regular season with career highs in minutes per game (tied NBA 24th overall), rebounds per game (NBA 3rd overall), and points per game (NBA 20th overall). He also finished with the third-highest field-goal percentage in the league and 6th overall in blocks per game. Bynum ended the season tied with Oklahoma City All-Star guard Russell Westbrook at 10th overall in Player Efficiency Rating (PER) with a PER of 23.00. Bynum only missed one game the entire season due to injury (ankle). He became widely mentioned along with Howard as being the top center playing in the NBA.

In a 103–88 win against the Nuggets in the opening game of the playoffs, Bynum had a triple-double with 10 points, 13 rebounds, and 10 blocked shots. The blocked shots broke Kareem Abdul-Jabbar's franchise record of nine, and tied the NBA playoff record set by Mark Eaton and Hakeem Olajuwon. After the Lakers led the series 3–1, Bynum said, "Close-out games are actually kind of easy." The Lakers eventually won the series 4–3 with Bynum contributing a career playoff-high 18 rebounds in game 7.

=== Trade to Philadelphia 76ers (2012–2013) and injuries ===
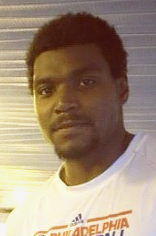
Bynum during his short tenure with the 76ers in August 2012

On June 4, 2012, the Lakers exercised their $16.1 million team option on Bynum's contract for the 2012–13 season. On August 10, he was traded to the Philadelphia 76ers in a four-team deal that also sent Dwight Howard from the Magic to the Lakers and Andre Iguodala from the 76ers to the Denver Nuggets. The Magic decided against receiving Bynum due to concerns over his knees and his upcoming free agent status.

About a week before training camp, Bynum underwent Orthokine treatments on both of his knees to stimulate healing for his arthritis. As a precaution at the start of camp, the 76ers decided to hold Bynum out from basketball activities for three weeks after he experienced discomfort in his knees. He was also diagnosed with a bone bruise to his right knee that was unrelated to the treatments he received. He did not practice or play with the team prior to the season, and suffered another setback after injuring his left knee while bowling. In November, Sixers general manager Tony DiLeo said Bynum's knees had worsened since the trade, and Bynum was declared out indefinitely. Since training camp, Bynum had been firm that he would make his debut for Philadelphia, and had targeted the All-Star break for his return. After still not playing through the end of February, it was reported that Bynum's knees had begun to degenerate.

On March 1, with swelling in his right knee, he conceded he might not play by the end of the season, although he said his left knee was fine. On March 19, Bynum had season-ending arthroscopic surgery on both knees, ending his 76ers tenure without appearing in a game for the franchise.

=== Cleveland Cavaliers (2013–2014) ===
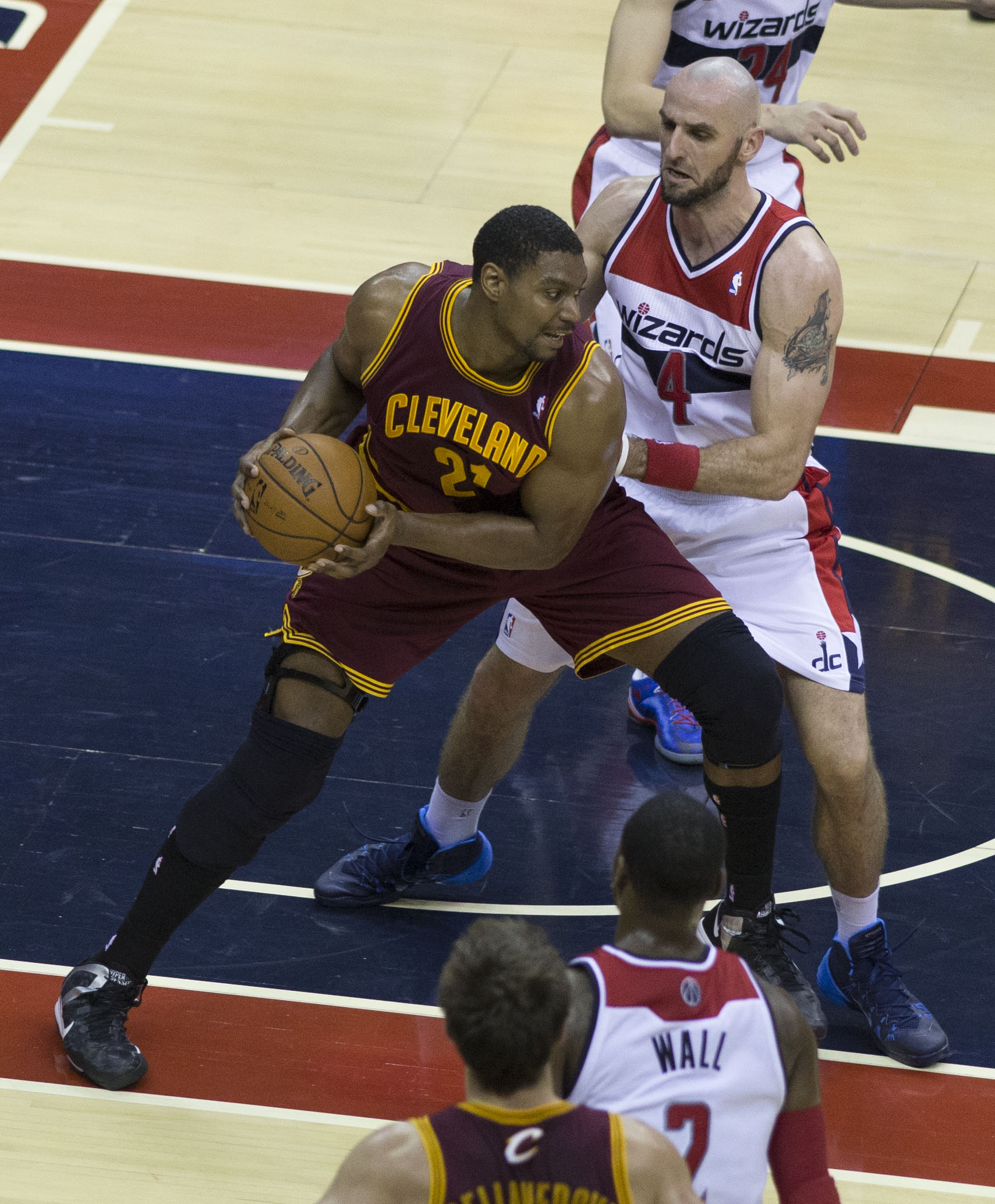
Bynum defended by Marcin Gortat of the Washington Wizards

On July 19, 2013, Bynum signed with the Cleveland Cavaliers. Reportedly, the incentive-laden contract could pay him up to $24.79 million over two years. On October 30, 2013, he made his debut for the Cavaliers recording 3 points and 3 rebounds in 8 minutes of play. On November 30, Bynum set season highs of 20 points, 10 rebounds, and 5 blocks in a 97–93 victory over the Chicago Bulls. However, he also struggled at times, shooting 0–11 from the field with no points in 22 minutes in a loss to Detroit. On December 28, Bynum was suspended indefinitely by the Cavaliers for conduct detrimental to the team; he had been thrown out of practice after shooting the ball every time he received it, regardless of how far he was from the basket.

On January 7, 2014, the Cavaliers traded Bynum, a future first-round draft pick, two future second-round picks, and the option to swap first-round picks in 2015 to the Chicago Bulls for Luol Deng. The same day, he was waived by the Bulls in a salary cap move that was projected to save Chicago more than $20 million and provide relief from paying the NBA's luxury tax. During his time with the Cavaliers, Bynum averaged 8.4 points and 5.3 rebounds per game in 20 minutes of play.

=== Indiana Pacers (2014) ===
On February 1, 2014, Bynum signed with the Indiana Pacers for the remainder of the season. He was expected to back up All-Star center Roy Hibbert along with Ian Mahinmi. Coach Frank Vogel planned to give Bynum one to two weeks of practice before evaluating if he was ready to play.

On March 11, 2014, Bynum made his Pacers debut with 8 points and 10 rebounds in 15 minutes in a 94–83 win over the Boston Celtics. He appeared in only two games before Indiana declared him out indefinitely with swelling and soreness in his right knee; he missed the remainder of the regular season. On May 7, before game 2 of the second round of the 2014 NBA playoffs against Washington, the Pacers announced that Bynum would miss the remainder of the season and would no longer be involved in team activities. As late as 2018, Bynum was still working on an attempted NBA comeback.

== NBA career statistics ==
Legend
GP	Games played	GS	Games started	MPG	Minutes per game
FG%	Field goal percentage	3P%	3-point field goal percentage	FT%	Free throw percentage
RPG	Rebounds per game	APG	Assists per game	SPG	Steals per game
BPG	Blocks per game	PPG	Points per game	**Bold**	Career high
†	Won an NBA championship	*	Led the league

=== Regular season ===
Year	Team	GP	GS	MPG	FG%	3P%	FT%	RPG	APG	SPG	BPG	PPG
2005–06	L.A. Lakers	46	0	7.3	.402	.000	.296	1.7	.2	.1	.5	1.6
2006–07	L.A. Lakers	**82***	53	21.9	.558	.000	.668	5.9	1.1	.1	1.6	7.8
2007–08	L.A. Lakers	35	25	28.8	**.636**	.000	.695	10.2	**1.7**	.3	**2.1**	13.1
2008–09†	L.A. Lakers	50	50	28.9	.560	.000	.707	8.0	1.4	.4	1.8	14.3
2009–10†	L.A. Lakers	65	**65**	30.4	.570	.000	.739	8.3	1.0	**.5**	1.4	15.0
2010–11	L.A. Lakers	54	47	27.8	.574	.000	.660	9.4	1.4	.4	2.0	11.3
2011–12	L.A. Lakers	60	60	**35.2**	.558	**.200**	.692	**11.8**	1.4	**.5**	1.9	**18.7**
2013–14	Cleveland	24	19	20.0	.419	.000	**.762**	5.3	1.1	.3	1.2	8.4
2013–14	Indiana	2	0	18.0	.409	.000	.714	9.5	1.0	.0	2.0	11.5
Career		418	319	25.6	.556	.111	.690	7.7	1.2	.3	1.6	11.5
All-Star		1	1	5.0	.000	.000	.000	3.0	1.0	1.0	1.0	.0

=== Playoffs ===
Year	Team	GP	GS	MPG	FG%	3P%	FT%	RPG	APG	SPG	BPG	PPG
2006	L.A. Lakers	1	0	2.0	.000	.000	.000	.0	.0	.0	.0	.0
2007	L.A. Lakers	5	0	11.0	.533	.000	.400	4.6	.0	.0	.4	4.0
2009†	L.A. Lakers	**23**	18	17.4	.457	.000	.651	3.7	.4	.3	.9	6.3
2010†	L.A. Lakers	**23**	**23**	24.4	.537	.000	.679	6.9	.5	.3	1.6	8.6
2011	L.A. Lakers	10	10	32.0	**.543**	.000	**.833**	9.6	.8	**.5**	1.4	14.4
2012	L.A. Lakers	12	12	**37.6**	.477	.000	.783	**11.1**	**1.5**	.4	**3.1**	**16.7**
Career		74	63	24.2	.502	.000	.720	6.7	.6	.3	1.5	9.5

== See also ==
- List of NBA single-game rebounding leaders
- List of NBA single-game blocks leaders
- List of oldest and youngest NBA players
