= List of oldest and youngest NBA players =

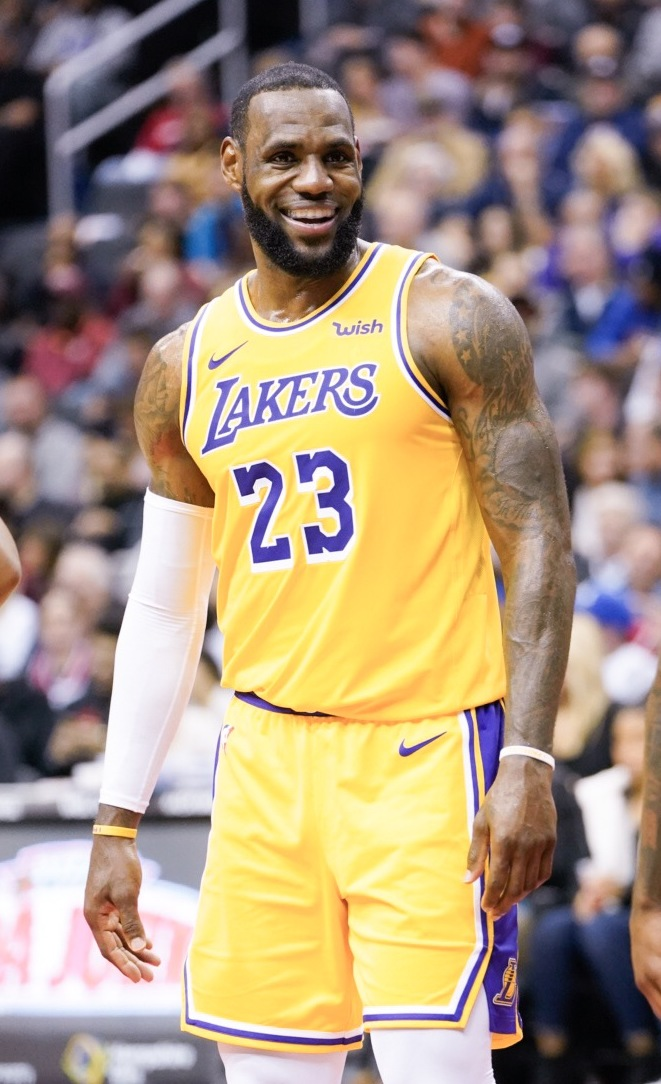
LeBron James is the oldest active player

This is a list of oldest and youngest National Basketball Association players. The National Basketball Association (NBA) is a men's professional basketball league in North America. The NBA was founded in 1946 as the Basketball Association of America (BAA). The league adopted its current name at the start of the 1949–50 NBA season when it merged with the National Basketball League (NBL). The oldest person ever to play in the NBA was Nat Hickey, a coach who activated himself as a player for a game two days before his 46th birthday. The youngest player ever to play in the NBA was Andrew Bynum, who played his first game only six days after his 18th birthday. The oldest active player is LeBron James, who is currently 41 years, 326 days old. He is the only active player who was born before 1986 and drafted before 2007, as well as the only player to be both on the NBA's list of youngest and oldest players in league history. The youngest active player in the NBA is Cameron Boozer, the 3rd overall pick in the 2026 NBA draft, who is currently 19 years, 126 days old.

== Oldest players ==
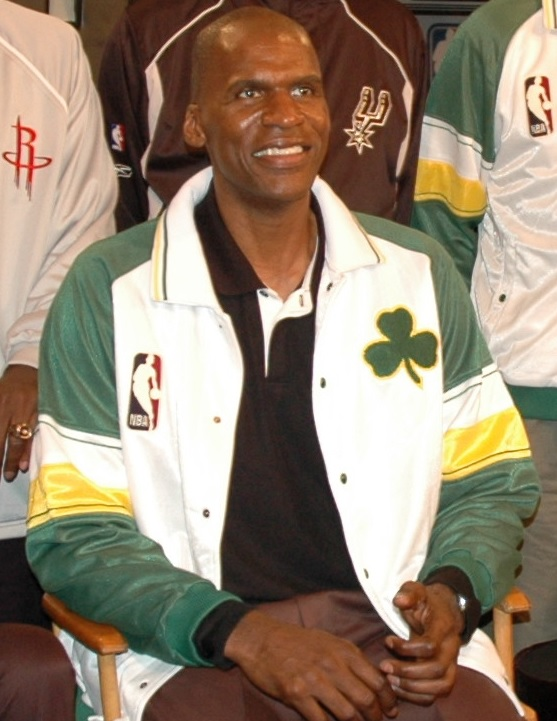
Robert Parish is the third-oldest player to ever play in the NBA.

The oldest player ever to play in the NBA was Nat Hickey who played a game in the 1947–48 BAA season when he was 45 years and 363 days old. Hickey, who was coaching the Providence Steamrollers at the time, decided to activate himself and played in a game for the Steamrollers. In his first game as a player for the Steamrollers, he missed all six of his shot attempts and only scored two points from three free throw attempts; he only played in one more game before retiring as a player two days shy of his 46th birthday. The second-oldest player is Kevin Willis, who played 20 seasons (excluding the 1988–89 NBA season he missed due to injury) in the league before he sat out the 2005–06 NBA season and earned a contract with the Dallas Mavericks on April 2, 2007. Willis then played five games for the Mavericks at the age of 44. The third-oldest player is Hall of Famer Robert Parish. Parish, who played with the Boston Celtics in the 1980s, played his last season with the Chicago Bulls at the age of 43. He played in 1,611 regular season games during his 21-year career, which stood as the league record until March 21, 2026, when it was surpassed by LeBron James. When the Bulls won the 1997 NBA Finals, Parish became the oldest player ever to win the NBA championship. There are 36 players who played in the NBA after they turned 40. Following the retirements of Udonis Haslem and Andre Iguodala shortly after the 2022–23 NBA season, the oldest active player is LeBron James.

=== All-time ===
^	Denotes player who is still active in the NBA as of the 2026–27 NBA season
*	Denotes player who has been inducted to the Naismith Memorial Basketball Hall of Fame
†	Denotes player who is not yet eligible for Hall of Fame consideration

Player	Pos	Birth date	Last game	Age	Team(s) played (years)	Draft (pick)	Ref.
Nat Hickey	G/F	January 30, 1902	January 28, 1948	45 years, 363 days	Providence Steamrollers (1948)	Undrafted	
Kevin Willis	F/C	September 6, 1962	April 18, 2007	44 years, 224 days	8 teams: Atlanta Hawks (1984–1994); Miami Heat (1994–1996); Golden State Warriors (1996); Houston Rockets (1996–1998); Toronto Raptors (1998–2001); Denver Nuggets (2001); Houston Rockets (2001–2002); San Antonio Spurs (2002–2004); Atlanta Hawks (2004–2005); Dallas Mavericks (2007)	1984 (11th)	
Robert Parish*	C	August 30, 1953	May 11, 1997	43 years, 254 days	4 teams: Golden State Warriors (1976–1980); Boston Celtics (1980–1994); Charlotte Hornets (1994–1996); Chicago Bulls (1996–1997)	1976 (8th)	
Vince Carter*	G/F	January 26, 1977	March 11, 2020	43 years, 45 days	8 teams: Toronto Raptors (1998–2004); New Jersey Nets (2004–2009); Orlando Magic (2009–2010); Phoenix Suns (2010–2011); Dallas Mavericks (2011–2014); Memphis Grizzlies (2014–2017); Sacramento Kings (2017–2018); Atlanta Hawks (2018–2020)	1998 (5th)	
Udonis Haslem	F/C	June 9, 1980	June 7, 2023	42 years, 363 days	Miami Heat (2003–2023)	2002 (Undrafted)	
Dikembe Mutombo*	C	June 25, 1966	April 21, 2009	42 years, 300 days	6 teams: Denver Nuggets (1991–1996); Atlanta Hawks (1996–2001); Philadelphia 76ers (2001–2002); New Jersey Nets (2002–2003); New York Knicks (2003–2004); Houston Rockets (2004–2009)	1991 (4th)	
Kareem Abdul-Jabbar*	C	April 16, 1947	June 13, 1989	42 years, 58 days	2 teams: Milwaukee Bucks (1969–1975); Los Angeles Lakers (1975–1989)	1969 (1st)	
LeBron James^	F	December 30, 1984	Present	41 years, 326 days	4 teams: Cleveland Cavaliers (2003–2010); Miami Heat (2010–2014); Cleveland Cavaliers (2014–2018); Los Angeles Lakers (2018–2026); Philadelphia 76ers (2026–present)	2003 (1st)	
Bob Cousy*	G	August 9, 1928	January 6, 1970	41 years, 150 days	2 teams: Boston Celtics (1950–1963); Cincinnati Royals (1969–1970)	1950 (3rd)	
Herb Williams	C/F	February 16, 1958	June 25, 1999	41 years, 129 days	4 teams: Indiana Pacers (1981–1989); Dallas Mavericks (1989–1992); New York Knicks (1992–1996); Toronto Raptors (1996); New York Knicks (1996–1999)	1981 (14th)	
John Stockton*	G	March 26, 1962	April 30, 2003	41 years, 35 days	Utah Jazz (1984–2003)	1984 (16th)	
Charles Jones	F/C	April 3, 1957	May 3, 1998	41 years, 30 days	5 teams: Philadelphia 76ers (1984); Chicago Bulls (1984); Washington Bullets (1985–1993); Detroit Pistons (1994); Houston Rockets (1995–1998)	1979 (165th)	
Karl Malone*	F	July 24, 1963	June 13, 2004	40 years, 325 days	2 teams: Utah Jazz (1985–2003); Los Angeles Lakers (2003–2004)	1985 (13th)	
Dirk Nowitzki*	F/C	June 19, 1978	April 10, 2019	40 years, 295 days	Dallas Mavericks (1998–2019)	1998 (9th)	
Taj Gibson^{†}	F	June 24, 1985	April 12, 2026	40 years, 292 days	8 teams: Chicago Bulls (2009–2017); Oklahoma City Thunder (2017); Minnesota Timberwolves (2017–2019); New York Knicks (2019–2022); Washington Wizards (2022–2023); New York Knicks (2023–2024); Detroit Pistons (2024); Charlotte Hornets (2024–2025); Memphis Grizzlies (2026)	2009 (26th)	
Manu Ginóbili*	G	July 28, 1977	April 24, 2018	40 years, 270 days	San Antonio Spurs (2002–2018)	1999 (57th)	
Rick Mahorn	C/F	September 21, 1958	May 23, 1999	40 years, 244 days	4 teams: Washington Bullets (1980–1985); Detroit Pistons (1985–1989); Philadelphia 76ers (1989–1991); New Jersey Nets (1992–1996); Detroit Pistons (1996–1998); Philadelphia 76ers (1999)	1980 (35th)	
John Long	G/F	August 28, 1956	April 20, 1997	40 years, 235 days	4 teams: Detroit Pistons (1978–1986); Indiana Pacers (1986–1989); Detroit Pistons (1989); Atlanta Hawks (1990); Detroit Pistons (1991); Toronto Raptors (1996–1997)	1978 (29th)	
Jason Terry	G	September 15, 1977	April 28, 2018	40 years, 225 days	6 teams: Atlanta Hawks (1999–2004); Dallas Mavericks (2004–2012); Boston Celtics (2012–2013); Brooklyn Nets (2013–2014); Houston Rockets (2014–2016); Milwaukee Bucks (2016–2018)	1999 (10th)	
Grant Hill*	F	October 5, 1972	May 3, 2013	40 years, 210 days	4 teams: Detroit Pistons (1994–2000); Orlando Magic (2000–2007); Phoenix Suns (2007–2012); Los Angeles Clippers (2012–2013)	1994 (3rd)	
Chris Paul^{†}	G	May 6, 1985	December 1, 2025	40 years, 209 days	7 teams: New Orleans Hornets (2005–2011); Los Angeles Clippers (2011–2017); Houston Rockets (2017–2019); Oklahoma City Thunder (2019–2020); Phoenix Suns (2020–2023); Golden State Warriors (2023–2024); San Antonio Spurs (2024–2025); Los Angeles Clippers (2025–2026)	2005 (4th)	
James Edwards	C/F	November 22, 1955	May 27, 1996	40 years, 187 days	8 teams: Los Angeles Lakers (1977); Indiana Pacers (1977–1981); Cleveland Cavaliers (1981–1983); Phoenix Suns (1983–1988); Detroit Pistons (1988–1991); Los Angeles Clippers (1991–1992); Los Angeles Lakers (1992–1994); Portland Trail Blazers (1994–1995); Chicago Bulls (1995–1996)	1977 (46th)	
Joe Johnson	G	June 29, 1981	December 22, 2021	40 years, 176 days	7 teams: Boston Celtics (2001–2002); Phoenix Suns (2002–2005); Atlanta Hawks (2005–2012); Brooklyn Nets (2012–2016); Miami Heat (2016); Utah Jazz (2016–2018); Houston Rockets (2018); Boston Celtics (2021–2022)	2001 (10th)	
Al Horford^	C	June 3, 1986	Present	40 years, 171 days	5 teams: Atlanta Hawks (2007–2016); Boston Celtics (2016–2019); Philadelphia 76ers (2019–2020); Oklahoma City Thunder (2020–2021); Boston Celtics (2021–2025); Golden State Warriors (2025–present)	2007 (3rd)	
Kurt Thomas	F	October 4, 1972	March 18, 2013	40 years, 165 days	9 teams: Miami Heat (1995–1997); Dallas Mavericks (1997–1998); New York Knicks (1999–2005); Phoenix Suns (2005–2007); Seattle SuperSonics (2007–2008); San Antonio Spurs (2008–2009); Milwaukee Bucks (2009–2010); Chicago Bulls (2010–2011); Portland Trail Blazers (2011–2012); New York Knicks (2012–2013)	1995 (10th)	
Clifford Robinson	F/C	December 16, 1966	May 12, 2007	40 years, 147 days	5 teams: Portland Trail Blazers (1989–1997); Phoenix Suns (1997–2001); Detroit Pistons (2001–2003); Golden State Warriors (2003–2005); New Jersey Nets (2005–2007)	1989 (36th)	
Jamal Crawford	G	March 20, 1980	August 4, 2020	40 years, 137 days	9 teams: Chicago Bulls (2000–2004); New York Knicks (2004–2008); Golden State Warriors (2008–2009); Atlanta Hawks (2009–2011); Portland Trail Blazers (2011–2012); Los Angeles Clippers (2012–2017); Minnesota Timberwolves (2017–2018); Phoenix Suns (2018–2019); Brooklyn Nets (2020)	2000 (8th)	
Charles Oakley	F/C	December 18, 1963	April 2, 2004	40 years, 106 days	5 teams: Chicago Bulls (1985–1988); New York Knicks (1988–1998); Toronto Raptors (1998–2001); Chicago Bulls (2001–2002); Washington Wizards (2002–2003); Houston Rockets (2004)	1985 (9th)	
Juwan Howard	F	February 7, 1973	April 17, 2013	40 years, 69 days	8 teams: Washington Bullets / Wizards (1994–2001); Dallas Mavericks (2001–2002); Denver Nuggets (2002–2003); Orlando Magic (2003–2004); Houston Rockets (2004–2007); Dallas Mavericks (2007–2008); Denver Nuggets (2008); Charlotte Bobcats (2008–2009); Portland Trail Blazers (2009–2010); Miami Heat (2010–2013)	1994 (5th)	
Steve Nash*	G	February 7, 1974	April 8, 2014	40 years, 60 days	3 teams: Phoenix Suns (1996–1998); Dallas Mavericks (1998–2004); Phoenix Suns (2004–2012); Los Angeles Lakers (2012–2015)	1996 (15th)	
Michael Jordan*	G	February 17, 1963	April 16, 2003	40 years, 58 days	2 teams: Chicago Bulls (1984–1993, 1995–1998); Washington Wizards (2001–2003)	1984 (3rd)	
Jason Kidd*	G	March 23, 1973	May 18, 2013	40 years, 56 days	4 teams: Dallas Mavericks (1994–1996); Phoenix Suns (1996–2001); New Jersey Nets (2001–2008); Dallas Mavericks (2008–2012); New York Knicks (2012–2013)	1994 (2nd)	
Andre Miller	G	March 19, 1976	May 12, 2016	40 years, 54 days	9 teams: Cleveland Cavaliers (1999–2002); Los Angeles Clippers (2002–2003); Denver Nuggets (2003–2006); Philadelphia 76ers (2006–2009); Portland Trail Blazers (2009–2011); Denver Nuggets (2011–2014); Washington Wizards (2014–2015); Sacramento Kings (2015); Minnesota Timberwolves (2015–2016); San Antonio Spurs (2016)	1999 (8th)	
Kyle Lowry^{†}	G	March 25, 1986	April 30, 2026	40 years, 36 days	5 teams: Memphis Grizzlies (2006–2009); Houston Rockets (2009–2012); Toronto Raptors (2012–2021); Miami Heat (2021–2024); Philadelphia 76ers (2024–2026)	2006 (24th)	
Tim Duncan*	F/C	April 25, 1976	May 12, 2016	40 years, 17 days	San Antonio Spurs (1997–2016)	1997 (1st)	
P. J. Tucker^{†}	F	May 5, 1985	May 16, 2025	40 years, 11 days	8 teams: Toronto Raptors (2006–2007); Phoenix Suns (2012–2017); Toronto Raptors (2017); Houston Rockets (2017–2021); Milwaukee Bucks (2021); Miami Heat (2021–2022); Philadelphia 76ers (2022–2023); Los Angeles Clippers (2023–2024); New York Knicks (2025)	2006 (35th)	
Danny Schayes	C/F	May 10, 1959	May 13, 1999	40 years, 3 days	7 teams: Utah Jazz (1981–1983); Denver Nuggets (1983–1990); Milwaukee Bucks (1990–1994); Los Angeles Lakers (1994); Phoenix Suns (1994–1995); Miami Heat (1995–1996); Orlando Magic (1996–1999)	1981 (13th)	

=== Active ===
This list includes active players signed to an NBA roster who are or will be at least 35 years old in the current season or year.

Player	Pos	Birth date	Age	Team(s) played (years)	Draft (pick)	Ref.
LeBron James	F	December 30, 1984	41 years, 326 days	4 teams: Cleveland Cavaliers (2003–2010); Miami Heat (2010–2014); Cleveland Cavaliers (2014–2018); Los Angeles Lakers (2018–2026); Philadelphia 76ers (2026–present)	2003 (1st)	
Al Horford	C	June 3, 1986	40 years, 171 days	5 teams: Atlanta Hawks (2007–2016); Boston Celtics (2016–2019); Philadelphia 76ers (2019–2020); Oklahoma City Thunder (2020–2021); Boston Celtics (2021–2025); Golden State Warriors (2025–present)	2007 (3rd)	
Mike Conley	G	October 11, 1987	39 years, 41 days	4 teams: Memphis Grizzlies (2007–2019); Utah Jazz (2019–2023); Minnesota Timberwolves (2023–2026); Boston Celtics (2026–present)	2007 (4th)	
Stephen Curry	G	March 14, 1988	38 years, 252 days	Golden State Warriors (2009–present)	2009 (7th)	
Brook Lopez	C	April 1, 1988	38 years, 234 days	4 teams: New Jersey / Brooklyn Nets (2008–2017); Los Angeles Lakers (2017–2018); Milwaukee Bucks (2018–2025); Los Angeles Clippers (2025–present)	2008 (10th)	
DeAndre Jordan	C	July 21, 1988	38 years, 123 days	8 teams: Los Angeles Clippers (2008–2018); Dallas Mavericks (2018–2019); New York Knicks (2019); Brooklyn Nets (2019–2021); Los Angeles Lakers (2021–2022); Philadelphia 76ers (2022); Denver Nuggets (2022–2025); New Orleans Pelicans (2025–present)	2008 (35th)	
Kevin Durant	F	September 29, 1988	38 years, 53 days	5 teams: Seattle SuperSonics / Oklahoma City Thunder (2007–2016); Golden State Warriors (2016–2019); Brooklyn Nets (2019–2023); Phoenix Suns (2023–2025); Houston Rockets (2025–present)	2007 (2nd)	
DeMar DeRozan	G/F	August 7, 1989	37 years, 106 days	5 teams: Toronto Raptors (2009–2018); San Antonio Spurs (2018–2021); Chicago Bulls (2021–2024); Sacramento Kings (2024–2026); Denver Nuggets (2026–present)	2009 (9th)	
James Harden	G	August 26, 1989	37 years, 87 days	6 teams: Oklahoma City Thunder (2009–2012); Houston Rockets (2012–2021); Brooklyn Nets (2021–2022); Philadelphia 76ers (2022–2023); Los Angeles Clippers (2023–2026); Cleveland Cavaliers (2026–present)	2009 (3rd)	
Jimmy Butler	G/F	September 14, 1989	37 years, 68 days	5 teams: Chicago Bulls (2011–2017); Minnesota Timberwolves (2017–2018); Philadelphia 76ers (2018–2019); Miami Heat (2019–2025); Golden State Warriors (2025–present)	2011 (30th)	
Klay Thompson	G/F	February 8, 1990	36 years, 286 days	3 teams: Golden State Warriors (2011–2024); Dallas Mavericks (2024–2026); Miami Heat (2026–present)	2011 (11th)	
Draymond Green	F	March 4, 1990	36 years, 262 days	Golden State Warriors (2012–present)	2012 (35th)	
Mason Plumlee	C	March 5, 1990	36 years, 261 days	9 teams: Brooklyn Nets (2013–2015); Portland Trail Blazers (2015–2017); Denver Nuggets (2017–2020); Detroit Pistons (2020–2021); Charlotte Hornets (2021–2023); Los Angeles Clippers (2023–2024); Phoenix Suns (2024–2025); Charlotte Hornets (2025–2026); San Antonio Spurs (2025–2026); Sacramento Kings (2026–present)	2013 (13th)	
Paul George	G/F	May 2, 1990	36 years, 203 days	5 teams: Indiana Pacers (2010–2017); Oklahoma City Thunder (2017–2019); Los Angeles Clippers (2019–2024); Philadelphia 76ers (2024–2026); Boston Celtics (2026–present)	2010 (10th)	
Jrue Holiday	G	June 12, 1990	36 years, 162 days	5 teams: Philadelphia 76ers (2009–2013); New Orleans Pelicans (2013–2020); Milwaukee Bucks (2020–2023); Boston Celtics (2023–2025); Portland Trail Blazers (2025–present)	2009 (17th)	
Damian Lillard	G	July 15, 1990	36 years, 129 days	2 teams: Portland Trail Blazers (2012–2023); Milwaukee Bucks (2023–2025); Portland Trail Blazers (2026–present)	2012 (6th)	
Nikola Vučević	C	October 24, 1990	36 years, 28 days	4 teams: Philadelphia 76ers (2011–2012); Orlando Magic (2012–2021); Chicago Bulls (2021–2026); Boston Celtics (2026); Orlando Magic (2026–present)	2011 (16th)	
Kawhi Leonard	F	June 29, 1991	35 years, 145 days	3 teams: San Antonio Spurs (2011–2018); Toronto Raptors (2018–2019); Los Angeles Clippers (2019–2026); Toronto Raptors (2026–present)	2011 (15th)	
Khris Middleton	F/G	August 12, 1991	35 years, 101 days	4 teams: Detroit Pistons (2012–2013); Milwaukee Bucks (2013–2025); Washington Wizards (2025–2026); Dallas Mavericks (2026); Washington Wizards (2026–present)	2012 (39th)	
CJ McCollum	G	September 19, 1991	35 years, 63 days	4 teams: Portland Trail Blazers (2013–2022); New Orleans Pelicans (2022–2025); Washington Wizards (2025–2026); Atlanta Hawks (2026–present)	2013 (10th)	
Tim Hardaway Jr.	G/F	March 16, 1992	34 years, 250 days	6 teams: New York Knicks (2013–2015); Atlanta Hawks (2015–2017); New York Knicks (2017–2019); Dallas Mavericks (2019–2024); Detroit Pistons (2024–2025); Denver Nuggets (2025–2026); Miami Heat (2026–present)	2013 (24th)	
Kyrie Irving	G	March 23, 1992	34 years, 243 days	4 teams: Cleveland Cavaliers (2011–2017); Boston Celtics (2017–2019); Brooklyn Nets (2019–2023); Dallas Mavericks (2023–present)	2011 (1st)	
T. J. McConnell	G	March 25, 1992	34 years, 241 days	2 teams: Philadelphia 76ers (2015–2019); Indiana Pacers (2019–present)	2015 (Undrafted)	
Harrison Barnes	F	May 30, 1992	34 years, 175 days	4 teams: Golden State Warriors (2012–2016); Dallas Mavericks (2016–2019); Sacramento Kings (2019–2024); San Antonio Spurs (2024–present)	2012 (7th)	
Jordan Clarkson	G	June 7, 1992	34 years, 167 days	4 teams: Los Angeles Lakers (2014–2018); Cleveland Cavaliers (2018–2020); Utah Jazz (2020–2025); New York Knicks (2025–present)	2014 (46th)	
Rudy Gobert	C	June 26, 1992	34 years, 148 days	2 teams: Utah Jazz (2013–2022); Minnesota Timberwolves (2022–present)	2013 (27th)	

== Youngest players ==
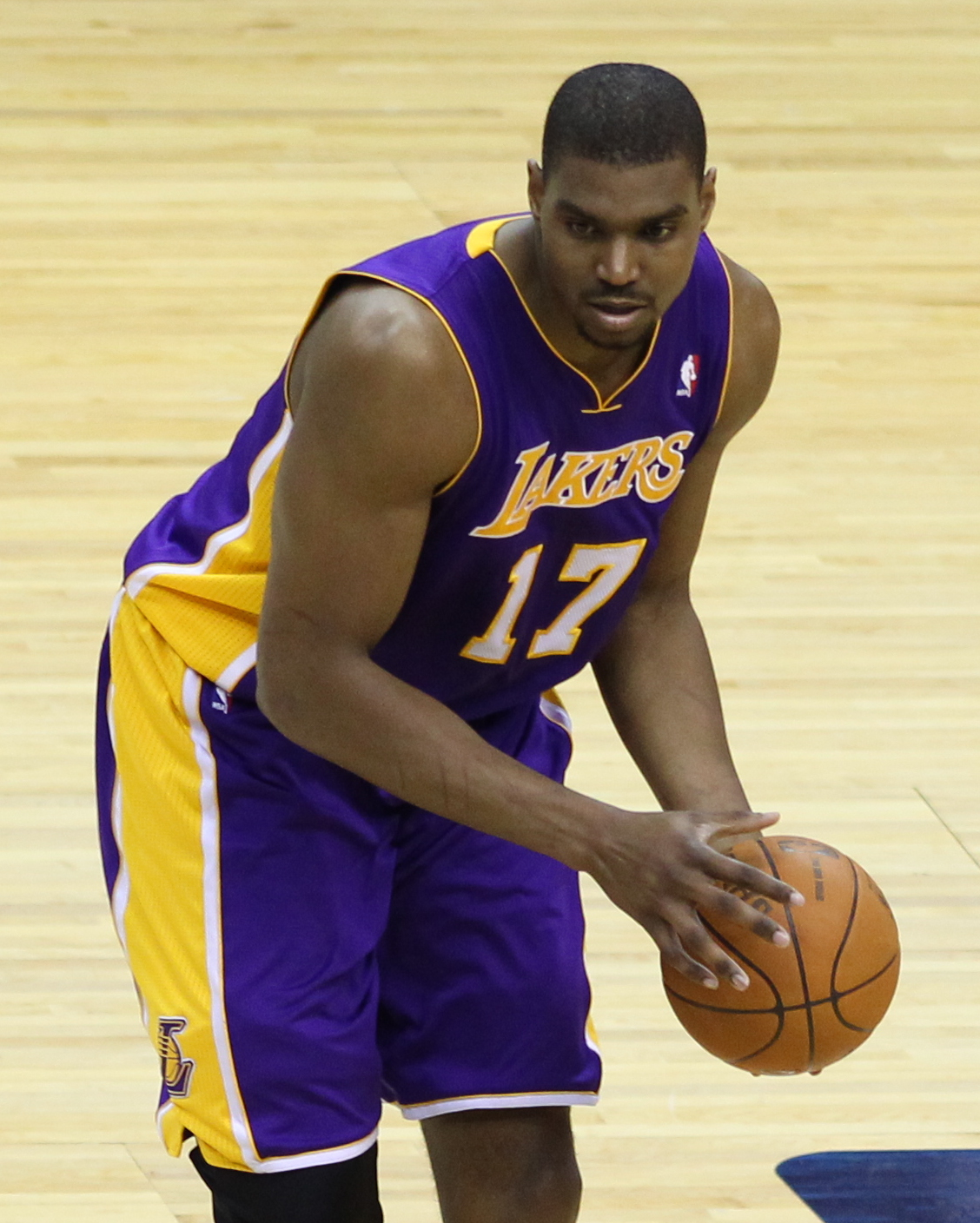
Andrew Bynum is the youngest player to ever play in the NBA.

NBA players usually come from U.S. college basketball. In the past, a college player had to complete his four-year college eligibility before he could enter the league through the NBA draft or as a free agent. In the 1970s, the league began to allow college underclassmen and high school players to enter the league. However, the trend of drafting high school players only began in the mid-1990s. This has led to more younger players entering the league directly after high school graduation. In 2005, the league and the players' union agreed on a new collective bargaining agreement that includes a minimum age limit which requires that players who wish to enter the league must be at least 19 years old on December 31 of the year of the draft, and at least one year removed from high school. International players who did not play college basketball also have to be at least 19 years old on the same date to be able to play in the NBA. Despite a trend toward drafting younger players, the NBA has a higher average age than it had in the 1980s. However, since the NBA introduced the minimum age limit in 2005, the league's average age has decreased in the past few seasons. The youngest player to ever play in the NBA was Andrew Bynum who played his first game at the age of 18 years and 6 days old. Bynum, who was also the youngest player ever selected in the NBA Draft, went into the NBA straight out of high school. Jermaine O'Neal and Kobe Bryant, both drafted in 1996, were the second- and third-youngest players. Serbian Darko Miličić was the youngest player ever to play in an NBA Finals game. He played for the Detroit Pistons in Game 3 of the 2004 Finals at the age of 18 years and 356 days old. The Pistons won the 2004 Finals and Miličić became the youngest player ever to win the NBA championship, being only five days away from his 19th birthday at the time. There are currently 34 players who played in the NBA before they turned 19. Nineteen of them came to the league straight out of high school, while ten of them are international players who never played basketball in U.S. high schools or colleges before they entered the NBA, and five players, Devin Booker, Joshua Primo, Jalen Duren, GG Jackson and Cooper Flagg played one year of college before entering the NBA all while remaining 18 years old throughout the process.

=== All-time ===
^	Denotes player who is still active in the NBA as of the 2026–27 NBA season
*	Denotes player who has been inducted to the Naismith Memorial Basketball Hall of Fame

Player	Pos	Birth date	First game	Age	Team(s) played (years)	Draft (pick)	Ref.
Andrew Bynum	C	October 27, 1987	November 2, 2005	18 years, 6 days	3 teams: Los Angeles Lakers (2005–2012); Cleveland Cavaliers (2013–2014); Indiana Pacers (2014)	2005 (10th)	
Jermaine O'Neal	F/C	October 13, 1978	December 5, 1996	18 years, 53 days	7 teams: Portland Trail Blazers (1996–2000); Indiana Pacers (2000–2008); Toronto Raptors (2008–2009); Miami Heat (2009–2010); Boston Celtics (2010–2012); Phoenix Suns (2012–2013); Golden State Warriors (2013–2014)	1996 (17th)	
Jim Browne	C	October 3, 1930	November 30, 1948	18 years, 58 days	2 teams: Chicago Stags (1948–1949); Denver Nuggets (1949–1950)	Undrafted	
Kobe Bryant*	G	August 23, 1978	November 3, 1996	18 years, 72 days	Los Angeles Lakers (1996–2016)	1996 (13th)	
Darko Miličić	C	June 20, 1985	October 31, 2003	18 years, 133 days	6 teams: Detroit Pistons (2003–2006); Orlando Magic (2006–2007); Memphis Grizzlies (2007–2009); New York Knicks (2009–2010); Minnesota Timberwolves (2010–2012); Boston Celtics (2012)	2003 (2nd)	
Stan Brown	F	June 27, 1929	November 13, 1947	18 years, 139 days	Philadelphia Warriors (1947–1948, 1951–1952)	Undrafted	
Bill Willoughby	F/C	May 20, 1957	October 23, 1975	18 years, 156 days	6 teams: Atlanta Hawks (1975–1977); Buffalo Braves (1977–1978); Cleveland Cavaliers (1979–1980); Houston Rockets (1980–1982); San Antonio Spurs (1982–1983); New Jersey Nets (1983–1984)	1975 (19th)	
Tracy McGrady*	G/F	May 24, 1979	October 31, 1997	18 years, 160 days	7 teams: Toronto Raptors (1997–2000); Orlando Magic (2000–2004); Houston Rockets (2004–2010); New York Knicks (2010); Detroit Pistons (2010–2011); Atlanta Hawks (2011–2012); San Antonio Spurs (2013)	1997 (9th)	
Yaroslav Korolev	F	May 7, 1987	November 4, 2005	18 years, 181 days	Los Angeles Clippers (2005–2007)	2005 (12th)	
Andris Biedriņš	C	April 2, 1986	November 5, 2004	18 years, 217 days	2 teams: Golden State Warriors (2004–2013); Utah Jazz (2013–2014)	2004 (11th)	
C. J. Miles	G/F	March 18, 1987	November 14, 2005	18 years, 241 days	7 teams: Utah Jazz (2005–2012); Cleveland Cavaliers (2012–2014); Indiana Pacers (2014–2017); Toronto Raptors (2017–2019); Memphis Grizzlies (2019); Washington Wizards (2019–2020); Boston Celtics (2021)	2005 (34th)	
Amir Johnson	F	May 1, 1987	January 24, 2006	18 years, 268 days	4 teams: Detroit Pistons (2005–2009); Toronto Raptors (2009–2015); Boston Celtics (2015–2017); Philadelphia 76ers (2017–2019)	2005 (56th)	
Darryl Dawkins	C	January 11, 1957	October 27, 1975	18 years, 289 days	4 teams: Philadelphia 76ers (1975–1982); New Jersey Nets (1982–1987); Utah Jazz (1987); Detroit Pistons (1987–1989)	1975 (5th)	
Joe Graboski	F/C	January 15, 1930	November 6, 1948	18 years, 296 days	6 teams: Chicago Stags (1948–1950); Indianapolis Olympians (1951–1953); Philadelphia Warriors (1953–1961); St. Louis Hawks (1961); Chicago Packers (1961); Syracuse Nationals (1961–1962)	Undrafted	
Ulrich Chomche	C	December 30, 2005	October 23, 2024	18 years, 298 days	Toronto Raptors (2024–2025)	2024 (57th)	
Joshua Primo	G	December 24, 2002	October 20, 2021	18 years, 300 days	2 teams: San Antonio Spurs (2021–2022); Los Angeles Clippers (2023–2024)	2021 (12th)	
LeBron James^	F	December 30, 1984	October 29, 2003	18 years, 303 days	4 teams: Cleveland Cavaliers (2003–2010); Miami Heat (2010–2014); Cleveland Cavaliers (2014–2018); Los Angeles Lakers (2018–2026); Philadelphia 76ers (2026–present)	2003 (1st)	
Cooper Flagg^	F	December 21, 2006	October 22, 2025	18 years, 305 days	Dallas Mavericks (2025–present)	2025 (1st)	
Jonathan Bender	F	January 30, 1981	December 10, 1999	18 years, 314 days	2 teams: Indiana Pacers (1999–2006); New York Knicks (2009–2010)	1999 (5th)	
GG Jackson^	F/C	December 17, 2004	October 30, 2023	18 years, 317 days	Memphis Grizzlies (2023–present)	2023 (45th)	
Giannis Antetokounmpo^	F	December 6, 1994	October 30, 2013	18 years, 328 days	2 teams: Milwaukee Bucks (2013–2026); Miami Heat (2026–present)	2013 (15th)	
Eddy Curry	C	December 5, 1982	October 31, 2001	18 years, 330 days	4 teams: Chicago Bulls (2001–2005); New York Knicks (2005–2011); Miami Heat (2011–2012); Dallas Mavericks (2012)	2001 (4th)	
Dwight Howard*	C	December 8, 1985	November 3, 2004	18 years, 331 days	7 teams: Orlando Magic (2004–2012); Los Angeles Lakers (2012–2013); Houston Rockets (2013–2016); Atlanta Hawks (2016–2017); Charlotte Hornets (2017–2018); Washington Wizards (2018–2019); Los Angeles Lakers (2019–2020); Philadelphia 76ers (2020–2021); Los Angeles Lakers (2021–2022)	2004 (1st)	
Josh Smith	F	December 5, 1985	November 3, 2004	18 years, 334 days	5 teams: Atlanta Hawks (2004–2013); Detroit Pistons (2013–2014); Houston Rockets (2014–2015); Los Angeles Clippers (2015–2016); Houston Rockets (2016); New Orleans Pelicans (2017)	2004 (17th)	
Jalen Duren^	C	November 18, 2003	October 19, 2022	18 years, 335 days	Detroit Pistons (2022–present)	2022 (13th)	
Sekou Doumbouya	F	December 23, 2000	November 23, 2019	18 years, 335 days	2 teams: Detroit Pistons (2019–2021); Los Angeles Lakers (2021–2022)	2019 (15th)	
Martell Webster	G/F	December 4, 1986	November 4, 2005	18 years, 335 days	3 teams: Portland Trail Blazers (2005–2010); Minnesota Timberwolves (2010–2012); Washington Wizards (2012–2015)	2005 (6th)	
Robert Swift	C	December 3, 1985	November 3, 2004	18 years, 336 days	Seattle SuperSonics / Oklahoma City Thunder (2004–2009)	2004 (12th)	
Noa Essengue^	F	December 18, 2006	November 22, 2025	18 years, 339 days	Chicago Bulls (2025–present)	2025 (12th)	
Dragan Bender	F/C	November 17, 1997	October 26, 2016	18 years, 344 days	3 teams: Phoenix Suns (2016–2019); Milwaukee Bucks (2019–2020); Golden State Warriors (2020)	2016 (4th)	
Joan Beringer^	C	November 11, 2006	October 24, 2025	18 years, 347 days	Minnesota Timberwolves (2025–present)	2025 (17th)	
Maciej Lampe	F	February 5, 1985	January 23, 2004	18 years, 352 days	3 teams: Phoenix Suns (2004–2005); New Orleans Hornets (2005–2006); Houston Rockets (2006)	2003 (30th)	
Al Harrington	F	February 17, 1980	February 5, 1999	18 years, 353 days	7 teams: Indiana Pacers (1998–2004); Atlanta Hawks (2004–2006); Indiana Pacers (2006–2007); Golden State Warriors (2007–2008); New York Knicks (2008–2010); Denver Nuggets (2010–2012); Orlando Magic (2012–2013); Washington Wizards (2013–2014)	1998 (25th)	
Devin Booker^	G	October 30, 1996	October 28, 2015	18 years, 363 days	Phoenix Suns (2015–present)	2015 (13th)	

=== Active ===
This list shows the 20 youngest active players in the current season who have appeared in an NBA game.

Player	Pos	Birth date	Age	Team(s) played (years)	Draft (pick)	Ref.
Cameron Boozer	F	July 18, 2007	19 years, 126 days	Memphis Grizzlies (2026–present)	2026 (3rd)	
Karim López	F	April 12, 2007	19 years, 223 days	Memphis Grizzlies (2026–present)	2026 (21st)	
Ebuka Okorie	G	April 10, 2007	19 years, 225 days	Detroit Pistons (2026–present)	2026 (17th)	
Keaton Wagler	G	February 3, 2007	19 years, 291 days	Los Angeles Clippers (2026–present)	2026 (5th)	
Chris Cenac	F/C	February 1, 2007	19 years, 293 days	Boston Celtics (2026–present)	2026 (27th)	
AJ Dybantsa	F	January 29, 2007	19 years, 296 days	Washington Wizards (2026–present)	2026 (1st)	
Koa Peat	F	January 20, 2007	19 years, 305 days	Phoenix Suns (2026–present)	2026 (30th)	
Darryn Peterson	G	January 17, 2007	19 years, 308 days	Utah Jazz (2026–present)	2026 (2nd)	
Kingston Flemings	G	January 3, 2007	19 years, 322 days	Atlanta Hawks (2026–present)	2026 (8th)	
Cooper Flagg	F	December 21, 2006	19 years, 335 days	Dallas Mavericks (2025–present)	2025 (1st)	
Noa Essengue	F	December 18, 2006	19 years, 338 days	Chicago Bulls (2025–present)	2025 (12th)	
Nate Ament	F	December 10, 2006	19 years, 346 days	Milwaukee Bucks (2026–present)	2026 (13th)	
Darius Acuff Jr.	G	November 16, 2006	20 years, 5 days	Sacramento Kings (2026–present)	2026 (7th)	
Joan Beringer	C	November 11, 2006	20 years, 10 days	Minnesota Timberwolves (2025–present)	2025 (17th)	
Jeremiah Fears	G	October 14, 2006	20 years, 38 days	New Orleans Pelicans (2025–present)	2025 (7th)	
Khaman Maluach	C	September 14, 2006	20 years, 68 days	Phoenix Suns (2025–present)	2025 (10th)	
Ace Bailey	F	August 13, 2006	20 years, 100 days	Utah Jazz (2025–present)	2025 (5th)	
Meleek Thomas	G	August 6, 2006	20 years, 107 days	Cleveland Cavaliers (2026–present)	2026 (34th)	
Allen Graves	F	July 28, 2006	20 years, 116 days	Toronto Raptors (2026–present)	2026 (19th)	
Caleb Wilson	F	July 18, 2006	20 years, 126 days	Chicago Bulls (2026–present)	2026 (4th)	

== See also ==
- NBA records
- List of NBA career games played leaders
- List of NBA seasons played leaders
- List of oldest professional athletes by sport
- List of oldest Major League Baseball players
- List of oldest National Hockey League players
