= Jim Browne =

American basketball player (1930–2003)

Personal information
- Born: October 3, 1930 Midlothian, Illinois, U.S.
- Died: April 23, 2003 (aged 72) Titusville, Florida, U.S.
- Listed height: 6 ft 10 in (2.08 m)
- Listed weight: 235 lb (107 kg)

Career information
- High school: Tilden (Chicago, Illinois)
- Playing career: 1948–1950
- Position: Center
- Number: 18, 30, 29

Career history
- 1948: Chicago Stags
- 1949–1950: Denver Nuggets
- Stats at NBA.com
- Stats at Basketball Reference

James Frederick Browne (October 3, 1930 – April 23, 2003) was an American professional basketball player. He played for the Chicago Stags (1948–49) and Denver Nuggets (1949–50) in the BAA and NBA for 35 games.

== BAA/NBA career statistics ==
Legend
GP	Games played	FG%	Field-goal percentage
FT%	Free-throw percentage	APG	Assists per game
PPG	Points per game	**Bold**	Career high

=== Regular season ===
Year	Team	GP	FG%	FT%	APG	PPG
1948–49	Chicago	4	**.500**	**.500**	.0	.8
1949–50	Denver	**31**	.354	.481	**.3**	**1.5**
Career		35	.360	.483	.2	1.4

== See also ==
- List of oldest and youngest NBA players
