= Jermaine O'Neal =

American basketball player (born 1978)

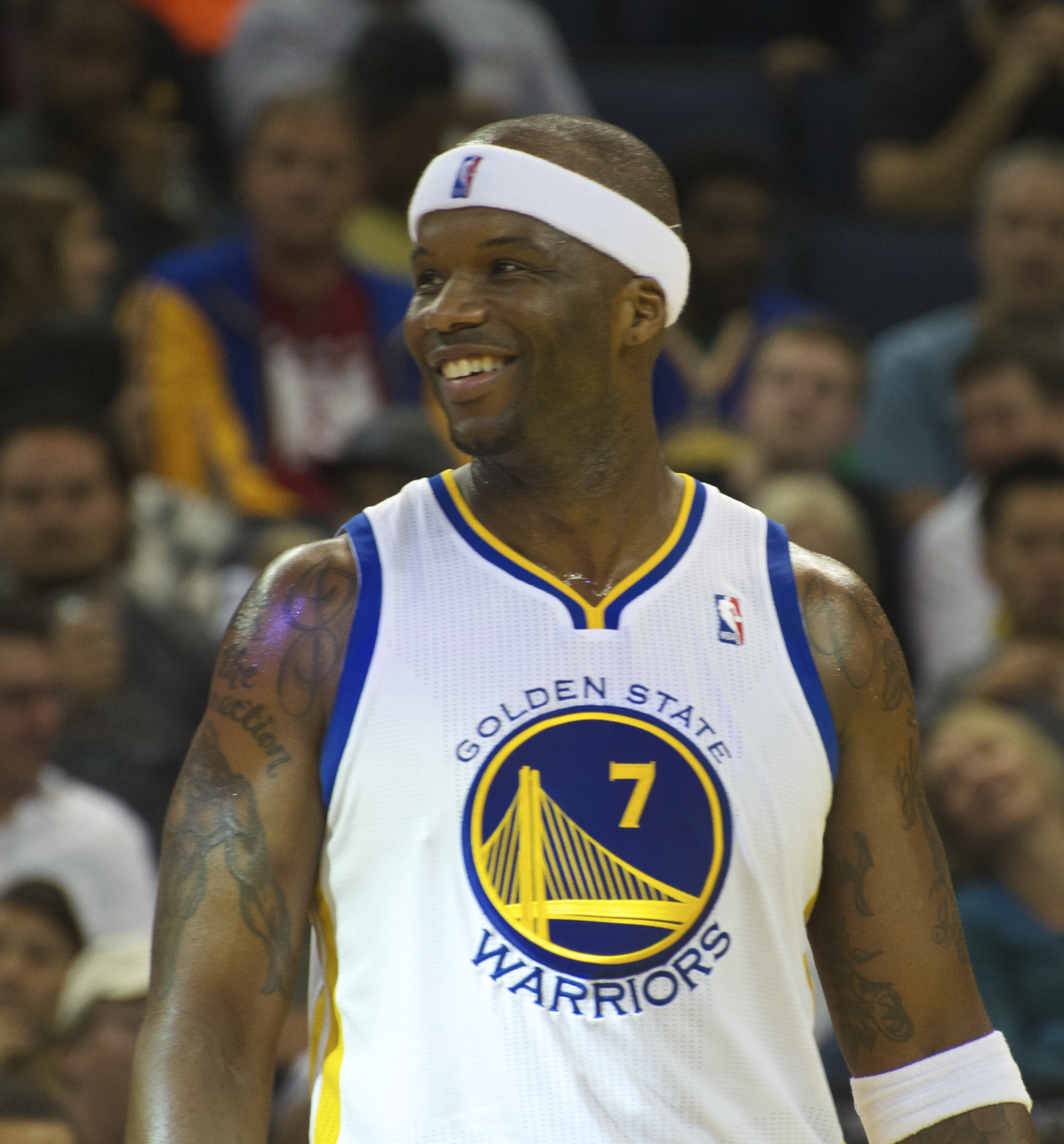
- O'Neal with the Golden State Warriors in 2014

Personal information
- Born: October 13, 1978 (age 48) Columbia, South Carolina, U.S.
- Listed height: 6 ft 11 in (2.11 m)
- Listed weight: 255 lb (116 kg)

Career information
- High school: Eau Claire (Columbia, South Carolina)
- NBA draft: 1996: 1st round, 17th overall pick
- Drafted by: Portland Trail Blazers
- Playing career: 1996–2014
- Position: Center / power forward
- Number: 5, 6, 7, 20

Career history
- 1996–2000: Portland Trail Blazers
- 2000–2008: Indiana Pacers
- 2008–2009: Toronto Raptors
- 2009–2010: Miami Heat
- 2010–2012: Boston Celtics
- 2012–2013: Phoenix Suns
- 2013–2014: Golden State Warriors

Career highlights
- 6× NBA All-Star (2002–2007); All-NBA Second Team (2004); 2× All-NBA Third Team (2002, 2003); NBA Most Improved Player (2002); First-team Parade All-American (1996); Third-team Parade All-American (1995); McDonald's All-American (1996); South Carolina Mr. Basketball (1996)

Career statistics
- Points: 13,309 (13.2 ppg)
- Rebounds: 7,261 (7.2 rpg)
- Blocks: 1,820 (1.8 bpg)
- Stats at NBA.com
- Stats at Basketball Reference
Medals
Men's basketball
Representing United States
FIBA Americas Championship
Gold medal – first place	2003 San Juan	National team
Goodwill Games
Gold medal – first place	2001 Brisbane	National team

Jermaine Lee O'Neal Sr. (born October 13, 1978) is an American former professional basketball player. A center/power forward, he had a successful high school career and declared his eligibility for the 1996 NBA draft straight out of high school. O'Neal, at just 17 years of age, was selected by the Portland Trail Blazers with the 17th overall pick, and played his first professional game at 18. At the time, he was the youngest player to ever play an NBA game.

O'Neal was unable to break into the first team in Portland and was traded to the Indiana Pacers in 2000. In his eight seasons with the team, he was voted an NBA All-Star six times, made the All-NBA teams three times, and was voted the NBA Most Improved Player in the 2001–02 season. O'Neal also helped Indiana reach the NBA playoffs six times, including the Eastern Conference Finals in the 2003–04 season. O'Neal was traded to the Toronto Raptors before the 2008–09 season began, and later played for the Miami Heat, the Boston Celtics and the Phoenix Suns. O'Neal's final NBA season was the 2013–14 season, which he spent with the Golden State Warriors.

== Early life ==
O'Neal was born in Columbia, South Carolina. He and his older brother, Clifford, were raised by their mother, Angela Ocean. Ocean worked hard to support her sons and left her children largely to their own devices. O'Neal found his love for athletics at a young age. Tall and quick, he enjoyed both American football and basketball, but basketball was his favorite sport. Two of his basketball heroes are Hakeem Olajuwon and Bill Russell; O'Neal often marveled at Olajuwon's approach to the game, while he loved watching Russell's video highlights of his duels with Wilt Chamberlain.

== High school career ==
Each summer, O'Neal would play for an AAU team and impressed onlookers with his athleticism and his ability to handle the ball with both hands. By the time he turned 14, the 6 ft 4 in (1.93 m) O'Neal—now a confident guard who could drain three-pointers—entered Eau Claire High School as a freshman in 1992. In his first meeting with basketball coach George Glymph, he made the bold promise to become the best player in the school's history. While O'Neal's first season was hardly noteworthy (he even played as quarterback for the Eau Claire team) things changed when he grew five inches over the next year and a half, and he was inspired to develop into a defensive powerhouse like his idol, Bill Russell. Glymph built his team's defense around O'Neal, and Eau Claire featured one of the most imposing frontcourts around. With O'Neal averaging 18 points, 12 rebounds and 9 blocks a game, Eau Claire captured its third straight 3A state title in 1995.

The following July, the 16-year-old was able to raise his profile yet again. At an ABCD summer basketball camp, he outplayed Tim Thomas, a rising star at that time. Before long, recruiting letters from various top colleges came pouring in. O'Neal, however, also faced great pressure off the court. That same year, the District Attorney contemplated prosecuting him for rape after he and his 15-year-old girlfriend were found partially nude in bed together by her father. The DA eventually did not prosecute O'Neal, but as the latter struggled to cope with the pressure on and off the court, Glymph stepped in, introducing discipline to his life and keeping his feet to the ground. At the same time, O'Neal's mother had met a new man, Abraham Kennedy, who also guided O'Neal along.

In his senior season at Eau Claire, O'Neal's averages of 22.4 points, 12.4 rebounds and 5.2 blocks per game ensured that he was voted First Team All-State, South Carolina's Player of the Year and "Mr. Basketball". Named to USA Today's All-USA Basketball Team, he earned a spot in the McDonald's All-American Game as well. Despite being one of the nation's top prospects, O'Neal's future in college basketball was uncertain. He scored poorly on the SATs, and Glymph advised against him making the leap to the NBA. But it was only a year before that another South Carolinian—future NBA All-Star and Hall of Famer Kevin Garnett—had made a seamless transition from high school to the NBA, and O'Neal thought he could emulate Garnett.

== Professional career ==
=== Portland Trail Blazers (1996–2000) ===
O'Neal was selected by the Portland Trail Blazers as the 17th pick in the 1996 NBA draft. The rookie was surrounded by veterans and emerging stars who could show him the ropes in Portland; forming the frontcourt with him were Arvydas Sabonis, Rasheed Wallace and Cliff Robinson. After missing the first 17 games with a bone contusion in his knee, O'Neal made his debut against the Denver Nuggets in December. At 18 years, one month and 22 days, he became the youngest player to play in an NBA game (a mark that was later eclipsed by Andrew Bynum). O'Neal also became the youngest player at 18 years, three months and eleven days to score 20 points in a game on January 22, 1997, against the Seattle SuperSonics.

==== 1996–97 season ====
Portland was mediocre in the first half of the campaign, but came to form as the playoffs approached and managed to finish third in the Pacific Division with a 49–33 win–loss record. While fans at the Rose Garden harbored thoughts of an upset against the Los Angeles Lakers in the first round of the playoffs, the Trail Blazers succumbed in four games. In O'Neal's first season, he appeared in a total of 45 games in the regular season, averaging 4.1 points and 2.8 rebounds per game. For the most part, however, he came off the bench and only averaged 10.2 minutes a game. O'Neal doubted for a while if he had made the right decision to skip college—he watched with envy as good friend and fellow prep-to-pro draftee Kobe Bryant was enjoying a good rookie season—but he remained confident that the best had yet to come.

==== 1997–98 season ====
Despite his optimism, O'Neal found it difficult to break into the first team the following season. Brian Grant was acquired from free agency and new coach Mike Dunleavy Sr. planned to use Sabonis, Wallace and Grant as the starting frontcourt, while the presence of veteran Gary Trent also further reduced the sophomore's chances. Thus, O'Neal was not given meaningful minutes in the early part of the campaign, although he showed glimpses of his potential with occasional double double performances when he returned from an early-season injury. Portland eventually produced a similar win–loss record as the preceding season with 46 wins, finishing fourth in the division. In the playoffs, Dunleavy opted to go with a more youthful lineup: before the trade deadline, he had acquired point guard Damon Stoudamire, as well as forwards Carlos Rogers and Walt Williams. The move was designed to bolster the team's chances in the playoffs against teams that were bigger and more physical. Nevertheless, for the second time in two years, the Trail Blazers were eliminated by the Lakers in four games in the first round. And just like the season before, O'Neal hardly featured for Portland, playing only three minutes in one game.

==== 1998–99 season ====
The 1998–99 season was initially disrupted for several months following an impasse in the collective bargaining negotiations. In the end, the league scaled down to a 50-game schedule, and Portland capitalized on the shortened campaign. Boasting one of the league's most balanced squads that also had strength in depth, the Trail Blazers chalked up an impressive 35–15 record and topped the division. Dunleavy—who would later be named NBA Coach of the Year—led his club into the playoffs aiming to capture the franchise's first NBA title since 1977. After sweeping the Phoenix Suns 3–0 in the first round, Portland defeated the Utah Jazz 4–2 to set up a showdown with the San Antonio Spurs in the Western Conference Finals. In game 2, a 3-pointer by Sean Elliott in the closing seconds gave the Spurs an 86–85 win and propelled San Antonio to win the series (the Spurs went on to win the NBA championship). O'Neal's disappointment at losing in the Conference Finals was compounded by the fact that his regular-season minutes had dropped to fewer than 10 a game for the first time, and that his contributions to the team were mostly insignificant, to begin with. He was having increasing doubts about his NBA career.

==== 1999–00 season ====
However, in an unexpected move, Portland showed their willingness to invest in O'Neal by offering him a four-year contract worth $24 million. However, the new deal did not translate into more playing time for the power forward in the 1999–2000 season. Portland acquired Detlef Schrempf, Scottie Pippen, and Steve Smith during the 1999 offseason, which meant that O'Neal was once again consigned to the bench. His statistics remained unimpressive, averaging 3.9 points and 3.3 rebounds per game during the regular season. In the meantime, the Trail Blazers continued to build on the success of their previous campaign. They notched 59 wins in the regular season, and defeated the Minnesota Timberwolves and the Utah Jazz en route to reaching the Western Conference Finals. Up against recent perennial rivals the Los Angeles Lakers, the team relinquished a 15-point lead in the fourth quarter of the pivotal game 7, and lost 89–84. O'Neal was not heavily involved in any of this action, however. With back-to-back Conference Finals disappointments coupled with a lack of playing time, he soon announced his intention to be traded. The Trail Blazers relented in the end and sent him to the Indiana Pacers alongside Joe Kleine in exchange for NBA All-Star Dale Davis.

=== Indiana Pacers (2000–2008) ===
==== 2000–01 season: First season with the Pacers ====
The trade was greeted with surprise by the Indiana fans as the Pacers had just come off an appearance in the 2000 NBA Finals, and the trade involved losing a quality player for an unproven commodity in O'Neal. The Pacers roster also saw the departures of Mark Jackson, Rik Smits and Chris Mullin, and even coach Larry Bird stepped down. All of this meant that O'Neal arrived in Indianapolis facing intense pressure and scrutiny. When O'Neal arrived at his new club, new coach Isiah Thomas—who had pushed for the O'Neal/Davis trade—told him that he simply needed to work harder on his game to succeed. At that time, Indiana was rebuilding and still revolved around veteran All-Star Reggie Miller. O'Neal turned out to be a revelation for his new club and it was not long before he established himself as a key player for his new team. Starting in 80 of the 81 regular-season games he played in for the 2000–01 season, his statistics improved significantly as he averaged 12.9 points and 9.8 rebounds per game. The big man helped his team to a 41–41 record and the eighth playoff seed; he also led the league in total blocks (228, a franchise record), and led the Eastern Conference in double-doubles. O'Neal kept up his form into the playoffs as well, averaging almost 9.8 points and 12.5 boards a game in the first round against the Philadelphia 76ers, although the playoff run was short-lived as the 76ers defeated the Pacers in the best-of-five first round series 3 games to 1.

==== 2001–02 season: First All-Star and Most Improved Player ====
I'm OK with my ability right now, but I can get a whole lot better. I want to get to the point where I can destroy the entire league.

— O'Neal on winning Most Improved Player

The 2001–02 season proved to be the breakthrough season for O'Neal as he earned a trio of honors: winning the NBA Most Improved Player Award, being named an NBA All-Star, and making the All-NBA Third Team (becoming the second Pacer in history to do so after Reggie Miller). Leading his team in scoring (19.0) and rebounding (10.5), he chalked up 39 double-doubles, which was third best in the conference and eighth best in the league. Indiana recorded 42 wins and qualified for the playoffs once again as the eighth seed, where they faced one of the hottest teams in the league at that time, the New Jersey Nets. The Pacers lost the series in 5 games, despite forcing overtime twice. The Nets decided to put Kenyon Martin on O'Neal after the latter put up a 30-point, 11-rebound performance in game 1, and they succeeded by limiting him to just 17.2 points and 7.6 rebounds per game for the rest of the series. As the Pacers reflected on yet another premature end to the postseason, they knew that O'Neal was next in line to succeed the 36-year-old Miller as the new face of the franchise. At the same time, the Pacers seemed to have found players in Brad Miller, Ron Artest, Al Harrington and Jamaal Tinsley who complemented O'Neal. Indiana was on the brink of becoming a legitimate threat in the East.

==== 2002–03 season: Franchise player ====
The Pacers started the 2002–03 season well, winning 14 of their first 16 games, and had the best record in the East by the time the All-Star break arrived. The same team from the year before was playing better than ever, but the season fell apart in the latter half. For one, Brad Miller got injured and Indiana lost one of their most versatile players. Defensive lynchpin Artest suffered from too many emotional outbursts and this further hurt the Pacers, who could only finish the season 48–34. On his part, O'Neal kept up his All-Star numbers, averaging 20.8 points and 10.3 rebounds per game, being only one of three players in the NBA that year to pull off a 20/10. He was voted Eastern Conference Player of the Month twice, in January and April, and would go on to be named to the All-NBA Third Team again by the season's end. With no momentum heading into the playoffs, however, the Pacers were eliminated 4–2 by the underdog Boston Celtics led by Paul Pierce, marking a first-round elimination for the third year in a row. Off the court, the team had also been facing family problems. Brad Miller's father-in-law and Tinsley's mother died during the season, and just before the playoffs, O'Neal's stepfather attempted suicide. When the season ended, O'Neal tried to keep his focus on basketball and considered the possibility of joining another team since he was now a free agent. The San Antonio Spurs, led by two-time NBA champion Tim Duncan, looked an interesting proposition as perennial All-Star David Robinson had just retired. Much as it was tempting for O'Neal to make the switch, he opted not to uproot his family and signed a seven-year, $126 million contract with the Pacers. Even so, the offseason produced a few surprises for O'Neal when Isiah Thomas was replaced by Rick Carlisle, and Brad Miller left for the Sacramento Kings. Indiana was undergoing rebuilding yet again.

==== 2003–04 season: Best record in the NBA and franchise record ====
Despite all the changes, O'Neal spearheaded the Pacers to a league-best 61–21 record in the 2003–04 season. He remained a constant double-double threat, averaging 20.1 points and 10.0 rebounds a game in the regular season. He also continued to rack up individual honors, making his third All-Star trip and being named to the All-NBA Second Team. He finished third in NBA Most Valuable Player Award voting. Artest was instrumental to the team's success too as he enjoyed a breakthrough season, netting his first All-Star berth as well as the NBA Defensive Player of the Year Award. In the playoffs, Indiana gained revenge from the preceding season by sweeping Paul Pierce and the Boston Celtics in the first round, before defeating the Miami Heat led by Dwyane Wade in the next. That sent them back to the Eastern Conference Finals for the sixth time in 11 years, where they were disposed of by eventual NBA champions Detroit Pistons. In the series-deciding sixth game, O'Neal endured a sprained knee and managed to tally 20 points and 10 rebounds, but Richard Hamilton's inspired play ensured a close victory for the Pistons.

==== 2004–05 season: Suspension and career high in scoring ====
The Pacers looked to build on their previous campaign in the 2004–05 season, but all their plans came apart on November 19. In a game against the Pistons at The Palace of Auburn Hills, a brawl named "The Malice at the Palace" broke out that spilled into the stands, after a fan threw a drink on Indiana Pacer Ron Artest. O'Neal was one of the Pacers who fought with two fans who came onto the court; he ran to defend teammate Ron Artest and punched one of the fans in the head so hard that teammate Scot Pollard and sportscaster Jim Gray feared that O'Neal would kill the fan. As he and his Pacer teammates left the court, many enraged fans threw snacks, drinks, and even a folding chair at O'Neal. In response to O'Neal's actions during the brawl, NBA Commissioner David Stern suspended him for 25 games; teammates Artest and Stephen Jackson were suspended for the rest of the season and 30 games, respectively. Following an appeal just before Christmas, O'Neal won a ten-game reduction in his sentence, but this did not mitigate the damage that Indiana had already suffered. Stripped of three of its core players, the team hobbled to a 44–38 record and the sixth seed. O'Neal appeared in only 44 games, his lowest total ever with Indiana. Although his scoring average improved to 24.3 points per game, his rebounding dropped and he was no longer the same intimidating presence on defense. Things worsened when he sprained his right shoulder in March and played sparingly for the remainder of the regular season, while hoping to recover in time for the playoffs. The Pacers drew the Paul Pierce-led Celtics in the first round, and managed to salvage their season by winning the series 4–3. O'Neal's offensive output dropped, and he shot poorly from the field. When the Pacers met the Pistons in the second round of the playoffs, they were eliminated in six games.

==== Battling injuries and missing playoffs (2005–08) ====
O'Neal continued his battle against injuries during the 2005–06 season, and played in only 51 games. Nevertheless, he averaged a team-high 20.1 points and 9.3 rebounds a game. and was voted by the fans as the starting forward for the Eastern Conference All-Star team (he was later replaced by Gilbert Arenas due to injury). The Pacers entered the playoffs as the sixth seed. They eventually lost to the New Jersey Nets in six games.

O'Neal missed 13 more games in the 2006–07 season as the Pacers missed the playoffs altogether. O'Neal continued to miss huge amounts of time, especially towards the end of the season, as the Pacers struggled to compete. O'Neal's production and stats declined as well. He had two years and $44 million left on his deal. The Pacers were looking to move the huge contract. On June 25, 2008, it was reported that O'Neal and the 41st pick in the 2008 NBA draft, Nathan Jawai would be sent to Toronto for T. J. Ford, Rasho Nesterovič, Maceo Baston and the 17th pick in the 2008 NBA draft (Roy Hibbert). The trade was finalized on July 9, 2008.

=== Toronto Raptors (2008–2009) ===
I didn't make the playoffs the last two years, had two really tough years physically and mentally, it doesn't really matter. The personal accomplishments don't matter. I understand what I need to do for this team to be successful and sometimes they're not going to need me to score. They need me to bring the defensive presence.

— O'Neal, before the 2008–09 season

O'Neal was given jersey #6 for the Raptors since his number with the Pacers (#7) was already owned by Andrea Bargnani. While he was expected to combine with Toronto's three-time All-Star Chris Bosh to form a strong frontcourt and provide greater rebounding and interior defense for the Raptors, O'Neal's arrival was dwarfed by the Elton Brand signing pulled off by division rivals Philadelphia. O'Neal wasted no time in imposing his style on his new team: in the season opener at Philadelphia, he pointed to hecklers in the home crowd after making a dunk; in the team's second game, Toronto's center blocked a dunk from Golden State's Brandan Wright and thereafter waved a finger in disapproval. Even so, it took O'Neal some time to find his offensive game: he reached the 20-point mark just twice in his first 23 games, before notching three straight thereafter. By the All-Star break, injuries had ruled the big man out for almost a quarter of Toronto's games, while Bargnani regained his starting spot with a streak of solid performances. This, coupled with the Raptors entering the break placed 14th in the conference and 13 games under .500, Toronto General Manager Bryan Colangelo looked to move O'Neal to bring in a wing player and free up salary space.

On February 13, 2009, O'Neal and Jamario Moon were traded to Miami for Shawn Marion and Marcus Banks; the latter two had been traded to Miami a year earlier for Shaquille O'Neal. In his 41 games as a Raptor, O'Neal averaged 13.5 points, 7 rebounds and 2 blocks per game.

=== Miami Heat (2009–2010) ===
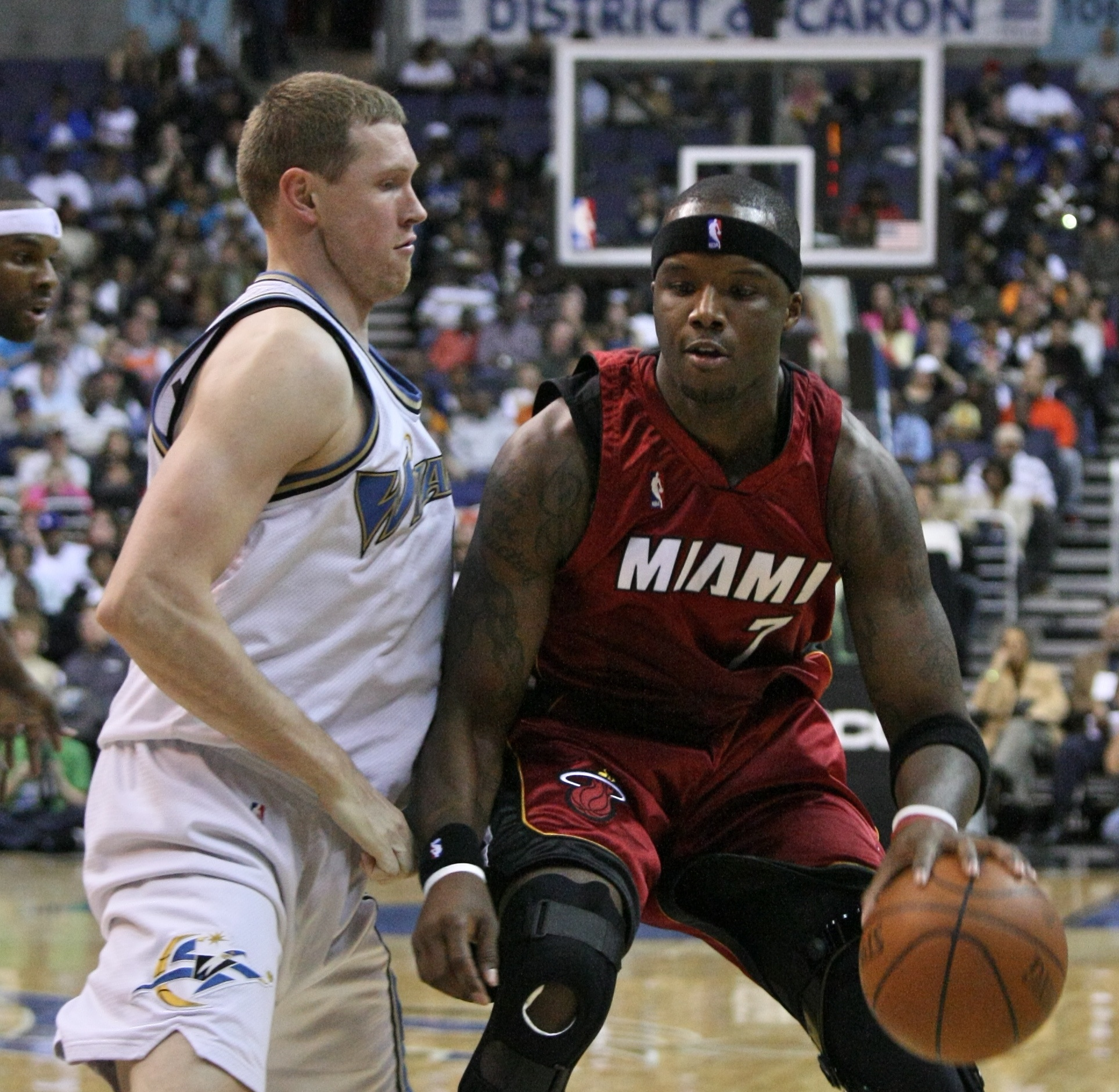
O'Neal spent one-and-a-half seasons with the Miami Heat.

The Heat went 7–5 in O'Neal's first 12 games with his new club—including a victory over the Raptors at the Air Canada Centre—as they looked to secure the fourth seed for the playoffs. The Heat eventually concluded the regular season with a 43–39 record and was seeded fifth. In the first round of the playoffs, the Atlanta Hawks defeated the Heat in seven games.

In the 2009–10 season, O'Neal started in all 70 games he played in and produced numbers identical to his career averages. Miami concluded the regular season as the fifth seed for the playoffs, and were up against the Boston Celtics. Boston won the series 4–1.

=== Boston Celtics (2010–2012) ===
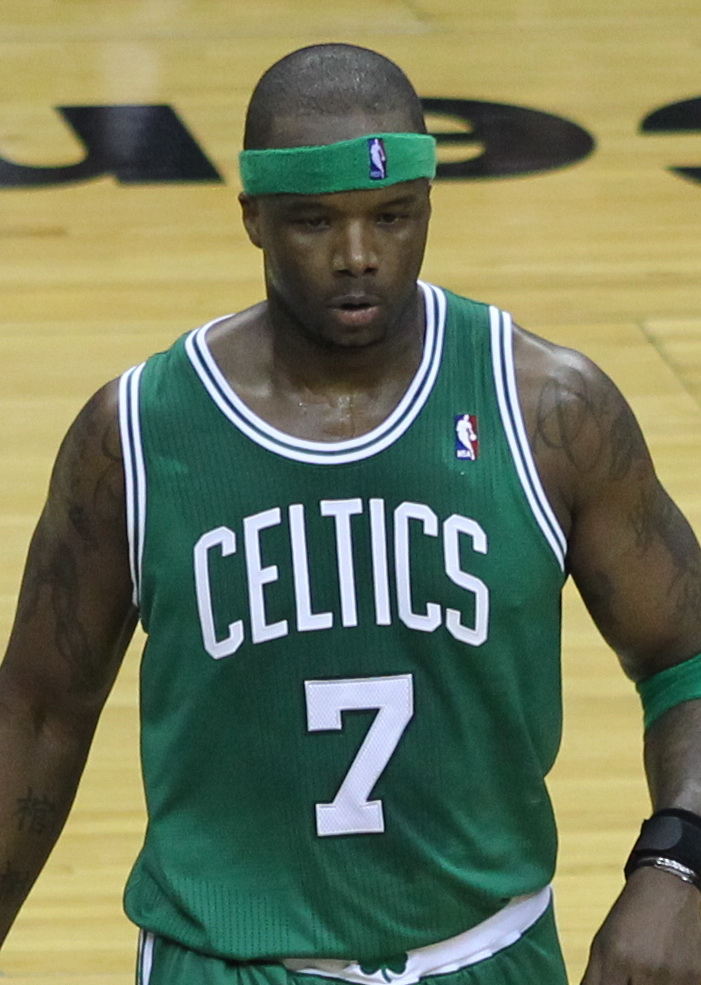
O'Neal with the Celtics in 2011

On July 14, 2010, O'Neal signed a two-year deal with the Boston Celtics. He had a difficult season with his new team, missing 58 regular-season games with left knee and left wrist injuries, playing only 24 games and started in 10 of them, averaging 5.4 points, 3.7 rebounds and 1.3 blocks in 18.0 minutes per game. O'Neal came back in the starting line-up for the 2011 NBA playoffs. Boston (third seed) faced the New York Knicks in the first round. O'Neal had a good series, especially in game 1 with 12 points and 5 blocks. Boston swept the Knicks, but lost to the eventual Eastern Conference champions, the Miami Heat, in the second round in five games.

On April 20, 2012, he was waived by the Celtics following season-ending wrist surgery. In 25 games, he averaged 5.0 points, 5.4 rebounds and 1.7 blocks per game.

=== Phoenix Suns (2012–2013) ===
On August 15, 2012, O'Neal signed a one-year contract with the Phoenix Suns. O'Neal cited the Suns' training staff as a major factor in his decision to sign with the team. He has been considered the leader around the locker room to replace the likes of Steve Nash and Grant Hill. As a result, O'Neal became a new captain of the team along with Jared Dudley.

On November 21, 2012, O'Neal scored 17 points off of 7 of 9 shooting off the bench to help defeat the Portland Trail Blazers 114–87. Two days later, O'Neal would record his first double-double with the Suns by scoring 13 points and grabbing 11 rebounds in a close 111–108 overtime victory over the New Orleans Hornets.

On January 23, 2013, O'Neal was sidelined by an irregular heartbeat. O'Neal would return on February 5, 2013, against the Memphis Grizzlies before the All-Star break.

On February 27, 2013, O'Neal scored 22 points and grabbed 13 rebounds in a 105–101 overtime victory against the San Antonio Spurs. In March 2013, O'Neal took time off from the team to be with his daughter, Asjia, who underwent surgery to repair a leaky heart valve.

=== Golden State Warriors (2013–2014) ===
On July 23, 2013, O'Neal signed with the Golden State Warriors. On December 13, 2013, O'Neal underwent surgery to repair a torn ligament in his right wrist. He returned to action on February 4, 2014.

Feeling exhausted, O'Neal decided to sit out the 2014–15 NBA season. Despite receiving interest from several teams during the season, O'Neal remained out of action and instead decided to focus on his family. In February 2016, O'Neal noted that he had not yet officially retired from the NBA.

== National team career ==
Following his breakout season in 2000–01, O'Neal earned a spot on Team USA for the 2001 Goodwill Games. The Americans won all of their five games and the gold medal, and O'Neal led the team in blocks and shooting percentage, while finishing second in points and rebounds. The 2002 NBA Most Improved Player was selected to represent his nation again in the 2002 World Basketball Championship which was held in Indianapolis. This time round, the Americans had a lackluster tournament, and could only finish sixth. O'Neal averaged 7.3 points and 4.5 rebounds over eight games. The next year, Team USA staged a comeback in the 2003 Tournament of the Americas. Winning all ten of its games and the gold medal, the team qualified for the 2004 Summer Olympics. O'Neal featured in every game in that tournament, averaging 11.2 points and 6.2 rebounds per contest. While he was earmarked as a core member of the team that would compete in the Olympics, a knee injury prevented him from participating in the games.

== NBA career statistics ==
Legend
GP	Games played	GS	Games started	MPG	Minutes per game
FG%	Field goal percentage	3P%	3-point field goal percentage	FT%	Free throw percentage
RPG	Rebounds per game	APG	Assists per game	SPG	Steals per game
BPG	Blocks per game	PPG	Points per game	**Bold**	Career high

=== Regular season ===
Year	Team	GP	GS	MPG	FG%	3P%	FT%	RPG	APG	SPG	BPG	PPG
1996–97	Portland	45	0	10.2	.451	.000	.603	2.8	.2	.0	.6	4.1
1997–98	Portland	60	9	13.5	.485	.000	.506	3.4	.3	.3	1.0	4.5
1998–99	Portland	36	1	8.6	.434	.000	.514	2.7	.4	.1	.4	2.5
1999–00	Portland	70	8	12.3	.486	.000	.582	3.3	.3	.2	.8	3.9
2000–01	Indiana	**81**	**80**	32.6	.465	.000	.601	9.8	1.2	.6	**2.8**	12.9
2001–02	Indiana	72	72	**37.6**	.479	.071	.688	**10.5**	1.6	.6	2.3	19.0
2002–03	Indiana	77	76	37.2	.484	**.333**	.731	10.3	2.0	**.9**	2.3	20.8
2003–04	Indiana	78	78	35.7	.434	.111	.757	10.0	2.1	.8	2.6	20.1
2004–05	Indiana	44	41	34.8	.452	.167	.754	8.8	1.9	.6	2.0	**24.3**
2005–06	Indiana	51	47	35.3	.472	.300	.709	9.3	**2.6**	.5	2.3	20.1
2006–07	Indiana	69	69	35.6	.436	.000	.767	9.6	2.4	.7	2.6	19.4
2007–08	Indiana	42	34	28.7	.439	.000	.742	6.7	2.2	.5	2.1	13.6
2008–09	Toronto	41	34	29.7	.473	.000	.810	7.0	1.6	.4	2.0	13.5
2008–09	Miami	27	27	30.0	.475	.000	.750	5.4	2.0	.4	2.0	13.0
2009–10	Miami	70	70	28.4	**.529**	.000	.720	7.0	1.3	.4	1.4	13.6
2010–11	Boston	24	10	18.0	.459	.000	.674	3.7	.5	.1	1.3	5.4
2011–12	Boston	25	24	22.8	.433	.000	.677	5.4	.4	.3	1.7	5.0
2012–13	Phoenix	55	4	18.7	.482	.000	**.835**	5.3	.8	.3	1.4	8.3
2013–14	Golden State	44	13	20.1	.504	.000	.750	5.5	.6	.3	.9	7.9
Career		1,011	697	27.1	.467	.147	.715	7.2	1.4	.5	1.8	13.2
All-Star		5	2	24.0	.478	.000	.667	7.6	.8	.8	1.4	11.2

=== Playoffs ===
Year	Team	GP	GS	MPG	FG%	3P%	FT%	RPG	APG	SPG	BPG	PPG
1997	Portland	2	0	2.0	.000	.000	.000	.5	.0	.0	.5	.0
1998	Portland	1	0	3.0	.000	.000	.000	1.0	.0	.0	2.0	.0
1999	Portland	9	0	6.1	.400	.000	.500	1.9	.1	.0	.3	1.6
2000	Portland	8	0	4.8	.273	.000	.667	.9	.1	.0	.4	1.5
2001	Indiana	4	4	39.3	.436	.000	.500	12.5	1.8	.0	2.5	9.8
2002	Indiana	5	5	38.4	.447	.000	.750	7.6	1.0	**.8**	1.6	17.2
2003	Indiana	6	6	**45.3**	.467	.000	.785	**17.5**	.7	.5	**3.0**	**22.8**
2004	Indiana	**16**	**16**	37.8	.423	.000	.700	9.1	1.2	.5	2.3	19.2
2005	Indiana	13	13	36.6	.365	.000	.750	8.0	**2.2**	.5	2.6	16.0
2006	Indiana	6	6	36.0	.524	.000	.717	7.5	1.7	.5	2.3	21.0
2009	Miami	6	5	27.0	.549	.000	.750	4.5	1.5	.5	1.5	13.3
2010	Miami	5	5	23.4	.205	.000	.429	5.6	1.0	**.8**	2.0	4.2
2011	Boston	9	9	21.9	.488	.000	**.909**	4.2	.9	.2	1.8	5.8
2014	Golden State	7	3	12.0	**.563**	.000	.750	3.4	.1	.1	.4	6.0
Career		97	72	26.6	.426	.000	.718	6.5	1.0	.4	1.7	11.6

== NBA achievements ==
- NBA All-Star: 2002, 2003, 2004, 2005, 2006, 2007
- All-NBA:
  - Second Team: 2004
  - Third Team: 2002, 2003
- NBA Most Improved Player Award: 2002
- NBA Magic Johnson Award: 2004
- Holds the Pacers franchise records for:
  - Most blocks in a game: 10 (January 22, 2003 vs. the Toronto Raptors)
  - Most blocks in a season: 228 (2000–01)
  - Most rebounds in a playoffs game: 22 (April 29, 2003 vs. Boston Celtics)
  - Highest rebounding average in a playoff series: 17.5 (2003 Eastern Conference First Round vs. Boston Celtics)
  - Most free throws attempted in a game: 25 (January 4, 2005 vs. the Milwaukee Bucks)

== Personal life ==
O'Neal is married to Mesha and has two children: a son, Jermaine Jr., and a daughter, Asjia. Asjia is an AVCA All-American volleyball player and won the 2022 and 2023 NCAA national champion with the University of Texas. He also owned a recording studio named Bogota Entertainment in Atlanta.

O'Neal is a Christian. He also frequently tweets about his faith.

O'Neal was credited as an executive producer on Netflix film Untold: Malice at the Palace in 2021.

He is currently the head basketball coach of Dynamic Prep Academy out of Irving, Texas.

== See also ==
- List of NBA career blocks leaders
- List of NBA single-game blocks leaders
- List of oldest and youngest NBA players
- List of people banned or suspended by the NBA
