= Stan Brown (basketball) =

American basketball player (1929–2009)

Personal information
- Born: June 27, 1929 Philadelphia, Pennsylvania
- Died: August 2, 2009 (aged 80)
- Listed height: 6 ft 3 in (1.91 m)
- Listed weight: 200 lb (91 kg)

Career information
- High school: South Philadelphia (Philadelphia, Pennsylvania)
- Playing career: 1946–1952
- Position: Forward
- Number: 14

Career history
- 1946–1947: Philadelphia Sphas
- 1947–1948: Philadelphia Warriors
- 1948–1949: Philadelphia Sphas
- 1949–1950: Trenton Tigers / Cohoes Marras
- 1951–1952: Philadelphia Warriors
- Stats at NBA.com
- Stats at Basketball Reference

Stanley Brown (June 27, 1929 – August 2, 2009) was an American professional basketball player.

While still a junior at South Philadelphia High School, Brown signed with Philadelphia Sphas in October 1946. He made his professional debut with the Sphas on October 26, 1946.

He played for the Philadelphia Warriors (1947–48, 1951–52) in the BAA and NBA for 34 games. He held the record for the youngest player to play in the NBA/BAA for more than 48 years before the record was broken by Kobe Bryant in 1996. He was 18 years, 139 days at the time of the Warriors' first game of the season.

== BAA/NBA career statistics ==
Legend
| GP | Games played | MPG | Minutes per game |
| FG% | Field-goal percentage | FT% | Free-throw percentage |
| RPG | Rebounds per game | APG | Assists per game |
| PPG | Points per game | **Bold** | Career high |

=== Regular season ===
| Year | Team | GP | MPG | FG% | FT% | RPG | APG | PPG |
|---|---|---|---|---|---|---|---|---|
| 1947–48 | Philadelphia | **19** | – | .268 | **.632** | – | .1 | 2.6 |
| 1951–52 | Philadelphia | 15 | **9.4** | **.349** | .556 | **1.1** | **.6** | **3.6** |
| Career | | 34 | 9.4 | .306 | .595 | 1.1 | .3 | 3.1 |

== See also ==
- List of oldest and youngest NBA players
