= List of men's footballers with 1,000 or more official appearances =

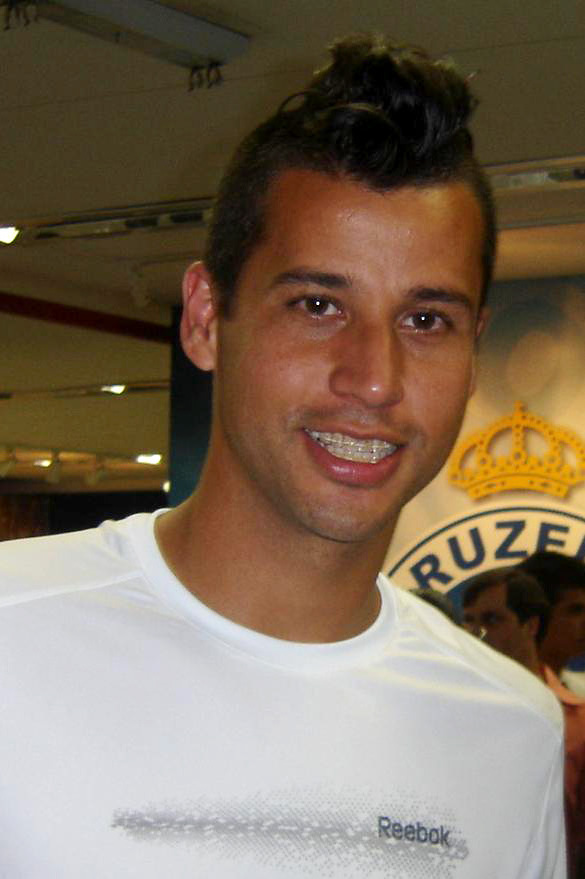
Brazilian goalkeeper Fábio holds the record for the most competitive appearances.

In association football, at least 67 players have played at least 1,000 official matches. Reserve and B team appearances are only included if made in the primary football pyramid and not in reserve divisions. Appearances made in youth football are not deemed to be official. Wartime results are excluded if they were later regarded as unofficial by the relevant football associations; if they were included, Billy Meredith would be the first player to have played in 1,000 official matches, and Stanley Matthews would also make the list. Brazilian goalkeeper Fábio holds the record for the most official appearances, with 1,460 matches. (Note: Fábio's achievement was officially recognized by Guinness World Records on 20 August 2025, with a total of 1,391 at the time, a tally that includes 21 friendly matches for Cruzeiro.) In 1996, English goalkeeper Peter Shilton became the first player to make 1,000 appearances in league matches.

In amateur football, in March 2022, defender/midfielder Robert Carmona from Uruguay was reported as having played around 2,200 official matches. Other amateur players to have made at least 1,000 appearances are defender Fergus Moore from England, who made over 1,200 appearances, and goalkeeper Vincenzo Sabatini from Italy, who has made at least 1,009 appearances.

== Ranking ==
As of 21:35, 22 November 2026 (UTC)

NOTE: Only professional and notable players who had a professional career are included.

Bold indicates the player is currently active.

+ indicates there may be more matches.

Rank	Player	Pos.	Total	Span (Note: "Span" refers to the years of the player's first and last official matches. It is unrelated to the career span mentioned in his bio's infobox or article. For example, if his last match was in 2018, but he officially retired in 2020 after being an unused substitute for 2 years, his "Span" value would end in 2018. Similarly, if a player joined his first team in 1992, but debuted in official matches in 1993, his "Span" value would begin in 1993.)	Teams (Note: The teams in which the player made no official appearance are omitted, e.g. Everton for Pat Jennings or Scarborough for Paul Bastock, while teams in which it is known the player to have made appearances for, but these are unaccounted for, and teams in which it isn't known whether he made any appearance or not are included with a question mark in place of the actual unknown number of appearances.)	Apps	Ref.
1	(Brazil) **Fábio**	GK	1,460	1997–	(Brazil) União Bandeirante	30	
1	(Brazil) **Fábio**	GK	1,460	1997–	(Brazil) Vasco da Gama	150	
1	(Brazil) **Fábio**	GK	1,460	1997–	(Brazil) Cruzeiro (Note: At Cruzeiro, Fábio featured in 976 matches in total including 21 friendlies.)	955	
1	(Brazil) **Fábio**	GK	1,460	1997–	(Brazil) **Fluminense**	**322**	
1	(Brazil) **Fábio**	GK	1,460	1997–	Brazil U23	3	
2	(England) Peter Shilton	GK	1,387	1966–1997	(England) Leicester City	348	(Note: Peter Shilton's 9 matches in regional cups (1965-1990) and 3 abandoned matches in the source from RSSSF are not included in this list, i.e. his total number of matches for Leicester City is 348 instead of 350, his total number of matches for Nottingham Forest is 272 instead of 275, his total number of matches for Southampton is 242 instead of 243, and his total number of matches for Derby County is 211 instead of 217.)
2	(England) Peter Shilton	GK	1,387	1966–1997	(England) Stoke City	121	(Note: Peter Shilton's 9 matches in regional cups (1965-1990) and 3 abandoned matches in the source from RSSSF are not included in this list, i.e. his total number of matches for Leicester City is 348 instead of 350, his total number of matches for Nottingham Forest is 272 instead of 275, his total number of matches for Southampton is 242 instead of 243, and his total number of matches for Derby County is 211 instead of 217.)
2	(England) Peter Shilton	GK	1,387	1966–1997	(England) Nottingham Forest	272	(Note: Peter Shilton's 9 matches in regional cups (1965-1990) and 3 abandoned matches in the source from RSSSF are not included in this list, i.e. his total number of matches for Leicester City is 348 instead of 350, his total number of matches for Nottingham Forest is 272 instead of 275, his total number of matches for Southampton is 242 instead of 243, and his total number of matches for Derby County is 211 instead of 217.)
2	(England) Peter Shilton	GK	1,387	1966–1997	(England) Southampton	242	(Note: Peter Shilton's 9 matches in regional cups (1965-1990) and 3 abandoned matches in the source from RSSSF are not included in this list, i.e. his total number of matches for Leicester City is 348 instead of 350, his total number of matches for Nottingham Forest is 272 instead of 275, his total number of matches for Southampton is 242 instead of 243, and his total number of matches for Derby County is 211 instead of 217.)
2	(England) Peter Shilton	GK	1,387	1966–1997	(England) Derby County	211	(Note: Peter Shilton's 9 matches in regional cups (1965-1990) and 3 abandoned matches in the source from RSSSF are not included in this list, i.e. his total number of matches for Leicester City is 348 instead of 350, his total number of matches for Nottingham Forest is 272 instead of 275, his total number of matches for Southampton is 242 instead of 243, and his total number of matches for Derby County is 211 instead of 217.)
2	(England) Peter Shilton	GK	1,387	1966–1997	(England) Plymouth Argyle	43	(Note: Peter Shilton's 9 matches in regional cups (1965-1990) and 3 abandoned matches in the source from RSSSF are not included in this list, i.e. his total number of matches for Leicester City is 348 instead of 350, his total number of matches for Nottingham Forest is 272 instead of 275, his total number of matches for Southampton is 242 instead of 243, and his total number of matches for Derby County is 211 instead of 217.)
2	(England) Peter Shilton	GK	1,387	1966–1997	(England) Bolton Wanderers	2	(Note: Peter Shilton's 9 matches in regional cups (1965-1990) and 3 abandoned matches in the source from RSSSF are not included in this list, i.e. his total number of matches for Leicester City is 348 instead of 350, his total number of matches for Nottingham Forest is 272 instead of 275, his total number of matches for Southampton is 242 instead of 243, and his total number of matches for Derby County is 211 instead of 217.)
2	(England) Peter Shilton	GK	1,387	1966–1997	(England) Leyton Orient	10	(Note: Peter Shilton's 9 matches in regional cups (1965-1990) and 3 abandoned matches in the source from RSSSF are not included in this list, i.e. his total number of matches for Leicester City is 348 instead of 350, his total number of matches for Nottingham Forest is 272 instead of 275, his total number of matches for Southampton is 242 instead of 243, and his total number of matches for Derby County is 211 instead of 217.)
2	(England) Peter Shilton	GK	1,387	1966–1997	England	125	(Note: Peter Shilton's 9 matches in regional cups (1965-1990) and 3 abandoned matches in the source from RSSSF are not included in this list, i.e. his total number of matches for Leicester City is 348 instead of 350, his total number of matches for Nottingham Forest is 272 instead of 275, his total number of matches for Southampton is 242 instead of 243, and his total number of matches for Derby County is 211 instead of 217.)
2	(England) Peter Shilton	GK	1,387	1966–1997	England U23	13	(Note: Peter Shilton's 9 matches in regional cups (1965-1990) and 3 abandoned matches in the source from RSSSF are not included in this list, i.e. his total number of matches for Leicester City is 348 instead of 350, his total number of matches for Nottingham Forest is 272 instead of 275, his total number of matches for Southampton is 242 instead of 243, and his total number of matches for Derby County is 211 instead of 217.)
3	(Portugal) **Cristiano Ronaldo**	MF/FW	1,349	2002–	(Portugal) Sporting CP B	2	
3	(Portugal) **Cristiano Ronaldo**	MF/FW	1,349	2002–	(Portugal) Sporting CP	31	
3	(Portugal) **Cristiano Ronaldo**	MF/FW	1,349	2002–	(England) Manchester United	346	
3	(Portugal) **Cristiano Ronaldo**	MF/FW	1,349	2002–	(Spain) Real Madrid	438	
3	(Portugal) **Cristiano Ronaldo**	MF/FW	1,349	2002–	(Italy) Juventus	134	
3	(Portugal) **Cristiano Ronaldo**	MF/FW	1,349	2002–	(Saudi Arabia) **Al-Nassr**	**161**	
3	(Portugal) **Cristiano Ronaldo**	MF/FW	1,349	2002–	Portugal	234	
3	(Portugal) **Cristiano Ronaldo**	MF/FW	1,349	2002–	Portugal U23	3	
4	(England) Paul Bastock	GK	1,297+	1986–2022	(England) Coventry City	?	(Note: Paul Bastock is often credited with 1,280 club appearances in the news instead of 1,297 because he is credited with 677 appearances for Boston United instead of 679, most likely the total count is missing his match for Pinchbeck United, his match for Deeping Rangers in 2022, and there are some other miscalculations that can't be traced since all sources listing him with a total of 1,280 matches lack the detailed stats per club.) (Note: Paul Bastock additionally played once for England C, though this match is against a League selection, and such matches are also often seen as unofficial friendlies, even if they are played on slots during the FIFA calendar.)
4	(England) Paul Bastock	GK	1,297+	1986–2022	(England) Cambridge United	14	
4	(England) Paul Bastock	GK	1,297+	1986–2022	(England) Bath City	1	
4	(England) Paul Bastock	GK	1,297+	1986–2022	(Malaysia) Sabah FA	?	
4	(England) Paul Bastock	GK	1,297+	1986–2022	(England) Kettering Town (Note: Paul Bastock played in at least 38 matches for Kettering Town.)	38+	
4	(England) Paul Bastock	GK	1,297+	1986–2022	(England) Fisher Athletic	29	
4	(England) Paul Bastock	GK	1,297+	1986–2022	(England) Aylesbury United	5	
4	(England) Paul Bastock	GK	1,297+	1986–2022	(England) Boston United	679	
4	(England) Paul Bastock	GK	1,297+	1986–2022	(England) Dagenham & Redbridge	1	
4	(England) Paul Bastock	GK	1,297+	1986–2022	(England) St Albans City	315	
4	(England) Paul Bastock	GK	1,297+	1986–2022	(England) Rushden & Diamonds	25	
4	(England) Paul Bastock	GK	1,297+	1986–2022	(England) Worksop Town	42	
4	(England) Paul Bastock	GK	1,297+	1986–2022	(England) Royston Town	13	
4	(England) Paul Bastock	GK	1,297+	1986–2022	(England) St Neots Town	39	
4	(England) Paul Bastock	GK	1,297+	1986–2022	(England) Dunstable Town	30	
4	(England) Paul Bastock	GK	1,297+	1986–2022	(England) Stamford	25	
4	(England) Paul Bastock	GK	1,297+	1986–2022	(England) Corby Town	5	
4	(England) Paul Bastock	GK	1,297+	1986–2022	(England) Wisbech Town	33	
4	(England) Paul Bastock	GK	1,297+	1986–2022	(England) Grantham Town	1	
4	(England) Paul Bastock	GK	1,297+	1986–2022	(England) Pinchbeck United	1	
4	(England) Paul Bastock	GK	1,297+	1986–2022	(England) Deeping Rangers	1	
5	(Brazil) Rogério Ceni	GK	1,226	1990–2015	(Brazil) Sinop	12	
5	(Brazil) Rogério Ceni	GK	1,226	1990–2015	(Brazil) São Paulo	1,197	
5	(Brazil) Rogério Ceni	GK	1,226	1990–2015	Brazil	17	
6	(Argentina) **Lionel Messi**	MF/FW	1,223	2003–	(Spain) Barcelona C	10	
6	(Argentina) **Lionel Messi**	MF/FW	1,223	2003–	(Spain) Barcelona B	22	
6	(Argentina) **Lionel Messi**	MF/FW	1,223	2003–	(Spain) Barcelona	778	
6	(Argentina) **Lionel Messi**	MF/FW	1,223	2003–	(France) Paris Saint-Germain	75	
6	(Argentina) **Lionel Messi**	MF/FW	1,223	2003–	(United States) **Inter Miami**	**125**	
6	(Argentina) **Lionel Messi**	MF/FW	1,223	2003–	Argentina	208	
6	(Argentina) **Lionel Messi**	MF/FW	1,223	2003–	Argentina U23	5	
7	(Croatia) **Luka Modrić**	MF	1,189	2004–	(Croatia) Dinamo Zagreb	130	
7	(Croatia) **Luka Modrić**	MF	1,189	2004–	(Bosnia and Herzegovina) Zrinjski Mostar	25	
7	(Croatia) **Luka Modrić**	MF	1,189	2004–	(Croatia) Inter Zaprešić	18	
7	(Croatia) **Luka Modrić**	MF	1,189	2004–	(England) Tottenham Hotspur	160	
7	(Croatia) **Luka Modrić**	MF	1,189	2004–	(Spain) Real Madrid	597	
7	(Croatia) **Luka Modrić**	MF	1,189	2004–	(Italy) **Milan**	**51**	
7	(Croatia) **Luka Modrić**	MF	1,189	2004–	**Croatia**	**208**	
8	(Czechoslovakia) František Plánička	GK	1,187+	1918–1957	(Czechoslovakia) Slovan Praha VII	22	(Note: František Plánička additionally played in at least 66 matches for selects (Prague, international veterans and other selects), which could raise the total to 1,253+ matches, but such matches are also often seen as unofficial ones, therefore they are not included in the list.) (Note: František Plánička is credited with 1442 matches by Slavia Praha's official website, but this claim isn't in agreement with the majority of the other sources, which give a total of 1,235 matches, or 1,253 matches, which could well be a typo, but in details the total appears to be 1,253, of which 1,253 matches only 1,187 are listed here, as the other are matches for veterans and selects, which are also often seen as unofficial ones.)
8	(Czechoslovakia) František Plánička	GK	1,187+	1918–1957	(Czechoslovakia) Union VII	?	
8	(Czechoslovakia) František Plánička	GK	1,187+	1918–1957	(Czechoslovakia) Staroměstský SK Olympia	?	
8	(Czechoslovakia) František Plánička	GK	1,187+	1918–1957	(Czechoslovakia) SK Bubeneč	108	
8	(Czechoslovakia) František Plánička	GK	1,187+	1918–1957	(Czechoslovakia) Slavia Praha (Note: František Plánička appeared overall (including friendlies) in more than 1,100 matches for Slavia Praha.)	969	
8	(Czechoslovakia) František Plánička	GK	1,187+	1918–1957	(Czechoslovakia) Rudá Hvězda VII	14	
8	(Czechoslovakia) František Plánička	GK	1,187+	1918–1957	Czechoslovakia (Note: František Plánička's tally with the national team is unclear, and it could well have been even 74 or 76, based on many other sources.)	73+	
8	(Czechoslovakia) František Plánička	GK	1,187+	1918–1957	Czechoslovakia amateur team	1	
9	(Jamaica) Barry Hayles	FW	1,180	1989–2023	(England) Willesden Hawkeye	141	(Note: Barry Hayles played in 74 official matches for Windsor; 60 matches at his first stint, with the totals having a mistake, as he played in 3 cup matches instead of 2 matches in the 2018–19 season, and 14 matches (1 goal) at his second stint.) (Note: Barry Hayles played in 20 official matches for Merstham.) (Note: Barry Hayles additionally played two more times for England C against Highland League selections, also scoring on both occasions, hence playing four times overall and scoring once in every match he played.)
9	(Jamaica) Barry Hayles	FW	1,180	1989–2023	(England) Stevenage Borough	154	
9	(Jamaica) Barry Hayles	FW	1,180	1989–2023	(England) Bristol Rovers	76	
9	(Jamaica) Barry Hayles	FW	1,180	1989–2023	(England) Fulham	215	
9	(Jamaica) Barry Hayles	FW	1,180	1989–2023	(England) Sheffield United	5	
9	(Jamaica) Barry Hayles	FW	1,180	1989–2023	(England) Rotherham United	?	
9	(Jamaica) Barry Hayles	FW	1,180	1989–2023	(England) Millwall	60	
9	(Jamaica) Barry Hayles	FW	1,180	1989–2023	(England) Plymouth Argyle	66	
9	(Jamaica) Barry Hayles	FW	1,180	1989–2023	(England) Leicester City	30	
9	(Jamaica) Barry Hayles	FW	1,180	1989–2023	(England) Cheltenham Town	55	
9	(Jamaica) Barry Hayles	FW	1,180	1989–2023	(England) Truro City	140	
9	(Jamaica) Barry Hayles	FW	1,180	1989–2023	(England) St Albans City	21	
9	(Jamaica) Barry Hayles	FW	1,180	1989–2023	(England) Arlesey Town	38	
9	(Jamaica) Barry Hayles	FW	1,180	1989–2023	(England) Chesham United	73	
9	(Jamaica) Barry Hayles	FW	1,180	1989–2023	(England) Windsor	74	
9	(Jamaica) Barry Hayles	FW	1,180	1989–2023	(England) Merstham	20	
9	(Jamaica) Barry Hayles	FW	1,180	1989–2023	Jamaica	10	
9	(Jamaica) Barry Hayles	FW	1,180	1989–2023	England C	2	
10	(Scotland) Tommy Hutchison	DF/MF/FW	1,178+	1964–1994	(Scotland) Dundonald Bluebell	?	(Note: Tommy Hutchison played for Bulova 22 times in league matches, and in at least four matches in cups, as he may have other matches unaccounted for in the Hong Kong FA Cup, in the Viceroy Cup or in the Hong Kong Senior Challenge Shield.) (Note: Tommy Hutchinson played in at least eight matches for Swansea City in the Welsh Cup, as he may have other matches unaccounted for in the Welsh Cup) (Note: Tommy Hutchison made 76 appearances for Merthyr Tydfil scoring on two occasions, with the source from Merthyr Tydfil's site (with the club now – 23 November 2021 – called Merthyr Town) having his last name misspelled, but it's crystal clear this is about him for three reasons: i) from their description of the player, ii) there is a long history of his surname being misspelled on many occasions in the past, and iii) it can be verified from other matches where he is credited as "Hutchinson", if the lineups of these matches (which were for Swansea City in the FA Challenge Cup) are aligned with the lineups of them in his profile in ENFA (English National Football Association), with 73 of these 76 matches being in the league and so 3 in cups, with the two of these three being able to be traced with the misspelled surname from the same site that had these two matches of Tommy Hutchison for Swansea City, where he is listed as "Tommy Hutchinson", and are 2 matches against Colchester United for the FA Trophy in 1992, and the one left was a match in South Wales Senior Cup on 8 February 1994 against Taffs Well.)
10	(Scotland) Tommy Hutchison	DF/MF/FW	1,178+	1964–1994	(Scotland) Alloa Athletic	84	
10	(Scotland) Tommy Hutchison	DF/MF/FW	1,178+	1964–1994	(England) Blackpool	198	
10	(Scotland) Tommy Hutchison	DF/MF/FW	1,178+	1964–1994	(England) Coventry City	355	
10	(Scotland) Tommy Hutchison	DF/MF/FW	1,178+	1964–1994	(United States) Seattle Sounders	25	
10	(Scotland) Tommy Hutchison	DF/MF/FW	1,178+	1964–1994	(England) Manchester City	60	
10	(Scotland) Tommy Hutchison	DF/MF/FW	1,178+	1964–1994	(Hong Kong) Bulova	26+	
10	(Scotland) Tommy Hutchison	DF/MF/FW	1,178+	1964–1994	(England) Burnley	114	
10	(Scotland) Tommy Hutchison	DF/MF/FW	1,178+	1964–1994	(Wales) Swansea City	222+	
10	(Scotland) Tommy Hutchison	DF/MF/FW	1,178+	1964–1994	(Wales) Merthyr Tydfil	76	
10	(Scotland) Tommy Hutchison	DF/MF/FW	1,178+	1964–1994	Scotland	17	
10	(Scotland) Tommy Hutchison	DF/MF/FW	1,178+	1964–1994	Scotland U23	1	
11	(Portugal) **João Moutinho**	MF	1,165	2003–	(Portugal) Sporting CP B	30	
11	(Portugal) **João Moutinho**	MF	1,165	2003–	(Portugal) Sporting CP	259	
11	(Portugal) **João Moutinho**	MF	1,165	2003–	(Portugal) Porto	140	
11	(Portugal) **João Moutinho**	MF	1,165	2003–	(France) Monaco (Note: Though based in Monaco, AS Monaco FC plays in the French football league system and in European, intercontinental and world tournaments appears with the flag of France.) (Note: João Moutinho has been also credited with 221 matches for Monaco, but this is a mistake as SoccerWay also includes two matches he played in the 2014 Emirates Cup, which was a friendly tournament.)	219	
11	(Portugal) **João Moutinho**	MF	1,165	2003–	(England) Wolverhampton Wanderers	212	
11	(Portugal) **João Moutinho**	MF	1,165	2003–	(Portugal) **Braga**	**158**	
11	(Portugal) **João Moutinho**	MF	1,165	2003–	Portugal	146	
11	(Portugal) **João Moutinho**	MF	1,165	2003–	Portugal B	1	
12	(Northern Ireland) Pat Jennings	GK	1,161	1961–1986	(Northern Ireland) Newry Shamrock Rovers (Note: Pat Jennings played in 11 matches for Newry Shamrock Rovers.)	11	(Note: Pat Jennings was the first man in English football to make 1,000 first team appearances, with his 1,000th appearance being on 26 February 1983.)
12	(Northern Ireland) Pat Jennings	GK	1,161	1961–1986	(Northern Ireland) Bessbrook Products	7	(Note: Pat Jennings was the first man in English football to make 1,000 first team appearances, with his 1,000th appearance being on 26 February 1983.)
12	(Northern Ireland) Pat Jennings	GK	1,161	1961–1986	(Northern Ireland) Newry United (Note: Pat Jennings played in 10 matches for Newry United.)	10	(Note: Pat Jennings was the first man in English football to make 1,000 first team appearances, with his 1,000th appearance being on 26 February 1983.)
12	(Northern Ireland) Pat Jennings	GK	1,161	1961–1986	(Northern Ireland) Newry Celtic (Note: Pat Jennings played in 9 matches for Newry Celtic.)	9	(Note: Pat Jennings was the first man in English football to make 1,000 first team appearances, with his 1,000th appearance being on 26 February 1983.)
12	(Northern Ireland) Pat Jennings	GK	1,161	1961–1986	(Northern Ireland) Newry Town (Note: Pat Jennings played in 28 matches for Newry Town. (1961–62 Irish League B division) in Northern Ireland before Watford.)	28	(Note: Pat Jennings was the first man in English football to make 1,000 first team appearances, with his 1,000th appearance being on 26 February 1983.)
12	(Northern Ireland) Pat Jennings	GK	1,161	1961–1986	(England) Watford	52	(Note: Pat Jennings was the first man in English football to make 1,000 first team appearances, with his 1,000th appearance being on 26 February 1983.)
12	(Northern Ireland) Pat Jennings	GK	1,161	1961–1986	(England) Tottenham Hotspur	597	(Note: Pat Jennings was the first man in English football to make 1,000 first team appearances, with his 1,000th appearance being on 26 February 1983.)
12	(Northern Ireland) Pat Jennings	GK	1,161	1961–1986	(England) Arsenal	327	(Note: Pat Jennings was the first man in English football to make 1,000 first team appearances, with his 1,000th appearance being on 26 February 1983.)
12	(Northern Ireland) Pat Jennings	GK	1,161	1961–1986	Northern Ireland	119	(Note: Pat Jennings was the first man in English football to make 1,000 first team appearances, with his 1,000th appearance being on 26 February 1983.)
12	(Northern Ireland) Pat Jennings	GK	1,161	1961–1986	Northern Ireland U23	1	(Note: Pat Jennings was the first man in English football to make 1,000 first team appearances, with his 1,000th appearance being on 26 February 1983.)
13	(Italy) Gianluigi Buffon	GK	1,155	1995–2023	(Italy) Parma	265	
13	(Italy) Gianluigi Buffon	GK	1,155	1995–2023	(Italy) Juventus	685	
13	(Italy) Gianluigi Buffon	GK	1,155	1995–2023	(France) Paris Saint-Germain	25	
13	(Italy) Gianluigi Buffon	GK	1,155	1995–2023	Italy	176	
13	(Italy) Gianluigi Buffon	GK	1,155	1995–2023	Italy U23	4	
14	(Japan) Yasuhito Endō	MF	1,141	1997–2023	(Japan) Kagoshima Mitsutaka	1	(Note: Yasuhito Endō's previous references from official websites of some of the clubs he played and from football statistics databases are missing 3 official matches he played in the 2006 A3 Champions Cup for Gamba Osaka..)
14	(Japan) Yasuhito Endō	MF	1,141	1997–2023	(Japan) Yokohama Flügels	20	(Note: Yasuhito Endō's previous references from official websites of some of the clubs he played and from football statistics databases are missing 3 official matches he played in the 2006 A3 Champions Cup for Gamba Osaka..)
14	(Japan) Yasuhito Endō	MF	1,141	1997–2023	(Japan) Kyoto Purple Sanga	64	(Note: Yasuhito Endō's previous references from official websites of some of the clubs he played and from football statistics databases are missing 3 official matches he played in the 2006 A3 Champions Cup for Gamba Osaka..)
14	(Japan) Yasuhito Endō	MF	1,141	1997–2023	(Japan) Gamba Osaka	790	(Note: Yasuhito Endō's previous references from official websites of some of the clubs he played and from football statistics databases are missing 3 official matches he played in the 2006 A3 Champions Cup for Gamba Osaka..)
14	(Japan) Yasuhito Endō	MF	1,141	1997–2023	(Japan) Jubilo Iwata	107	(Note: Yasuhito Endō's previous references from official websites of some of the clubs he played and from football statistics databases are missing 3 official matches he played in the 2006 A3 Champions Cup for Gamba Osaka..)
14	(Japan) Yasuhito Endō	MF	1,141	1997–2023	Japan	152	(Note: Yasuhito Endō's previous references from official websites of some of the clubs he played and from football statistics databases are missing 3 official matches he played in the 2006 A3 Champions Cup for Gamba Osaka..)
14	(Japan) Yasuhito Endō	MF	1,141	1997–2023	Japan U23	7	(Note: Yasuhito Endō's previous references from official websites of some of the clubs he played and from football statistics databases are missing 3 official matches he played in the 2006 A3 Champions Cup for Gamba Osaka..)
15	(Brazil) Roberto Carlos	DF	1,140+	1991–2011; 2015	(Brazil) União São João	67	
15	(Brazil) Roberto Carlos	DF	1,140+	1991–2011; 2015	(Brazil) Palmeiras (Note: Roberto Carlos played in 162 official matches for Palmeiras)	162	
15	(Brazil) Roberto Carlos	DF	1,140+	1991–2011; 2015	(Italy) Inter Milan	34	
15	(Brazil) Roberto Carlos	DF	1,140+	1991–2011; 2015	(Spain) Real Madrid	527	
15	(Brazil) Roberto Carlos	DF	1,140+	1991–2011; 2015	(Turkey) Fenerbahçe	104	
15	(Brazil) Roberto Carlos	DF	1,140+	1991–2011; 2015	(Brazil) Corinthians	61	
15	(Brazil) Roberto Carlos	DF	1,140+	1991–2011; 2015	(Russia) Anzhi Makhachkala (Note: Roberto Carlos played in 32 official matches for Anzhi Makhachkala; 29 in the league, including the championship play-offs and 3 in the cup.)	32	
15	(Brazil) Roberto Carlos	DF	1,140+	1991–2011; 2015	(India) Delhi Dynamos	3	
15	(Brazil) Roberto Carlos	DF	1,140+	1991–2011; 2015	Brazil	127+	
15	(Brazil) Roberto Carlos	DF	1,140+	1991–2011; 2015	Brazil Olympic team	23	
16	(Poland) **Robert Lewandowski**	FW	1,136	2005–	(Poland) Delta Warsaw	19	
16	(Poland) **Robert Lewandowski**	FW	1,136	2005–	(Poland) Legia Warsaw II	14	
16	(Poland) **Robert Lewandowski**	FW	1,136	2005–	(Poland) Znicz II Pruszków	4	
16	(Poland) **Robert Lewandowski**	FW	1,136	2005–	(Poland) Znicz Pruszków	66	
16	(Poland) **Robert Lewandowski**	FW	1,136	2005–	(Poland) Lech Poznań	82	
16	(Poland) **Robert Lewandowski**	FW	1,136	2005–	(Germany) Borussia Dortmund	187	
16	(Poland) **Robert Lewandowski**	FW	1,136	2005–	(Germany) Bayern Munich	375	
16	(Poland) **Robert Lewandowski**	FW	1,136	2005–	(Spain) Barcelona	193	
16	(Poland) **Robert Lewandowski**	FW	1,136	2005–	(United States) **Chicago Fire**	**23**	
16	(Poland) **Robert Lewandowski**	FW	1,136	2005–	**Poland**	**173**	
17	(England) Ray Clemence	GK	1,134+	1963–1988	(England) Skegness Spartans	1	
17	(England) Ray Clemence	GK	1,134+	1963–1988	(England) Skegness Cosmos	13+	
17	(England) Ray Clemence	GK	1,134+	1963–1988	(England) Scunthorpe United	51	
17	(England) Ray Clemence	GK	1,134+	1963–1988	(England) Liverpool	665	
17	(England) Ray Clemence	GK	1,134+	1963–1988	(Australia) St. George-Budapest	2	
17	(England) Ray Clemence	GK	1,134+	1963–1988	(England) Tottenham Hotspur	337	
17	(England) Ray Clemence	GK	1,134+	1963–1988	England	61	
17	(England) Ray Clemence	GK	1,134+	1963–1988	England U23	4	
18	(Brazil) **Nenê**	MF/FW	1,121	2000–	(Brazil) Paulista	72	
18	(Brazil) **Nenê**	MF/FW	1,121	2000–	(Brazil) Palmeiras	30	
18	(Brazil) **Nenê**	MF/FW	1,121	2000–	(Brazil) Santos	41	
18	(Brazil) **Nenê**	MF/FW	1,121	2000–	(Spain) Mallorca	37	
18	(Brazil) **Nenê**	MF/FW	1,121	2000–	(Spain) Alavés	78	
18	(Brazil) **Nenê**	MF/FW	1,121	2000–	(Spain) Celta Vigo	48	
18	(Brazil) **Nenê**	MF/FW	1,121	2000–	(France) Monaco	73	
18	(Brazil) **Nenê**	MF/FW	1,121	2000–	(Spain) Espanyol	39	
18	(Brazil) **Nenê**	MF/FW	1,121	2000–	(France) Paris Saint-Germain	112	
18	(Brazil) **Nenê**	MF/FW	1,121	2000–	(Qatar) Al-Gharafa (Note: All 59 matches for Al-Gharafa; 43 participations in the league, 8 in AFC Champions League and 8 in local cups such as Qatar Stars Cup and Emir Cup are covered by Doha News (site: https://dohanews.co/), The Peninsula (newspaper) (site: https://thepeninsulaqatar.com/), Qatar Football Association (site: https://www.qfa.qa/en) and Gulf Times (site: https://www.gulf-times.com/), which can be also easily verified if asking the AI of Google Search a relevant question.)	59	
18	(Brazil) **Nenê**	MF/FW	1,121	2000–	(England) West Ham United	8	
18	(Brazil) **Nenê**	MF/FW	1,121	2000–	(Brazil) Vasco da Gama	199	
18	(Brazil) **Nenê**	MF/FW	1,121	2000–	(Brazil) São Paulo	72	
18	(Brazil) **Nenê**	MF/FW	1,121	2000–	(Brazil) Fluminense	118	
18	(Brazil) **Nenê**	MF/FW	1,121	2000–	(Brazil) Juventude	96	
18	(Brazil) **Nenê**	MF/FW	1,121	2000–	(Brazil) **Botafogo-PB**	**33**	
18	(Brazil) **Nenê**	MF/FW	1,121	2000–	Brazil Olympic team	6	
19	(England) Tony Ford	DF/MF/FW	1,119	1975–2001	(England) Grimsby Town	513	(Note: Tony Ford was the first outfield player to appear in 1,000 matches as a professional throughout the history of the English and Scottish leagues.)
19	(England) Tony Ford	DF/MF/FW	1,119	1975–2001	(England) Sunderland	9	(Note: Tony Ford was the first outfield player to appear in 1,000 matches as a professional throughout the history of the English and Scottish leagues.)
19	(England) Tony Ford	DF/MF/FW	1,119	1975–2001	(England) Stoke City	135	(Note: Tony Ford was the first outfield player to appear in 1,000 matches as a professional throughout the history of the English and Scottish leagues.)
19	(England) Tony Ford	DF/MF/FW	1,119	1975–2001	(England) West Bromwich Albion	128	(Note: Tony Ford was the first outfield player to appear in 1,000 matches as a professional throughout the history of the English and Scottish leagues.)
19	(England) Tony Ford	DF/MF/FW	1,119	1975–2001	(England) Bradford City	7	(Note: Tony Ford was the first outfield player to appear in 1,000 matches as a professional throughout the history of the English and Scottish leagues.)
19	(England) Tony Ford	DF/MF/FW	1,119	1975–2001	(England) Scunthorpe United	91	(Note: Tony Ford was the first outfield player to appear in 1,000 matches as a professional throughout the history of the English and Scottish leagues.)
19	(England) Tony Ford	DF/MF/FW	1,119	1975–2001	(England) Barrow	14	(Note: Tony Ford was the first outfield player to appear in 1,000 matches as a professional throughout the history of the English and Scottish leagues.)
19	(England) Tony Ford	DF/MF/FW	1,119	1975–2001	(England) Mansfield Town	116	(Note: Tony Ford was the first outfield player to appear in 1,000 matches as a professional throughout the history of the English and Scottish leagues.)
19	(England) Tony Ford	DF/MF/FW	1,119	1975–2001	(England) Rochdale	104	(Note: Tony Ford was the first outfield player to appear in 1,000 matches as a professional throughout the history of the English and Scottish leagues.)
19	(England) Tony Ford	DF/MF/FW	1,119	1975–2001	England B	2	(Note: Tony Ford was the first outfield player to appear in 1,000 matches as a professional throughout the history of the English and Scottish leagues.)
20	(Argentina) Javier Zanetti	DF/MF	1,115	1992–2014	(Argentina) Talleres RE	33	(Note: Javier Zanetti played 13 times for Argentina U23; 1 match at the 1995 Copa Mercosur, 6 matches at the 1995 Panamerican Games, and 6 matches at the 1996 Summer Olympics.)
20	(Argentina) Javier Zanetti	DF/MF	1,115	1992–2014	(Argentina) Banfield	66	(Note: Javier Zanetti played 13 times for Argentina U23; 1 match at the 1995 Copa Mercosur, 6 matches at the 1995 Panamerican Games, and 6 matches at the 1996 Summer Olympics.)
20	(Argentina) Javier Zanetti	DF/MF	1,115	1992–2014	(Italy) Inter Milan	858	(Note: Javier Zanetti played 13 times for Argentina U23; 1 match at the 1995 Copa Mercosur, 6 matches at the 1995 Panamerican Games, and 6 matches at the 1996 Summer Olympics.)
20	(Argentina) Javier Zanetti	DF/MF	1,115	1992–2014	Argentina	145	(Note: Javier Zanetti played 13 times for Argentina U23; 1 match at the 1995 Copa Mercosur, 6 matches at the 1995 Panamerican Games, and 6 matches at the 1996 Summer Olympics.)
20	(Argentina) Javier Zanetti	DF/MF	1,115	1992–2014	Argentina U23	13	(Note: Javier Zanetti played 13 times for Argentina U23; 1 match at the 1995 Copa Mercosur, 6 matches at the 1995 Panamerican Games, and 6 matches at the 1996 Summer Olympics.)
21	(England) **Scott McGleish**	FW	1,113	1993–	(England) Edgware Town	64	
21	(England) **Scott McGleish**	FW	1,113	1993–	(England) Charlton Athletic	6	
21	(England) **Scott McGleish**	FW	1,113	1993–	(England) Leyton Orient	161	
21	(England) **Scott McGleish**	FW	1,113	1993–	(England) Peterborough United	19	
21	(England) **Scott McGleish**	FW	1,113	1993–	(England) Colchester United	184	
21	(England) **Scott McGleish**	FW	1,113	1993–	(England) Cambridge United	11	
21	(England) **Scott McGleish**	FW	1,113	1993–	(England) Barnet	164	
21	(England) **Scott McGleish**	FW	1,113	1993–	(England) Northampton Town	143	
21	(England) **Scott McGleish**	FW	1,113	1993–	(England) Wycombe Wanderers	81	
21	(England) **Scott McGleish**	FW	1,113	1993–	(England) Bristol Rovers	32	
21	(England) **Scott McGleish**	FW	1,113	1993–	(England) Whitehawk	8	
21	(England) **Scott McGleish**	FW	1,113	1993–	(England) Chesham United	30	
21	(England) **Scott McGleish**	FW	1,113	1993–	(England) Enfield Town	13	
21	(England) **Scott McGleish**	FW	1,113	1993–	(England) Wealdstone	133	
21	(England) **Scott McGleish**	FW	1,113	1993–	(England) Cheshunt	1	
21	(England) **Scott McGleish**	FW	1,113	1993–	(England) Hendon	4	
21	(England) **Scott McGleish**	FW	1,113	1993–	(England) **Leverstock Green**	**59**	
22	(Brazil) Marcelinho Paraíba	MF/FW	1,112	1991–2020	(Brazil) Campinense	16	
22	(Brazil) Marcelinho Paraíba	MF/FW	1,112	1991–2020	(Brazil) Paraguaçuense	28	
22	(Brazil) Marcelinho Paraíba	MF/FW	1,112	1991–2020	(Brazil) Santos	14	
22	(Brazil) Marcelinho Paraíba	MF/FW	1,112	1991–2020	(Brazil) Rio Branco	79	
22	(Brazil) Marcelinho Paraíba	MF/FW	1,112	1991–2020	(Brazil) São Paulo	202	
22	(Brazil) Marcelinho Paraíba	MF/FW	1,112	1991–2020	(France) Marseille	21	
22	(Brazil) Marcelinho Paraíba	MF/FW	1,112	1991–2020	(Brazil) Grêmio	23	
22	(Brazil) Marcelinho Paraíba	MF/FW	1,112	1991–2020	(Germany) Hertha BSC	193	
22	(Brazil) Marcelinho Paraíba	MF/FW	1,112	1991–2020	(Turkey) Trabzonspor	22	
22	(Brazil) Marcelinho Paraíba	MF/FW	1,112	1991–2020	(Germany) VfL Wolfsburg	57	
22	(Brazil) Marcelinho Paraíba	MF/FW	1,112	1991–2020	(Brazil) Flamengo	25	
22	(Brazil) Marcelinho Paraíba	MF/FW	1,112	1991–2020	(Brazil) Coritiba	50	
22	(Brazil) Marcelinho Paraíba	MF/FW	1,112	1991–2020	(Brazil) Sport Recife	92	
22	(Brazil) Marcelinho Paraíba	MF/FW	1,112	1991–2020	(Brazil) Grêmio Barueri	19	
22	(Brazil) Marcelinho Paraíba	MF/FW	1,112	1991–2020	(Brazil) Boa	45	
22	(Brazil) Marcelinho Paraíba	MF/FW	1,112	1991–2020	(Brazil) Fortaleza	44	
22	(Brazil) Marcelinho Paraíba	MF/FW	1,112	1991–2020	(Brazil) Internacional de Lages	26	
22	(Brazil) Marcelinho Paraíba	MF/FW	1,112	1991–2020	(Brazil) Joinville	30	
22	(Brazil) Marcelinho Paraíba	MF/FW	1,112	1991–2020	(Brazil) Oeste	13	
22	(Brazil) Marcelinho Paraíba	MF/FW	1,112	1991–2020	(Brazil) Ypiranga	4	
22	(Brazil) Marcelinho Paraíba	MF/FW	1,112	1991–2020	(Brazil) Portuguesa	26	
22	(Brazil) Marcelinho Paraíba	MF/FW	1,112	1991–2020	(Brazil) Treze	54	
22	(Brazil) Marcelinho Paraíba	MF/FW	1,112	1991–2020	(Brazil) Perilima	24	
22	(Brazil) Marcelinho Paraíba	MF/FW	1,112	1991–2020	Brazil	5	
23	(England) **Jamie Cureton**	FW	1,098	1994–	(England) Norwich City	108	
23	(England) **Jamie Cureton**	FW	1,098	1994–	(England) Bournemouth	6	
23	(England) **Jamie Cureton**	FW	1,098	1994–	(England) Bristol Rovers	200	
23	(England) **Jamie Cureton**	FW	1,098	1994–	(England) Reading	127	
23	(England) **Jamie Cureton**	FW	1,098	1994–	(South Korea) Busan I'Cons	21	
23	(England) **Jamie Cureton**	FW	1,098	1994–	(England) Queens Park Rangers	46	
23	(England) **Jamie Cureton**	FW	1,098	1994–	(England) Swindon Town	32	
23	(England) **Jamie Cureton**	FW	1,098	1994–	(England) Colchester United	56	
23	(England) **Jamie Cureton**	FW	1,098	1994–	(England) Barnsley	8	
23	(England) **Jamie Cureton**	FW	1,098	1994–	(England) Shrewsbury Town	12	
23	(England) **Jamie Cureton**	FW	1,098	1994–	(England) Exeter City	97	
23	(England) **Jamie Cureton**	FW	1,098	1994–	(England) Leyton Orient	23	
23	(England) **Jamie Cureton**	FW	1,098	1994–	(England) Cheltenham Town	36	
23	(England) **Jamie Cureton**	FW	1,098	1994–	(England) Dagenham & Redbridge	93	
23	(England) **Jamie Cureton**	FW	1,098	1994–	(England) Farnborough	50	
23	(England) **Jamie Cureton**	FW	1,098	1994–	(England) Eastleigh	7	
23	(England) **Jamie Cureton**	FW	1,098	1994–	(England) St Albans City	17	
23	(England) **Jamie Cureton**	FW	1,098	1994–	(England) Bishop's Stortford	94	
23	(England) **Jamie Cureton**	FW	1,098	1994–	(England) Enfield	29	
23	(England) **Jamie Cureton**	FW	1,098	1994–	(England) Hornchurch	8	
23	(England) **Jamie Cureton**	FW	1,098	1994–	(England) Maldon & Tiptree	3	
23	(England) **Jamie Cureton**	FW	1,098	1994–	(England) Cambridge City	3	
23	(England) **Jamie Cureton**	FW	1,098	1994–	(England) Kings Park Rangers	21	
23	(England) **Jamie Cureton**	FW	1,098	1994–	(England) Holland	1	
24	(Spain) Xavi	MF	1,096	1997–2019	(Spain) Barcelona B	61	(Note: Xavi's previous references from official websites of some of the clubs he played and from football statistics databases are missing 2 official matches he played for Al Sadd in cups in Qatar, one in 2016 for the Emir Cup and one for the Qatar Cup in 2018.) (Note: Xavi additionally played 12 matches for the unofficial "national" team of Catalonia,)
24	(Spain) Xavi	MF	1,096	1997–2019	(Spain) Barcelona	779	(Note: Xavi's previous references from official websites of some of the clubs he played and from football statistics databases are missing 2 official matches he played for Al Sadd in cups in Qatar, one in 2016 for the Emir Cup and one for the Qatar Cup in 2018.) (Note: Xavi additionally played 12 matches for the unofficial "national" team of Catalonia,)
24	(Spain) Xavi	MF	1,096	1997–2019	(Qatar) Al Sadd	117	(Note: Xavi's previous references from official websites of some of the clubs he played and from football statistics databases are missing 2 official matches he played for Al Sadd in cups in Qatar, one in 2016 for the Emir Cup and one for the Qatar Cup in 2018.) (Note: Xavi additionally played 12 matches for the unofficial "national" team of Catalonia,)
24	(Spain) Xavi	MF	1,096	1997–2019	Spain	133	(Note: Xavi's previous references from official websites of some of the clubs he played and from football statistics databases are missing 2 official matches he played for Al Sadd in cups in Qatar, one in 2016 for the Emir Cup and one for the Qatar Cup in 2018.) (Note: Xavi additionally played 12 matches for the unofficial "national" team of Catalonia,)
24	(Spain) Xavi	MF	1,096	1997–2019	Spain U23	6	(Note: Xavi's previous references from official websites of some of the clubs he played and from football statistics databases are missing 2 official matches he played for Al Sadd in cups in Qatar, one in 2016 for the Emir Cup and one for the Qatar Cup in 2018.) (Note: Xavi additionally played 12 matches for the unofficial "national" team of Catalonia,)
25	(Bosnia and Herzegovina) **Edin Džeko**	FW	1,094+	2003–	(Bosnia and Herzegovina) Željezničar (Note: Edin Džeko played in 48 official matches for Željezničar, in which he scored 5 goals overall; 43 matches (3 goals) for the A team and 5 matches (2 goals) for the B team.)	48	
25	(Bosnia and Herzegovina) **Edin Džeko**	FW	1,094+	2003–	(Czech Republic) Teplice (Note: Edin Džeko played in 47 official matches for Teplice, in which he scored 16 goals overall.)	47	
25	(Bosnia and Herzegovina) **Edin Džeko**	FW	1,094+	2003–	(Czech Republic) Ústí nad Labem (Note: Edin Džeko played in 15 league matches for Ústí nad Labem, and in at least 2 matches in 2005–06 Czech Cup from the 4 matches the club played there.)	17+	
25	(Bosnia and Herzegovina) **Edin Džeko**	FW	1,094+	2003–	(Germany) VfL Wolfsburg	142	
25	(Bosnia and Herzegovina) **Edin Džeko**	FW	1,094+	2003–	(England) Manchester City (Note: Edin Džeko played in 189 official matches for Manchester City, in which he scored 72 goals.)	189	
25	(Bosnia and Herzegovina) **Edin Džeko**	FW	1,094+	2003–	(Italy) Roma	260	
25	(Bosnia and Herzegovina) **Edin Džeko**	FW	1,094+	2003–	(Italy) Inter Milan	101	
25	(Bosnia and Herzegovina) **Edin Džeko**	FW	1,094+	2003–	(Turkey) Fenerbahçe	99	
25	(Bosnia and Herzegovina) **Edin Džeko**	FW	1,094+	2003–	(Italy) Fiorentina	18	
25	(Bosnia and Herzegovina) **Edin Džeko**	FW	1,094+	2003–	(Germany) **Schalke 04**	**21**	
25	(Bosnia and Herzegovina) **Edin Džeko**	FW	1,094+	2003–	Bosnia and Herzegovina	152	
26	(Wales) Robbie James	MF	1,093+	1973–1998	(Wales) Swansea City	593	(Note: Robbie James' appearances for Merthyr Tydfil and Llanelli are league matches only.)
26	(Wales) Robbie James	MF	1,093+	1973–1998	(England) Stoke City	56	(Note: Robbie James' appearances for Merthyr Tydfil and Llanelli are league matches only.)
26	(Wales) Robbie James	MF	1,093+	1973–1998	(England) Queens Park Rangers	101	(Note: Robbie James' appearances for Merthyr Tydfil and Llanelli are league matches only.)
26	(Wales) Robbie James	MF	1,093+	1973–1998	(England) Leicester City	29	(Note: Robbie James' appearances for Merthyr Tydfil and Llanelli are league matches only.)
26	(Wales) Robbie James	MF	1,093+	1973–1998	(England) Bradford City	109	(Note: Robbie James' appearances for Merthyr Tydfil and Llanelli are league matches only.)
26	(Wales) Robbie James	MF	1,093+	1973–1998	(Wales) Cardiff City (Note: Robbie James made 68 appearances for Cardiff City.)	68	(Note: Robbie James' appearances for Merthyr Tydfil and Llanelli are league matches only.)
26	(Wales) Robbie James	MF	1,093+	1973–1998	(Wales) Merthyr Tydfil	16+	(Note: Robbie James' appearances for Merthyr Tydfil and Llanelli are league matches only.)
26	(Wales) Robbie James	MF	1,093+	1973–1998	(Wales) Barry Town	38	(Note: Robbie James' appearances for Merthyr Tydfil and Llanelli are league matches only.)
26	(Wales) Robbie James	MF	1,093+	1973–1998	(Wales) Inter Cardiff	?	(Note: Robbie James' appearances for Merthyr Tydfil and Llanelli are league matches only.)
26	(Wales) Robbie James	MF	1,093+	1973–1998	(Wales) Llanelli	36+	(Note: Robbie James' appearances for Merthyr Tydfil and Llanelli are league matches only.)
26	(Wales) Robbie James	MF	1,093+	1973–1998	(England) Weston-super-Mare	?	(Note: Robbie James' appearances for Merthyr Tydfil and Llanelli are league matches only.)
26	(Wales) Robbie James	MF	1,093+	1973–1998	Wales	47	(Note: Robbie James' appearances for Merthyr Tydfil and Llanelli are league matches only.)
27	(Spain) Iker Casillas	GK	1,085	1998–2019	(Spain) Real Madrid C	33	
27	(Spain) Iker Casillas	GK	1,085	1998–2019	(Spain) Real Madrid B	4	
27	(Spain) Iker Casillas	GK	1,085	1998–2019	(Spain) Real Madrid	725	
27	(Spain) Iker Casillas	GK	1,085	1998–2019	(Portugal) Porto	156	
27	(Spain) Iker Casillas	GK	1,085	1998–2019	Spain	167	
28	(Wales) Neville Southall	GK	1,078+	1973–2002	(Wales) Llandudno Town	1+	(Note: Neville Southall won 93 caps for Wales.)
28	(Wales) Neville Southall	GK	1,078+	1973–2002	(Wales) Bangor City (Note: Neville Southall played in at least 6 matches for Bangor City.)	6+	(Note: Neville Southall won 93 caps for Wales.)
28	(Wales) Neville Southall	GK	1,078+	1973–2002	(Wales) Conwy United	1+	(Note: Neville Southall won 93 caps for Wales.)
28	(Wales) Neville Southall	GK	1,078+	1973–2002	(England) Winsford United (Note: Neville Southall played in at least 3 matches for Winsford United.)	3+	(Note: Neville Southall won 93 caps for Wales.)
28	(Wales) Neville Southall	GK	1,078+	1973–2002	(England) Bury	49	(Note: Neville Southall won 93 caps for Wales.)
28	(Wales) Neville Southall	GK	1,078+	1973–2002	(England) Everton	751	(Note: Neville Southall won 93 caps for Wales.)
28	(Wales) Neville Southall	GK	1,078+	1973–2002	(England) Port Vale	9	(Note: Neville Southall won 93 caps for Wales.)
28	(Wales) Neville Southall	GK	1,078+	1973–2002	(England) Southend United	9	(Note: Neville Southall won 93 caps for Wales.)
28	(Wales) Neville Southall	GK	1,078+	1973–2002	(England) Stoke City	12	(Note: Neville Southall won 93 caps for Wales.)
28	(Wales) Neville Southall	GK	1,078+	1973–2002	(England) Doncaster Rovers	9	(Note: Neville Southall won 93 caps for Wales.)
28	(Wales) Neville Southall	GK	1,078+	1973–2002	(England) Torquay United	61	(Note: Neville Southall won 93 caps for Wales.)
28	(Wales) Neville Southall	GK	1,078+	1973–2002	(England) Huddersfield Town	?	(Note: Neville Southall won 93 caps for Wales.)
28	(Wales) Neville Southall	GK	1,078+	1973–2002	(England) Bradford City	1	(Note: Neville Southall won 93 caps for Wales.)
28	(Wales) Neville Southall	GK	1,078+	1973–2002	(Wales) Rhyl	7	(Note: Neville Southall won 93 caps for Wales.)
28	(Wales) Neville Southall	GK	1,078+	1973–2002	(England) Shrewsbury Town	?	(Note: Neville Southall won 93 caps for Wales.)
28	(Wales) Neville Southall	GK	1,078+	1973–2002	(England) Dover Athletic	?	(Note: Neville Southall won 93 caps for Wales.)
28	(Wales) Neville Southall	GK	1,078+	1973–2002	(England) Dagenham & Redbridge	?	(Note: Neville Southall won 93 caps for Wales.)
28	(Wales) Neville Southall	GK	1,078+	1973–2002	Wales	93	(Note: Neville Southall won 93 caps for Wales.)
28	(Brazil) Zinho	MF/FW	1,078+	1986–2007	(Brazil) Flamengo	365	
28	(Brazil) Zinho	MF/FW	1,078+	1986–2007	(Brazil) Palmeiras	316	
28	(Brazil) Zinho	MF/FW	1,078+	1986–2007	(Japan) Yokohama Flügels	107	
28	(Brazil) Zinho	MF/FW	1,078+	1986–2007	(Brazil) Grêmio	146	
28	(Brazil) Zinho	MF/FW	1,078+	1986–2007	(Brazil) Cruzeiro	32	
28	(Brazil) Zinho	MF/FW	1,078+	1986–2007	(Brazil) Nova Iguaçu	4+	
28	(Brazil) Zinho	MF/FW	1,078+	1986–2007	(United States) Miami FC	53	
28	(Brazil) Zinho	MF/FW	1,078+	1986–2007	Brazil	55	
30	(Japan) **Kazuyoshi Miura**	MF/FW	1,076+	1985–	(Brazil) Juventus-SP	?	
30	(Japan) **Kazuyoshi Miura**	MF/FW	1,076+	1985–	(Brazil) Santos (Note: Kazuyoshi Miura played in at least 43 official matches for Santos; 4 matches in the Copa São Paulo de Futebol Júnior, 13 matches in the Brasileirão, and 26 matches in the Paulistão.)	39+	
30	(Japan) **Kazuyoshi Miura**	MF/FW	1,076+	1985–	(Brazil) Palmeiras (Note: Kazuyoshi Miura played in at least 25 official matches for Palmeiras.)	25+	
30	(Japan) **Kazuyoshi Miura**	MF/FW	1,076+	1985–	(Brazil) Matsubara (Note: Kazuyoshi Miura played in at least 6 official matches for Matsubara; 5 matches for the Paranaense in 1987 and at least once in 1986, for the Torneio Brasil Sul de 1986, a tournament organized by the Brazilian Football Confederation (CBF) for the main teams from the South Region of Brazil that were left out of the 1986 Brazilian championship, where he may have played up to 10 matches, as each club played a total of 10 matches, but, having only one set of lineup, he cannot be credited with more than one appearance.)	6+	
30	(Japan) **Kazuyoshi Miura**	MF/FW	1,076+	1985–	(Brazil) Clube de Regatas Brasil (Note: Kazuyoshi Miura played in 4 official matches for Clube de Regatas Brasil (CRB) in 1987; 4 matches in the "White Module", which weren't recognized by the Brazilian Football Confederation, even though they were organized by them, but they are included here for two reasons: i) they were played under rules and regulations of official matches, ii) the football databases include these matches.)	4	
30	(Japan) **Kazuyoshi Miura**	MF/FW	1,076+	1985–	(Brazil) XV de Jaú (Note: Kazuyoshi Miura played for XV de Jaú, with which has been also linked as his first club in Brazil, as early as 1982, and with which was on a tour of friendly matches in Japan in 1985, thanks to exchange programs he participated back then, in at least 27 official matches; at least 2 matches in 1985, with the one for the Campeonato Paulista on 24 November 1985 being for him the first professional match to play, even though not the first as a professional player, because Brazilian football allowed non-professional footballers to play up to 2 professional matches back then, as he became professional at Santos in 1986, and 25 in 1988 for the Campeonato Paulista.)	26+	
30	(Japan) **Kazuyoshi Miura**	MF/FW	1,076+	1985–	(Brazil) Coritiba (Note: Kazuyoshi Miura played in 59 official matches for Coritiba, and because of other reliable sources having him playing 45 matches in 1989 and 14 in 1988, as well as to sources having him with a total of more than 50 matches, however it must be, though, also noted that the site of Coritiba has him with a total of 44 in a related article, as well as the site of Historia do Coritiba (for verification, go to HistoriaDoCoritiba.com.br, then to "Atletas" from the menu bar located right on the top and search with the key "Kazu" in the "Apelido" field), a site run by the Historical Research Group of Coritiba, but, as it usually happens for statistical purposes, i.e. for comparisons between players, they could well be referring only to the league matches or only to matches with the A team.)	59	
30	(Japan) **Kazuyoshi Miura**	MF/FW	1,076+	1985–	(Japan) Verdy Kawasaki (Note: Kazuyoshi Miura, including the matches played for Yomiuri Football Club, which changed its name to Verdy Kawasaki in 1992, played in a total of 253 official matches for Verdy Kawasaki,)	253	
30	(Japan) **Kazuyoshi Miura**	MF/FW	1,076+	1985–	(Italy) Genoa	23	
30	(Japan) **Kazuyoshi Miura**	MF/FW	1,076+	1985–	Croatia Zagreb	12	
30	(Japan) **Kazuyoshi Miura**	MF/FW	1,076+	1985–	(Japan) Kyoto Purple Sanga	51	
30	(Japan) **Kazuyoshi Miura**	MF/FW	1,076+	1985–	(Japan) Vissel Kobe	127	
30	(Japan) **Kazuyoshi Miura**	MF/FW	1,076+	1985–	(Japan) Yokohama FC (Note: Kazuyoshi Miura played in 298 official matches for Yokohama FC, scoring 32 times in them.)	298	
30	(Japan) **Kazuyoshi Miura**	MF/FW	1,076+	1985–	(Australia) Sydney FC (Note: Kazuyoshi Miura played in 6 official matches for Sydney FC, scoring 2 times in them, specifically in 4 matches for the A-League and 2 matches in FIFA Club World Championship.)	6	
30	(Japan) **Kazuyoshi Miura**	MF/FW	1,076+	1985–	(Japan) Atletico Suzuka (Note: Kazuyoshi Miura played for the club when it was named Suzuka Point Getters in 2022 and returned to the club on a second loan in 2024 when it had been renamed to Atletico Suzuka Club.)	37	
30	(Japan) **Kazuyoshi Miura**	MF/FW	1,076+	1985–	(Portugal) Oliveirense	9	
30	(Japan) **Kazuyoshi Miura**	MF/FW	1,076+	1985–	(Japan) **Fukushima United**	**9**	
30	(Japan) **Kazuyoshi Miura**	MF/FW	1,076+	1985–	Japan	90	
30	(Japan) **Kazuyoshi Miura**	MF/FW	1,076+	1985–	Japan B (Note: Kazuyoshi Miura played 2 times for a Japan B side, and for that he is often mentioned in publications with the total, i.e. having played in 91 matches for Japan)	2	
31	(Uruguay) **Luis Suárez**	MF/FW	1,068	2005–	(Uruguay) Nacional	51	
31	(Uruguay) **Luis Suárez**	MF/FW	1,068	2005–	(Netherlands) Groningen	37	
31	(Uruguay) **Luis Suárez**	MF/FW	1,068	2005–	(Netherlands) Ajax	159	
31	(Uruguay) **Luis Suárez**	MF/FW	1,068	2005–	(England) Liverpool	133	
31	(Uruguay) **Luis Suárez**	MF/FW	1,068	2005–	(Spain) Barcelona	284	
31	(Uruguay) **Luis Suárez**	MF/FW	1,068	2005–	(Spain) Atlético Madrid	83	
31	(Uruguay) **Luis Suárez**	MF/FW	1,068	2005–	(Brazil) Grêmio	54	
31	(Uruguay) **Luis Suárez**	MF/FW	1,068	2005–	(United States) **Inter Miami**	**120**	
31	(Uruguay) **Luis Suárez**	MF/FW	1,068	2005–	Uruguay	143	
31	(Uruguay) **Luis Suárez**	MF/FW	1,068	2005–	Uruguay U23	3	
32	(Brazil) Zé Roberto	DF/MF/FW	1,067	1994–2017	(Brazil) Portuguesa	132	
32	(Brazil) Zé Roberto	DF/MF/FW	1,067	1994–2017	(Spain) Real Madrid	24	
32	(Brazil) Zé Roberto	DF/MF/FW	1,067	1994–2017	(Brazil) Flamengo	23	
32	(Brazil) Zé Roberto	DF/MF/FW	1,067	1994–2017	(Germany) Bayer Leverkusen	150	
32	(Brazil) Zé Roberto	DF/MF/FW	1,067	1994–2017	(Germany) Bayern Munich	248	
32	(Brazil) Zé Roberto	DF/MF/FW	1,067	1994–2017	(Brazil) Santos	61	
32	(Brazil) Zé Roberto	DF/MF/FW	1,067	1994–2017	(Germany) Hamburger SV	72	
32	(Brazil) Zé Roberto	DF/MF/FW	1,067	1994–2017	(Qatar) Al-Gharafa	26	
32	(Brazil) Zé Roberto	DF/MF/FW	1,067	1994–2017	(Brazil) Grêmio	119	
32	(Brazil) Zé Roberto	DF/MF/FW	1,067	1994–2017	(Brazil) Palmeiras (Note: Zé Roberto played in 128 official matches for Palmeiras)	128	
32	(Brazil) Zé Roberto	DF/MF/FW	1,067	1994–2017	Brazil	84	
33	(Brazil) Dani Alves	DF/MF	1,063	2001–2023	(Brazil) Bahia	58	
33	(Brazil) Dani Alves	DF/MF	1,063	2001–2023	(Spain) Sevilla	250	
33	(Brazil) Dani Alves	DF/MF	1,063	2001–2023	(Spain) Barcelona	408	
33	(Brazil) Dani Alves	DF/MF	1,063	2001–2023	(Italy) Juventus	33	
33	(Brazil) Dani Alves	DF/MF	1,063	2001–2023	(France) Paris Saint-Germain	73	
33	(Brazil) Dani Alves	DF/MF	1,063	2001–2023	(Brazil) São Paulo	95	
33	(Brazil) Dani Alves	DF/MF	1,063	2001–2023	(Mexico) UNAM	13	
33	(Brazil) Dani Alves	DF/MF	1,063	2001–2023	Brazil	126	
33	(Brazil) Dani Alves	DF/MF	1,063	2001–2023	Brazil Olympic team	7	
34	(Spain) **Sergio Ramos**	DF	1,061	2003–	(Spain) Sevilla Atlético	31	
34	(Spain) **Sergio Ramos**	DF	1,061	2003–	(Spain) Sevilla	87	
34	(Spain) **Sergio Ramos**	DF	1,061	2003–	(Spain) Real Madrid	671	
34	(Spain) **Sergio Ramos**	DF	1,061	2003–	(France) Paris Saint-Germain	58	
34	(Spain) **Sergio Ramos**	DF	1,061	2003–	(Mexico) Monterrey	34	
34	(Spain) **Sergio Ramos**	DF	1,061	2003–	Spain	180	
35	(England) Alan Ball	MF	1,058+	1960–1983	(England) Ashton United	7	(Note: Alan Ball's appearances for Hellenic and Eastern are league matches only.)
35	(England) Alan Ball	MF	1,058+	1960–1983	(England) Blackpool	164	(Note: Alan Ball's appearances for Hellenic and Eastern are league matches only.)
35	(England) Alan Ball	MF	1,058+	1960–1983	(England) Everton	255	(Note: Alan Ball's appearances for Hellenic and Eastern are league matches only.)
35	(England) Alan Ball	MF	1,058+	1960–1983	(England) Arsenal	218	(Note: Alan Ball's appearances for Hellenic and Eastern are league matches only.)
35	(England) Alan Ball	MF	1,058+	1960–1983	(South Africa) Hellenic	4+	(Note: Alan Ball's appearances for Hellenic and Eastern are league matches only.)
35	(England) Alan Ball	MF	1,058+	1960–1983	(England) Southampton	234	(Note: Alan Ball's appearances for Hellenic and Eastern are league matches only.)
35	(England) Alan Ball	MF	1,058+	1960–1983	(United States) Philadelphia Fury	33	(Note: Alan Ball's appearances for Hellenic and Eastern are league matches only.)
35	(England) Alan Ball	MF	1,058+	1960–1983	(Canada) Vancouver Whitecaps	31	(Note: Alan Ball's appearances for Hellenic and Eastern are league matches only.)
35	(England) Alan Ball	MF	1,058+	1960–1983	(Australia) Floreat Athena	3	(Note: Alan Ball's appearances for Hellenic and Eastern are league matches only.)
35	(England) Alan Ball	MF	1,058+	1960–1983	(Hong Kong) Eastern	12+	(Note: Alan Ball's appearances for Hellenic and Eastern are league matches only.)
35	(England) Alan Ball	MF	1,058+	1960–1983	(England) Bristol Rovers	17	(Note: Alan Ball's appearances for Hellenic and Eastern are league matches only.)
35	(England) Alan Ball	MF	1,058+	1960–1983	England	72	(Note: Alan Ball's appearances for Hellenic and Eastern are league matches only.)
35	(England) Alan Ball	MF	1,058+	1960–1983	England U23	8	(Note: Alan Ball's appearances for Hellenic and Eastern are league matches only.)
36	(Brazil) Rivaldo	MF/FW	1,055+	1989–2015	(Brazil) Paulista	48+	(Note: Rivaldo's appearances for Paulista and Kabuscorp are league matches only.)
36	(Brazil) Rivaldo	MF/FW	1,055+	1989–2015	(Brazil) Santa Cruz	54	(Note: Rivaldo's appearances for Paulista and Kabuscorp are league matches only.)
36	(Brazil) Rivaldo	MF/FW	1,055+	1989–2015	(Brazil) Mogi Mirim	48	(Note: Rivaldo's appearances for Paulista and Kabuscorp are league matches only.)
36	(Brazil) Rivaldo	MF/FW	1,055+	1989–2015	(Brazil) Corinthians (Note: Rivaldo played in 58 official matches for Corinthians)	58	(Note: Rivaldo's appearances for Paulista and Kabuscorp are league matches only.)
36	(Brazil) Rivaldo	MF/FW	1,055+	1989–2015	(Brazil) Palmeiras (Note: Rivaldo played in 120 official matches for Palmeiras)	120	(Note: Rivaldo's appearances for Paulista and Kabuscorp are league matches only.)
36	(Brazil) Rivaldo	MF/FW	1,055+	1989–2015	(Spain) Deportivo La Coruña	46	(Note: Rivaldo's appearances for Paulista and Kabuscorp are league matches only.)
36	(Brazil) Rivaldo	MF/FW	1,055+	1989–2015	(Spain) Barcelona	235	(Note: Rivaldo's appearances for Paulista and Kabuscorp are league matches only.)
36	(Brazil) Rivaldo	MF/FW	1,055+	1989–2015	(Italy) Milan	40	(Note: Rivaldo's appearances for Paulista and Kabuscorp are league matches only.)
36	(Brazil) Rivaldo	MF/FW	1,055+	1989–2015	(Brazil) Cruzeiro	10	(Note: Rivaldo's appearances for Paulista and Kabuscorp are league matches only.)
36	(Brazil) Rivaldo	MF/FW	1,055+	1989–2015	(Greece) Olympiacos Piraeus	101	(Note: Rivaldo's appearances for Paulista and Kabuscorp are league matches only.)
36	(Brazil) Rivaldo	MF/FW	1,055+	1989–2015	(Greece) AEK Athens	44	(Note: Rivaldo's appearances for Paulista and Kabuscorp are league matches only.)
36	(Brazil) Rivaldo	MF/FW	1,055+	1989–2015	(Uzbekistan) Bunyodkor	80	(Note: Rivaldo's appearances for Paulista and Kabuscorp are league matches only.)
36	(Brazil) Rivaldo	MF/FW	1,055+	1989–2015	(Brazil) São Paulo	47	(Note: Rivaldo's appearances for Paulista and Kabuscorp are league matches only.)
36	(Brazil) Rivaldo	MF/FW	1,055+	1989–2015	(Angola) Kabuscorp	21+	(Note: Rivaldo's appearances for Paulista and Kabuscorp are league matches only.)
36	(Brazil) Rivaldo	MF/FW	1,055+	1989–2015	(Brazil) São Caetano	19	(Note: Rivaldo's appearances for Paulista and Kabuscorp are league matches only.)
36	(Brazil) Rivaldo	MF/FW	1,055+	1989–2015	Brazil	77	(Note: Rivaldo's appearances for Paulista and Kabuscorp are league matches only.)
36	(Brazil) Rivaldo	MF/FW	1,055+	1989–2015	Brazil Olympic team	7	(Note: Rivaldo's appearances for Paulista and Kabuscorp are league matches only.)
37	(Scotland) Graeme Armstrong	DF/MF/FW	1,053	1974 or 1975–2001 (Note: There is no source for Graeme Armstrong's debut other than that he played in the 1974–75 season and that he was 18 years old, so his debut could have been in 1974 or in 1975.)	(Scotland) Meadowbank Thistle	355+	
37	(Scotland) Graeme Armstrong	DF/MF/FW	1,053	1974 or 1975–2001	(Scotland) Stirling Albion (Note: Only league matches are included.)	204+	
37	(Scotland) Graeme Armstrong	DF/MF/FW	1,053	1974 or 1975–2001	(England) Berwick Rangers	83+	
37	(Scotland) Graeme Armstrong	DF/MF/FW	1,053	1974 or 1975–2001	(Scotland) Stenhousemuir	268+	
37	(Scotland) Graeme Armstrong	DF/MF/FW	1,053	1974 or 1975–2001	(Scotland) Alloa Athletic	1+	
38	(Paraguay) **Roque Santa Cruz**	MF/FW	1,052	1997–	(Paraguay) Olimpia (Note: Roque Santa Cruz played in total in 10 Copa Paraguay matches for Olimpia and scored 5 times in them; 5 matches and 4 goals in 2018 Copa Paraguay, in 0 matches in 2019 Copa Paraguay and in 5 matches and 1 goal in 2021 Copa Paraguay.)	239	
38	(Paraguay) **Roque Santa Cruz**	MF/FW	1,052	1997–	(Germany) Bayern Munich	238	
38	(Paraguay) **Roque Santa Cruz**	MF/FW	1,052	1997–	(Germany) Bayern Munich II	6	
38	(Paraguay) **Roque Santa Cruz**	MF/FW	1,052	1997–	(England) Blackburn Rovers	80	
38	(Paraguay) **Roque Santa Cruz**	MF/FW	1,052	1997–	(England) Manchester City	24	
38	(Paraguay) **Roque Santa Cruz**	MF/FW	1,052	1997–	(Spain) Real Betis	35	
38	(Paraguay) **Roque Santa Cruz**	MF/FW	1,052	1997–	(Spain) Málaga	109	
38	(Paraguay) **Roque Santa Cruz**	MF/FW	1,052	1997–	(Mexico) Cruz Azul	11	
38	(Paraguay) **Roque Santa Cruz**	MF/FW	1,052	1997–	(Paraguay) Libertad (Note: Roque Santa Cruz played in total in 13 Copa Paraguay matches for Libertad and scored 3 times in them; 2 matches and 1 goal in 2022 Copa Paraguay; the first match was suspended after 53 minutes of play, where Roque Santa Cruz scored 1 goal, with Libertad leading 4–0, due to crowd disturbances, but was eventually declared as ended and awarded to Libertad, 5 matches and 0 goals in 2023 Copa Paraguay, 5 matches and 2 goals in 2024 Copa Paraguay and in 1 match and 0 goals in 2025 Copa Paraguay.)	171	
38	(Paraguay) **Roque Santa Cruz**	MF/FW	1,052	1997–	(Paraguay) **Nacional**	**22**	
38	(Paraguay) **Roque Santa Cruz**	MF/FW	1,052	1997–	Paraguay	113	
38	(Paraguay) **Roque Santa Cruz**	MF/FW	1,052	1997–	Paraguay Olympic team	4	
39	(Spain) Raúl	MF/FW	1,048	1994–2015	(Spain) Real Madrid C	9	
39	(Spain) Raúl	MF/FW	1,048	1994–2015	(Spain) Real Madrid B	1	
39	(Spain) Raúl	MF/FW	1,048	1994–2015	(Spain) Real Madrid	741	
39	(Spain) Raúl	MF/FW	1,048	1994–2015	(Germany) Schalke 04	98	
39	(Spain) Raúl	MF/FW	1,048	1994–2015	(Qatar) Al Sadd	61	
39	(Spain) Raúl	MF/FW	1,048	1994–2015	(United States) New York Cosmos	32	
39	(Spain) Raúl	MF/FW	1,048	1994–2015	Spain	102	
39	(Spain) Raúl	MF/FW	1,048	1994–2015	Spain Olympic team	4	
40	(Northern Ireland) Glenn Ferguson	FW	1,047	1987–2011	(Northern Ireland) Ards	72	(Note: Glenn Ferguson additionally played four times for an Irish League representative team)
40	(Northern Ireland) Glenn Ferguson	FW	1,047	1987–2011	(Northern Ireland) Glenavon	367	(Note: Glenn Ferguson additionally played four times for an Irish League representative team)
40	(Northern Ireland) Glenn Ferguson	FW	1,047	1987–2011	(Northern Ireland) Linfield	519	(Note: Glenn Ferguson additionally played four times for an Irish League representative team)
40	(Northern Ireland) Glenn Ferguson	FW	1,047	1987–2011	(Northern Ireland) Lisburn Distillery	82	(Note: Glenn Ferguson additionally played four times for an Irish League representative team)
40	(Northern Ireland) Glenn Ferguson	FW	1,047	1987–2011	Northern Ireland	5	(Note: Glenn Ferguson additionally played four times for an Irish League representative team)
40	(Northern Ireland) Glenn Ferguson	FW	1,047	1987–2011	Northern Ireland B	2	(Note: Glenn Ferguson additionally played four times for an Irish League representative team)
41	(England) **Jon Challinor**	DF/MF	1,046+	1998–	(England) Rushden & Diamonds	63	
41	(England) **Jon Challinor**	DF/MF	1,046+	1998–	(England) **Stamford** (Note: Jon Challinor played in at least 466 official matches for Stamford.)	**466+**	
41	(England) **Jon Challinor**	DF/MF	1,046+	1998–	(England) Cambridge City	57	
41	(England) **Jon Challinor**	DF/MF	1,046+	1998–	(England) St Albans City (Note: Jon Challinor played in 57 official matches for St Albans City and scored 6 times in them.)	57	
41	(England) **Jon Challinor**	DF/MF	1,046+	1998–	(United States) Kalamazoo Kingdom (Note: Jon Challinor played in 17 official matches for Kalamazoo Kingdom.)	17	
41	(England) **Jon Challinor**	DF/MF	1,046+	1998–	(England) Aldershot Town (Note: Jon Challinor played in at least 98 official matches for Aldershot Town and scored 21 times in them; at least 56 matches in the 2003–04 season, in which he scored 12 goals, and at least 42 matches in the 2004–05 season, in which he scored 9 goals.)	98+	
41	(England) **Jon Challinor**	DF/MF	1,046+	1998–	(England) Exeter City	97	
41	(England) **Jon Challinor**	DF/MF	1,046+	1998–	(England) Cambridge United	42	
41	(England) **Jon Challinor**	DF/MF	1,046+	1998–	(England) Forest Green Rovers	7	
41	(England) **Jon Challinor**	DF/MF	1,046+	1998–	(England) Mansfield Town	21	
41	(England) **Jon Challinor**	DF/MF	1,046+	1998–	(England) Gateshead	?	
41	(England) **Jon Challinor**	DF/MF	1,046+	1998–	(England) Brackley Town	?	
41	(England) **Jon Challinor**	DF/MF	1,046+	1998–	(Wales) Newport County (Note: Jon Challinor played in 4 official matches for Newport County and scored 1 goal in them.)	4	
41	(England) **Jon Challinor**	DF/MF	1,046+	1998–	(England) Kettering Town	18	
41	(England) **Jon Challinor**	DF/MF	1,046+	1998–	(England) York City (Note: Jon Challinor played in 73 official matches for York City and scored 3 goals in them.)	73	
41	(England) **Jon Challinor**	DF/MF	1,046+	1998–	(England) FC Halifax Town (Note: Jon Challinor played in at least 5 official matches for FC Halifax Town.)	5+	
41	(England) **Jon Challinor**	DF/MF	1,046+	1998–	(England) Yaxley	1	
41	(England) **Jon Challinor**	DF/MF	1,046+	1998–	(England) Wisbech Town	19	
41	(England) **Jon Challinor**	DF/MF	1,046+	1998–	England C	1	
42	(England) David Seaman	GK	1,044	1982–2004	(England) Leeds United	1	
42	(England) David Seaman	GK	1,044	1982–2004	(England) Peterborough United	109	
42	(England) David Seaman	GK	1,044	1982–2004	(England) Birmingham City	84	
42	(England) David Seaman	GK	1,044	1982–2004	(England) Queens Park Rangers	175	
42	(England) David Seaman	GK	1,044	1982–2004	(England) Arsenal	568	
42	(England) David Seaman	GK	1,044	1982–2004	(England) Manchester City	26	
42	(England) David Seaman	GK	1,044	1982–2004	England	75	
42	(England) David Seaman	GK	1,044	1982–2004	England B	6	
42	(England) Stuart Pearce	DF	1,044	1979–2002; 2016	(England) Wealdstone (Note: Stuart Pearce played in 242 times for Wealdstone between 1979 and 1983, and scored 14 times in them.)	242	
42	(England) Stuart Pearce	DF	1,044	1979–2002; 2016	(England) Coventry City	54	
42	(England) Stuart Pearce	DF	1,044	1979–2002; 2016	(England) Nottingham Forest	524	
42	(England) Stuart Pearce	DF	1,044	1979–2002; 2016	(England) Newcastle United	52	
42	(England) Stuart Pearce	DF	1,044	1979–2002; 2016	(England) West Ham United	50	
42	(England) Stuart Pearce	DF	1,044	1979–2002; 2016	(England) Manchester City	43	
42	(England) Stuart Pearce	DF	1,044	1979–2002; 2016	(England) Longford	1	
42	(England) Stuart Pearce	DF	1,044	1979–2002; 2016	England	78	
44	(England) **Kevin Ellison**	MF/FW	1,043	1997–	(England) Southport	4	
44	(England) **Kevin Ellison**	MF/FW	1,043	1997–	(England) Chorley	4	
44	(England) **Kevin Ellison**	MF/FW	1,043	1997–	(Wales) Conwy United	37	
44	(England) **Kevin Ellison**	MF/FW	1,043	1997–	(England) Altrincham	69	
44	(England) **Kevin Ellison**	MF/FW	1,043	1997–	(England) Leicester City	1	
44	(England) **Kevin Ellison**	MF/FW	1,043	1997–	(England) Stockport County	52	
44	(England) **Kevin Ellison**	MF/FW	1,043	1997–	(England) Lincoln City	13	
44	(England) **Kevin Ellison**	MF/FW	1,043	1997–	(England) Chester City	111	
44	(England) **Kevin Ellison**	MF/FW	1,043	1997–	(England) Hull City	41	
44	(England) **Kevin Ellison**	MF/FW	1,043	1997–	(England) Tranmere Rovers	38	
44	(England) **Kevin Ellison**	MF/FW	1,043	1997–	(England) Rotherham United	74	
44	(England) **Kevin Ellison**	MF/FW	1,043	1997–	(England) Bradford City	7	
44	(England) **Kevin Ellison**	MF/FW	1,043	1997–	(England) Morecambe	391	
44	(England) **Kevin Ellison**	MF/FW	1,043	1997–	(Wales) Newport County	45	
44	(England) **Kevin Ellison**	MF/FW	1,043	1997–	(England) Warrington Rylands	3	
44	(England) **Kevin Ellison**	MF/FW	1,043	1997–	(England) City of Liverpool	28	
44	(England) **Kevin Ellison**	MF/FW	1,043	1997–	(England) Runcorn Town	14	
44	(England) **Kevin Ellison**	MF/FW	1,043	1997–	(England) **Vauxhall Motors** (Note: Kevin Ellison made 106 appearances for Vauxhall Motors.)	**111**	
45	(Paraguay) Paulo da Silva	DF	1,039+	1995–2024	(Paraguay) Atlántida (Note: Paulo da Silva played in at least 50 official matches for Atlántida; in at least 36 matches in his first stint (as NFT includes only league matches) and in 14 matches in his second stint.)	50+	
45	(Paraguay) Paulo da Silva	DF	1,039+	1995–2024	(Paraguay) Presidente Hayes	?	
45	(Paraguay) Paulo da Silva	DF	1,039+	1995–2024	(Paraguay) Sport Colombia (Note: Paulo da Silva played in at least 1 official match for Sport Colombia in 1997 Paraguayan Primera División season (Spanish article).)	1+	
45	(Paraguay) Paulo da Silva	DF	1,039+	1995–2024	(Paraguay) Cerro Porteño	45	
45	(Paraguay) Paulo da Silva	DF	1,039+	1995–2024	(Italy) Perugia	2	
45	(Paraguay) Paulo da Silva	DF	1,039+	1995–2024	(Argentina) Lanús	12	
45	(Paraguay) Paulo da Silva	DF	1,039+	1995–2024	(Italy) Venezia	9	
45	(Paraguay) Paulo da Silva	DF	1,039+	1995–2024	(Italy) Cosenza	2	
45	(Paraguay) Paulo da Silva	DF	1,039+	1995–2024	(Paraguay) Libertad (Note: Paulo da Silva played in 148 official matches for Libertad.)	148	
45	(Paraguay) Paulo da Silva	DF	1,039+	1995–2024	(Mexico) Toluca (Note: Paulo da Silva played in 424 official matches for Toluca; he played in 15 more matches, namely 10 matches (1 goal) in InterLiga (3 matches in 2004 InterLiga, 4 matches in 2005 InterLiga, and 3 matches in 2008 Interliga) 3 matches in repechages (2 in Apertura 2003 and 1 in Apertura 2006), and 2 matches in Campeón de Campeones (2 matches in 2006 Campeón de Campeones).)	424	
45	(Paraguay) Paulo da Silva	DF	1,039+	1995–2024	(Mexico) Tigres UANL	3	
45	(Paraguay) Paulo da Silva	DF	1,039+	1995–2024	(England) Sunderland	24	
45	(Paraguay) Paulo da Silva	DF	1,039+	1995–2024	(Spain) Zaragoza	42	
45	(Paraguay) Paulo da Silva	DF	1,039+	1995–2024	(Mexico) Pachuca	33	
45	(Paraguay) Paulo da Silva	DF	1,039+	1995–2024	(Paraguay) 12 de Octubre	76	
45	(Paraguay) Paulo da Silva	DF	1,039+	1995–2024	(Paraguay) Independiente CG	9	
45	(Paraguay) Paulo da Silva	DF	1,039+	1995–2024	(Paraguay) 12 de Junio (Note: Paulo da Silva played in 9 league matches for 12 de Junio in 2023 Paraguayan Primera B Nacional (Spanish article), based on posts from the official Instagram and Facebook accounts of Club 12 de Junio, from July to September 2023.)	9	
45	(Paraguay) Paulo da Silva	DF	1,039+	1995–2024	Paraguay	150	
45	(Paraguay) Paulo da Silva	DF	1,039+	1995–2024	Paraguay U23	9+	
46	(Dominica) Jefferson Louis	FW	1,037+	1996–2025	(England) Risborough Rangers	64+	
46	(Dominica) Jefferson Louis	FW	1,037+	1996–2025	(England) Thame United	95+	
46	(Dominica) Jefferson Louis	FW	1,037+	1996–2025	(England) Aylesbury United	15	
46	(Dominica) Jefferson Louis	FW	1,037+	1996–2025	(England) Oxford United	68	
46	(Dominica) Jefferson Louis	FW	1,037+	1996–2025	(England) Woking	37	
46	(Dominica) Jefferson Louis	FW	1,037+	1996–2025	(England) Gravesend & Northfleet	5	
46	(Dominica) Jefferson Louis	FW	1,037+	1996–2025	(England) Forest Green Rovers	12	
46	(Dominica) Jefferson Louis	FW	1,037+	1996–2025	(England) Bristol Rovers	10	
46	(Dominica) Jefferson Louis	FW	1,037+	1996–2025	(England) Hemel Hempstead Town	1	
46	(Dominica) Jefferson Louis	FW	1,037+	1996–2025	(England) Worthing	6	
46	(Dominica) Jefferson Louis	FW	1,037+	1996–2025	(England) Lewes	2	
46	(Dominica) Jefferson Louis	FW	1,037+	1996–2025	(England) Stevenage Borough	18	
46	(Dominica) Jefferson Louis	FW	1,037+	1996–2025	(England) Eastleigh	6	
46	(Dominica) Jefferson Louis	FW	1,037+	1996–2025	(England) Yeading	9	
46	(Dominica) Jefferson Louis	FW	1,037+	1996–2025	(England) Havant & Waterlooville	20	
46	(Dominica) Jefferson Louis	FW	1,037+	1996–2025	(England) Weymouth	27	
46	(Dominica) Jefferson Louis	FW	1,037+	1996–2025	(England) Maidenhead United	16	
46	(Dominica) Jefferson Louis	FW	1,037+	1996–2025	(England) Mansfield Town	19	
46	(Dominica) Jefferson Louis	FW	1,037+	1996–2025	(Wales) Wrexham	49	
46	(Dominica) Jefferson Louis	FW	1,037+	1996–2025	(England) Crawley Town	19	
46	(Dominica) Jefferson Louis	FW	1,037+	1996–2025	(England) Rushden & Diamonds	32	
46	(Dominica) Jefferson Louis	FW	1,037+	1996–2025	(England) Gainsborough Trinity	9	
46	(Dominica) Jefferson Louis	FW	1,037+	1996–2025	(England) Darlington	7	
46	(Dominica) Jefferson Louis	FW	1,037+	1996–2025	(England) Hayes & Yeading United	11	
46	(Dominica) Jefferson Louis	FW	1,037+	1996–2025	(England) Brackley Town	54	
46	(Dominica) Jefferson Louis	FW	1,037+	1996–2025	(England) Lincoln City	14	
46	(Dominica) Jefferson Louis	FW	1,037+	1996–2025	(Wales) Newport County	17	
46	(Dominica) Jefferson Louis	FW	1,037+	1996–2025	(England) Whitehawk	7	
46	(Dominica) Jefferson Louis	FW	1,037+	1996–2025	(England) Hendon	34	
46	(Dominica) Jefferson Louis	FW	1,037+	1996–2025	(England) Margate	17	
46	(Dominica) Jefferson Louis	FW	1,037+	1996–2025	(England) Lowestoft Town	21	
46	(Dominica) Jefferson Louis	FW	1,037+	1996–2025	(England) Wealdstone	67	
46	(Dominica) Jefferson Louis	FW	1,037+	1996–2025	(England) Staines Town	10	
46	(Dominica) Jefferson Louis	FW	1,037+	1996–2025	(England) Oxford City	32	
46	(Dominica) Jefferson Louis	FW	1,037+	1996–2025	(England) Banbury United	27	
46	(Dominica) Jefferson Louis	FW	1,037+	1996–2025	(England) Chesham United	78	
46	(Dominica) Jefferson Louis	FW	1,037+	1996–2025	(England) Farnborough	7	
46	(Dominica) Jefferson Louis	FW	1,037+	1996–2025	(England) Hampton & Richmond Borough	8	
46	(Dominica) Jefferson Louis	FW	1,037+	1996–2025	(England) St Albans City	14	
46	(Dominica) Jefferson Louis	FW	1,037+	1996–2025	(England) Beaconsfield Town	40	
46	(Dominica) Jefferson Louis	FW	1,037+	1996–2025	(England) North Leigh	26	
46	(Dominica) Jefferson Louis	FW	1,037+	1996–2025	(England) Slough Town	6	
46	(Dominica) Jefferson Louis	FW	1,037+	1996–2025	Dominica	1	
47	(Wales) Ryan Giggs	MF/FW	1,031	1990–2014	(England) Manchester United	963	
47	(Wales) Ryan Giggs	MF/FW	1,031	1990–2014	Wales	64	
47	(Wales) Ryan Giggs	MF/FW	1,031	1990–2014	(United Kingdom) Great Britain	4	
47	(Brazil) **Thiago Silva**	DF	1,031	2002–	(Brazil) RS Futebol	25	
47	(Brazil) **Thiago Silva**	DF	1,031	2002–	(Brazil) Juventude	36	
47	(Brazil) **Thiago Silva**	DF	1,031	2002–	(Portugal) Porto B	14	
47	(Brazil) **Thiago Silva**	DF	1,031	2002–	(Brazil) **Fluminense**	**227**	
47	(Brazil) **Thiago Silva**	DF	1,031	2002–	(Italy) Milan	119	
47	(Brazil) **Thiago Silva**	DF	1,031	2002–	(France) Paris Saint-Germain	317	
47	(Brazil) **Thiago Silva**	DF	1,031	2002–	(England) Chelsea	155	
47	(Brazil) **Thiago Silva**	DF	1,031	2002–	(Portugal) Porto	14	
47	(Brazil) **Thiago Silva**	DF	1,031	2002–	Brazil	113	
47	(Brazil) **Thiago Silva**	DF	1,031	2002–	Brazil U23	11	
49	(Italy) Paolo Maldini	DF	1,029	1985–2009	(Italy) Milan	902	
49	(Italy) Paolo Maldini	DF	1,029	1985–2009	Italy	126	
49	(Italy) Paolo Maldini	DF	1,029	1985–2009	Italy Olympic team	1	
50	(Spain) Andoni Zubizarreta	GK	1,026	1979–1998	(Spain) Alavés B	32	(Note: Andoni Zubizarreta additionally played 4 matches for the unofficial "national" team of Basque Country, with one of them being credited as international friendly by 11v11, and the team listed as "Basque Spain".)
50	(Spain) Andoni Zubizarreta	GK	1,026	1979–1998	(Spain) Alavés	4	(Note: Andoni Zubizarreta additionally played 4 matches for the unofficial "national" team of Basque Country, with one of them being credited as international friendly by 11v11, and the team listed as "Basque Spain".)
50	(Spain) Andoni Zubizarreta	GK	1,026	1979–1998	(Spain) Bilbao Athletic	7	(Note: Andoni Zubizarreta additionally played 4 matches for the unofficial "national" team of Basque Country, with one of them being credited as international friendly by 11v11, and the team listed as "Basque Spain".)
50	(Spain) Andoni Zubizarreta	GK	1,026	1979–1998	(Spain) Athletic Bilbao	239	(Note: Andoni Zubizarreta additionally played 4 matches for the unofficial "national" team of Basque Country, with one of them being credited as international friendly by 11v11, and the team listed as "Basque Spain".)
50	(Spain) Andoni Zubizarreta	GK	1,026	1979–1998	(Spain) Barcelona	410	(Note: Andoni Zubizarreta additionally played 4 matches for the unofficial "national" team of Basque Country, with one of them being credited as international friendly by 11v11, and the team listed as "Basque Spain".)
50	(Spain) Andoni Zubizarreta	GK	1,026	1979–1998	(Spain) Valencia	184	(Note: Andoni Zubizarreta additionally played 4 matches for the unofficial "national" team of Basque Country, with one of them being credited as international friendly by 11v11, and the team listed as "Basque Spain".)
50	(Spain) Andoni Zubizarreta	GK	1,026	1979–1998	Spain	126	(Note: Andoni Zubizarreta additionally played 4 matches for the unofficial "national" team of Basque Country, with one of them being credited as international friendly by 11v11, and the team listed as "Basque Spain".)
50	(Spain) Andoni Zubizarreta	GK	1,026	1979–1998	Spain Olympic team	1	(Note: Andoni Zubizarreta additionally played 4 matches for the unofficial "national" team of Basque Country, with one of them being credited as international friendly by 11v11, and the team listed as "Basque Spain".)
50	(Spain) Andoni Zubizarreta	GK	1,026	1979–1998	Spain U23	23	(Note: Andoni Zubizarreta additionally played 4 matches for the unofficial "national" team of Basque Country, with one of them being credited as international friendly by 11v11, and the team listed as "Basque Spain".)
51	(Scotland) Graham Alexander	DF/MF	1,025	1988–2012	(England) Scunthorpe United	202	
51	(Scotland) Graham Alexander	DF/MF	1,025	1988–2012	(England) Luton Town	183	
51	(Scotland) Graham Alexander	DF/MF	1,025	1988–2012	(England) Burnley	178	
51	(Scotland) Graham Alexander	DF/MF	1,025	1988–2012	(England) Preston North End	421	
51	(Scotland) Graham Alexander	DF/MF	1,025	1988–2012	Scotland	40	
51	(Scotland) Graham Alexander	DF/MF	1,025	1988–2012	Scotland B	1	
52	(Belgium) Timmy Simons	DF/MF	1,023	1995–2018	(Belgium) KTH Diest	88	
52	(Belgium) Timmy Simons	DF/MF	1,023	1995–2018	(Belgium) Lommel	74	
52	(Belgium) Timmy Simons	DF/MF	1,023	1995–2018	(Netherlands) PSV Eindhoven	218	
52	(Belgium) Timmy Simons	DF/MF	1,023	1995–2018	(Germany) 1. FC Nürnberg	110	
52	(Belgium) Timmy Simons	DF/MF	1,023	1995–2018	(Belgium) Club Brugge	439	
52	(Belgium) Timmy Simons	DF/MF	1,023	1995–2018	Belgium	94	
53	(England) Frank Lampard	MF	1,022	1995–2016	(England) West Ham United	187	
53	(England) Frank Lampard	MF	1,022	1995–2016	(Wales) Swansea City	11	
53	(England) Frank Lampard	MF	1,022	1995–2016	(England) Chelsea	648	
53	(England) Frank Lampard	MF	1,022	1995–2016	(England) Manchester City	38	
53	(England) Frank Lampard	MF	1,022	1995–2016	(United States) New York City FC	31	
53	(England) Frank Lampard	MF	1,022	1995–2016	England	106	
53	(England) Frank Lampard	MF	1,022	1995–2016	England B	1	
53	(Spain) Andrés Iniesta	MF/FW	1,022	2000–2024	(Spain) Barcelona B	54	(Note: Andrés Iniesta additionally played for the unofficial "national" team of Catalonia.)
53	(Spain) Andrés Iniesta	MF/FW	1,022	2000–2024	(Spain) Barcelona	679	(Note: Andrés Iniesta additionally played for the unofficial "national" team of Catalonia.)
53	(Spain) Andrés Iniesta	MF/FW	1,022	2000–2024	(Japan) Vissel Kobe (Note: A match against Johor Darul Ta'zim for the 2020 AFC Champions League was later considered annulled, because Johor Darul Ta'zim had to withdraw from the tournament after having played only two matches in the group stage, due to travelling issues because of the COVID-19 pandemic in Malaysia.)	135	(Note: Andrés Iniesta additionally played for the unofficial "national" team of Catalonia.)
53	(Spain) Andrés Iniesta	MF/FW	1,022	2000–2024	(United Arab Emirates) Emirates	23	(Note: Andrés Iniesta additionally played for the unofficial "national" team of Catalonia.)
53	(Spain) Andrés Iniesta	MF/FW	1,022	2000–2024	Spain	131	(Note: Andrés Iniesta additionally played for the unofficial "national" team of Catalonia.)
55	(England) **Peter Clarke**	DF	1,021	2001–	(England) Everton	14	
55	(England) **Peter Clarke**	DF	1,021	2001–	(England) Blackpool	150	
55	(England) **Peter Clarke**	DF	1,021	2001–	(England) Port Vale	13	
55	(England) **Peter Clarke**	DF	1,021	2001–	(England) Coventry City	5	
55	(England) **Peter Clarke**	DF	1,021	2001–	(England) Southend United	152	
55	(England) **Peter Clarke**	DF	1,021	2001–	(England) Huddersfield Town	224	
55	(England) **Peter Clarke**	DF	1,021	2001–	(England) Bury	68	
55	(England) **Peter Clarke**	DF	1,021	2001–	(England) Oldham Athletic	142	
55	(England) **Peter Clarke**	DF	1,021	2001–	(England) Fleetwood Town	17	
55	(England) **Peter Clarke**	DF	1,021	2001–	(England) Tranmere Rovers	114	
55	(England) **Peter Clarke**	DF	1,021	2001–	(England) Walsall	16	
55	(England) **Peter Clarke**	DF	1,021	2001–	(England) Warrington Town	74	
55	(England) **Peter Clarke**	DF	1,021	2001–	(England) **Prescot Cables** (Note: Peter Clarke played in 29 matches for Prescot Cables in the 2025–26 season and in 3 in the 2026–27 season.)	**32**	
55	(France) **Hugo Lloris**	GK	1,021	2004–	(France) Nice II	20	
55	(France) **Hugo Lloris**	GK	1,021	2004–	(France) Nice	78	
55	(France) **Hugo Lloris**	GK	1,021	2004–	(France) Lyon	202	
55	(France) **Hugo Lloris**	GK	1,021	2004–	(England) Tottenham Hotspur	447	
55	(France) **Hugo Lloris**	GK	1,021	2004–	(United States) **Los Angeles**	**129**	
55	(France) **Hugo Lloris**	GK	1,021	2004–	France	145	
57	(Spain) Sergio Busquets	DF/MF	1,019	2006–2025	(Spain) Barcelona C	1	
57	(Spain) Sergio Busquets	DF/MF	1,019	2006–2025	(Spain) Barcelona B	32	
57	(Spain) Sergio Busquets	DF/MF	1,019	2006–2025	(Spain) Barcelona	727	
57	(Spain) Sergio Busquets	DF/MF	1,019	2006–2025	(United States) Inter Miami	116	
57	(Spain) Sergio Busquets	DF/MF	1,019	2006–2025	Spain	143	
57	(Argentina) **Ángel Di María**	MF/FW	1,019	2005–	(Argentina) **Rosario Central**	**94**	
57	(Argentina) **Ángel Di María**	MF/FW	1,019	2005–	(Portugal) Benfica	217	
57	(Argentina) **Ángel Di María**	MF/FW	1,019	2005–	(Spain) Real Madrid	190	
57	(Argentina) **Ángel Di María**	MF/FW	1,019	2005–	(England) Manchester United	32	
57	(Argentina) **Ángel Di María**	MF/FW	1,019	2005–	(France) Paris Saint-Germain	295	
57	(Argentina) **Ángel Di María**	MF/FW	1,019	2005–	(Italy) Juventus	40	
57	(Argentina) **Ángel Di María**	MF/FW	1,019	2005–	Argentina	145	
57	(Argentina) **Ángel Di María**	MF/FW	1,019	2005–	Argentina U23	6	
59	(England) Ian Callaghan	MF/FW	1,018+	1960–1982	(England) Liverpool	870	(Note: Ian Callaghan's appearances for Cork United are league matches only.)
59	(England) Ian Callaghan	MF/FW	1,018+	1960–1982	(United States) Fort Lauderdale Strikers	20	(Note: Ian Callaghan's appearances for Cork United are league matches only.)
59	(England) Ian Callaghan	MF/FW	1,018+	1960–1982	(Wales) Swansea City	91	(Note: Ian Callaghan's appearances for Cork United are league matches only.)
59	(England) Ian Callaghan	MF/FW	1,018+	1960–1982	(Australia) Canberra City (Note: Ian Callaghan played 10 times for Canberra City; 9 in the league and once in the cup.)	10	(Note: Ian Callaghan's appearances for Cork United are league matches only.)
59	(England) Ian Callaghan	MF/FW	1,018+	1960–1982	(Republic of Ireland) Cork United	2+	(Note: Ian Callaghan's appearances for Cork United are league matches only.)
59	(England) Ian Callaghan	MF/FW	1,018+	1960–1982	(England) Crewe Alexandra	17	(Note: Ian Callaghan's appearances for Cork United are league matches only.)
59	(England) Ian Callaghan	MF/FW	1,018+	1960–1982	England	4	(Note: Ian Callaghan's appearances for Cork United are league matches only.)
59	(England) Ian Callaghan	MF/FW	1,018+	1960–1982	England U23	4	(Note: Ian Callaghan's appearances for Cork United are league matches only.)
60	(France) **Karim Benzema**	MF/FW	1,016	2004–	(France) Lyon II	20	
60	(France) **Karim Benzema**	MF/FW	1,016	2004–	(France) Lyon	148	
60	(France) **Karim Benzema**	MF/FW	1,016	2004–	(Spain) Real Madrid	648	
60	(France) **Karim Benzema**	MF/FW	1,016	2004–	(Saudi Arabia) Al-Ittihad	87	
60	(France) **Karim Benzema**	MF/FW	1,016	2004–	(Saudi Arabia) Al-Hilal	16	
60	(France) **Karim Benzema**	MF/FW	1,016	2004–	France	97	
61	(Northern Ireland) Noel Bailie	DF/MF	1,014	1989–2011	(Northern Ireland) Linfield	1,013	
61	(Northern Ireland) Noel Bailie	DF/MF	1,014	1989–2011	Northern Ireland U23	1	
62	(England) David James	GK	1,013	1990–2014	(England) Watford	98	
62	(England) David James	GK	1,013	1990–2014	(England) Liverpool	277	
62	(England) David James	GK	1,013	1990–2014	(England) Aston Villa	85	
62	(England) David James	GK	1,013	1990–2014	(England) West Ham United	102	
62	(England) David James	GK	1,013	1990–2014	(England) Manchester City	100	
62	(England) David James	GK	1,013	1990–2014	(England) Portsmouth	158	
62	(England) David James	GK	1,013	1990–2014	(England) Bristol City	84	
62	(England) David James	GK	1,013	1990–2014	(England) Bournemouth	19	
62	(England) David James	GK	1,013	1990–2014	(Iceland) Vestmannaeyjar	23	
62	(England) David James	GK	1,013	1990–2014	(India) Kerala Blasters	12	
62	(England) David James	GK	1,013	1990–2014	England	53	
62	(England) David James	GK	1,013	1990–2014	England B	2	
63	(Scotland) Stuart McCall	MF	1,012	1982–2004	(England) Bradford City	475	
63	(Scotland) Stuart McCall	MF	1,012	1982–2004	(England) Everton	142	
63	(Scotland) Stuart McCall	MF	1,012	1982–2004	(Scotland) Rangers	265	
63	(Scotland) Stuart McCall	MF	1,012	1982–2004	(England) Sheffield United	90	
63	(Scotland) Stuart McCall	MF	1,012	1982–2004	Scotland	40	
63	(Chile) **Alexis Sánchez**	MF/FW	1,012	2005–	(Chile) Cobreloa	50	
63	(Chile) **Alexis Sánchez**	MF/FW	1,012	2005–	(Chile) Colo-Colo	49	
63	(Chile) **Alexis Sánchez**	MF/FW	1,012	2005–	(Argentina) River Plate	31	
63	(Chile) **Alexis Sánchez**	MF/FW	1,012	2005–	(Italy) Udinese	126	
63	(Chile) **Alexis Sánchez**	MF/FW	1,012	2005–	(Spain) Barcelona	142	
63	(Chile) **Alexis Sánchez**	MF/FW	1,012	2005–	(England) Arsenal	166	
63	(Chile) **Alexis Sánchez**	MF/FW	1,012	2005–	(England) Manchester United	45	
63	(Chile) **Alexis Sánchez**	MF/FW	1,012	2005–	(Italy) Inter Milan	142	
63	(Chile) **Alexis Sánchez**	MF/FW	1,012	2005–	(France) Marseille	44	
63	(Chile) **Alexis Sánchez**	MF/FW	1,012	2005–	(Spain) Sevilla	30	
63	(Chile) **Alexis Sánchez**	MF/FW	1,012	2005–	(United States) **CF Montréal**	**17**	
63	(Chile) **Alexis Sánchez**	MF/FW	1,012	2005–	**Chile**	**168**	
63	(Chile) **Alexis Sánchez**	MF/FW	1,012	2005–	Chile U23	2	
65	(England) Neil Redfearn	MF	1,010+	1983–2008	(England) Bolton Wanderers	41	
65	(England) Neil Redfearn	MF	1,010+	1983–2008	(England) Lincoln City	114	
65	(England) Neil Redfearn	MF	1,010+	1983–2008	(England) Doncaster Rovers	54	
65	(England) Neil Redfearn	MF	1,010+	1983–2008	(England) Crystal Palace	65	
65	(England) Neil Redfearn	MF	1,010+	1983–2008	(England) Watford (Note: Neil Redfearn played in 36 official matches for Watford.)	36	
65	(England) Neil Redfearn	MF	1,010+	1983–2008	(England) Oldham Athletic	74	
65	(England) Neil Redfearn	MF	1,010+	1983–2008	(England) Barnsley	338	
65	(England) Neil Redfearn	MF	1,010+	1983–2008	(England) Charlton Athletic	33	
65	(England) Neil Redfearn	MF	1,010+	1983–2008	(England) Bradford City	21	
65	(England) Neil Redfearn	MF	1,010+	1983–2008	(England) Wigan Athletic	31	
65	(England) Neil Redfearn	MF	1,010+	1983–2008	(England) Halifax Town	47	
65	(England) Neil Redfearn	MF	1,010+	1983–2008	(England) Boston United	58	
65	(England) Neil Redfearn	MF	1,010+	1983–2008	(England) Rochdale	9	
65	(England) Neil Redfearn	MF	1,010+	1983–2008	(England) Scarborough	61	
65	(England) Neil Redfearn	MF	1,010+	1983–2008	(England) Bradford Park Avenue (Note: Neil Redfearn played in at least 21 official matches for Bradford Park Avenue; he had played in 982 matches when he joined the club, made his 1,000th appearance for the club, and then he played in at least 3 more matches.)	21+	
65	(England) Neil Redfearn	MF	1,010+	1983–2008	(England) Stocksbridge Park Steels	2+	
65	(England) Neil Redfearn	MF	1,010+	1983–2008	(England) Frickley Athletic	1+	
65	(England) Neil Redfearn	MF	1,010+	1983–2008	(England) Bridlington Town	1+	
65	(England) Neil Redfearn	MF	1,010+	1983–2008	(England) AFC Emley	2+	
65	(England) Neil Redfearn	MF	1,010+	1983–2008	(England) Salford City	1+	
66	(England) Dannie Bulman	MF	1,003+	1995–2021	(England) Ashford Town (Note: Dannie Bulman played in at least 16 official matches for Ashford Town and scored 16 goals in them, with 15 of them being for the first team; at least 1 match for the 1994–95 season, having played at 15 years old, at least 1 match for the 1995–96 season, having made at 16 years old his debut for the first team, scored 7 goals in at least 6 matches for the 1996–97 season and 9 goals in at least 8 matches for the 1997–98 season.)	15+	
66	(England) Dannie Bulman	MF	1,003+	1995–2021	(England) Wycombe Wanderers	243	
66	(England) Dannie Bulman	MF	1,003+	1995–2021	(England) Stevenage Borough	95	
66	(England) Dannie Bulman	MF	1,003+	1995–2021	(England) Crawley Town (Note: Dannie Bulman played in 449 official matches for Crawley Town and scored at least 18 times in them.)	449	
66	(England) Dannie Bulman	MF	1,003+	1995–2021	(England) Oxford United	60	
66	(England) Dannie Bulman	MF	1,003+	1995–2021	(England) AFC Wimbledon	141	
67	(Scotland) Asa Hartford	MF	1,001+	1965–1991	(Scotland) Drumchapel Amateurs	?	(Note: Asa Hartford played in at least 5 official matches for Fort Lauderdale Sun in 1984 United Soccer League, in which he scored 1 goal.)
67	(Scotland) Asa Hartford	MF	1,001+	1965–1991	(England) West Bromwich Albion	274	(Note: Asa Hartford played in at least 5 official matches for Fort Lauderdale Sun in 1984 United Soccer League, in which he scored 1 goal.)
67	(Scotland) Asa Hartford	MF	1,001+	1965–1991	(England) Manchester City	321	(Note: Asa Hartford played in at least 5 official matches for Fort Lauderdale Sun in 1984 United Soccer League, in which he scored 1 goal.)
67	(Scotland) Asa Hartford	MF	1,001+	1965–1991	(England) Nottingham Forest	3	(Note: Asa Hartford played in at least 5 official matches for Fort Lauderdale Sun in 1984 United Soccer League, in which he scored 1 goal.)
67	(Scotland) Asa Hartford	MF	1,001+	1965–1991	(England) Everton (Note: Asa Hartford played in 98 official matches for Everton in which he scored 7 times.)	98	(Note: Asa Hartford played in at least 5 official matches for Fort Lauderdale Sun in 1984 United Soccer League, in which he scored 1 goal.)
67	(Scotland) Asa Hartford	MF	1,001+	1965–1991	(United States) Fort Lauderdale Sun	5+	(Note: Asa Hartford played in at least 5 official matches for Fort Lauderdale Sun in 1984 United Soccer League, in which he scored 1 goal.)
67	(Scotland) Asa Hartford	MF	1,001+	1965–1991	(England) Norwich City	40	(Note: Asa Hartford played in at least 5 official matches for Fort Lauderdale Sun in 1984 United Soccer League, in which he scored 1 goal.)
67	(Scotland) Asa Hartford	MF	1,001+	1965–1991	(England) Bolton Wanderers	101	(Note: Asa Hartford played in at least 5 official matches for Fort Lauderdale Sun in 1984 United Soccer League, in which he scored 1 goal.)
67	(Scotland) Asa Hartford	MF	1,001+	1965–1991	(England) Stockport County	52	(Note: Asa Hartford played in at least 5 official matches for Fort Lauderdale Sun in 1984 United Soccer League, in which he scored 1 goal.)
67	(Scotland) Asa Hartford	MF	1,001+	1965–1991	(England) Oldham Athletic	7	(Note: Asa Hartford played in at least 5 official matches for Fort Lauderdale Sun in 1984 United Soccer League, in which he scored 1 goal.)
67	(Scotland) Asa Hartford	MF	1,001+	1965–1991	(England) Shrewsbury Town	30	(Note: Asa Hartford played in at least 5 official matches for Fort Lauderdale Sun in 1984 United Soccer League, in which he scored 1 goal.)
67	(Scotland) Asa Hartford	MF	1,001+	1965–1991	(England) Boston United	15	(Note: Asa Hartford played in at least 5 official matches for Fort Lauderdale Sun in 1984 United Soccer League, in which he scored 1 goal.)
67	(Scotland) Asa Hartford	MF	1,001+	1965–1991	Scotland	50	(Note: Asa Hartford played in at least 5 official matches for Fort Lauderdale Sun in 1984 United Soccer League, in which he scored 1 goal.)
67	(Scotland) Asa Hartford	MF	1,001+	1965–1991	Scotland U23	5	(Note: Asa Hartford played in at least 5 official matches for Fort Lauderdale Sun in 1984 United Soccer League, in which he scored 1 goal.)

== See also ==
- List of men's footballers with 100 or more international caps
- List of football managers with the most matches
- List of men's footballers with 500 or more goals
- List of world association football records
- List of one-club men in football
