= Paul Bastock =

English footballer (born 1970)

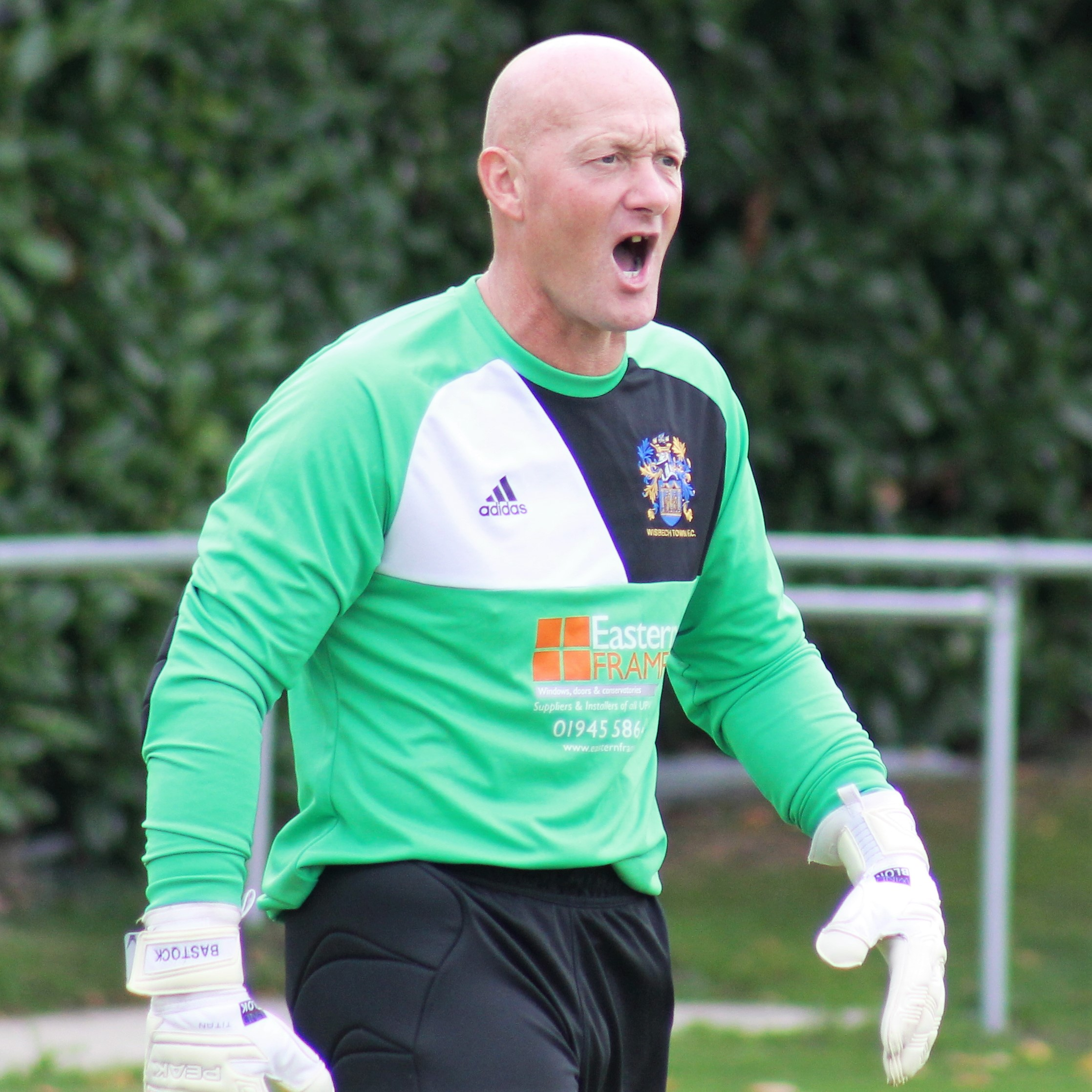
- Bastock with Wisbech Town in 2017

Personal information
- Full name: Paul Anthony Bastock
- Date of birth: 19 May 1970 (age 56)
- Place of birth: Leamington Spa, England
- Height: 5 ft 11 in (1.80 m)
- Position: Goalkeeper

Youth career
- 1986–1988: Coventry City

Senior career*
Years	Team	Apps	(Gls)
1988–1989	Cambridge United	12	(0)
1988	→ Bath City (loan)	1	(0)
1989	Sabah FA		
1989	Cheltenham Town	0	(0)
1989–1990	Fisher Athletic	28	(0)
1990–1992	Kettering Town	29	(0)
1991	→ Aylesbury United (loan)	5	(0)
1992–2004	Boston United	501	(0)
2004	Scarborough	0	(0)
2004	Dagenham & Redbridge	1	(0)
2004–2007	St Albans City	110	(0)
2007–2008	Rushden & Diamonds	19	(0)
2008–2011	St Albans City	121	(0)
2011–2012	Boston United	48	(0)
2012–2013	Worksop Town	41	(0)
2013–2014	St Albans City	43	(0)
2014	Royston Town	11	(0)
2014–2015	St Neots Town	33	(0)
2015–2016	Dunstable Town	25	(0)
2016–2017	Stamford	20	(0)
2017	Corby Town	5	(0)
2017	→ Wisbech Town (dual registration)	1	(0)
2017–2018	Wisbech Town	29	(0)
2018	→ Kettering Town (dual registration)	0	(0)
2018	Grantham Town	1	(0)
2018	Pinchbeck United	1	(0)
2018–2021	King's Lynn Town	0	(0)
2022	Deeping Rangers	1	(0)
2022–2023	Boston United	0	(0)
Total		1,086+	(0)

International career
2001	England C	1	(0)

Managerial career
- 2018–2021: King's Lynn Town (assistant manager)
- 2022: Kettering Town (assistant manager)
- 2022–2024: Boston United (assistant manager)
- 2024–2025: St Albans City (assistant manager)
- 2025–2026: King's Lynn Town (assistant manager)
- * Club domestic league appearances and goals

Paul Anthony Bastock (born 19 May 1970) is an English professional football manager and former professional footballer who played as a goalkeeper. His last job was assistant manager for King's Lynn Town, alongside Ian Culverhouse.

He previously held the record for the most competitive club appearances in world football, having played more than 1,299 times in league and cup competitions, primarily across the English lower leagues, (Note: Paul Bastock is often credited with 1,280 club appearances in the news instead of 1,299 because he is credited with 677 appearances for Boston United instead of 679, most likely the total count is missing his match for Cheltenham Town, his match for Pinchbeck United and his match for Deeping Rangers in 2022, and there are other miscalculations that can't be traced since all sources listing him with a total of 1,280 matches lack the detailed stats per club.) but has since been surpassed by Fábio.

During his career, which began in 1988, Bastock has represented more than twenty clubs, including Cambridge United, Boston United, Rushden & Diamonds and St Albans City. Having played 679 games in all competitions for the club, Bastock was voted as Boston's 'all-time cult hero' by viewers of the BBC show Football Focus in April 2005. He also played once for the England National Game XI (England C) in an unofficial game against a Highland League selection.

He has worked as assistant manager to Ian Culverhouse for King's Lynn Town (twice), Kettering Town, Boston United and St Albans City.

== Club career ==
Bastock started his career in the youth team at Coventry City in the eighties and was a member of their 1987 FA Youth Cup winning side that beat a Southampton youth side including Alan Shearer and Matt Le Tissier. He was released by Coventry and signed his first professional contract in 1988 with Cambridge United where he stayed for one season during which he also played once on loan for Bath City in October 1988, a 1–1 draw against VS Rugby. He then moved to Malaysia to play in the Malaysian Super League where he spent six months with Sabah FA. He then moved back to England, where he spent time on trial with Newcastle United and Leyton Orient, and played a single match for Cheltenham Town in the Gloucestershire Senior Cup in return for a pair of gloves, before signing for Fisher Athletic. After a season with Fisher, he transferred to Kettering Town in 1990 where he spent two years.

At Kettering, after a brief period on loan at Aylesbury United, he impressed and was snapped up by Boston United in 1992. His next 12 years with the Lincolnshire club were to prove the best of his footballing career. His first season with Boston was a disaster, with the club finishing bottom and being relegated from the Football Conference to the Northern Premier League. However, despite conceding 69 goals in 42 games, Bastock was still voted Player of the Season by supporters. He started to concede less goals the season after and Boston had a string of respectable league positions from 1993 to 1998 when they were moved to the Southern Premier League and their fortunes took an upturn. Bastock helped them to a second-place finish in the 1998–99 season and the team won the league and were promoted back to the Conference in 2000. He spent two seasons in the Conference before Boston were promoted to the Football League Third Division, Bastock missing just one game all season as Boston won the Conference. He won the Player of the Season award again in the 2002–03 season, ten years after last winning it. He remained first choice throughout the whole 2003–04 season; the highlight of which was saving a penalty from Yeovil's Gavin Williams to help his side to a 3–2 win. In the summer of 2004, Boston signed Nathan Abbey and Bastock was unable to regain his first-team place. Whilst playing for Boston, he also worked as a care assistant in a nursing home.

He was awarded a testimonial match for his great service to the club before leaving to join Scarborough in October 2004. However, he stayed with Scarborough for just one week, before leaving due to family and travelling issues.

He signed for Dagenham & Redbridge later the same month. He stayed there for two months, making just one appearance, before he was signed by then Conference South side St Albans City in November 2004. He played in 84 consecutive league games for St Albans between his debut match on 23 November 2004 against Hornchurch and 10 November 2006 before he received a suspension after being sent off in an FA Cup tie against Yeading. During the 2005–06 season he was named Supporters Player of the Year, having kept a club record seven consecutive home clean sheets and also equalled the record of six consecutive clean sheets home or away as St Albans win promotion to the Conference.

In 2006, Bastock took a position as part-time goalkeeping coach with Boston United, continuing to play for St Albans until May 2007 when he joined Rushden & Diamonds after St Alban's relegation from the Conference. However, he was released by Rushden in February 2008 and rejoined St Albans City the following month. Within six games of returning was named Conference South Player of the Month He played a crucial role in helping St Albans escape a further relegation and was named as the Supporters Club Player of the Year at the end of the season, only the second player to with the honour twice.

Bastock rejoined former club Boston United, in March 2011. He left the club at the end of the season.

After spending the 2012–13 season at Worksop Town, it was announced he would be rejoining St Albans City for a third time for the 2013–14 season.

After one season with St Albans City, Bastock joined Royston Town in the summer of 2014, linking up with ex-St Albans manager Steve Castle.

Bastock moved up a division to sign for St Neots Town in October 2014 where he would go on to play his 1,000th game in senior football. However, despite being a regular for St Neots Town, Bastock was released by the club along with Matt Spring in 2015.

Bastock then moved to league counterparts Dunstable Town in the summer of 2015.

In January 2016, Bastock moved to Stamford. Injury sidelined him for parts of his time at the Lincolnshire-based club, restricting him to 20 league appearances before he departed in the summer of 2017.

He joined Corby Town prior to the 2017–18 season, making his debut in a 5–1 win at home to Romulus on 12 August. He signed for Wisbech Town on dual registration terms on 21 September 2017. On 2 October 2017 he announced that his stay at Corby Town had ended. In March 2018, he returned to Kettering Town on dual registration.

Bastock announced his retirement from playing at the end of the 2017–18 season at the age of 48 and joined the coaching staff of Grantham Town but was called upon at short notice to come out of retirement for one final league game due to injury, playing in the Northern Premier League fixture away to Basford United on 27 August 2018. He was named as one of the substitutes for a further 11 games that season but was not called upon to play. On 18 October 2018, Bastock signed for Pinchbeck United, and some days later made an appearance with the club on a UCL League Cup game. On 1 November 2018, Bastock joined King's Lynn Town as assistant manager. Eighteen days later, he turned out for the team in their Norfolk Senior Cup tie against the University of East Anglia.

In March 2021, aged 50, Bastock was named as a substitute for an away fixture against Notts County in the National League. He appeared on the bench on subsequent other occasions, with the latest being on 25 May 2021.

Bastock left King's Lynn Town on 10 December 2021.

On 13 August 2022, Bastock returned to playing for a United Counties League Premier Division North match for Deeping Rangers.

On 4 October 2022, Bastock was an unused substitute for Boston United in the FA Cup tie against Basford United.

== International career ==
Bastock also played once for the England National Game XI (England C) in a game against a Highland League selection.

== Managerial career ==
On 1 November 2018, Bastock joined King's Lynn Town as assistant manager, and left the club on 10 December 2021.

On 23 January 2022, Bastock was announced as Kettering Town's new assistant manager, alongside Ian Culverhouse. He left the club, along with Culverhouse, on 15 May 2022.

In September 2022, Bastock returned to Boston United for the role of the assistant manager, once again to Ian Culverhouse. He left Boston on 28 October 2024 after Ian Culverhouse was sacked.

On 28 November 2024, Bastock was appointed as assistant manager at National League South club St Albans City, once again alongside Ian Culverhouse, and they both left on 28 October 2025 in order to re-join King's Lynn Town.

On 29 October 2025, Bastock joined King's Lynn Town as assistant manager to Ian Culverhouse and they departed on 4 March 2026.

== Personal life ==
Bastock's son Callum is also a footballer and a fellow goalkeeper. He played several first-team games at semi-professional level for Boston Town before moving on 22 February 2013 to Grimsby Town on a two-year scholarship deal.

== Career statistics ==
=== Club ===
Appearances and goals by club, season and competition
Club	Season	League		FA Cup		League Cup		Other		Total	
Club	Season	Apps	Goals	Apps	Goals	Apps	Goals	Apps	Goals	Apps	Goals
Coventry City	1986–87										
Cambridge United	1987–88	10	0	0	0	0	0	0	0	10	0
Cambridge United	1988–89	2	0	0	0	1	0	1	0	4	0
Bath City (loan)	1988–89	1	0	0	0	0	0	0	0	1	0
Sabah FA	1989										
Cheltenham Town	1989–90	0	0	0	0	0	0	1	0	1	0
Kettering Town	1989–90	1	0	0	0	0	0	0	0	1	0
Fisher Athletic	1990–91	28	0	0	0	0	0	1	0	29	0
Kettering Town	1990–91	4	0	0	0	0	0	0	0	4	0
Kettering Town	1991–92	24	0	5	0	0	0	1	0	30	0
Aylesbury United (loan)	1991–92	5	0	0	0	0	0	0	0	5	0
Boston United	1992–93	42	0	2	0	0	0	9	0	53	0
Boston United	1993–94	41	0	3	0	0	0	7	0	51	0
Boston United	1994–95	41	0	3	0	1	0	7	0	52	0
Boston United	1995–96	41	0	1	0	0	0	16	0	58	0
Boston United	1996–97	39	0	6	0	0	0	12	0	57	0
Boston United	1997–98	41	0	2	0	0	0	9	0	52	0
Boston United	1998–99	39	0	1	0	0	0	17	0	57	0
Boston United	1999–2000	42	0	4	0	0	0	4	0	50	0
Boston United	2000–01	42	0	2	0	0	0	4	0	48	0
Boston United	2001–02	41	0	1	0	0	0	2	0	44	0
Boston United	2002–03	46	0	1	0	2	0	2	0	51	0
Boston United	2003–04	46	0	1	0	1	0	3	0	51	0
Scarborough	2004–05	0	0	0	0	0	0	0	0	0	0
Dagenham & Redbridge	2004–05	1	0	0	0	0	0	0	0	1	0
St Albans City	2004–05	24	0	0	0	0	0	5	0	29	0
St Albans City	2005–06	42	0	4	0	0	0	4	0	50	0
St Albans City	2006–07	44	0	0	0	0	0	2	0	46	0
Rushden & Diamonds	2007–08	19	0	1	0	1	0	4	0	25	0
St Albans City	2007–08	11	0	0	0	0	0	0	0	11	0
St Albans City	2008–09	36	0	2	0	0	0	5	0	43	0
St Albans City	2009–10	40	0	0	0	0	0	1	0	41	0
St Albans City	2010–11	34	0	3	0	0	0	3	0	40	0
Boston United	2010–11	9	0	0	0	0	0	0	0	9	0
Boston United	2011–12	39	0	0	0	0	0	6	0	45	0
Worksop Town	2012–13	41	0	0	0	0	0	1	0	42	0
St Albans City	2013–14	43	0	4	0	0	0	8	0	55	0
Royston Town	2014–15	11	0	0	0	0	0	2	0	13	0
St Neots Town	2014–15	33	0	0	0	0	0	6	0	39	0
Dunstable Town	2015–16	25	0	0	0	0	0	5	0	30	0
Stamford	2015–16	18	0	0	0	0	0	1	0	19	0
Stamford	2016–17	2	0	3	0	0	0	1	0	6	0
Corby Town	2017–18	5	0	0	0	0	0	0	0	5	0
Wisbech Town	2017–18							1+	0	33	0
Kettering Town	2017–18 (Note: Paul Bastock played in at least 38 matches for Kettering Town.)										
Grantham Town	2018–19	1	0	0	0	0	0	0	0	1	0
Pinchbeck United	2018–19	1	0	0	0	0	0	0	0	1	0
King's Lynn Town	2018–19	0	0	0	0	0	0	1	0	1	0
King's Lynn Town	2020–21	0	0	0	0	0	0	0	0	0	0
King's Lynn Town	2021–22	0	0	0	0	0	0	0	0	0	0
Deeping Rangers	2022–23	1	0	0	0	0	0	0	0	1	0
Boston United	2022–23	0	0	0	0	0	0	0	0	0	0
Career total		1,056+ (Note: The symbol "+" indicates possibly more, since the source for the stats with Wisbech Town only includes a total and the numbers with that club are not known by competition.)	0	49+	0	6+	0	152+	0	1,299+ (Note: "+" because the number of his appearances for Sabah FA is unknown. Also, the total has one more to the one it sums, as, while the total sum of his appearances for Boston United on the table is 678, based on the detailed statistics, he actually played in a total of 679.)	0

== Honours ==
Coventry City

- FA Youth Cup Winners: 1986–87

Boston United

- Southern Football League Premier Division Champions: 1999–2000
- Football Conference Champions: 2001–02

St Albans City

- Conference South Play-off Winners: 2005–06

== See also ==
- List of men's footballers with the most official appearances
