= Interliga 2008 group stage =

Association football tournament

== Group A ==
Team	Pld	W	D	L	GF	GA	GD	Pts
(Mexico) América	3	3	0	0	6	3	+3	9
(Mexico) Atlas	3	1	1	1	4	3	+1	4
(Mexico) Toluca	3	1	1	1	4	3	+1	4
(Mexico) Morelia	3	0	0	3	1	6	-5	0

All times EST

2008-01-03
20:00

Toluca (Mexico)	0 – 0	(Mexico) Atlas
	(Report)

Robertson Stadium, Houston, Texas
Attendance: 9,354
Referee: Terry W. Vaughn (United States)

2008-01-03
22:30

Morelia (Mexico)	0 – 1	(Mexico) América
	(Report)	Argüello 13'

Robertson Stadium, Houston, Texas
Attendance: 9,354
Referee: Arkadiusz Prus (United States)

2008-01-06
17:00

América (Mexico)	2 – 1	(Mexico) Toluca
Argüello 64'; Núñez 73'	(Report)	Sánchez 14'

Pizza Hut Park, Frisco, Texas
Attendance: 18,970
Referee: Kevin Stott (United States)

2008-01-06
19:30

Atlas (Mexico)	2 – 0	(Mexico) Morelia
Marioni 14' 67'	(Report)

Pizza Hut Park, Frisco, Texas
Attendance: 18,970
Referee: Mark Geiger (United States)

2008-01-09
21:00

Toluca (Mexico)	3 – 1	(Mexico) Morelia
Giménez 44'; Zinha 71'; Sánchez 90'	(Report)	Guzmán 38'

Home Depot Center, Carson, California
Attendance: 20,167
Referee: Tim Weyland (United States)

2008-01-09
23:15

Atlas (Mexico)	2 – 3	(Mexico) América
Marioni 53' 75' (pen.)	(Report)	Rodríguez 59'; Cabañas 69'; Argüello 88'

Home Depot Center, Carson, California
Attendance: 20,167
Referee: Brian Hall (United States)

== Group B ==
Team	Pld	W	D	L	GF	GA	GD	Pts
(Mexico) San Luis	3	2	0	1	3	1	+2	6
(Mexico) Cruz Azul	3	2	0	1	2	1	+1	6
(Mexico) Monterrey	3	1	0	2	1	2	-1	3
(Mexico) UNAM	3	1	0	2	1	3	-2	3

All times EST

2008-01-02
20:00

Monterrey (Mexico)	0 – 1	(Mexico) UNAM
	(Report)	Bonells 69'

Pizza Hut Park, Frisco, Texas
Attendance: 8,504
Referee: Ricardo Salazar (United States)

2008-01-02
22:30

Cruz Azul (Mexico)	0 – 1	(Mexico) San Luis
	(Report)	A. Moreno 17' (pen.)

Pizza Hut Park, Frisco, Texas
Attendance: 8.504
Referee: Baldomero Toledo (United States)

2008-01-05
20:00

Cruz Azul (Mexico)	1 – 0	(Mexico) Monterrey
Andrade 16'	(Report)

Robertson Stadium, Houston, Texas
Attendance: 12,910
Referee: Jorge Gonzalez (United States)

2008-01-05
22:30

San Luis (Mexico)	2 – 0	(Mexico) UNAM
T. Moreno 8'; A. Moreno 36'	(Report)

Robertson Stadium, Houston, Texas
Attendance: 12,910
Referee: Jair Marrufo (United States)

2008-01-08
21:00

Monterrey (Mexico)	1 – 0	(Mexico) San Luis
Suazo 12'	(Report)

Home Depot Center, Carson, California
Attendance: 9,865
Referee: Abiodun Okulaja (United States)

2008-01-08
23:15

UNAM (Mexico)	0 – 1	(Mexico) Cruz Azul
	(Report)	Vigneri 14'

Home Depot Center, Carson, California
Attendance: 9,865
Referee: Michael Kennedy (United States)
