= InterLiga 2004 group stage =

== Group A ==
Team	Pld	W	D	L	GF	GA	GD	Pts
Santos Laguna	3	2	0	1	6	5	1	6
Morelia	3	2	0	1	5	6	1	6
Toluca	3	2	0	1	4	3	1	6
Guadalajara	3	0	0	3	3	6	-3	0

All times EST

2004-01-04
17:30

Toluca (Mexico)	1 – 0	(Mexico) Morelia
Abundis 67'

Stagg Memorial Stadium, Stockton, California
Referee: Ricardo Valenzuela (United States)

2004-01-04
20:00

Guadalajara (Mexico)	1 – 2	(Mexico) Santos Laguna
Bravo 1'		Borgetti 3' 54'

Home Depot Center, Carson, California
Attendance: 27,000
Referee: Stewart Scott (United States)

2004-01-09
20:00

Morelia (Mexico)	3 – 2	(Mexico) Santos Laguna
Pavón 26', 50'; Álvarez 69'		Vuoso 39'; Borgetti 60' (pen.)

Reliant Stadium, Houston, Texas

2004-01-09
22:30

Guadalajara (Mexico)	1 – 2	(Mexico) Toluca
Bautista 84'		Lozano 20'; Zepeda 33'

Reliant Stadium, Houston, Texas
Referee: Michael Kennedy (United States)

2004-01-11
18:30

Guadalajara (Mexico)	1 – 2	(Mexico) Morelia
Bravo 15'		Álvarez 29'; Pavón 39'

Cotton Bowl, Dallas, Texas
Referee: Alex Prus (United States)

2004-01-11
21:30

Toluca (Mexico)	1 – 2	(Mexico) Santos Laguna
Zepeda 6'		Rodríguez 57'; Ruiz 63'

Cotton Bowl, Dallas, Texas
Referee: Kevin Terry (United States)

== Group B ==
Team	Pld	W	D	L	GF	GA	GD	Pts
Atlas	3	2	1	0	8	3	5	7
América	3	1	2	0	6	5	1	5
UANL	3	1	1	1	4	5	-1	4
Atlante	3	0	0	3	5	10	-5	0

All times EST

2004-01-04
15:00

UANL (Mexico)	0 – 2	(Mexico) Atlas
		Durán 39'; Pérez 78'

Stagg Memorial Stadium, Stockton, California
Referee: Ali Saheli (United States)

2004-01-04
22:30

América (Mexico)	3 – 2	(Mexico) Atlante
Navia 37' 52'; González 81'		Padilla 21'; González 69'

Home Depot Center, Carson, California
Attendance: 27,000
Referee: Michael Kennedy (United States)

2004-01-06
22:00

América (Mexico)	2 – 2	(Mexico) Atlas
Blanco 76' 85'		Morales 1' 65'

Spartan Stadium, San Jose, California
Referee: Ricardo Valenzuela (United States)

2004-01-07
00:30

Atlante (Mexico)	2 – 3	(Mexico) UANL
Martel 11'; S. González 81'		J. González 29', o.g.' de Nigris 49'; Mendoza 54'

Spartan Stadium, San Jose, California
Referee: Alex Cruz (United States)

2004-01-11
14:00

Atlante (Mexico)	1 – 4	(Mexico) Atlas
Pacheco 35'		Pérez 10' 38' 53'; Herrera 32'

Reliant Stadium, Houston, Texas
Referee: Terry Vaughn (United States)

2004-01-11
16:30

América (Mexico)	1 – 1	(Mexico) UANL
Oviedo 11'		Palacios 27'

Reliant Stadium, Houston, Texas
Referee: Michael Kennedy (United States)
